= Minister of Defence (Vietnam) =

Position in the government of Vietnam

Minister of National Defence
- Vietnamese: Bộ trưởng Bộ Quốc phòng
- Emblem of Vietnam with the MOD's banner

- Incumbent; Phan Văn Giang since 8 April 2021
- Ministry of Defence
- Style: His Excellency
- Member of: Cabinet
- Reports to: President; Prime minister
- Appointer: President; with CPV Politburo introduction, advice and consent
- Term length: No fixed term
- Formation: 8 May 1945
- First holder: Chu Văn Tấn
- Deputy: Vice Minister of Defence
- Website: www.mod.gov.vn

The minister of national defence (Vietnamese: Bộ trưởng Bộ Quốc phòng, lit. 'minister of the Ministry of National Defence') is a Vietnamese cabinet member in charge of the Ministry of National Defence. The minister is responsible for the formal executive management functions of state for defence. By Vietnamese politics' design, the assigned defence minister also automatically assumes the positions of deputy secretary of the Central Military Commission (CMC), member of the Politburo and member of the Council for National Defense and Security, by that the defence minister is practically the highest-ranking military officer - who always keeps the rank of army general - and politically the second-highest leader of the Vietnam People’s Army as well as the Militia and Self-Defence Force, just under the general secretary of the Communist Party of Vietnam - who serves ex officio as the secretary of the Central Military Commission. The current defence minister is Army General Phan Văn Giang, since 8 April 2021.

== Chain of command ==
- General Secretary of the Communist Party (ex officio Secretary of the CMC)
- President (nominal commander-in-chief of the People's Armed Forces)
- Prime Minister
- Minister of Defence (ex officio Deputy Secretary of the CMC)
- Chief of the General Political Department
- Chief of the General Staff (ex officio Deputy Defence Minister)
- Deputy ministers of defence

== Lists of ministers of defence ==
No. (Note: These numbers are not official.)	Portrait	Name (Birth–Death)	Term of office			Rank (Note: The Central Committee when it convenes for its first session after being elected by a National Party Congress elects the Politburo. The Politburo members are ranked in an official order of precedence every time the body is elected by the Central Committee.)	Cabinet(s)	Ref.
No.	Portrait	Name (Birth–Death)	Took office	Left office	Time in office	Rank	Cabinet(s)	Ref.
Minister of Defence of the Democratic Republic of Vietnam (1945 – 76)
1		Chu Văn Tấn (1909–1984)	28 August 1945	2 March 1946	186 days	—	Provisional Revolutionary	
1		Chu Văn Tấn (1909–1984)	28 August 1945	2 March 1946	186 days	—	Provisional Unitary	
2		Phan Anh (1912–1989)	2 March 1946	3 November 1946	246 days	—	National Unitary	
3		Võ Nguyên Giáp (1911–2013)	3 November 1946	1 August 1947	271 days	—	Minh	
4		Tạ Quang Bửu (1910–1986)	1 August 1947	1 July 1948	335 days	—	Minh	
3		Võ Nguyên Giáp (1911–2013)	1 July 1948	2 July 1976	28 years, 1 day	5	Minh	
3		Võ Nguyên Giáp (1911–2013)	1 July 1948	2 July 1976	28 years, 1 day	5	Đồng I	
3		Võ Nguyên Giáp (1911–2013)	1 July 1948	2 July 1976	28 years, 1 day	7	Đồng II	
3		Võ Nguyên Giáp (1911–2013)	1 July 1948	2 July 1976	28 years, 1 day	7	Đồng III	
3		Võ Nguyên Giáp (1911–2013)	1 July 1948	2 July 1976	28 years, 1 day	7	Đồng IV	
3		Võ Nguyên Giáp (1911–2013)	1 July 1948	2 July 1976	28 years, 1 day	7	Đồng V	
Minister of Defence of the Republic of South Vietnam (1969 – 76)
—		Trần Nam Trung (1912–2009)	8 June 1969	2 July 1976	7 years, 24 days	—	Provisional Revolutionary	
Minister of Defence of the Socialist Republic of Vietnam (1976 – present)
1		Võ Nguyên Giáp (1911–2013)	2 July 1976	7 February 1980	3 years, 220 days	4	Đồng VI	
2		Văn Tiến Dũng (1917–2002)	7 February 1980	16 February 1987	7 years, 9 days	—	Đồng VI	
2		Văn Tiến Dũng (1917–2002)	7 February 1980	16 February 1987	7 years, 9 days	6	Đồng VI	
2		Văn Tiến Dũng (1917–2002)	7 February 1980	16 February 1987	7 years, 9 days	—	Đồng VII	
3		Lê Đức Anh (1920–2019)	16 February 1987	8 August 1992	5 years, 174 days	6	Đồng VII	
3		Lê Đức Anh (1920–2019)	16 February 1987	8 August 1992	5 years, 174 days	6	Hùng	
3		Lê Đức Anh (1920–2019)	16 February 1987	8 August 1992	5 years, 174 days	6	Mười	
4		Đoàn Khuê (1922–1999)	8 August 1992	29 December 1997	5 years, 143 days	5	Mười	
4		Đoàn Khuê (1922–1999)	8 August 1992	29 December 1997	5 years, 143 days	5	Kiệt I	
4		Đoàn Khuê (1922–1999)	8 August 1992	29 December 1997	5 years, 143 days	6	Kiệt II	
5		Phạm Văn Trà (born 1935)	29 December 1997	28 June 2006	8 years, 181 days	5	Khải I	
5		Phạm Văn Trà (born 1935)	29 December 1997	28 June 2006	8 years, 181 days	11	Khải II	
6		Phùng Quang Thanh (1949–2021)	28 June 2006	8 April 2016	9 years, 285 days	8	Dũng I	
6		Phùng Quang Thanh (1949–2021)	28 June 2006	8 April 2016	9 years, 285 days	8	Dũng II	
6		Phùng Quang Thanh (1949–2021)	28 June 2006	8 April 2016	9 years, 285 days	2	Dũng III	
7		Ngô Xuân Lịch (born 1954)	9 April 2016	7 April 2021	4 years, 363 days	—	Phúc	
7		Ngô Xuân Lịch (born 1954)	9 April 2016	7 April 2021	4 years, 363 days	6	Phúc	
8		Phan Văn Giang (born 1960)	8 April 2021	Incumbent	5 years, 227 days	—	Chính	
8		Phan Văn Giang (born 1960)	8 April 2021	Incumbent	5 years, 227 days	12	Chính	
8		Phan Văn Giang (born 1960)	8 April 2021	Incumbent	5 years, 227 days	7	Hưng	

== See also ==
- Minister of National Defense (South Vietnam)
- Prime Minister of Vietnam
- Deputy Prime Minister of Vietnam

== Bibliography ==
- Van, Canh Nguyen; Cooper, Earle (1983). Vietnam under Communism, 1975–1982. Hoover Press. ISBN 9780817978518.
