= Secretary of the Central Military Commission of the Communist Party of Vietnam =

Senior Vietnamese military official

Secretary of the Central Military Commission
- Bí thư Quân ủy Trung ương
- Emblem of the Communist Party of Vietnam

- Flag of the Communist Party of Vietnam

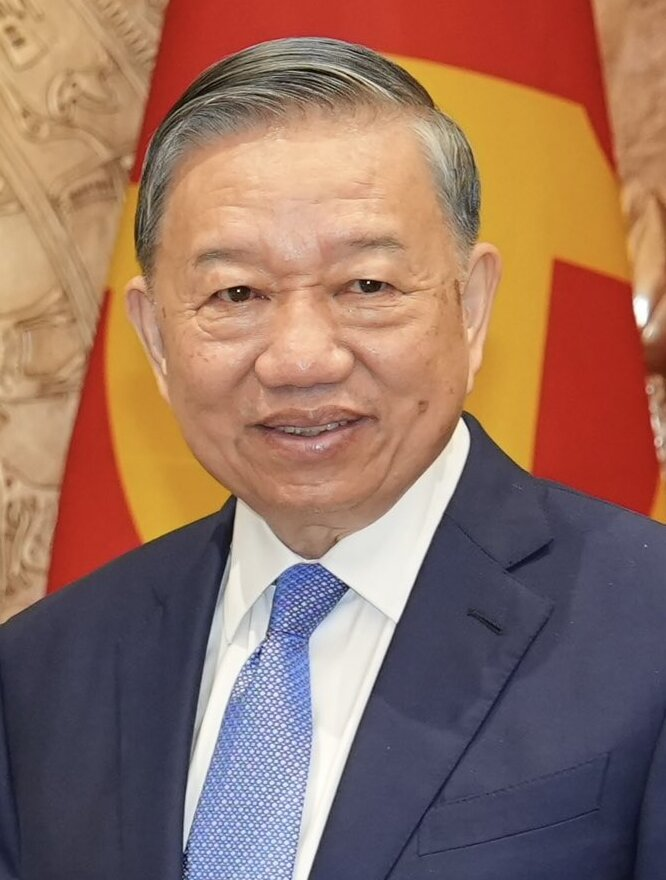
- Incumbent; Tô Lâm since 3 August 2024
- Central Military Commission
- Term length: Five years
- Inaugural holder: Võ Nguyên Giáp
- Formation: 1946; 80 years ago
- Deputy: Deputy Secretary

The secretary of the Central Military Commission of the Communist Party of Vietnam is the head of the Central Military Commission of the Communist Party of Vietnam and politically the highest leader of the People's Army of Vietnam, making the officeholder the de facto commander-in-chief of the Armed Forces. According to the Charter of the Communist Party of Vietnam, this position is concurrently held by the general secretary of the Communist Party of Vietnam, demonstrating the consistent role of the Communist Party of Vietnam in providing absolute and direct leadership to the People's Army of Vietnam. There have been times when the two offices have been held by different people (i.e Võ Nguyên Giáp, Văn Tiến Dũng and Lê Duẩn).

== Officeholders ==
=== Secretary of the Central Military Commission (1946–48) ===
No.^{[note 1]}	Portrait	Name (birth–death)	Took office	Left office	Rank^{[note 2]}	Central Committee
1		Võ Nguyên Giáp (1911–2013)	1946	October 1948	3	1st Central Committee (1935–51)

=== Secretary of the General Military Commission (1952–61) ===
No.^{[note 1]}	Portrait	Name (birth–death)	Took office	Left office	Rank^{[note 2]}	Central Committee
1		Võ Nguyên Giáp (1911–2013)	May 1952	January 1961	5	2nd Central Committee (1951–60)
1		Võ Nguyên Giáp (1911–2013)	May 1952	January 1961	7	3rd Central Committee (1960–76)

=== Secretary of the Central Military Commission (1961–84) ===
No.^{[note 1]}	Portrait	Name (birth–death)	Took office	Left office	Rank^{[note 2]}	Central Committee
1		Võ Nguyên Giáp (1911–2013)	January 1961	1977	7	3rd Central Committee (1960–76)
1		Võ Nguyên Giáp (1911–2013)	January 1961	1977	6	4th Central Committee (1976–82)
2		Lê Duẩn (1907–1986)	1977	December 1984	1	4th Central Committee (1976–82)
2		Lê Duẩn (1907–1986)	1977	December 1984	1	5th Central Committee (1982–86)

=== Central Military–Party Committee (1985–97) ===
No.^{[note 1]}	Portrait	Name (birth–death)	Took office	Left office	Rank^{[note 2]}	Central Committee
3	A young man, cropped from a group shot	Văn Tiến Dũng (1917–2002)	4 July 1985	14 July 1986	10	5th Central Committee (1982–86)
3	A young man, cropped from a group shot	Văn Tiến Dũng (1917–2002)	4 July 1985	14 July 1986	6	5th Central Committee (1982–86)
4	A middle-aged man wearing a V-necked white collarless shirt	Trường Chinh (1907–1988)	14 July 1986	18 December 1986	1	5th Central Committee (1982–86)
5		Nguyễn Văn Linh (1915–1998)	18 December 1986	27 June 1991	1	6th Central Committee (1986–91)
6		Đỗ Mười (1917–2018)	27 June 1991	26 December 1997	1	7th Central Committee (1991–96)

=== Central Military Commission (1997–present) ===
No.^{[note 1]}	Portrait	Name (birth–death)	Took office	Left office	Rank^{[note 2]}	Central Committee
7		Lê Khả Phiêu (1932–2020)	26 December 1997	22 April 2001	1	8th Central Committee (1996–2001)
8	a man with greying black hair, wearing a suit and tie	Nông Đức Mạnh (1939–)	22 April 2001	19 January 2011	1	9th Central Committee (2001–06)
8	a man with greying black hair, wearing a suit and tie	Nông Đức Mạnh (1939–)	22 April 2001	19 January 2011	1	10th Central Committee (2006–11)
9		Nguyễn Phú Trọng (1944–2024)	19 January 2011	19 July 2024	1	11th Central Committee (2011–16)
9		Nguyễn Phú Trọng (1944–2024)	19 January 2011	19 July 2024	1	12th Central Committee (2016–21)
9		Nguyễn Phú Trọng (1944–2024)	19 January 2011	19 July 2024	1	13th Central Committee (2021–26)
10		Tô Lâm (1956–)	3 August 2024	Incumbent	1	13th Central Committee (2021–26)
10		Tô Lâm (1956–)	3 August 2024	Incumbent	1	14th Central Committee (2026–31)

== Notes ==
1. These numbers are not official.
2. The Central Committee when it convenes for its first session after being elected by a National Party Congress elects the Politburo. According to David Koh, in interviews with several high-standing Vietnamese officials, the Politburo ranking is based upon the number of approval votes by the Central Committee. Lê Hồng Anh, the Minister of Public Security, was ranked 2nd in the 10th Politburo because he received the second-highest number of approval votes. Another example being Tô Huy Rứa of the 10th Politburo, he was ranked lowest because he received the lowest approval vote of the 10th Central Committee when he stood for election for a seat in the Politburo. This system was implemented at the 1st plenum of the 10th Central Committee. The Politburo ranking functioned as an official order of precedence before the 10th Party Congress, and some believe it still does.

== Bibliography ==
- Koh, David (July–August 2008). "Leadership Changes at the 10th Congress of the Vietnamese Communist Party". Asian Survey. 48 (4). University of California Press: 650–672. doi:10.1525/as.2008.48.4.650. JSTOR 10.1525/as.2008.48.4.650.
- Van, Canh Nguyen; Cooper, Earle (1983). Vietnam under Communism, 1975–1982. Hoover Press. ISBN 9780817978518.
