= Tố Hữu =

Vietnamese revolutionary poet and politician

First Deputy Chairman of the Council of Ministers Deputy Prime Minister of Vietnam
- In office 7 February 1980 – 21 June 1986 5 years, 154 days
- Prime Minister: Phạm Văn Đồng
- Preceded by: First deputy chairman
- Succeeded by: Võ Chí Công
- Constituency: Vietnam

Member of the 4th and 5th Politburo
- In office 20 December 1976 – 21 June 1986 5 years, 150 days

Alternate Member of the 4th Politburo of the Communist Party of Vietnam
- In office 1976–1980

Head of the Central Propaganda Department of the Communist Party of Vietnam
- In office 1968–1982
- Preceded by: Trường Chinh
- Succeeded by: Bùi Thanh Khiết

Director of the Government's Committee for Culture and Education
- In office 1960 – January 1963
- Preceded by: First
- Succeeded by: Lê Liêm

Secretary of the Secretariat (2nd to 4th terms)
- In office 1958–1980

Personal details
- Born: Nguyễn Kim Thành; 4 October 1920 Quảng Điền, Thừa Thiên Huế, Central Vietnam, French Indochina
- Died: 9 December 2002 (aged 82) Hanoi, Vietnam
- Party: Communist Party of Vietnam
- Spouse: Vũ Thị Thanh
- Education: Quốc Học Huế High School
- Occupation: poet, politician

Tố Hữu
- Education: Quốc Học – Huế High School for the Gifted
- Occupations: Poet, politician
- Spouse: Vũ Thị Thanh
- Children: (3)Nguyễn Thanh Hoa (eldest daughter)Nguyễn Vũ Phương (son)Nguyễn Minh Hồng (youngest daughter)
- Writing career
- Language: Vietnamese
- Period: 1936–2002
- Genre: Revolutionary poetry
- Subject: Revolution
- Notable works: Từ ấy, Việt Bắc
- Notable awards: Ho Chi Minh Prize Gold Star Order
- Movement: New Poetry Movement

Tố Hữu (4 October 1920 – 9 December 2002) was a Vietnamese revolutionary poet and politician. Tố Hữu is considered one of the most important Vietnamese poets of the 20th century. His poems are known for their lyrical beauty, their political engagement, and their insights into the Vietnamese people. Tố Hữu's poetry is a valuable record of the Vietnamese revolution and the Vietnamese people's struggle for independence. His poems are also a testament to the power of poetry to inspire and to give voice to the oppressed. He published seven collections of poems, the first of which was the 1946 collection entitled Từ ấy (Thenceforth), which included many of his most popular and influential works that were written between 1937 and 1946. Following the establishment of the Democratic Republic of Vietnam, he became a prominent figure in the ruling Communist Party of Vietnam.

== Biography ==
Tố Hữu, whose real name is Nguyễn Kim Thành, was born 4 October 1920 in Hội An, Quảng Nam province, as the youngest son of the family. At the age of 9, Thành and his father returned home and lived in Phu Lai village, now in Quảng Thọ commune, Quảng Điền district, Huế. Thành's father was a poor scholar, could not earn a living and struggled to earn a living, but he liked poetry, liked collecting proverbs and folk songs. He taught Thành to write old poems. Thành's mother was also the daughter of a scholar, knew many folk songs of Hue and loved him very much. His parents helped to nourish the soul of Thành's poetry. Thành's mother died when he was 12 years old. At the age of 13, Thành entered Hue National University, where he was directly exposed to the ideas of Karl Marx, Friedrich Engels, Vladimir Lenin, and Maxim Gorky. Thành approached these ideas through books, combined with the mobilisation of members of the Communist Party of Vietnam (Lê Duẩn, Phan Đăng Lưu, Nguyen Chi Dieu) soon communist ideals. In 1936, Thành joined the Indochina Democratic Youth Union, and then in 1938, he was admitted to the Indochina Communist Party.

In 1938 Thành met a teacher, who gave him the pseudonym "Tố Hữu" 素有, taken from a remark by Lady Du that her son – Zhao Kuangyin, the future Emperor Taizu of Song – "always had great aspirations" (吾兒素有大志); Thành accepted this pseudonym and interpreted it as "pure friend", written with the homophonous characters 素友. In April 1939, Tố Hữu was arrested, tortured and exiled to Thua Phu Prison (Hue) and transferred to Lao Bảo Prison (Quang Tri) and many other prisons in the Central Highlands. In March 1942, he escaped from the prison Đắc Glêi (now in Kon Tum), went to Thanh Hóa and contacted the party (through his secret activities in the Hậu Lộc district, Thanh Hóa province). In 1945, when the August Revolution broke out, he was elected Chairman of the Rebellion Committee of Thua Thien-Hue.

Tố Hữu moved quickly and successfully through what became the Communist Party of Vietnam. During the pre-unification period (before 1975) Tố Hữu was most influential in setting cultural policy in North Vietnam, especially in deciding the bounds of what was permissible for intellectuals and artists to publish and perform during this tightly controlled period. His control of intellectual and artistic production was matched only by Trường Chinh and Hồ Chí Minh himself. Intellectual discontent with this control was expressed by the poet Lê Đạt who, during the Nhân Văn affair, declared that Tố Hữu considered writers and artists petty bourgeois elements, and regarded literature as a mere tool of politics. As an example, he mentioned the case of Nam Cao whom Tố Hữu compelled to write a work on the rural taxation system, a topic with which the writer was by no means familiar.

He continued to hold many important party and government posts, including member of the Politburo, Secretary of the Central Committee, Deputy chairman of the Council of Ministers (as the government cabinet was then called), and the same post that was later renamed Deputy Prime Minister.

As the leader of the cultural section, he was named as the chief instigator of the persecution of intellectuals during the Nhân Văn affair. However, according to the musician Văn Cao, one of the prominent victims, the main author of this policy was Trường Chinh, the general secretary of the communist party at that time. According to Văn Cao, Tố Hữu, as a poet, was not sufficiently hard-hearted to pursue such a policy on his own. (See the article at the Vietnamese Wikipedia).

During his career Tố Hữu was awarded the Gold Star Order, the 60-year membership badge, and the Hồ Chí Minh Award, the highest award for literary and artistic accomplishments conferred by the Vietnamese state.

Tố Hữu enjoyed a steep rise in the party and government culminating in an equally steep and precipitous decline. He was blamed for the disastrous 1985 attempt at monetary reform and the ruinous inflation that resulted from its unsuccessful implementation. Inflation had risen 700% by 1986. Tố Hữu had to step down from his position as deputy prime minister and played no further political role in Vietnam. Despite his political fall from grace, Tố Hữu remained the Communist Party's poet laureate. He died in 2002, at the age of 80.

== List of main works ==
- Từ ấy (Henceforth) (1946), 72 poems
- Việt Bắc (Viet Bac) (1954), 26 poems
- Gió lộng (Windy) (1961), 25 poems
- Ra trận (Head to war) (1962–1971), 35 poems
- Máu và Hoa (Blood and Flowers) (1977), 13 poems
- Một tiếng đờn (A sound of music) (1992), 74 poems
- Ta với ta (Me with myself) (1999)

== List of popular poems ==
- Bác ơi (Uncle)
- Bà má Hậu Giang (Mother Hau Giang)
- Bài ca xuân 1961 (The song of Spring 1961)
- Bài ca quê hương (Homeland song)
- Bầm ơi (Mommy)
- Con cá chột nưa (Fish and vegetables)
- Có thể nào yên? (Could it be okay?)
- Đi đi em! (Go, brother!)
- Em ơi... Ba Lan (My dear... Poland)
- Emily, con (Emily, my daughter)
- Gặp anh Hồ Giáo (Meeting Ho Giao)
- Hai đứa trẻ (Two children)
- Hồ Chí Minh (Ho Chi Minh)
- Hãy nhớ lấy lời tôi (Remember my words)
- Hoa tím (Purple flowers)
- Hoan hô chiến sĩ Điện Biên (Hurrah, Dien Bien soldiers)
- Kính gửi cụ Nguyễn Du (To Nguyen Du)
- Khi con tu hú (When the gowk calls)
- Lao Bảo (Lao Bao)
- Lạ chưa (Strange)
- Lượm (Luom)
- Mẹ Suốt (Mother Suot)
- Mẹ Tơm (Mother Tom)
- Mồ côi (Orphan)
- Một tiếng đờn (A sound of music)
- Miền Nam (South)
- Mưa rơi (Rain falling)
- Năm xưa (The bygone years)
- Nước non-ngàn dặm (Thousands of miles across the country)
- Sáng tháng Năm (May's morning)
- Ta đi tới (Let's go)
- Ta với ta (Me with myself)
- Tạm biệt (Goodbye)
- Từ ấy (Henceforth)
- Tâm tư trong tù (Confidant in prison)
- Tương tri (Understand each other)
- Theo chân Bác (Follow the Uncle's footsteps)
- Tiếng chổi tre (The sound of bamboo brooms)
- Tiếng hát sông Hương (Singing on the Perfume River)
- Tiếng ru (Lullaby)
- Với Lênin (With Lenin)
- Vườn nhà (Home garden)
- Việt Bắc (Viet Bac)
- Việt Nam máu và hoa (Vietnam, blood and flowers)
- Xuân đang ở đâu... (Where is spring)
- Xuân đấy (That spring)

== See also ==
- History of Vietnam
