= 5th Politburo of the Communist Party of Vietnam =

Politburo of Vietnam's Communist Party

The 5th Politburo of the Communist Party of Vietnam (CPV), formally the 5th Political Bureau of the Central Committee of the Communist Party of Vietnam (Vietnamese: Bộ Chính trị Ban Chấp hành trung ương Đảng Cộng sản Việt Nam Khoá V), was elected at the 1st Plenary Session of the 5th Central Committee in the immediate aftermath of the 5th National Congress.

== Composition ==
=== Members ===
Members of the 5th Politburo of the Communist Party of Vietnam
Rank	Name	4th POL		6th POL		Birth	PM	Birthplace	Education	Ethnicity	Gender	Ref.
Rank	Name	New	Rank	New	Rank	Birth	PM	Birthplace	Education	Ethnicity	Gender	Ref.
1	Lê Duẩn	Old	1	Died	—	1907	1930	Quảng Trị Province	—	Kinh	Male	
2	Trường Chinh	Old	2	Not	—	1907	1930	Nam Định province	—	Kinh	Male	
3	Phạm Văn Đồng	Old	3	Not	—	1906	1930	Quảng Ngãi province	—	Kinh	Male	
4	Phạm Hùng	Old	4	Reelected	2	1912	1930	Vĩnh Long province	—	Kinh	Male	
5	Lê Đức Thọ	Old	5	Not	—	1911	1930	Nam Định province	—	Kinh	Male	
6	Văn Tiến Dũng	Old	10	Not	—	1917	1937	Hà Nội City	—	Kinh	Male	
7	Võ Chí Công	Old	13	Reelected	3	1912	1935	Đà Nẵng City	—	Kinh	Male	
8	Chu Huy Mân	Old	14	Not	—	1913	1930	Nghệ An province	Military science	Kinh	Male	
9	Tố Hữu	Old	15	Not	—	1920	1938	Thừa Thiên province	—	Kinh	Male	
10	Võ Văn Kiệt	Alternate	16	Reelected	5	1922	1939	Vĩnh Long province	—	Kinh	Male	
11	Đỗ Mười	Alternate	17	Reelected	4	1917	1939	Hà Nội City	—	Kinh	Male	
12	Lê Đức Anh	New	—	Reelected	6	1920	1938	Thừa Thiên Huế province	—	Kinh	Male	
13	Nguyễn Đức Tâm	New	—	Reelected	7	1920	1944	Thái Bình province	—	Kinh	Male	
14	Nguyễn Văn Linh	By-election	—	Reelected	1	1915	1936	Hưng Yên province	—	Kinh	Male	

=== Alternates ===
Alternates of the 5th Politburo of the Communist Party of Vietnam
Rank	Name	4th POL		6th POL		Birth	PM	Birthplace	Education	Ethnicity	Gender	Ref.
Rank	Name	New	Rank	New	Rank	Birth	PM	Birthplace	Education	Ethnicity	Gender	Ref.
15	Nguyễn Cơ Thạch	New	—	Member	8	1921	1943	Nam Định province	—	Kinh	Male	
16	Đồng Sĩ Nguyên	New	—	Member	9	1923	1938	Quảng Bình province	Military science	Kinh	Male	

== Bibliography ==
- Chân dung 19 ủy viên Bộ Chính trị khóa XII
