= 2020–25 term of the Central Military Commission of the Communist Party of Vietnam =

Politburo of Vietnam's Communist Party

The 2020–25 term of the Central Military Commission (CMC) of the Communist Party of Vietnam (CPV) was appointed by a decision of the 13th Politburo. Nguyễn Phú Trọng was re-appointed for a third term as CMC Secretary, a position he has held since 2011.

Colonel General Trần Quang Phương voluntarily left office on his election as Vice Chairman of the National Assembly of Vietnam in July 2021, and Lieutenant General Trần Hồng Minh left office on his appointment as Secretary of the Cao Bằng Provincial Party Committee in September. Nguyễn Xuân Phúc, the President of Vietnam and the third-ranking member of the 2020–25 term of the CMC, voluntarily resigned from all state and party offices at the 3rd Extraordinary Plenary Session of the 13th Central Committee on 17 January 2023.

== Sessions ==
The Central Military Commission is not a permanent institution. Instead, it convenes plenary sessions. When the CMC is not in session, decision-making powers are delegated to the Standing Committee. The Standing Board is not a permanent body either.

Sessions of the 2020–25 term of the Central Military Commission
Plenum	Date	Length	Ref.
1st Session	17 June 2021	1 day	
2nd Session	Not made public.	Not made public.	
3rd Session	16 December 2021	1 day	
4th Session	13 July 2022	1 day	
5th Session	19 December 2022	1 day	

== Officers ==
Title	Name	Portrait	BY	PM	Birthplace	Education	Ethnicity	Ref.
Secretary of the Central Military Commission (General Secretary of the Communist Party of Vietnam)	Tô Lâm		1957		Văn Giang District	Professor, Doctor	Kinh	
Deputy Secretary of the Central Military Commission (Minister of National Defence)	Phan Văn Giang		1960	—	Nam Định province	Graduate	Kinh	

== Composition ==
=== Standing Committee ===
Members of the Standing Committee of the 2020–25 term of the Central Military Commission
Order	Name	2015–20 CMC-SC		Birth	PM	Birthplace	Education	Ethnicity	Military rank	Ref.
Order	Name	New	Rank	Birth	PM	Birthplace	Education	Ethnicity	Military rank	Ref.
1	Nguyễn Phú Trọng	Old	1	1944	1968	Hà Nội City	Graduate	Kinh	—	
2	Phan Văn Giang	Old	6	1960	—	Nam Định province	Graduate	Kinh	General	
3	Nguyễn Xuân Phúc	Old	4	1954	1982	Quảng Nam province	Undergraduate	Kinh	—	
4	Phạm Minh Chính	New	—	1958	1986	Thanh Hoá province	Graduate	Kinh	—	
5	Lương Cường	Old	5	1957	1978	Phú Thọ province	Undergraduate	Kinh	General	
6	Nguyễn Tân Cương	New	—	1966	—	Hà Nam province	Undergraduate	Kinh	Colonel General	
7	Võ Minh Lương	New	—	1963	—	Quảng Bình province	Undergraduate	Kinh	Colonel General	

=== Members ===
Members of the 2020–25 term of the Central Military Commission
Order	Name	2015–20 CMC		Birth	PM	Birthplace	Education	Ethnicity	Military rank	Ref.
Order	Name	New	Rank	Birth	PM	Birthplace	Education	Ethnicity	Military rank	Ref.
1	Nguyễn Phú Trọng	Old	1	1944	1968	Hà Nội City	Graduate	Kinh	—	
2	Phan Văn Giang	Old	6	1960	—	Nam Định province	Graduate	Kinh	General	
3	Nguyễn Xuân Phúc	Old	4	1954	1982	Quảng Nam province	Undergraduate	Kinh	—	
4	Phạm Minh Chính	New	—	1958	1986	Thanh Hoá province	Graduate	Kinh	—	
5	Lương Cường	Old	5	1957	1978	Phú Thọ province	Undergraduate	Kinh	General	
6	Nguyễn Tân Cương	Old	12	1966	—	Hà Nam province	Undergraduate	Kinh	Colonel General	
7	Võ Minh Lương	Old	16	1963	—	Quảng Bình province	Undergraduate	Kinh	Colonel General	
8	Hoàng Xuân Chiến	Old	18	1961	—	Hưng Yên province	Graduate	Kinh	Colonel General	
9	Vũ Hải Sản	Old	22	1961	1983	Nam Định province	Undergraduate	Kinh	Colonel General	
10	Lê Huy Vịnh	Old	15	1961	—	Hà Nội City	Graduate	Kinh	Colonel General	
11	Phạm Hoài Nam	Old	14	1967	—	Bình Định province	Graduate	Kinh	Colonel General	
12	Trịnh Văn Quyết	New	—	1966	—	Hải Dương province	Undergraduate	Kinh	Lieutenant General	
13	Nguyễn Văn Gấu	New	—	1967	—	Bến Tre province	Undergraduate	Kinh	Major General	
14	Huỳnh Chiến Thắng	Old	17	1965	—	Bến Tre province	Undergraduate	Kinh	Colonel General	
15	Trần Việt Khoa	Old	20	1965	1985	Vĩnh Phúc province	Graduate	Kinh	Colonel General	
16	Trần Thanh Nghiêm	New	—	1970	—	Hà Nam province	Undergraduate	Kinh	Rear Admiral	
17	Nguyễn Văn Hiền	New	—	1967	—	Thái Bình province	Undergraduate	Kinh	Major General	
18	Lê Đức Thái	New	—	1967	—	Quảng Ninh province	Undergraduate	Kinh	Lieutenant General	
19	Nguyễn Hồng Thái	New	—	1969	1987	Hưng Yên province	Undergraduate	Kinh	Lieutenant General	
20	Nguyễn Quang Ngọc	New	—	1968	1988	Nam Định province	Undergraduate	Kinh	Lieutenant General	
21	Nguyễn Doãn Anh	New	—	1967	1987	Hà Tây province	Graduate	Kinh	Lieutenant General	
22	Thái Đại Ngọc	New	—	1966	—	Đà Nẵng City	Undergraduate	Kinh	Lieutenant General	
23	Nguyễn Trường Thắng	New	—	1970	—	Bình Dương province	Undergraduate	Kinh	Major General	
24	Trần Quang Phương	Old	21	1961	—	Quảng Ngãi province	Undergraduate	Kinh	Colonel General	
25	Trần Hồng Minh	New	—	1967	—	Hà Nội City	Graduate	Kinh	Lieutenant General	

== Bibliography ==
- Truong, Mai (2022). "Declining opportunities for speaking out: The impact of Vietnam's new leadership on grassroots collective action". Asian Journal of Comparative Politics. OnlineFirst: 50–68. doi:10.1177/20578911221139764. S2CID 254009559.
