= 1st Politburo =

1st Politburo may refer to:

- 1st Central Bureau of the Chinese Communist Party
- 1st Politburo of the Communist Party of Cuba, 1975–1980
- 1st Politburo of the Lao People's Revolutionary Party, 1955–1972
- 1st Standing Committee of the Indochinese Communist Party, 1935–1951
- 1st Political Committee of the Workers' Party of North Korea, 1946–1948
- 1st Political Committee of the Workers' Party of South Korea, 1946–1949
