= 3rd Politburo of the Workers' Party of Vietnam =

Politburo of Vietnam's Communist Party

The 3rd Politburo of the Workers' Party of Vietnam (WPV), formally the 3rd Political Bureau of the Central Committee of the Workers' Party of Vietnam (Vietnamese: Bộ Chính trị Ban Chấp hành trung ương Đảng Lao động Việt Nam III), was elected at the 1st Plenary Session of the 3rd Central Committee in the immediate aftermath of the 3rd National Congress.

== Composition ==
=== Members ===
Members of the 3rd Politburo of the Workers' Party of Vietnam
Rank	Name	2nd POL		4th POL		Birth	PM	Birthplace	Education	Ethnicity	Gender	Ref.
Rank	Name	New	Rank	New	Rank	Birth	PM	Birthplace	Education	Ethnicity	Gender	Ref.
1	Hồ Chí Minh	Old	1	Died	—	1890	1930	Nghệ An province	Marxist studies	Kinh	Male	
2	Lê Duẩn	Old	3	Reelected	1	1907	1930	Quảng Trị Province	—	Kinh	Male	
3	Trường Chinh	Old	2	Reelected	2	1907	1930	Nam Định province	—	Kinh	Male	
4	Phạm Văn Đồng	Old	6	Reelected	3	1906	1930	Quảng Ngãi province	—	Kinh	Male	
5	Phạm Hùng	Old	11	Reelected	4	1912	1930	Vĩnh Long province	—	Kinh	Male	
6	Lê Đức Thọ	Old	8	Reelected	5	1911	1930	Nam Định province	—	Kinh	Male	
7	Võ Nguyễn Giáp	Old	5	Reelected	6	1911	1930	Quảng Bình province	—	Kinh	Male	
8	Nguyễn Chí Thanh	Old	7	Died	—	1914	1937	Thừa Thiên Huế province	Military science	Kinh	Male	
9	Nguyễn Duy Trinh	Old	10	Reelected	7	1910	1930	Nghệ An province	—	Kinh	Male	
10	Lê Thanh Nghị	Old	12	Reelected	8	1911	1930	Hải Dương province	—	Kinh	Male	
11	Hoàng Văn Hoan	Old	9	Not	—	1905	1930	Nghệ An province	—	Kinh	Male	
12	Văn Tiến Dũng	By-election	15	Reelected	10	1917	1937	Hà Nội City	—	Kinh	Male	
13	Trần Quốc Hoàn	By-election	14	Reelected	9	1916	1934	Nghệ An province	—	Kinh	Male	

=== Alternates ===
Alternates of the 3rd Politburo of the Workers' Party of Vietnam
Rank	Name	2nd POL		4th POL		Birth	PM	Birthplace	Education	Ethnicity	Gender	Ref.
Rank	Name	New	Rank	New	Rank	Birth	PM	Birthplace	Education	Ethnicity	Gender	Ref.
14	Trần Quốc Hoàn	New	—	By-election	15	1916	1934	Nghệ An province	—	Kinh	Male	
15	Văn Tiến Dũng	New	—	By-election	14	1917	1937	Hà Nội City	—	Kinh	Male	

== Bibliography ==
- Chân dung 19 ủy viên Bộ Chính trị khóa XII
