= 5th National Congress of the Communist Party of Vietnam =

- The flag of the Communist Party of Vietnam
- Date: 27–31 March 1982 (5 days)
- Location: Ba Đình Conference Hall
- Participants: 1,033 delegates (which includes the members of the 4th Central Committee)
- Outcome: The election of the 5th Central Committee

The 5th National Congress of the Communist Party of Vietnam (Vietnamese: Đại hội Đảng Cộng sản Việt Nam V) was held in Ba Đình Hall, Hanoi from 27–31 March 1982. The congress occurs once every five years. A total of 1,033 delegates represented the party's 1.727 million card-carrying members.

== Preparations ==
The 5th National Congress was postponed several times (it was actually planned to be held in late-1981). The Congress was preceded by two exceptionally lengthy Central Committee plenums. The reason for the congress' postponement was a divided central leadership, factional infighting and corruption within the party. The Central Committee, and the entire Party, had prepared for the 5th National Congress for over a year. Local party congresses held on every level of the party's hierarchy discussed the draft of the Political Report.

== Participants ==
1,033 delegates were elected to represent the party's 1,700,000 members. Other figures at the Congress were retired war veterans who had contributed to the socialist revolution, intellectuals and public figures. 47 foreign delegates were represented at the congress, all of them being communist and workers' organizations, with the exception of a delegation representing the magazine Problems of Peace and Socialism. Among the parties represented were the Communist Party of the Soviet Union (CPSU), the Lao People's Revolutionary Party (LPRP), the Kampuchean People's Revolutionary Party (KPRP), the French Communist Party, the Communist Party of Cuba and the Polish United Workers' Party.

== The Congress (27–31 March) ==
=== Opening ceremony ===
The 5th National Congress was held at the Bu Dinh Conference Hall, and at 09:00 local time the members of the Presidium of the 5th National Congress took their seats next to the foreign delegations from the CPSU, LPRP and the KPRP. Then a group of red-scarved children, members of the Ho Chi Minh Young Pioneer League, presented the members of the Presidium and the foreign delegates with flowers. This was followed by the opening speech held by Trường Chinh, the second-ranked member of the 4th Politburo. Trường asked the delegates and foreign representatives to observe a minute of silence for Ho Chi Minh, for Central Committee members, for ordinary Party members who died during the war, and for individuals who had participated in the country's liberation and reconstruction process. He then turned to the tasks of the 5th National Congress, which would:

review the implementation of the lines set forth by the Fourth Congress, give a correct assessment of achievements and shortcomings, get a clear view of the present economic and social situation, analyse the causes of successes and difficulties, and work out orientations, objectives and tasks of the 1981-85 period and the eighties as a whole, the major guidelines and measures aimed at bringing into play favourable conditions, overcoming difficulties, correctly solving important and urgent problems concerning the building of socialism and the defence of the fatherland, burning questions related to production and the people's life, to the strengthening of party building work, so as to take our people's revolutionary cause continually and steadily forward, and make a worthy contribution to the revolutionary cause of the world's people, the congress will decide on a number of alterations and amendments to the Party's rules and elect a new Central Committee.

Trường ended his speech by thanking the fraternal parties who were at the 5th National Congress, while at the same time highlighting the party's revolutionary character. The next speech was made by Lê Duẩn, the party General Secretary, who delivered the Political Report to the 5th National Congress. He was given a standing applause by the delegates, and his delivering of the report was interrupted by punctuated pauses.

=== Proceedings ===
The Political Report was a severe self-criticism of the party's work since the 4th National Congress. Lê Đức Thọ, the Head of the party's Central Organizing Committee, talked of the need of regenerating the party by attacking corruption and incompetence within it. The Political Report criticized the old age of party cadres. In his speech to the Congress, Lê Duẩn said that there were too many old cadres who had a limited understanding of how to perform their assigned tasks. He went so far as to question "the responsibility of the organs of the Party and of the State, from the centre to the base" when referring to the party's management of the economy. He asked the congress to initiate a new purification campaign of the party so as to remove "incompetent and degenerated elements who could not preserve their revolutionary quality and who harm the prestige of the Party." The purification campaign aimed to expel 150,000–200,000 members from the party.

In a report on the economic situation, and the Second Five-Year Plan approved at the 4th National Congress, Phạm Văn Đồng considered it was a failure. The plan's objective was to move Vietnam from an economy of archaic production to a system of "great socialist production" which was supposed to be based upon the development of light industry and agriculture. The first stage called for giving the people the essential needs to survive; however, this goal was not met and, during the plan, living conditions actually deteriorated. Nguyen Lam, the Chairman of the State Planning Commission, told of the failures of the Second Five-Year Plan to the National Assembly in December 1980. The plan was abandoned before the stipulated period.

Lê Duẩn blamed the failures on the fact that Vietnam was "still on the whole an economy of small production, which, moreover has undergone the devastating effects of prolonged wars." In his Political Report, Lê Duẩn endorsed the view that certain failures had come about because of inefficiencies within the economic system. At the 5th National Congress, he blamed "the deficiencies and the errors of the different bodies of the Party and of the State, from the centre to the base, in the economic and social direction and management." It was in light of these errors that the 6th plenum of the 4th Central Committee introduced the "two-way contract" system, which decentralized management and introduced certain material incentives for hard work. However, these reforms accelerated inflation, and made the economy even weaker.

Relations with Kampuchea and Laos were reaffirmed, with Lê Duẩn stating that the special relationships the countries shared were from "generation to generation". Lê Duẩn reaffirmed Vietnam's relations with the USSR. He stated, "Solidarity and co-operation with the USSR: such is the corner stone of the external policy of our Party and of our State." He further noted that their alliance was "a guarantee of the victory of the defense of the motherland and the socialist edification of our people." Soviet official Mikhail Gorbachev echoed Lê Duẩn's sentiments, stating "Vietnam can count on the solidarity and the support of the USSR."

== Bibliography ==
- "Fifth Vietnamese Party Congress". Contemporary Southeast Asia. 4 (2). Institute of Southeast Asian Studies: 246–265. September 1982. JSTOR 25797713.
- Trung, Thai Quang (September 1982). "The Fifth Congress of the Vietnamese Communist Party". Contemporary Southeast Asia. 4 (2). Institute of Southeast Asian Studies: 236–245. JSTOR 25797712.
