= Chairman of the Central Military Commission =

Chairman of the Central Military Commission may refer to:

- Chairman of the Central Military Commission (China)
- Chairman of the Central Military Commission of the Workers' Party of Korea

== See also ==
- Secretary of the Central Military Commission of the Communist Party of Vietnam
- Chairman of the Military Affairs Commission
