= 4th Politburo of the Communist Party of Vietnam =

Politburo of Vietnam's Communist Party

The 4th Politburo of the Communist Party of Vietnam (CPV), formally the 4th Political Bureau of the Central Committee of the Communist Party of Vietnam (Vietnamese: Bộ Chính trị Ban Chấp hành trung ương Đảng Cộng sản Việt Nam Khoá IV), was elected at the 1st Plenary Session of the 4th Central Committee in the immediate aftermath of the 4th National Congress.

== Composition ==
=== Members ===
Members of the 4th Politburo of the Communist Party of Vietnam
Rank	Name	3rd POL		5th POL		Birth	PM	Birthplace	Education	Ethnicity	Gender	Ref.
Rank	Name	New	Rank	New	Rank	Birth	PM	Birthplace	Education	Ethnicity	Gender	Ref.
1	Lê Duẩn	Old	1	Reelected	1	1907	1930	Quảng Trị Province	—	Kinh	Male	
2	Trường Chinh	Old	2	Reelected	2	1907	1930	Nam Định province	—	Kinh	Male	
3	Phạm Văn Đồng	Old	3	Reelected	3	1906	1930	Quảng Ngãi province	—	Kinh	Male	
4	Phạm Hùng	Old	5	Reelected	4	1912	1930	Vĩnh Long province	—	Kinh	Male	
5	Lê Đức Thọ	Old	5	Reelected	5	1911	1930	Nam Định province	—	Kinh	Male	
6	Võ Nguyễn Giáp	Old	6	Not	—	1911	1930	Quảng Bình province	—	Kinh	Male	
7	Nguyễn Duy Trinh	Old	7	Not	—	1910	1930	Nghệ An province	—	Kinh	Male	
8	Lê Thanh Nghị	Old	8	Not	—	1911	1930	Hải Dương province	—	Kinh	Male	
9	Trần Quốc Hoàn	Old	11	Not	—	1916	1934	Nghệ An province	—	Kinh	Male	
10	Văn Tiến Dũng	Old	10	Reelected	6	1917	1937	Hà Nội City	—	Kinh	Male	
11	Lê Văn Lương	New	—	Not	—	1912	1930	Bắc Ninh province	—	Kinh	Male	
12	Nguyễn Văn Linh	New	—	Not	—	1915	1936	Hưng Yên province	—	Kinh	Male	
13	Võ Chí Công	New	—	Reelected	7	1912	1935	Đà Nẵng City	—	Kinh	Male	
14	Chu Huy Mân	New	—	Reelected	8	1913	1930	Nghệ An province	Military science	Kinh	Male	
15	Tố Hữu	By-election	15	Not	—	1920	1938	Thừa Thiên province	—	Kinh	Male	

=== Alternates ===
Alternates of the 4th Politburo of the Communist Party of Vietnam
Rank	Name	3rd POL		5th POL		Birth	PM	Birthplace	Education	Ethnicity	Gender	Ref.
Rank	Name	New	Rank	New	Rank	Birth	PM	Birthplace	Education	Ethnicity	Gender	Ref.
15	Tố Hữu	New	—	By-election	15	1920	1938	Thừa Thiên province	—	Kinh	Male	
16	Võ Văn Kiệt	New	—	Member	10	1922	1939	Vĩnh Long province	—	Kinh	Male	
17	Đỗ Mười	New	—	Member	11	1917	1939	Hà Nội City	—	Kinh	Male	

== Bibliography ==
- Chân dung 19 ủy viên Bộ Chính trị khóa XII
