= Foreign trade of Vietnam =

Exports of Vietnam by product category (2019) Chemical products Transportation Machines Mineral products Plastics and rubbers Metals Foodstuffs Precious metals Textiles Instruments Animal products Vegetable products Paper goods Footwear and headwear Miscellaneous Stone and glass Wood products Animal and vegetable bi-products Animal hides Arts and antiques Weapons

Vietnam's foreign trade has been growing fast since state controls were relaxed in the 1990s. The country imports machinery, refined petroleum, and steel; it exports crude oil, textiles and garments, and footwear. The balance of trade has in the past been positive but recent statistics (2004) showed that it was negative.

== History ==
In the 1980s, the Vietnamese government, acting under Communist Party supervision, continued to regulate and control all foreign trade. The Ministry of Foreign Trade managed trade and was responsible for issuing of import and export licences and approving any departures from the formal economic plan on an ad hoc basis. There was considerable division of responsibility, however, among high level agencies, financial institutions, state trading corporations, local export companies, and provincial and regional government bodies.

The role of planning in foreign trade became increasingly significant after June 1978, when the country formally joined the Soviet-sponsored Council for Mutual Economic Assistance (Comecon) and began to coordinate its five-year development and trade plans more closely with those of the Soviet Union and other Comecon members. Planning officials set trade goals on the basis of the overall planning targets and quotas required by bilateral trade agreements with various Comecon countries. The 1978 Treaty of Friendship and Cooperation between the Soviet Union and Vietnam, the most important of numerous such agreements with Comecon members, established the basis for the two countries' "long-term coordination of their national economic plans" and for long-term Soviet development assistance in technology and other crucial sectors of the Vietnamese economy. A 1981 Soviet-Vietnamese protocol on coordination of state plans during the Third Five-Year Plan set specific targets for bilateral trade and for coordination of Soviet machinery and equipment exports with plans for development of Vietnam's fuel and energy sectors.

After approval by the Council of Ministers, major trade programs were announced at national party congresses. The trade program announced in 1986 at the Sixth National Party Congress called for export growth of 70 percent during the Fourth Five-Year Plan.

Closer linkages between trade and general economic planning in the 1980s had mixed effects. Fluctuating commodities prices at home and market-oriented trade with, and investment from, Western countries were too uncertain to plan. Consequently, the Second Five-Year Plan was crippled when hoped-for Western investment failed to materialize. The joint planning approach was designed to enable Vietnam to minimize risk because it could count on stable supplies of important resources and equipment at concessionary prices, especially from the Soviet Union. Any delays or bottlenecks in the plans or aid commitments of Comecon countries, however, could delay or disrupt Vietnam's planning effort. In the early 1980s, for example, announcement of the Third Five-Year Plan was delayed until the Fifth National Party Congress of March 1982 while Vietnam waited for the Soviet Union to confirm its aid commitment. Similarly, Vietnam in the mid-1980s endured first reduction, then elimination of Soviet price subsidies for purchases of Soviet oil. The reductions were in accordance with the then general Soviet practice of avoiding oil price subsidies in order to keep Comecon oil prices close to those of the world market. The volume of Vietnamese trade suffered increasingly from some of the recurring problems that troubled planners in other Comecon countries during this period, including overly optimistic targets, problems of regionalism, priorities often driven by ideology, and chronic shortages of domestically produced raw materials and industrial commodities. By 1987 observers had concluded that, despite Vietnam's financial ties with Comecon, increased investment and trade from Western countries and other non-Comecon sources would be required for a general Vietnamese economic recovery (following Vietnam's incursion into Cambodia in late 1978, numerous Western and regional aid donors had withdrawn their support and imposed a trade boycott).

== Statistics ==
- The figures for 2012 for the entire Middle East show that trade was up by 30 per cent to US$4.86 billion, with the UAE forming the bulk of that figure, at US$1.48 billion.
- Exports to Russia were at US$2.27 billion and imports from Russia were US$1.39 billion in 2012.
