= 2nd Politburo of the Workers' Party of Vietnam =

Politburo of Vietnam's Communist Party

The 2nd Politburo of the Workers' Party of Vietnam (WPV), formally the 2nd Political Bureau of the Central Committee of the Workers' Party of Vietnam (Vietnamese: Bộ Chính trị Ban Chấp hành trung ương Đảng Lao động Việt Nam II), was elected at the 1st Plenary Session of the 2nd Central Committee in the immediate aftermath of the 2nd National Congress.

== Composition ==
=== Members ===
Members of the 2nd Politburo of the Workers' Party of Vietnam
Rank	Name	1st STC		3rd POL		Birth	PM	Birthplace	Education	Ethnicity	Gender	Ref.
Rank	Name	New	Rank	New	Rank	Birth	PM	Birthplace	Education	Ethnicity	Gender	Ref.
1	Hồ Chí Minh	Old	1	Reelected	1	1890	1930	Nghệ An province	Marxist studies	Kinh	Male	
2	Trường Chinh	Old	2	Reelected	3	1907	1930	Nam Định province	—	Kinh	Male	
3	Lê Duẩn	New	—	Reelected	2	1907	1930	Quảng Trị Province	—	Kinh	Male	
4	Hoàng Quốc Việt	Old	5	Removed	—	1905	1930	Bắc Ninh province	—	Kinh	Male	
5	Võ Nguyễn Giáp	Old	3	Reelected	7	1911	1930	Quảng Bình province	—	Kinh	Male	
6	Phạm Văn Đồng	New	—	Reelected	4	1906	1930	Quảng Ngãi province	—	Kinh	Male	
7	Nguyễn Chí Thanh	New	—	Reelected	8	1914	1937	Thừa Thiên Huế province	Military science	Kinh	Male	
8	Lê Đức Thọ	By-election	—	Reelected	6	1911	1930	Nam Định province	—	Kinh	Male	
9	Hoàng Văn Hoan	By-election	—	Reelected	11	1905	1930	Nghệ An province	—	Kinh	Male	
10	Nguyễn Duy Trinh	By-election	—	Reelected	9	1910	1930	Nghệ An province	—	Kinh	Male	
11	Phạm Hùng	By-election	—	Reelected	5	1912	1930	Vĩnh Long province	—	Kinh	Male	
12	Lê Thanh Nghị	By-election	—	Reelected	10	1911	1930	Hải Dương province	—	Kinh	Male	
13	Lê Văn Lương	By-election	13	Removed	—	1912	1930	Bắc Ninh province	—	Kinh	Male	

=== Alternates ===
Alternates of the 2nd Politburo of the Workers' Party of Vietnam
Rank	Name	1st STC		3rd POL		Birth	PM	Birthplace	Education	Ethnicity	Gender	Ref.
Rank	Name	New	Rank	New	Rank	Birth	PM	Birthplace	Education	Ethnicity	Gender	Ref.
13	Lê Văn Lương	New	—	By-election	—	1912	1930	Bắc Ninh province	—	Kinh	Male	

== Bibliography ==
- Chân dung 19 ủy viên Bộ Chính trị khóa XII
