= Bà Triệu Temple =

Coordinates: 19.93066°N 105.81880°E

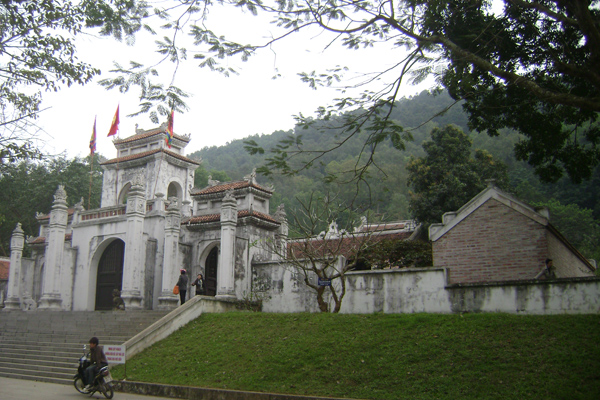
View from outside of the gate of Đền Bà Triệu at Hậu Lộc, Thanh Hóa

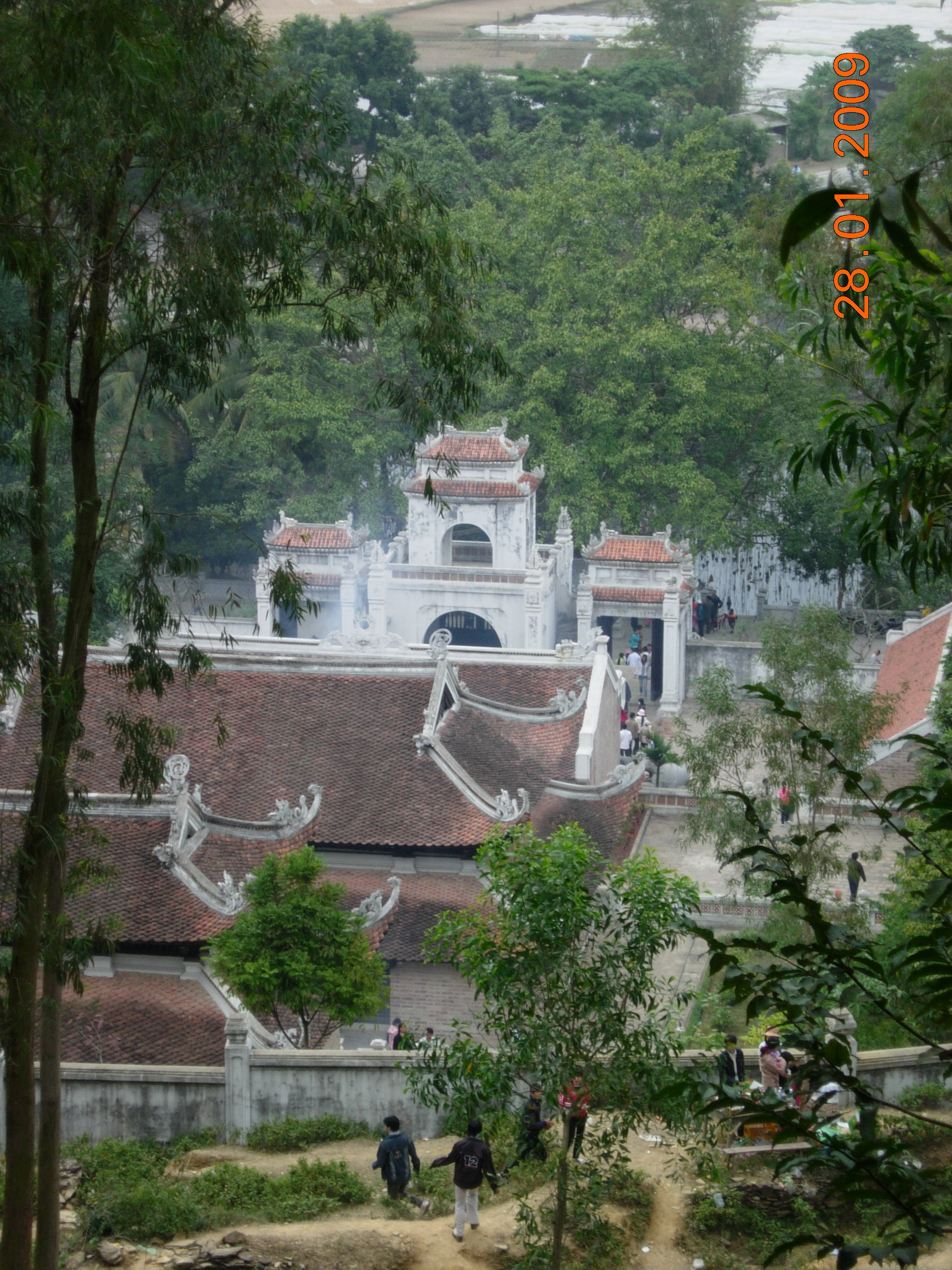
View from above of the Đền Bà Triệu

The Bà Triệu Temple (Đền Bà Triệu) is a temple at thôn Phú Điền, xã Triệu Lộc, huyện Hậu Lộc, Thanh Hóa province, Vietnam dedicated to the semi-legendary national heroine Lady Triệu (248 AD). The Bà Triệu Temple Festival takes place on April 3.
