= Hậu Lộc district =

Coordinates: 19.933°N 105.900°E

Hậu Lộc district Huyện Hậu Lộc
- District
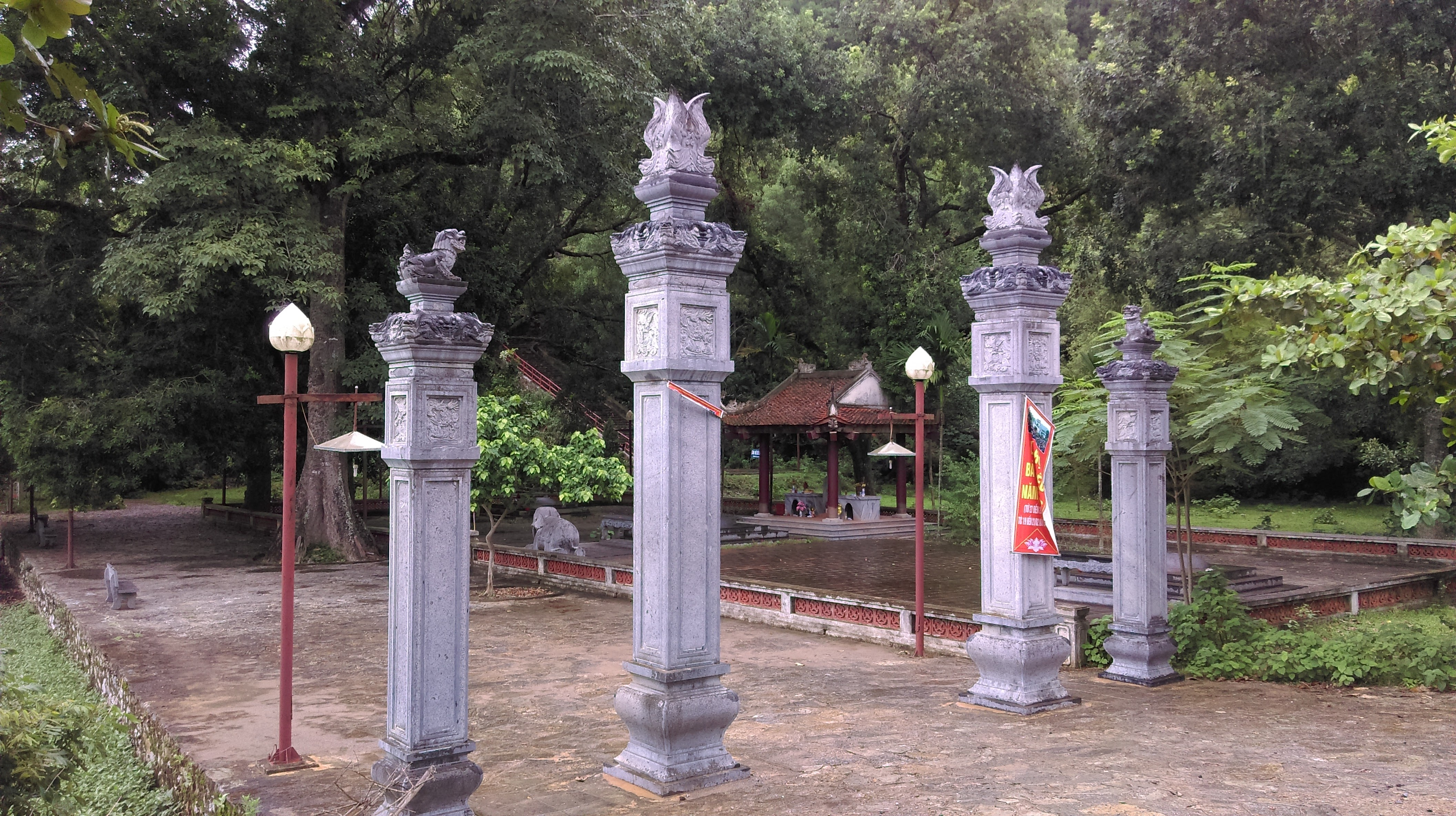
- Entrance to Lady Trieu (Bà Triệu) temple
- Interactive map of Hậu Lộc district
- Country: Vietnam
- Region: North Central Coast
- Province: Thanh Hóa
- Capital: Hậu Lộc

Area
  - Total: 54 sq mi (141 km^{2})

Population (2003)
  - Total: 183,852
- Time zone: UTC+7 (UTC + 7)

Hậu Lộc is a former district (huyện) of Thanh Hóa province in the North Central Coast region of Vietnam. As of 2003 the district had a population of 183,852. The district covers an area of 141 km^{2} (54 square miles). The district capital lies at Hậu Lộc.

The village of Phú Điền, in xã Triệu Lộc is the site of the Bà Triệu Temple.
