= Phan Anh =

Vietnamese politicians

Lawyer Phan Anh
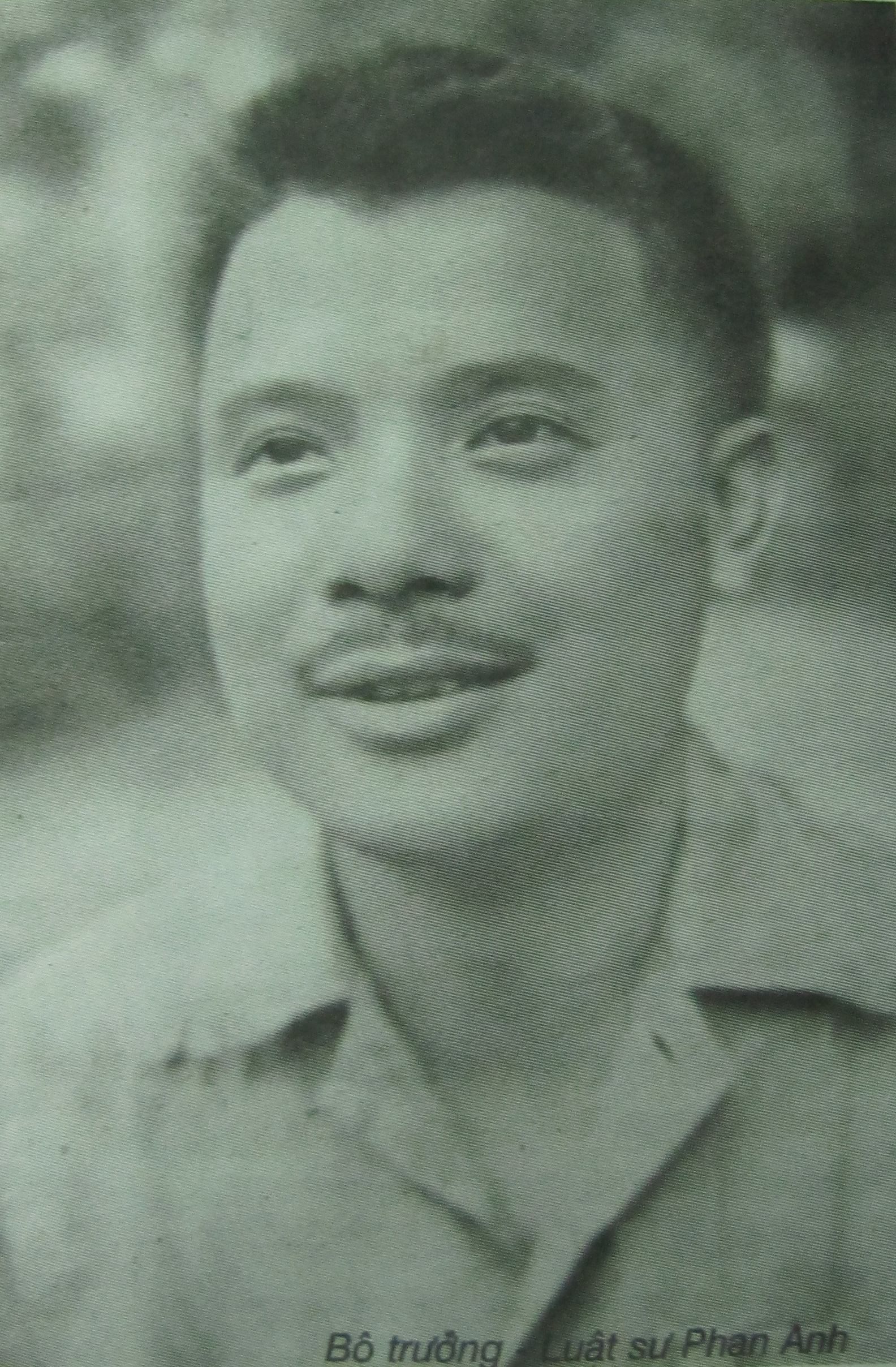
- First Cabinet of Empire of Vietnam

2nd Minister of Defence
- In office March 1946 – May 1946
- Prime Minister: Hồ Chí Minh
- Preceded by: Chu Văn Tấn
- Succeeded by: Võ Nguyên Giáp

Personal details
- Born: 1912 Đức Thọ, Hà Tĩnh, Annam (French protectorate)
- Died: 1990 (aged 77–78) Việt Nam

Military service
- Allegiance: Democratic Republic of Vietnam
- Branch/service: People's Army of Vietnam

Phan Anh (1912–1990) was a Vietnamese lawyer and politician. He was the Minister of Ministry of Youth in the first cabinet of Empire of Vietnam, the second Minister of Defence of Vietnam (March 1946 to May 1946) and held the position of Minister of Ministry of Industry and Trade from 1955 to 1976.

In 2020, Ministry of Home Affairs validated Phan Anh Foundation - a non-profit foundation established by Madame Đỗ Hồng Chỉnh (Phan Anh's widow), and historian Dương Trung Quốc, that supports and encourages culture and education development as well as community science.
