= Hậu Lộc =

- Commune
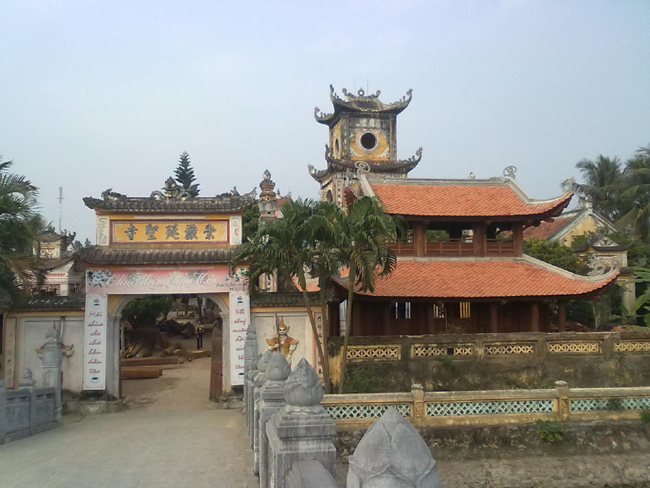
- Sùng Nghiêm Diên Thánh Pagoda
- Interactive map of Hậu Lộc
- Coordinates: 19.91436881602299°N 105.88484473190674°E
- Country: Vietnam
- Region: North Central Coast
- Province: Thanh Hóa
- Established: 16 June 2025
- Administrative headquarters: 568 Bà Triệu Street, Trà Giang Hamlet

Area
  - Total: 24.92 km^{2} (9.62 sq mi)

Population (2024)
  - Total: 33,315
  - Density: 1,336/km^{2} (3,460/sq mi)
- Postal code: 40406
- Website: hauloc.thanhhoa.gov.vn

Hậu Lộc is a commune in Thanh Hóa province, Vietnam. The commune inherited its name from the former Hậu Lộc district.

On 16 June 2025, Hậu Lộc district was dissolved as part of the 2025 Vietnamese administrative reform, which abolished the district-level administrative system. Hậu Lộc Commune was established under Resolution No. 1686/NQ-UBTVQH15 of the Standing Committee of the National Assembly of Vietnam, through the merger of the entire area and population of Hậu Lộc township and Thuần Lộc, Mỹ Lộc, and Lộc Sơn communes.
