= Văn Tiến Dũng =

Vietnamese general (1917–2002)

General Văn Tiến Dũng
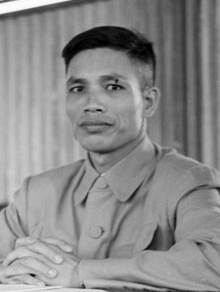
- Dũng in 1954

Secretary of the Central Military–Party Committee of the Communist Party
- In office 1984–1986
- Preceded by: Lê Duẩn
- Succeeded by: Trường Chinh

6th Minister of Defence
- In office February 1980 – February 1987
- Prime Minister: Phạm Văn Đồng
- Preceded by: Võ Nguyên Giáp
- Succeeded by: Lê Đức Anh

2nd Chief of General Staff
- In office 1953–1954
- Preceded by: Hoàng Văn Thái
- Succeeded by: Hoàng Văn Thái
- In office 1954–1978
- Preceded by: Hoàng Văn Thái
- Succeeded by: Lê Trọng Tấn

Member of the Politburo
- In office 20 December 1976 – 18 December 1986

Personal details
- Born: 2 May 1917 Từ Liêm, Vietnam, French Indochina
- Died: 17 March 2002 (aged 84) Hanoi, Vietnam
- Party: Communist Party of Vietnam (1936–1986)
- Awards: Gold Star Order; Ho Chi Minh Order; Military Exploit Order; Resolution for Victory Order
- Nickname: Lê Hoài

Military service
- Allegiance: Vietnam
- Branch/service: (North Vietnam) Việt Minh; People's Army of Vietnam
- Years of service: 1945–1986
- Rank: General
- Commands: Vietnam People's Army
- Battles/wars: World War II; First Indochina War; Siege of Điện Biên Phủ; Vietnam War; Easter Offensive; 1975 spring offensive; Fall of Saigon; Cambodian–Vietnamese War; Sino-Vietnamese War

Văn Tiến Dũng (Vietnamese: [van tǐən zǔŋmˀ]; 2 May 1917 – 17 March 2002) was a Vietnamese general in the People's Army of Vietnam (PAVN), PAVN chief of staff (1954–1974); PAVN commander in chief (1975–1980); member of the Central Military–Party Committee (CMPC) (1984–1986) and Socialist Republic of Vietnam defense minister (1980–1987).

== Military career ==
Born in Cổ Nhuế commune, Từ Liêm District, Hà Nội of Tonkin (French protectorate) to a craftsman family, Văn Tiến Dũng took part in some democracy movements and public struggles of Hà Nội workers since 1936, joined the Indochinese Communist Party in 1937. He was imprisoned by French colonial authorities three times and escaped from prisons successfully two times between 1939 and 1944.

In the August Revolution, Dũng directed the armed forces to seize power in the province of Hòa Bình, Ninh Bình and Thanh Hóa. In 1951, he was appointed as a commander commissar of the newly formed Brigade 320. By November 1953, during the First Indochina War, he rose to Chief of Staff of the Vietnam People's Army under General Võ Nguyên Giáp prior to the siege of Điện Biên Phủ in 1954.

He commanded the vital Tri-Thien-Hue Front during the 1972 Easter Offensive, replacing his mentor as PAVN commander in chief in 1974, when the Vietnam War against the Americans and South Vietnamese evolved from a guerrilla struggle into a more conventional war.

Dũng planned and commanded the 1975 spring offensive, which overwhelmed South Vietnamese defenses and captured Saigon in 1975. He also directed Vietnam's invasion of Khmer Rouge Cambodia and the resulting border conflict with the People's Republic of China in 1979. He was appointed defence minister in 1980. He retired in December 1986 at the 6th National Congress of the Communist Party of Vietnam.

Văn Tiến Dũng died on 17 March 2002 in Hanoi, at the age of 84.
