= 6th Politburo of the Communist Party of Vietnam =

Politburo of Vietnam's Communist Party

The 6th Politburo of the Communist Party of Vietnam (CPV), formally the 6th Political Bureau of the Central Committee of the Communist Party of Vietnam (Vietnamese: Bộ Chính trị Ban Chấp hành trung ương Đảng Cộng sản Việt Nam Khoá VI), was elected at the 1st Plenary Session of the 6th Central Committee in the immediate aftermath of the 6th National Congress.

== Composition ==
=== Members ===
Members of the 6th Politburo of the Communist Party of Vietnam
Rank	Name	5th POL		7th POL		Birth	PM	Birthplace	Education	Ethnicity	Gender	Ref.
Rank	Name	New	Rank	New	Rank	Birth	PM	Birthplace	Education	Ethnicity	Gender	Ref.
1	Nguyễn Văn Linh	Old	14	Not	—	1915	1936	Hưng Yên province	—	Kinh	Male	
2	Phạm Hùng	Old	4	Died	2	1912	1930	Vĩnh Long province	—	Kinh	Male	
3	Võ Chí Công	Old	7	Not	—	1912	1935	Đà Nẵng City	—	Kinh	Male	
4	Đỗ Mười	Old	11	Reelected	1	1917	1939	Hà Nội City	—	Kinh	Male	
5	Võ Văn Kiệt	Old	10	Reelected	3	1922	1939	Vĩnh Long province	—	Kinh	Male	
6	Lê Đức Anh	Old	12	Reelected	2	1920	1938	Thừa Thiên Huế province	—	Kinh	Male	
7	Nguyễn Đức Tâm	Old	13	Not	—	1920	1944	Thái Bình province	—	Kinh	Male	
8	Nguyễn Cơ Thạch	Alternate	15	Not	—	1921	1943	Nam Định province	—	Kinh	Male	
9	Đồng Sĩ Nguyên	Alternate	16	Not	—	1923	1938	Quảng Bình province	Military science	Kinh	Male	
10	Trần Xuân Bách	New	—	Removed	—	1924	—	Nam Định province	—	Kinh	Male	
11	Nguyễn Thanh Bình	New	—	Not	—	1918	1939	Bắc Ninh province	—	Kinh	Male	
12	Đoàn Khuê	New	—	Reelected	5	1923	—	Quảng Trị province	Military science	Kinh	Male	
13	Mai Chí Thọ	New	—	Not	—	1922	1939	Nam Định province	—	Kinh	Male	
13	Đào Duy Tùng	By-election	14	Reelected	4	1924	1945	Phúc Yên City	—	Kinh	Male	

=== Alternates ===
Alternates of the 6th Politburo of the Communist Party of Vietnam
Rank	Name	5th POL		7th POL		Birth	PM	Birthplace	Education	Ethnicity	Gender	Ref.
Rank	Name	New	Rank	New	Rank	Birth	PM	Birthplace	Education	Ethnicity	Gender	Ref.
14	Đào Duy Tùng	New	—	By-election	13	1924	1945	Phúc Yên City	—	Kinh	Male	

== Bibliography ==
- Chân dung 19 ủy viên Bộ Chính trị khóa XII
