= 1st Central Bureau of the Chinese Communist Party =

The 1st Central Bureau of the Chinese Communist Party (Chinese: 中国共产党第一届中央局) was elected by the 1st National Congress of the Chinese Communist Party in Jiaxing, Zhejiang on July 31, 1921.

== Members ==
1. Chen Duxiu, Secretary
2. Zhang Guotao, Director of Organization
3. Li Da, Director of Propaganda.
