= 1st Standing Committee of the Indochinese Communist Party =

Before the Politburo, an organ with the same functions, known as the Standing Committee of the Central Committee, was the leading Party organ.

== Members ==
Standing Committee of the Central Committee of the Indochinese Communist Party since 1941: Trường Chinh (General Secretary), Hoàng Văn Thụ and Hoàng Quốc Việt.

Standing Committee of the Central Committee of the Indochinese Communist Party since 1945: Hồ Chí Minh (President of the Democratic Republic of Vietnam), Trường Chinh (General Secretary), Võ Nguyên Giáp, Lê Đức Thọ, Hoàng Quốc Việt, Nguyễn Lương Bằng (supplement).

== Bibliography ==
- Van, Canh Nguyen; Cooper, Earle (1983). Vietnam under Communism, 1975–1982. Hoover Press. ISBN 9780817978518.
