= 7th Politburo of the Communist Party of Vietnam =

Politburo of Vietnam's Communist Party

The 7th Politburo of the Communist Party of Vietnam (CPV), formally the 7th Political Bureau of the Central Committee of the Communist Party of Vietnam (Vietnamese: Bộ Chính trị Ban Chấp hành trung ương Đảng Cộng sản Việt Nam Khoá VII), was elected at the 1st Plenary Session of the 7th Central Committee in the immediate aftermath of the 7th National Congress.

== Members ==
Members of the 7th Politburo of the Communist Party of Vietnam
Rank	Name	6th POL		8th POL		Birth	PM	Birthplace	Education	Ethnicity	Gender	Ref.
Rank	Name	New	Rank	New	Rank	Birth	PM	Birthplace	Education	Ethnicity	Gender	Ref.
1	Đỗ Mười	Old	4	Reelected	1	1917	1939	Hà Nội City	—	Kinh	Male	
2	Lê Đức Anh	Old	6	Reelected	2	1920	1938	Thừa Thiên Huế province	—	Kinh	Male	
3	Võ Văn Kiệt	Old	5	Reelected	3	1922	1939	Vĩnh Long province	—	Kinh	Male	
4	Đào Duy Tùng	Old	13	Not	—	1924	1945	Phúc Yên City	—	Kinh	Male	
5	Đoàn Khuê	Old	12	Reelected	6	1923	—	Quảng Trị province	Military science	Kinh	Male	
6	Vũ Oanh	New	—	Not	—	1924	1941	Hải Hưng province	—	Kinh	Male	
7	Lê Phước Thọ	New	—	Not	—	1927	1949	Minh Hải province	—	Kinh	Male	
8	Phan Văn Khải	New	—	Reelected	7	1933	1959	Hồ Chí Minh City	Economics	Kinh	Male	
9	Bùi Thiện Ngộ	New	—	Not	—	1929	1947	Đồng Nai province	—	Kinh	Male	
10	Nông Đức Mạnh	New	—	Reelected	4	1940	1963	Bắc Kạn Province	Economics & carpentry	Tày	Male	
11	Phạm Thế Duyệt	New	—	Reelected	18	1936	1965	Hải Dương province	Mining engineering & economic management	Kinh	Male	
12	Nguyễn Đức Bình	New	—	Reelected	9	1927	1945	Hà Tĩnh province	Philosophy	Kinh	Male	
13	Võ Trần Chí	New	—	Not	—	1927	1946	Long An province	—	Kinh	Male	
14	Lê Khả Phiêu	By-election	—	Reelected	5	1931	1949	Thanh Hóa province	Military science	Kinh	Male	
15	Đỗ Quang Thắng	By-election	—	Not	—	1927	1946	Quảng Ngãi province	—	Kinh	Male	
16	Nguyễn Mạnh Cầm	By-election	—	Reelected	8	1929	—	Nghệ An province	Russian studies	Kinh	Male	
17	Nguyễn Hà Phan	By-election	—	Not	—	1933	—	Bến Tre province	—	Kinh	Male	

== Bibliography ==
- Chân dung 19 ủy viên Bộ Chính trị khóa XII
