= Võ Chí Công =

Vietnamese politician

His Excellency Võ Chí Công
- Official portrait, 1986

4th Chairman of the Council of State of Vietnam
- In office 18 June 1987 – 22 September 1992
- Leader: Nguyễn Văn Linh
- Preceded by: Trường Chinh
- Succeeded by: Lê Đức Anh

Permanent Member of the Communist Party of Vietnam Central Committee's Secretariat
- In office 31 March 1982 – 21 June 1986
- Preceded by: Lê Thanh Nghị
- Succeeded by: Nguyễn Văn Linh

Minister of Agriculture of Vietnam
- In office 2 February 1977 – 12 December 1979
- Prime Minister: Phạm Văn Đồng
- Preceded by: Võ Thúc Đồng
- Succeeded by: Nguyễn Ngọc Trìu

Chairman of the People's Revolutionary Party of South Vietnam
- In office 1 January 1962 – December 1976
- Preceded by: none (position established)
- Succeeded by: none (officially merged with the Workers’ Party of Vietnam to form the Communist Party of Vietnam)

Personal details
- Born: Võ Toàn; 7 August 1912 Quảng Nam, Annam, French Indochina
- Died: 8 September 2011 (aged 99) Hồ Chí Minh City, Vietnam
- Party: Communist Party of Vietnam (since 1935)

Võ Chí Công (Vietnamese: [vɔ˦ˀ˥ t͡ɕi˧˦ kəwŋ͡m˧˧]; born Võ Toàn [vɔ˦ˀ˥ twaːn˨˩]; 7 August 1912 – 8 September 2011) was a Vietnamese communist revolutionary, and the Chairman of the Council of State of Vietnam (Alternatively: President of Vietnam) between 1987 and 1992. He was the Standing Deputy Chairman of the National Front for the Liberation of South Vietnam from 1962 to 1976.

== Early life and political activities ==
Võ Chí Công was born Võ Toàn in Quảng Nam, French Indochina, in 1912. Võ Chí Công's father was Võ Nghiệm a patriot who later became a communist party member and a secretary, who was condemned as a martyr by the Vietnamese government. His mother Nguyễn Thị Thân was later conferred the Vietnamese title as Vietnamese heroic mother. He first became politically active in 1930, when he joined with nationalists who opposed the French colonial regime. He joined the Indochinese Communist Party led by Hồ Chí Minh in 1935, and fought with the Vietnamese resistance against the Vichy French and Japanese in World War II.

== Party leadership in the Central Region ==
In October 1941, Võ Chí Công was assigned to the newly re-established Party Committee for the Central Region, which was assigned to charge the provinces from Đà Nẵng to Phú Yên. In early 1942, the French colonial government terrorized the revolutionary movement in the central provinces, many Central Party officials and provinces were arrested, some temporarily left the area to contact the higher authorities. Võ Chí Công himself had to stay in the southernmost provinces of Central Vietnam, then proceeded to Đà Lạt to build a base. In June 1942, Secretary of the Quảng Nam Party Committee Trương Hoàn was arrested, sentenced to 20 years in prison by the colonial government, sent to Buôn Ma Thuột. In August 1942, Quảng Nam - Hội An - Đà Nẵng Provincial Party Committee was established by Võ Chí Công and after January 16, 1943, the three committees were merged. Võ Chí Công was elected as the Party Secretary of the new Quảng Nam Party Committee. In October 1943, due to the betrayal of a provincial commissioner named Cao Tiến Khai, Võ Chí Công and a number of provincial officials, Nguyễn Sắc Kim and Lê Bá were arrested by the French colonial government. Công was sentenced to life imprisonment, then reduced to 25 years imprisonment in Hội An laboratories, then transferred to exile in Buôn Ma Thuột.

On 9 March 1945, Japan overtook France Indochina. For the mobilization of the Vietnamese in support of Japanese rule, the Japanese military released many political prisoners, including Võ Chí Công. After his release, Công returned to Quảng Nam, assigned to the National Salvation Department of the Việt Minh in Quảng Nam Province, as leader of the Uprising, preparing to destroy the French government. As a result of his efforts and his comrades, as well as the quick initiative, the uprising took place in Quảng Nam, starting with Hội An, which took place on August 17, 1945. Quang Nam became one of four provinces to win The earliest government in the country. After the successful August Revolution, Công was appointed Chief Justice of Quảng Nam - Đà Nẵng.

== National Liberation Front founding member ==
After the First Indochina War, Công took charge of Deputy Secretary of the Party Committee of 5th Region (and elected is member of Central Committee Party in 1960), before becoming a founding member and Deputy Chairman of the National Front for the Liberation of South Vietnam (NLF) in 1961. He later became Deputy Secretary of the Central Office for South Vietnam (COSVN), and was a key figure in the communist party in South Vietnam during the Vietnam War. After the reunification of Vietnam in 1976, Công was awarded a seat on the national Politburo.

== Cabinet career and presidency ==
As a Politburo member, Công served in various cabinet posts, including Minister of Fisheries (1976–77), Minister of Agriculture (1977–78), and Deputy Prime Minister (1976–82), before becoming the Chairman of the Council of State of Vietnam (the contemporary equivalent of the President of Vietnam) in 1987. After his presidential term ended in 1992, Công became an advisor to the Central Committee of the Communist Party of Vietnam, until this advisory position was abolished in 1997.

== Death ==
Võ Chí Công died in Hồ Chí Minh City on 8 September 2011, aged 99. The Communist Party of Vietnam granted him a televised state funeral in recognition of his long political career.

Preceded by Trường Chinh	President of Vietnam; 1987–1992	Succeeded by Lê Đức Anh
