= Central Military Commission of the Communist Party of Vietnam =

Highest military policy body within the Vietnamese Communist Party

Central Military Commission
- Quân uỷ Trung ương
- Flag of the Communist Party of Vietnam

- Military flag of the Vietnam People's Army

Agency overview
- Formed: 1946
- Jurisdiction: Vietnam
- Agency executives: Tô Lâm, Secretary; General Phan Văn Giang, Deputy Secretary
- Parent agency: Central Committee of the Communist Party of Vietnam
- Child agency: People's Army of Vietnam

The Central Military Commission (CMC; Vietnamese: Quân Ủy Trung ương) is an organ of the Communist Party of Vietnam, which is the highest body in Vietnam on military policy and the ideological head the Vietnam People's Army (VPA) alongside the Ministry of National Defence, which is responsible for executive management of the People's Army and politically under effective influence of the CMC. Its membership includes some members of the Politburo and military leaders. The CMC is headed by a secretary, who is also the general secretary of the party.

== Functions ==
Practically, the CMC is the highest political governing body of the Vietnam People's Army, thus its head is also the practical highest leader of the military. The Statute of the Communist Party of Vietnam says that the VPA is "under the party's absolute, direct, comprehensive leadership", making it effectively the military wing of the ruling party. The membership of the CMC is appointed by the Central Committee. The CMC is responsible to the Party's Politburo and the Secretariat. Its main priority is to supervise party affairs within the VPA, from the very bottom to the top, which is represented by the General Political Department.

== Publications ==
The Commission publishes the People's Army Newspaper together with the Ministry of National Defence.
