= Trường Chinh =

Vietnamese political leader (1907–1988)

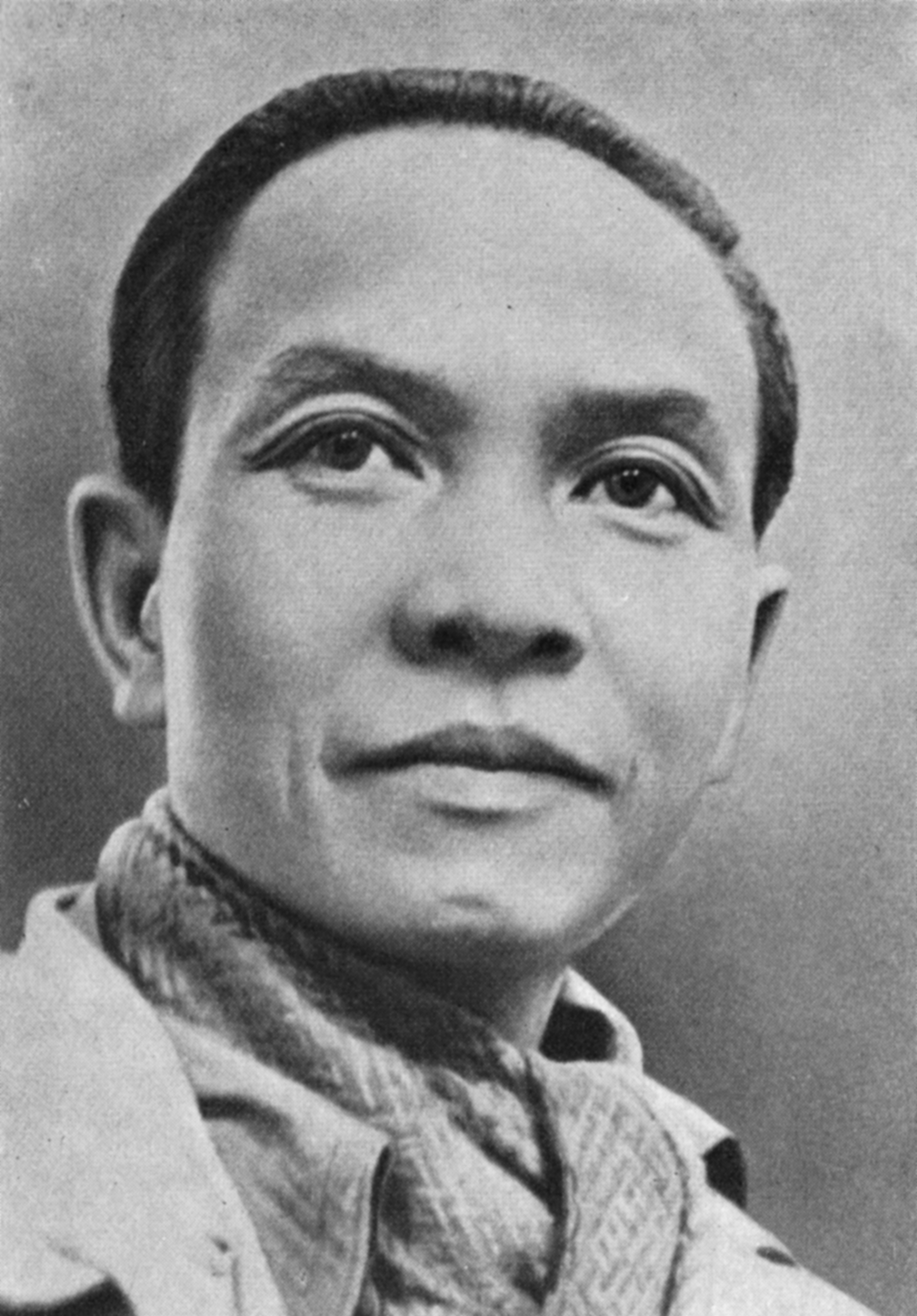
- Chinh c. 1951

General Secretary of the Communist Party of Vietnam
- In office 14 July 1986 – 18 December 1986
- Preceded by: Lê Duẩn
- Succeeded by: Nguyễn Văn Linh
- In office 9 November 1940 – 5 October 1956
- Preceded by: Nguyễn Văn Cừ
- Succeeded by: Ho Chi Minh

Secretary of the Central Military–Party Committee of the Communist Party
- In office 14 July 1986 – 18 December 1986
- Preceded by: Văn Tiến Dũng
- Succeeded by: Nguyễn Văn Linh

3rd Chairman of the Council of State of Vietnam
- In office 4 July 1981 – 18 June 1987
- Preceded by: Tôn Đức Thắng
- Succeeded by: Võ Chí Công

Chairman of the National Assembly of Vietnam
- In office 15 July 1960 – 4 July 1981
- Preceded by: Tôn Đức Thắng
- Succeeded by: Nguyễn Hữu Thọ

De facto leader of the League for Independence of Vietnam (Note: as General Secretary of the Indochinese Communist Party)
- In office 29 August 1942 – 20 September 1944
- Preceded by: Ho Chi Minh
- Succeeded by: Ho Chi Minh

Member of the Politburo
- In office 9 October 1940 – 18 December 1986

Personal details
- Born: Đặng Xuân Khu; 9 February 1907 Xuân Trường District, Nam Định Province, Tonkin
- Died: 30 September 1988 (aged 81) Hanoi, Vietnam
- Party: Communist Party of Vietnam (1930–1987)
- Spouse: Nguyễn Thị Minh

Trường Chinh (Vietnamese: [ʈ͡ʂɯɤ̀ŋ ciŋ̟], meaning "Long March"; born Đặng Xuân Khu; 9 February 1907 – 30 September 1988) was a Vietnamese communist political leader, revolutionary and theoretician. He was one of the key figures of Vietnamese politics for over 40 years, and played a major role in the 1946–1954 war against the French. Trường also played an important role in shaping the politics of the Democratic Republic of Vietnam (DRV) and creating the socialist structure of the new Vietnam. During his time in the Workers' Party of Vietnam he was considered the head of the Maoist camp.

Between November 9, 1940 and November 11, 1945, when the party dissolved, Trường was General Secretary of the Indochinese Communist Party Central Committee. Between 1946 and 1954, the First Indochina War led to the fall of French Indochina and the partitioning of Vietnam between north and south. On 19 February 1951, Trường became First Secretary of the Workers' Party of Vietnam Central Committee. After the failure of the land reform program in 1956, he was dismissed from his post of General Secretary and had less power.

Despite his dismissal as General Secretary, Trường Chinh remained an influential force in the party during the Vietnam War and after the reunification of Vietnam. He was Chairman of the National Assembly of Vietnam from 1960 to 1981 and head of state of Vietnam from 1981 to 1987 as 3rd President of Vietnam. Following the death of Lê Duẩn in July 1986, Trường again became General Secretary, and held the post until December 18, 1986. His last vital role was to carry forward the Đổi Mới renovation that still affects Vietnam to this day.

== Early life ==
Trường Chinh's name at birth was Đặng Xuân Khu. He changed his name to Trường Chinh, which means "Long March", in honor of the 6,000-mile military retreat of the Red Army of the Chinese Communist Party (CCP) between 1934 and 1936 led by Mao Zedong. He was born on February 9, 1907, in the Hành Thiện village, Xuân Hồng sub-district, Xuân Trường district, Nam Định province (in the area of the Red River delta, 120 kilometers from Hanoi). He was the oldest son among five children of the Đặng family which was an important family of the village. His siblings were Đặng Thị Yên, Đặng Thị Uẩn, Đặng Thị Tường, and Đặng Xuân Đỉnh. He grew up in a Confucian family which was not wealthy. His family background and his father highly shaped his knowledge and influenced him to join the anti-colonial movement. He learned Classical Chinese from his father and was sent to the district school.

His grandfather, Đặng Xuân Bảng, was a Confucian intellectual who worked for the Nguyễn court under the reign of Emperor Tự Đức and published many books about history, literature and Confucian ideology written in Hán scripts. His father was Đặng Xuân Viện who was a famous Confucian scholar and wrote many history books. Unlike his grandfather, Viện was not interested to work for the Nguyễn court. Instead, he participated in the Đông Kinh Nghĩa thục (Tonkin Free School) movement against French colonialism in 1907. Trường Chinh's mother was Nguyễn Thị Từ (1880-1964) who grew up in a Confucian mandarin family of the Nguyễn court. Trường Chinh married Nguyễn Thi Minh, who remained loyal and carried on the burden of looking after the family, especially her husband's family after he was jailed for his political beliefs.

=== Leader of student movement ===
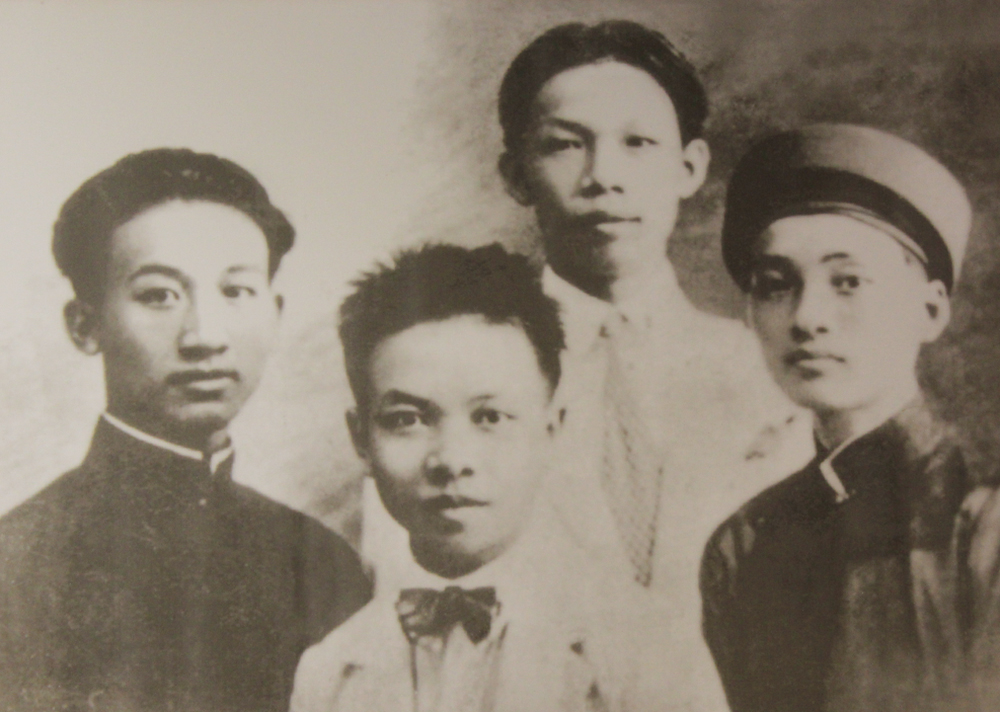
Trường Chinh (center) with his classmates in Thành Chung secondary school c. 1923–1926

In the midst of the political and social transition in Indochina, particularly the spread of French educational system in the nineteenth century. Trường Chinh was sent to educate in the French school, which was the starting point for his political movement. In 1923, he was sent to Thành Chung secondary school, the first secondary school for the local people and taught in the Western educational system, located in Nam Định province. In the school, Trường Chinh was inspired by the French philosophers’ works such as Jean-Jacque Rousseau and Montesquieu as well as the French Revolution and the 1911 Revolution. In Nam Định, he lived with a poor labour family who worked in the industrial factory. His childhood experience urged him to set up a student movement with his schoolmates, Nguyễn Văn Hoan, Đặng Châu Tệ, Phạm Năng Độ, Nguyễn Khắc Lương, and Nguyễn Đức Cảnh. This group, later on, joined the student movement in Tonkin. They published newspapers in order to spread their thoughts on the anti-colonial movement.

In 1925, when Phan Bội Châu, the respectful nationalist, was captured in China and brought back to Vietnam, Trường Chinh was in the second year in high school. He joined the nationalist movement and printed leaflets together with his friends demanding the release of Phan Bội Châu. This was the first time he personally participated in a political movement. His second involvement was a year after that. In 1926, the death of Phan Chu Trinh (Phan Châu Trinh), the well-known nationalist, led to the huge protests all over Vietnam. Trường Chinh and his schoolmates asked a permission from the local authority to organize a mourning for Phan Chu Trinh.

Trường Chinh became the head of the student movement in Nam Định and cooperated with other schools. Not only students but peasants, labourers, and villagers numbering more than ten thousand also participated in the Phan Chu Trinh commemoration. The gathering turned violent and, as a result, Trường Chinh and other student leaders were taken away by the police together with more than 200 people. After this event, the French colonial administrators kept an eye on him. He quit school in Nam Định. After that, he did self-study and passed the secondary school level exam. He moved to Hanoi to pursue his study in Indochinese trade college (trường Cao đẳng Thương mại Đông Dương). In Ha Noi, he still focused on political movement with his friends from Nam Định and wrote for newspapers.

=== Road to Communist Party ===
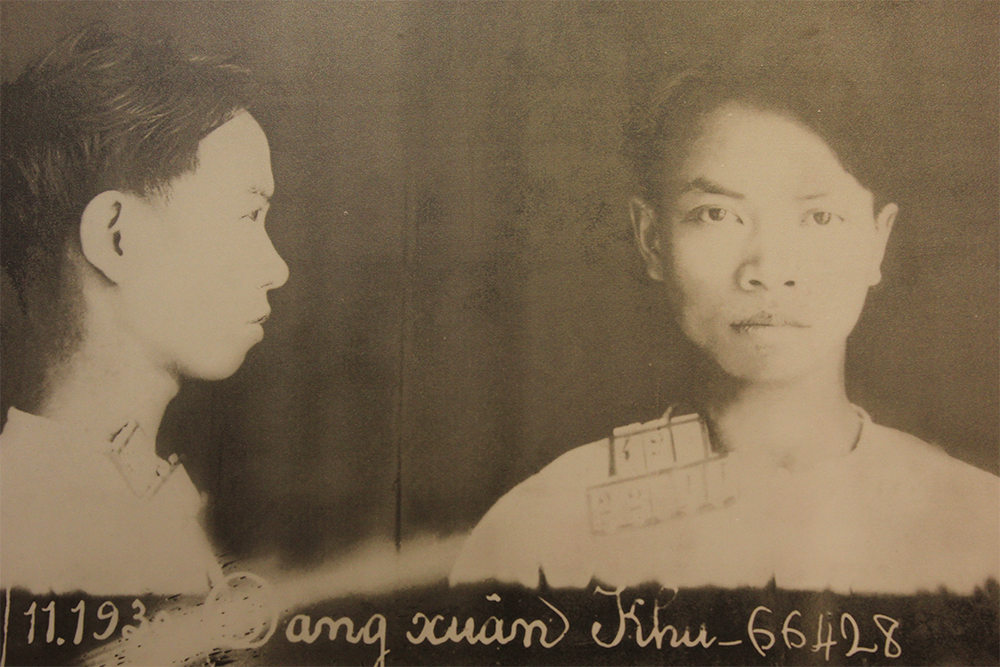
Mugshot of Trường Chinh at Hỏa Lò prison after his arrest c. 1930–1936

When Trường Chinh was in Ha Noi, he had an opportunity to choose his revolutionary path. In 1928, he joined the national salvation movement together with other Vietnamese young intellectuals. He read widely on Socialist works such as Marx and Engels, and Lenin. In 1929, he was one of first groups that founded the Communist Party of Indochina (1929–1930). He started to work on the Party's published works such as Búa Liềm newspaper and Người sinh viên newspaper aimed to educate the people on the Socialist path; at condemning the French colonial government and at arousing the local mass as to ally with the Party. However, in 1930, the Nghệ Tĩnh-Soviet movement and the Yên Bái mutiny started their own rebellion in Tonkin and this led the French colonial government to purge the political movement in Indochina.

In 1930 Trường Chinh became member of the Communist Party of Vietnam and was appointed to the Committee's propaganda of the Central Committee of Communist Party of Indochina. He was caught on November, 14th 1930 and was sentenced to twelve years, but was released in 1936. Although Trường Chinh was imprisoned for his political beliefs Hỏa Lò prison in Hanoi and deported Sơn La prison in Sơn La province for seven years, he was continuously active in the political movement. He was the leader of the Communist movement in the prisons where he published poems, articles, books about socialism and criticism of the Vietnam nationalist Party.

The colonial prison significantly became the revolutionary school for most of the intellectual revolutionists and communists. After release from prison, he continued his political movement, especially through his books and newspaper articles. He was a journalist, a writer, and a socialist intellectual who used his writings under various pennames such as Trường Chinh, Sông Hồng, Tân Trào, T.C. and S.T. to fight the French colonial government since he was a teenager. He was also a strategist for the Indochinese Communist Party.

== Political roles and ideology ==
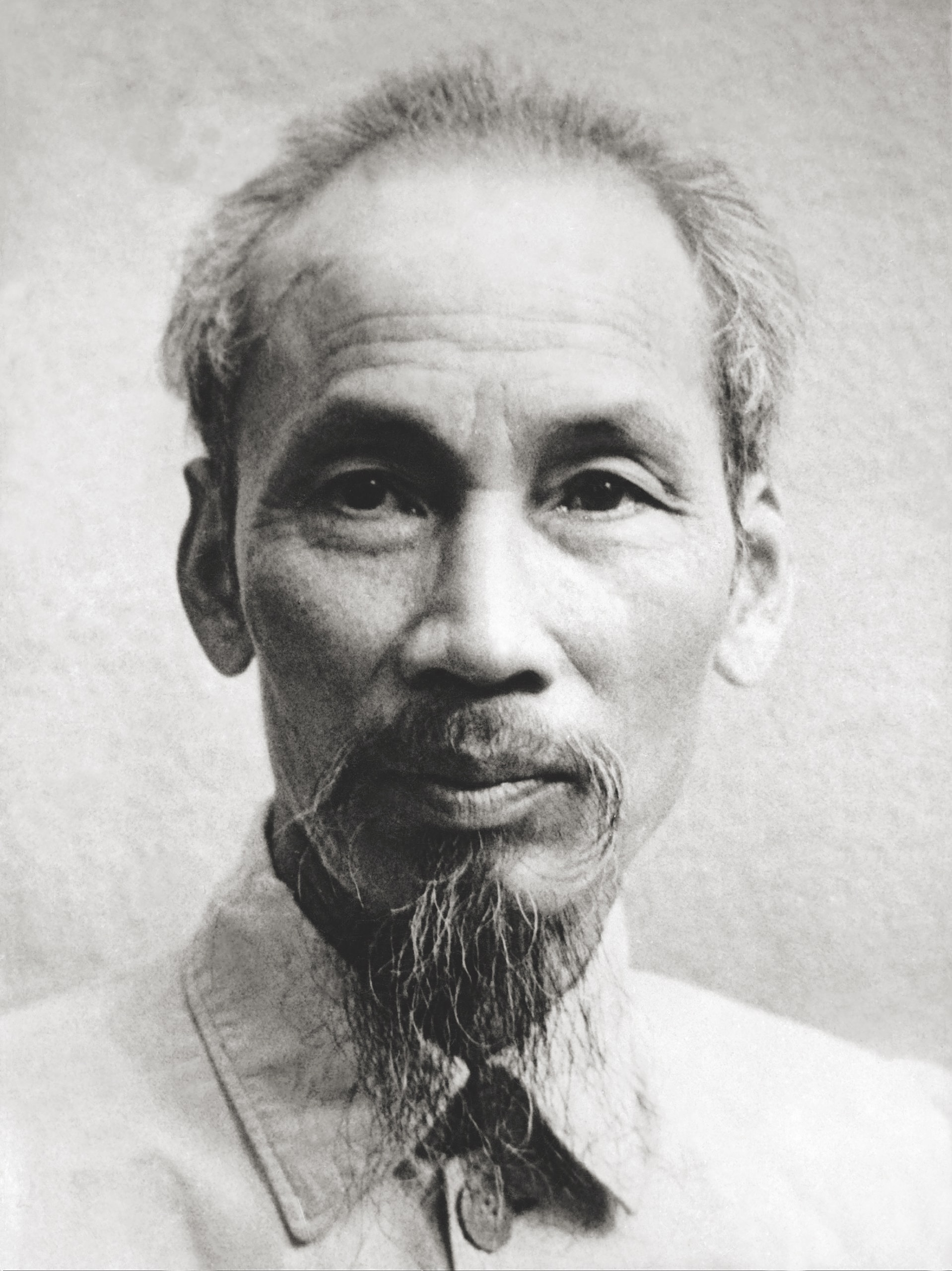
Hồ Chí Minh, founder and leader of the Communist Party of Vietnam.

Trường Chinh's ideology was inspired by Marxism and Leninism and he was influenced by Hồ Chí Minh, as seen from his works on including revolutionary ideology, political and revolutionary strategies as well as cultural strategies and policies. According to the Communist Party, Trường Chinh was "Ho Chi Minh's excellent student", although he did not always agree with Ho Chi Minh's ideas.

There are two main arguments about Trường Chinh's ideology. Firstly, his ideology was seen as radical and based on Mao Zedong Thought which is clearly evident in his published works and the pattern of the land reform program that he had borrowed from China. Secondly, it was a hybrid incorporating Marxism and Leninism that formed the core of Trường Chinh's ideology which supported the anti-colonial movement and did not oppose nationalism. His ideology firstly was influenced by the Soviet bloc, after that, China bloc, and was adopted in Vietnam contexts.

=== First Secretary of the Communist Party ===
Trường Chinh played a significant role in the Communist Party during the critical time in building and strengthening the Indochinese Communist Party (ICP) power. Besides Hồ Chí Minh, he was a central figure of the ICP in the independence formation of the Democratic Republic of Vietnam (DRV). In the 1940s, during the time that Hồ came back to Vietnam, Trường Chinh was already well known among the cadres of the Communist Party. He was portrayed as the radical leader of the Pro-Chinese faction while Hồ led the Pro-Soviet faction. During the Second World War, Trường Chinh became the famous Communist leader in the north. He served as the General Secretary of the Communist Party during a crisis when the French eliminated the leaders of the anti-French movement. In 1940, Trường Chinh was elected as the General Secretary of the Communist Party of Indochina.

He was the party's second ranking leader after Hồ Chí Minh. He was chaired of Party's National Conference in northern Tuyên Quang Province, launching an uprising to seize power from the French and Japanese. In the following years, the party fought a war for independence against French colonists.

=== August Revolution in 1945 ===
When Trường Chinh became a leader in the anticolonialist movement, he also adopted the strategic theses of the Chinese Communist Party (CCP). He therefore was the person who significantly determined the direction of the communist movement, as well as the think-tank in laying the foundation of modern Vietnam. In fact, he was highly regarded by the members and supporters of the communist movement. In addition, during the anti-colonial period, he and General Võ Nguyên Giáp developed a military strategy that enabled Vietnam to defeat the Japanese forces during the World War II. Trường Chinh emerged to play a crucial role in the August Revolution (Cách mạng tháng 8) in 1945.

However, the political situation in the 1940s was divided into factionalism. The two factions consisted of Hồ Chí Minh's and Trường Chinh's who obviously had different strategies, especially in the 1945 August Revolution. While Ho Chi Minh and his faction were based in Pác Bó in north Vietnam, Trường Chinh and his followers moved down to Hanoi and focused on the Red River delta. The center of the Communist movement, therefore, separated into two centers. After the success of the August Revolution in 1945 and until 1956, Trường Chinh faction was more powerful.

The August Revolution was a major turning point and it led to the declaration of independence in September of the same year. On the day of Vietnam's declaration of independence, Trường Chinh was one of the leaders of the Communist Party who stood with Hồ Chí Minh at the Ba Đình Square in Hanoi.

== Land reform campaign in North Vietnam ==
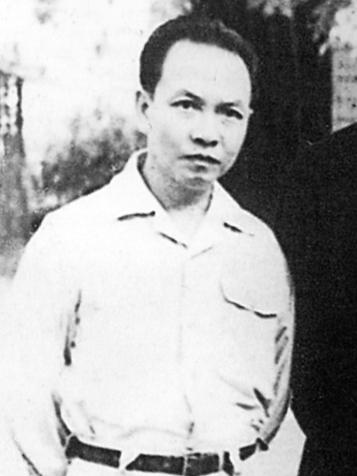
Trường Chinh in 1954

A blot in Trường Chinh's political life was the failure of the Land Reform campaign in the DRV between 1953 and 1956. The land reform campaign had a largely impact on Vietnamese society as it challenged the existing social and cultural structure. The land reform campaign was accompanied by extensive repression and excess, which resulted in the false imprisonment and execution of large numbers of people, many of whom were party members. The land reform was proposed and pushed by Trường Chinh as the Secretary of the Workers Party of Vietnam (Đảng Lao động Việt Nam). He aimed to change Vietnam to a new society which was neither feudal nor colonial society. He started developing his ideas of the land reform together with Võ Nguyên Giáp in 1938. Both had published their work The Peasant Questions (Vấn đề dân cày) which critiqued the social structure in Vietnam and the peasants’ problems in Vietnam. That work is praised from the Communist Party as the foundation of the understanding about agricultural system and Vietnamese peasants’ life.

Before the land reform, the party started implementing tax reduction policies to help farmers. However, later on, the goal was to expand the mass base by allocating land to the peasants who formed the majority in the country, as well as managing the feudal class.

The land reform was debated among the party's leaders. Trường Chinh had already been criticized for his unwillingness to agree with other party leaders and for his support of China while other leaders relied on the Soviet Union as their role model. While Trường Chinh was persuaded by other party members to use the Soviet model, he claimed that Vietnam was able to learn from China's land reform experience. In Trường Chinh's view, the party needed land reform to gain mass support by having a peasant revolution, overthrowing the landlords, and being a step in the liberation of Vietnam.

The party accepted Chinese guidance, because of its close relationship with China's leader, Mao Zedong. Trường Chinh admired Mao's ideological strategies and he adopted Mao's land reform campaign. Scholars have different opinions towards the land reform in Vietnam. Firstly, the land reform in North Vietnam was actually considered as a radical program and the adaptation of the CCP model was implemented between 1946 and 1953. The party leaders also used the land reform campaign "land to the tillers" for economic collectivization. However, another scholar pointed out that although Vietnam was mostly influenced by China, Vietnam's adaptation of the Chinese land reform had some differences to suit the Vietnamese context. The achievement of the revolution in China encouraged Vietnam to accept China as a model to design the policy and accept China as a consultant in policy implementation.

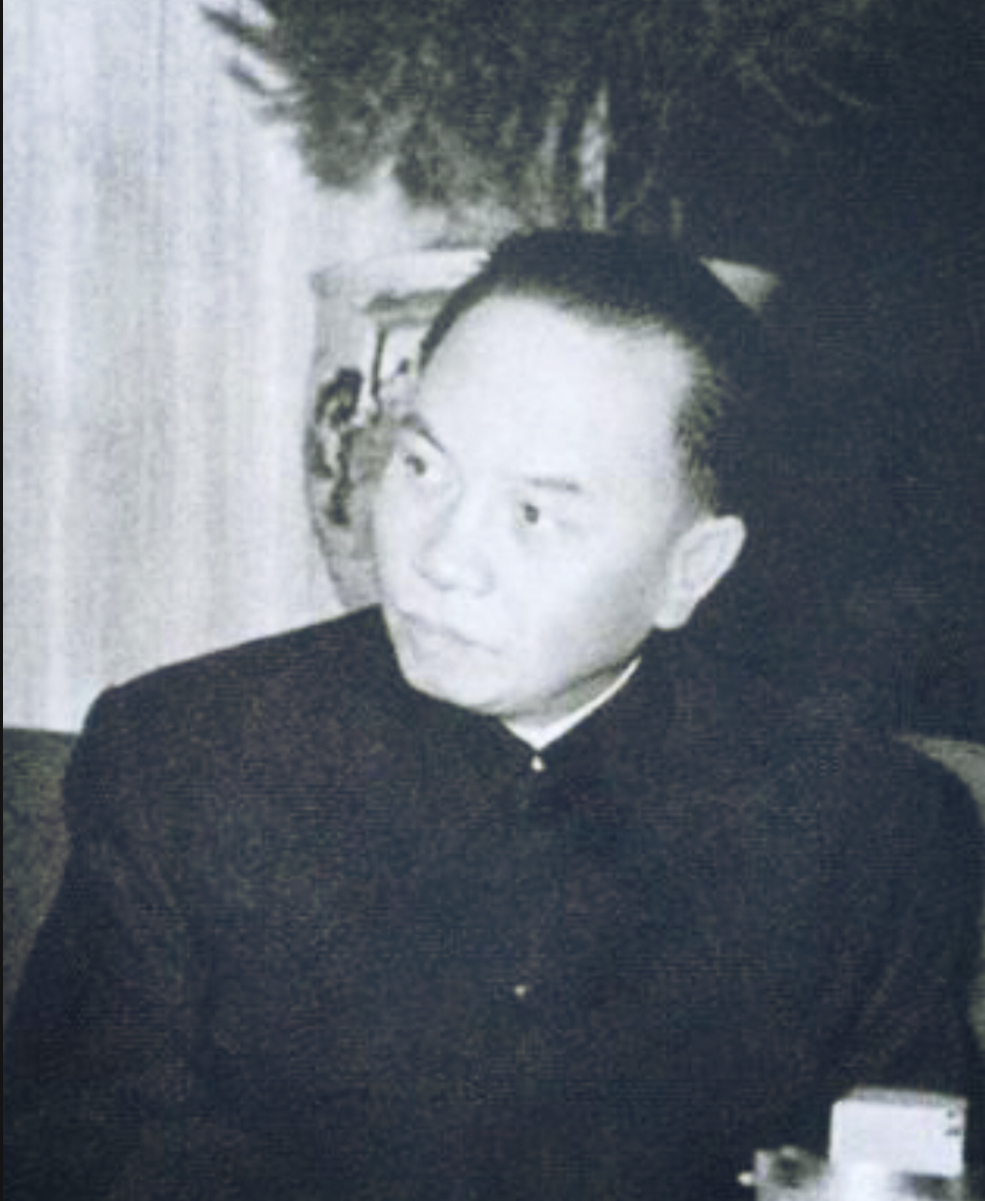
Trường Chinh in 1955

Trường Chinh presented the guideline for the land reform in April 1953. The Party passed the land reform decree and provided material support to the farmers. The land reform also aimed to strengthen psychological strategy to gain the support of the peasants. It also aimed to increase productivity and strengthen the war efforts against France. On December 4, 1953, the Legislature passed the Land Reform Act (Luật Cải Cách Ruộng Đất), which marked a significant change as its implementation also purposed at eliminating the feudal system of landlords.

Unlike in China, the land reform failed in Vietnam resulting in famine and widespread starvation. Over almost four years, many criticisms arose from the political leaders and Vietnamese peasants who claimed it a "bloodbath reform" because many people were killed and murdered. In addition, many people died from starvation. In 1956, more violence was reported which led to massive criticism and protests. The land reform was considered a failure of the communist party. Finally, the communist leaders had to terminate the land reform and Trường Chinh took responsibility by resigning from his post as General Secretary of the Communist Party.

However, the land reform was a significant path for the Worker's Party and the rural structure. The land reform was successful in, at least, helping the rural peasants to own land. The achievement of the land reform program indicated from the mass support from more than 200,000 peasants who willingly delivered supplies and crossed from mountains to valleys to support the Viet Minh to fight against the French troops.

Even though the land reform program was emphasized by many scholars as the failure of Trường Chinh, Hồ Chí Minh was the mainstay in pushing the program after he had sought advice from Stalin and Mao. After Hồ Chí Minh visited China and personally discussed it with Mao in 1950, the land reform program was finally launched in 1953. This period also marked the closest cordial relations between the CCP and the Worker's Party. Mao fully supported both advisor team led by Luo Guibo and provisions not only for the land reform program but also the war against the French.

Criticism was leveled at Trường Chinh and the Communist Party. As a result, the massacres of the people, especially the landowners, were also severely criticized by party members. Many party members preferred to use the Soviet Union path instead. Finally, Hồ Chí Minh, on behalf of the Party apologized with tears for the Party's mistake and held Trường Chinh responsible.

The failure of land reform in northern Vietnam was the turning point of the political faction. The Sino-Soviet split reduced China's influence in Hanoi. Trường Chinh resigned from his post of the secretary general of the Communist Party of Vietnam. Since then, Hồ Chí Minh supported Lê Duẩn, who later became the most powerful and longest-serving leader in Vietnam. In the 1960s, Lê Duẩn became the most powerful Communist leader while Trường Chinh was still on the list of the Politburo and a member of the central committee of the party. He still maintained his role in the party's think tank.

== Cultural ideology and strategy ==
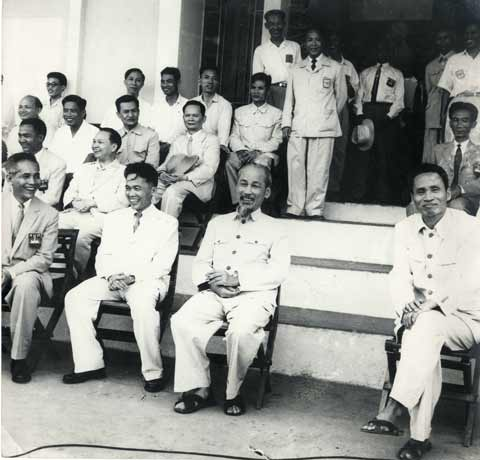
Trường Chinh (second row, second from left) watches a football game with Hồ Chí Minh (front row, second from left) and Phạm Văn Đồng (first row, far right) at Hàng Đẫy Stadium, Hanoi, 24 August 1958

After the declaration of independence in September 1945, Trường Chinh played an important role in shaping the administration of the Democratic Republic of Vietnam politically and economically, as well as creating the socialist structure and culture of the new Vietnam. He considered culture as a vital strategy for national liberation and nation-state building. In Vietnam, Trường Chinh was named as the architect of the foundation of the new culture of Vietnam because his cultural ideology had a great impact on Vietnamese society through many concrete ideas and policies. His works that have affected the Vietnamese society were the 1943 "Theses on Vietnam Culture (Đề Cương Văn hóa Việt Nam)" and the 1948 “the Marxism and Vietnamese Culture” (Chủ nghĩa Mác và vấn đề văn hóa Việt Nam).

In the first work, "Theses on Vietnam Culture," Trường Chinh presented two main cultural patterns: the foundation of the new Vietnamese culture under the leadership of the Communist Party, and the use of art and cultural concepts as a weapon against national enemies. He argued that Vietnam had fallen under the influence of Chinese culture of feudalism, French colonialism and Japanese fascists. In order to liberate Vietnam from these cultures, the Party needed to create a new culture (văn hóa mới). The essence of the new culture focused on people and adopted a new democratic approach. The second work, "The Marxism and Vietnamese Culture," Trường Chinh suggested the cultural revolution as a tool to fight the French colonial government under the principle of Marxism. The significance of culture was equal with the military and economic battle fronts. These two works became the fundamental elements to Vietnam society and culture and brought big changes to Vietnam society, particularly after the 1945 August Revolution. The key tool in eliminating the enemies of the nation was the expansion of the new democratic culture into the French-occupied cultural space as well as making the new democratic culture a national culture at the same time.

Cultural policy and the construction of the new culture of Vietnam significantly strengthened the nationalism through arts, performance, media and national history. Trường Chinh significantly built the Cultural Association for National Salvation in order to centralize artists who worked to publicize Party's ideology and appeal to local people for support. However, under the atmosphere of social restructuring was a large number of villagers who had some interactions with the landlord families became paranoid and fearful of the communists. The pressure to condemn the public's enemies finally led to the destruction of local social networks. Many people in North Vietnam were unable to withstand the pressure. Many of them committed suicide or escaped to South Vietnam.

The process of creating a new cultural space was to equalize people's status including anti-feudal symbols and linguistic patterns. The new cultural pattern was not always successful although the Party forced it through the propaganda campaign. In some communities, many villagers still respected the condemned feudal people. The fundamental ideology of Trường Chinh influentially and violently affected north Vietnam, particularly during the land reform. The cultural impact of the land reform led to social turmoil in many communities. Particularly during the land reform, the Party's cadres were sent to the communities and violently wiped out what they believed was the feudal legacy and backwardness including superstition, feudal cultures such as clothes, old traditions, and norms.

The landlords were charged with such offenses. Regardless of whether they were supporters of the Communist Party or not, they were judged as exploiters of the peasants. Furthermore, a group of the Communist supporters, called themselves as Nhân văn giai phẩm criticized the radical policy of Trường Chinh's cultural ideology during the implementation of the Land Reform program. However, many people in this group were jailed or forced to use the labour in the backcountry.

== Đổi Mới (Renovation) ==
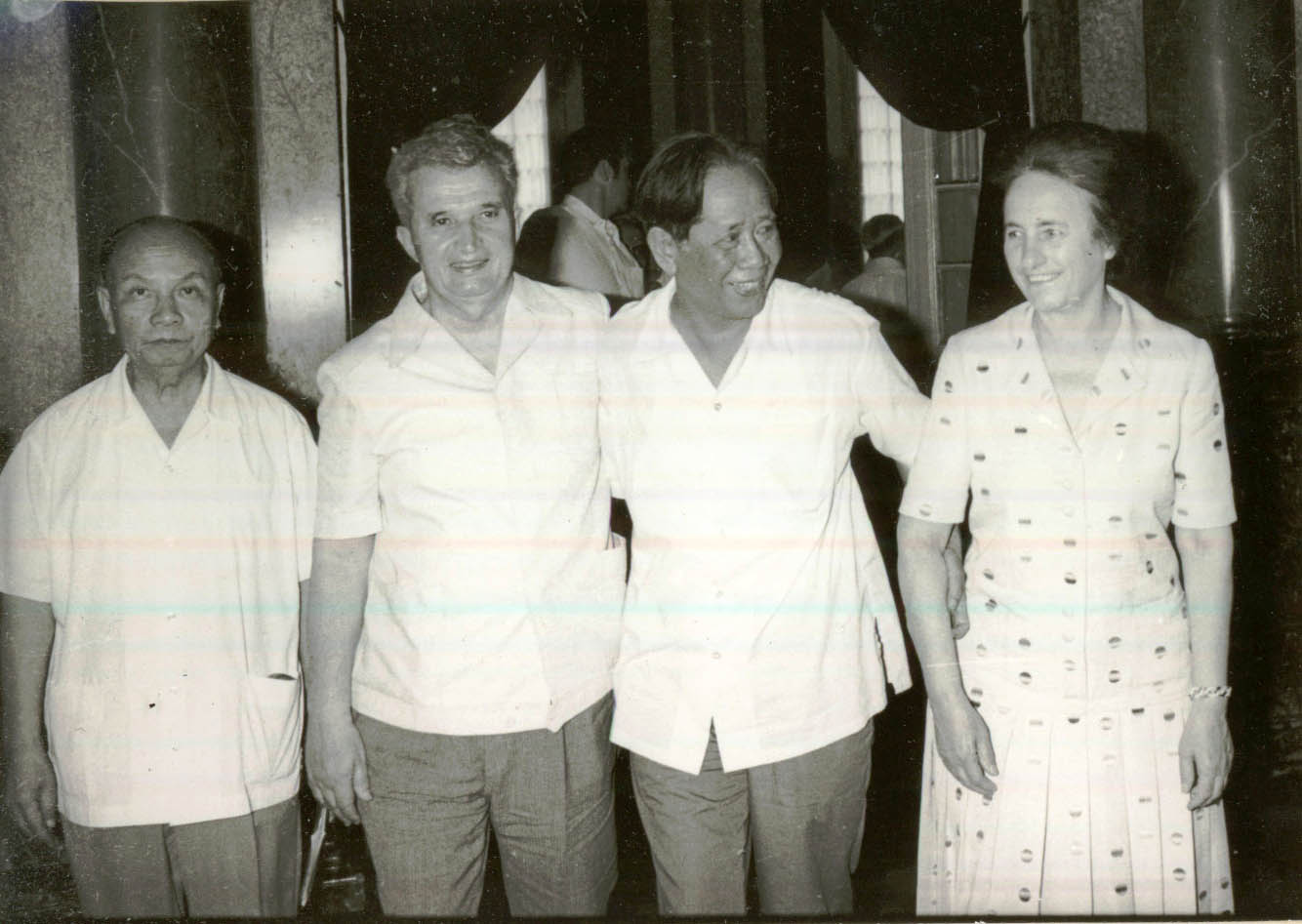
Trường Chinh (far left) and Lê Duẩn with Nicolae and Elena Ceaușescu from the Socialist Republic of Romania in 1978.

Vietnam was unified in 1975, and Trường Chinh was selected president in 1981. The economic renovation was credited to Nguyễn Văn Linh who succeeded General Secretary after Trường Chinh in 1986. However, Trần Nhâm writes that Trường Chinh was the first person who paved the way for economic renovation since 1968. In the midst of economic recession, scarcity and social crisis in the 1980s, the Central Committee received various reports about economic loss, inflations, and the increased social problems. Trường Chinh set up the research teams in order to collect and observe problems in local communities in the Central highland and in southern Vietnam as well as the success and failures from the old economic system.

Trường Chinh came to be receptive to reformists and gradually sided with them after visits to the countryside in 1983. He used the research results to reform policies and presented them to the Sixth National Congress in 1986. He suggested that economic renovation was not enough to deal with the crisis that Vietnam encountered. The Party also needed to reform political and social policies. Furthermore, he asserted that production capacity needed to be increased. Although, Socialist ideology rejected Capitalism, it could not avoid the economic acceleration by increasing production capacity. Instead of focusing on industrial sector, the Party needed to support and increase agricultural production as the root of Vietnam society.

In addition, the 1986 renovation (Đổi Mới) was driven by the changing world order that saw the collapse of the Socialist bloc and the domestic motivation within Vietnam, particularly among the Communist leaders. The economic renovation also affected areas such as politics in Vietnam and relationships among the Communist leaders, the vanishing financial support from the Soviet Union, the diplomatic policy in seeking for the economic cooperation within the region. In this economic transition, Trường Chinh was the new reformer as seen in the fellow communist leader Võ Văn Kiệt's writing in which he praised Trường Chinh as the only comrade who completely understood the real ideology of Socialism and also tried to principally adopt it in the society.

However, he was replaced by Nguyễn Văn Linh at the Sixth National Congress in December 1986, part of a sweeping leadership change that marked the beginning of the Đổi mới (Renovation) period.

== Final years and death ==
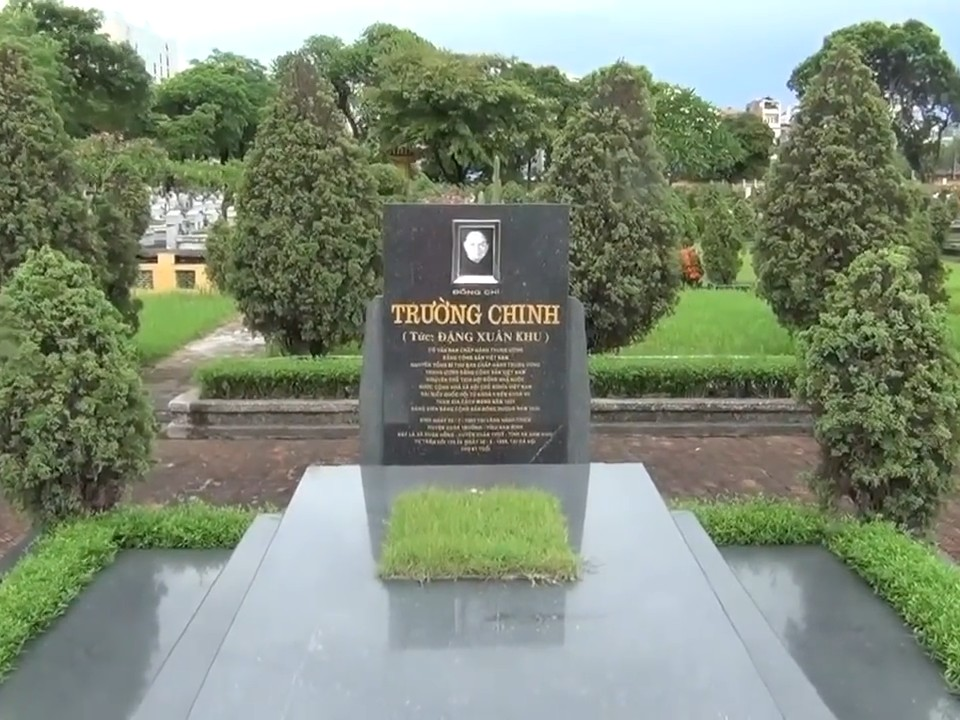
Trường Chinh's grave at Mai Dich Cemetery

He resigned as president in 1987 due to ill health, but continued to serve as advisor to the Central Committee of the Communist Party of Vietnam. He died on September 30, 1988, after falling down stairs, at the age of 81. His funeral was held at the Ba Đình Hall and he was buried at the Mai Dich Cemetery.

== Honours and awards ==
- Vietnam:
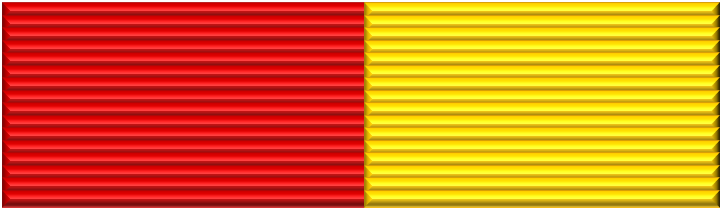
  - Gold Star Order
- Czechoslovakia:
  - Order of Klement Gottwald (20 February 1982)
- Soviet Union:
  - Order of Lenin (22 January 1982)
  - Order of the October Revolution (6 February 1987)
- Ukraine:
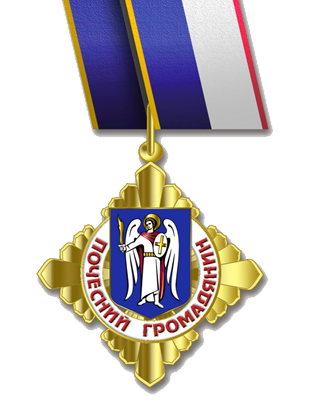
  - Honorary Citizen of Kyiv

On May 25, 2023, the Kyiv City Council decided to deprive Trường Chinh of this title, but the decision was not signed by the mayor of Kyiv, Vitali Klitschko, due to its inconsistency with the Law of Ukraine "On the condemnation of communist and national socialist (Nazi) totalitarian regimes in Ukraine and the prohibition of propaganda of their symbols". On June 15, 2023, the city council excluded from the draft decision of 25.05.2023 "On the deprivation of the title "Honorary Citizen of Kyiv" General Secretary of the Communist Party of Vietnam Trường Chinh. As of 2024, Trường Chinh was an honorary citizen of Kyiv.

== Works and publications ==
- 1938: The Peasant Question (Vấn đề dân cày) (Co-author with Võ Nguyên Giáp)
- 1943: Theses on Vietnam Culture (Đề cương văn hóa Việt Nam)
- 1946: The August Revolution (Cách mạng Tháng Tám)
- 1947: The Resistance Will Win (Kháng chiến nhất định thắng lợi)
- 1948: The Marxism and Vietnamese Culture (Chủ nghĩa Mác và vấn đề văn hóa Việt Nam)
- 1969: Forward Along The Path Charted By K. Marx

== Sources ==
- Bradley, Mark Philip. Imaging Vietnam and America: The Making of Post Colonial Vietnam, 1919–1950. Chapel Hill: University of North Carolina Press, 2000.
- Elliot, David W. P. Changing Worlds: Vietnam's Transition from the Cold War to Globalization. Oxford: Oxford University Press, 2012.
- Ninh, Kim Ngoc Bao. World Transformed: The Politics of Culture in Revolutionary Vietnam, 1945–1965. Ann Arbor: The University of Michigan Press, 2005.
- Nguyen, Lien-Hang T. Hanoi's War: An International History of the War for Peace in Vietnam. Chapel Hill: The University of North Carolina Press, 2012.
- Malarney, Shuan Kingsley. Culture, Ritual and Revolution in Vietnam. Honolulu: University of Hawaii Press, 2002.
- Marr, David G. Vietnam: State, War, and Revolution (1945-1946). Berkeley: University of California Press, 2013.
- Moise, Edwin E. Land Reform in China and North Vietnam: Consolidating the revolution at the village level. Chapel Hill: The University of North Carolina Press, 1983.
- Teodoru, Daniel E. “The Bloodbath Hypothesis: The Maoist Pattern in North Vietnam's Radical Land Reform,” in Southeast Asian Perspectives, No. 9 (Mar., 1973), pp. 1–78.
- Thai Quang Trung. Collective leadership and factionalism: an essay on Ho Chi Minh's legacy.Singapore: Institute of Southeast Asian Studies, 1985.
- Trần Nhâm. Trường Chinh: Một tư duy sáng tại, Một tài năng kiệt xuất. Hà Nội: NXB Chính trí Quốc gia, 2007.
- Trần Nhâm.Lê Duẩn – Trường Chinh: Hai nhà lý luận xuất sắc của các mạng Việt Nam. Hà Nội: NXB Chính trị Quốc gia, 2002.
- Tuong Vu. Vietnam's Communist Revolution: The Power and Limits of Ideology. New York: Cambridge University Press, 2017.
- Viện Nghiên cứu Hồ Chí Minh và các Lãnh tụ của Đảng. Trường-Chinh và Cách Mạng Việt Nam. Hà Nội: NXB Chính trị Quốc gia, 1997.
- Vo, Alex-Thai Do. “Preliminary Comments on Mobilizing the Masses, 1953” in Sojourn: Journal of Social Issues in Southeast Asia, Volume 31, Number 3, November 2016, pp. 983–1018.
- Zhai, Qiang. China and the Vietnam Wars, 1950–1975. Chapel Hill and London: The University of North Carolina Press, 2000.

Party political offices
Preceded by Lê Duẩn	General Secretary of the Communist Party of Vietnam; 1940–1956 and 1986	Succeeded by Nguyễn Văn Linh
Political offices
Preceded by Nguyễn Hữu Thọ	President of Vietnam; 1981–1987	Succeeded by Võ Chí Công
