= Phạm Văn Đồng =

Prime Minister of Vietnam from 1976 to 1987

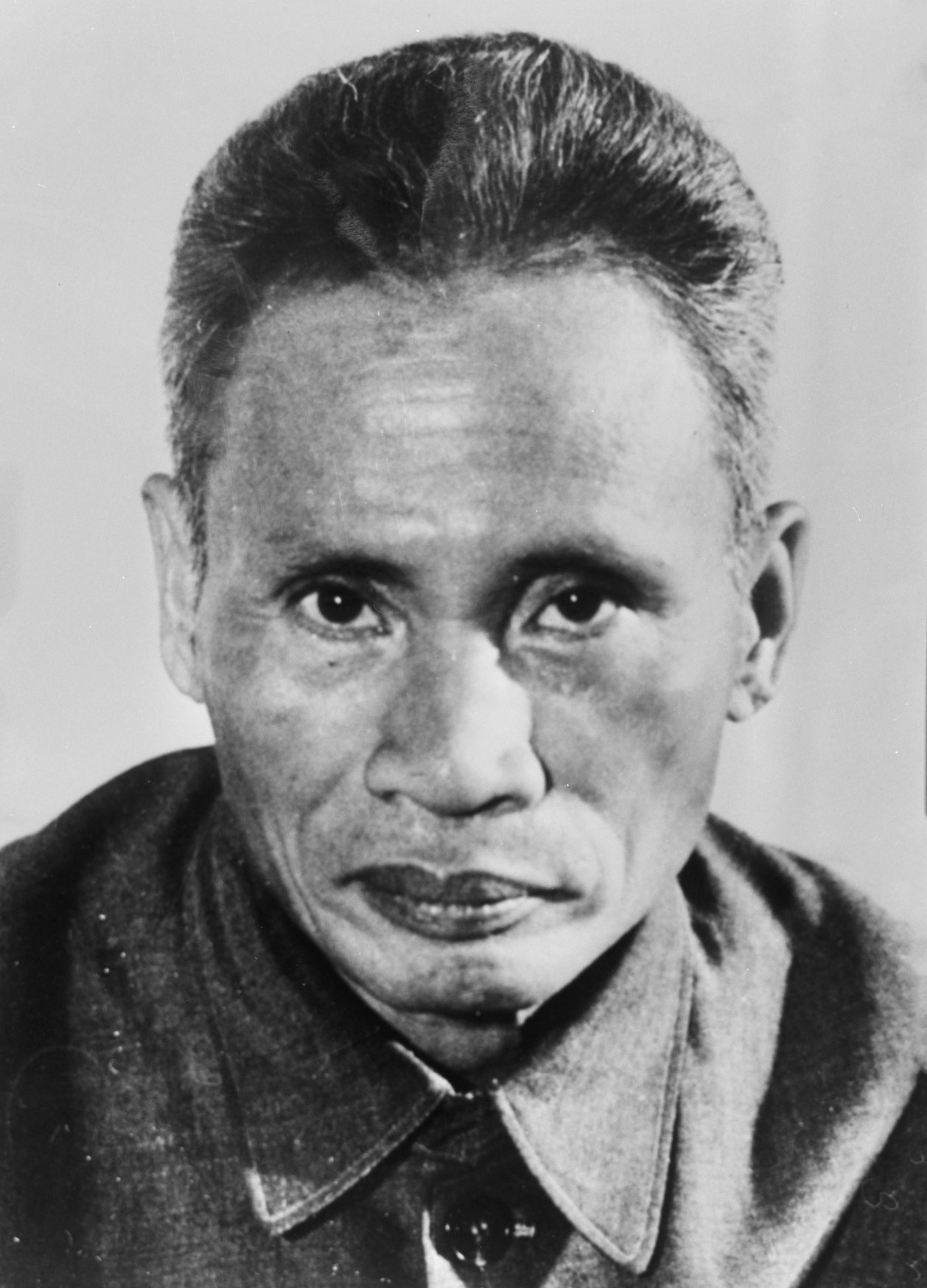
- Đồng in 1972

1st Prime Minister of Vietnam Chairman of the Council of Ministers
- In office 2 July 1976 – 18 June 1987
- Preceded by: Position established
- Succeeded by: Pham Hung

Prime Minister of North Vietnam
- In office 20 September 1955 – 2 July 1976
- President: Hồ Chí Minh; Tôn Đức Thắng
- Preceded by: Ho Chi Minh (de facto); Position established
- Succeeded by: Himself as Prime Minister of Vietnam

Deputy head of government of North Vietnam
- In office 25 June 1947 – 20 September 1955
- Prime Minister: Ho Chi Minh
- Succeeded by: Phan Kế Toại; Võ Nguyên Giáp

Member of the Politburo
- In office 1951–1987

Minister of Foreign Affairs
- In office April 1954 – February 1961
- Preceded by: Hoàng Minh Giám
- Succeeded by: Ung Văn Khiêm

Minister of Finance
- In office September 1945 – March 1946
- Preceded by: Position established
- Succeeded by: Lê Văn Hiến

Advisor to the Central Committee
- In office 18 December 1986 – 29 December 1997 Serving with Trường Chinh, Lê Đức Thọ, Nguyễn Văn Linh, Võ Chí Công
- Preceded by: Position established
- Succeeded by: Võ Văn Kiệt

Personal details
- Born: 1 March 1906 Mộ Đức, Quảng Ngãi province, Annam, French Indochina
- Died: 29 April 2000 (aged 94) Hanoi, Vietnam
- Party: CPV (1940–1997)
- Awards: Gold Star Order

- Vietnamese name
- Vietnamese: Phạm Văn Đồng
- Hán-Nôm: 范文同

Phạm Văn Đồng (Vietnamese: [fâːmˀ vɐ̄n ɗòŋ͡m]; 1 March 1906 – 29 April 2000) was a Vietnamese politician who served as Prime Minister of North Vietnam from 1955 to 1976. He later served as Prime Minister of Vietnam, following reunification of North and South Vietnam, from 1976 until he retired in 1987 under the presidency of Trường Chinh and Nguyễn Văn Linh. He was considered one of Ho Chi Minh's closest lieutenants.

Đồng is the longest-serving prime minister of Vietnam, serving over 30 years from 1955 to 1987, and a student and close associate of Ho Chi Minh. His nickname is To, which used to be his alias. He was also called Lam Ba Kiet when he worked as Deputy Director of the District Attorney's Office in Guilin (the director was Ho Hoc Lam).

== Early life ==
According to an official report, Đồng was born into a family of civil servants in Đức Tân village, Mộ Đức district, in Quảng Ngãi Province on the central coast on 1 March 1906. In 1925, at the age of 18, he joined fellow students to stage a school sit-in to mourn the death of the famous patriotic scholar Phan Chu Trinh.

About this time Đồng developed an interest in the Communist Party and in the unification and decolonization of Vietnam. In 1926, he traveled to Guangzhou in southern China to attend a training course run by Nguyen Ai Quoc (later known as Ho Chi Minh), before being admitted as a member of the Vietnamese Revolutionary Youth League, or Thanh Niên for short, the predecessor of the Communist Party of Vietnam (CPV).

In 1929, Đồng worked for Thanh Niên in Saigon. In the same year, he was arrested, tried by the French colonial authorities and sentenced to ten years in prison. He served the term in Poulo Condor Island Prison until 1936, when he was released under the general amnesty granted by the government of the Popular Front in France after its recent electoral successes.

== Revolutionary and Party career ==
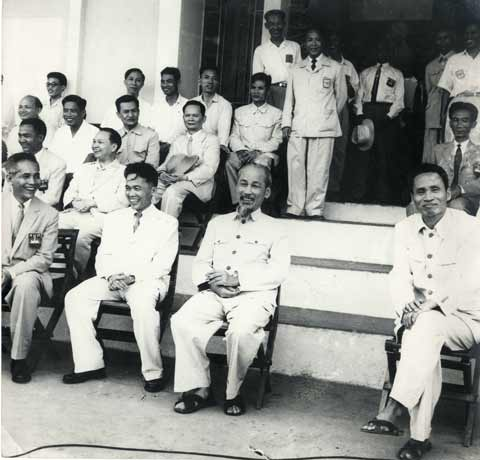
Phạm Văn Đồng (first row, far right) watches a football game with Hồ Chí Minh (front row, second from left) and Trường Chinh (second row, second from left) at Hàng Đẫy Stadium, Hanoi, 24 August 1958

In 1936, Đồng was released from prison and began operating in Hanoi. In 1940, he secretly went to China with Võ Nguyên Giáp, joined the Indochinese Communist Party, and was tasked by Ho Chi Minh to build a base at the Vietnam-China border.

Đồng joined the Indochinese Communist Party in 1940 and then continued to take part in activities led by Ho Chi Minh. In 1945, at the National People's Congress of Tân Trào, he was elected to the Standing Committee of five members of the National Committee for the Liberation, preparing for the August Revolution.

After Ho Chi Minh rose to power during the August Revolution in 1945, Đồng was appointed minister of finance of the newly established government of the Democratic Republic of Vietnam (DRV), a position he occupied until 1946.

Before he assumed the position of Minister of Finance, on May 31, 1946, Đồng was the head of the delegation of the Democratic Republic of Vietnam at Fontainebleau (France) instead of Nguyễn Tường Tam, who did not undertake the task, seeking an independent solution for Indochina. However, the conference failed because France did not set a definite deadline for the referendum in Cochinchina.

In 1947 Đồng was elected as alternate member of the Central Committee of Indochinese Communist Party (official commissioner since 1949). From July 1949, he was appointed Deputy Prime Minister.

In September 1954, Đồng became Minister of Foreign Affairs of the Democratic Republic of Vietnam, Head of Foreign Affairs of the Central Committee of the Party. At the 5th session of the DRV's First National Assembly convocation (1955), Dong was appointed the Prime Minister of the Socialist Republic of Vietnam and the Vice President of the National Defense Council until his retirement in 1987. He was a member of the National Assembly from 1946 to 1987.

== First Indochina War ==
Following the defeat of Japan, nationalist forces fought French colonial forces in the First Indochina War that lasted from 1945 to 1954. Phạm Văn Đồng was appointed the Special Envoy of the Central Committee in South Central Vietnam.

After the French suffered a major defeat at the Battle of Dien Bien Phu in 1954 peace talks began. In May 1954, Phạm Văn Đồng was appointed Head of the Government delegation to the Geneva Conference on Indochina. After intense negotiations a peace treaty was signed and the French forces withdrew from direct conflict with the newly independent North Vietnam, while providing for what was originally envisioned as the temporary division of North and South Vietnam, and recognizing the independence of Cambodia and Laos. He signed the peace accords with French Premier Pierre Mendès France.

== Second Indochinese War ==
Ho Chi Minh had suffered several strokes in the early 1960s, causing him to largely retire from the day-to-day management of North Vietnam. Owing to Ho's absence, Đồng became the face of North Vietnam during the war with the United States, as he was the one who usually spoke to foreign diplomats and journalists. He was known to have close links with the Chinese government, which helped fund the conflict with South Vietnam and economic development of North Vietnam. He was also one of the figures involved in peace talks to end the conflict under the administrations of Lyndon B. Johnson and Richard Nixon.

In 1963, Đồng played a part in the "Maneli affair", named after Mieczysław Maneli, the Polish commissioner to the International Control Commission. In May 1963 Đồng told Maneli he was interested in his peace plan calling for a federation of the two Vietnams, saying that just as long as the American advisers left South Vietnam "we can come to an agreement with any Vietnamese". Reflecting the problems imposed by the drought in North Vietnam, Đồng told Maneli that he was willing to accept a ceasefire which would be followed up by a barter trade with coal from North Vietnam being exchanged for rice from South Vietnam. That proposal ultimately went nowhere in the face of resistance from both the government of South Vietnam and the United States and opposition by North Vietnam's allies.

In 1964–65, Đồng was involved in the so-called "Seaborn Mission", meeting with the diplomat J. Blair Seaborn, who served as the Canadian Commissioner to the International Control Commission. On 8 June 1964, Đồng met Seaborn in Hanoi. Seaborn had an offer from President Johnson promising billions of American economic aid and diplomatic recognition of North Vietnam in exchange for North Vietnam ending its attempts to overthrow the government of South Vietnam. Seaborn also warned that Johnson had told him that he was considering a strategic bombing campaign against North Vietnam if his offer was rejected. Đồng told Seaborn that the American terms were unacceptable, as he demanded the end of American assistance to South Vietnam; South Vietnam to become neutral in the Cold War; and for the National Liberation Front, better known as the Viet Cong, to take part in a coalition government in Saigon.

== Later life ==
In general, Phạm Văn Đồng was considered a staunch communist and a great nationalist leader, one of the most faithful disciples of Ho Chi Minh and a major figure in Vietnam's fight for independence and unity. He tried to maintain a neutral position in the various conflicts within the party, particularly after the establishment of the Vietnamese Socialist Republic in 1976.

From 12 to 17 October 1978 Đồng visited Malaysia. Here he pledged Vietnam would not interfere in the internal affairs of other nations and laid a wreath at the National Monument.

Although retired from public office, Đồng served as a Counselor to the Party Central Committee from December 1986 to 1997. He often urged the party to make greater efforts to stop corruption, which is still a widespread problem in Vietnam today. He gave advice on similar issues, even after his term as an adviser to the Central Committee had ended.

As he became older, his vision deteriorated, and he was blind for the last 10 years of his life. After several months of illness, Đồng died in Hanoi on 29 April 2000, at the age of 94. His death was announced by the Vietnamese Communist Party and the Vietnamese government three days later on 2 May. Commemoration and funeral services were held on 6 May 2000, in Hanoi.

== Books and articles ==
- Karnow, Stanley Vietnam: A History, New York: Viking, 1983, ISBN 0670746045.
- Miller, Edward Misalliance: Ngo Dinh Diem, the United States, and the Fate of South Vietnam, Cambridge: Harvard University Press, 2013, ISBN 0674072987

Preceded by Ho Chi Minh	Prime Minister of North Vietnam; 1955–1976	Succeeded by Himself as Prime Minister of Vietnam
Preceded by Vũ Văn Mẫu – Prime Minister of South Vietnam and Nguyễn Hữu Thọ – Provisional Revolutionary Government of the Republic of South Vietnam and himself as Prime Minister of North Vietnam	Prime Minister of Vietnam 1976–87	Succeeded by Phạm Hùng
