= Tân Lộc =

Tân Lộc may refer to several places in Vietnam, including:

- Tân Lộc, Cần Thơ, a ward of Thốt Nốt district
- Tân Lộc, Hà Tĩnh, a commune of Lộc Hà district
- Tân Lộc, Vĩnh Long, a commune of Tam Bình district
- Tân Lộc, Cà Mau, a commune of Thới Bình district

== See also ==
- The communes of Tân Lộc Bắc and Tân Lộc Đông in Thới Bình district, Cà Mau province
