= U Minh (disambiguation) =

U Minh is a commune of Cà Mau province, Vietnam.

U Minh may also refer to:

== Administrative divisions ==
- U Minh Thượng district, a former district in Kiên Giang province
- U Minh district, a former district in Cà Mau province

== National parks ==
- U Minh Thượng National Park, a national park located in An Giang province
- U Minh Hạ National Park, a national park located in Cà Mau province
