= Viktor Maslov (mathematician) =

Russian physicist and mathematician (1930–2023)

- Виктор Маслов
- Born: Viktor Pavlovich Maslov; 15 June 1930; Moscow, Russian SFSR, USSR
- Died: 3 August 2023 (aged 93)
- Citizenship: Russian
- Education: Lomonosov Moscow State University
- Known for: Maslov index
- Spouse(s): Lê Vũ Anh (m. 1975; died 1981) Irina
- Children: 3
- Awards: State Prize of the USSR (1978); A.M.Lyapunov Gold Medal (USSR Academy of Science, 1982); Lenin Prize (1985); State Prize of the Russian Federation (1997); Demidov prize (2000); Independent Russian Triumph Prize (2002); State Prize of the Russian Federation (2013)
- Scientific career
- Fields: physico-mathematics
- Workplaces: Lomonosov Moscow State University
- Doctoral advisor: Sergei Fomin

Viktor Pavlovich Maslov (Russian: Виктор Павлович Маслов; 15 June 1930 – 3 August 2023) was a Russian mathematical physicist. He was a member of the Russian Academy of Sciences. He obtained his doctorate in physico-mathematical sciences in 1957. His main fields of interest were quantum theory, idempotent analysis, non-commutative analysis, superfluidity, superconductivity, and phase transitions. He was editor-in-chief of Mathematical Notes and Russian Journal of Mathematical Physics.

The Maslov index is named after him. He also introduced the concept of Lagrangian submanifold.

== Early life and career ==
Viktor Pavlovich Maslov was born in Moscow on 15 June 1930. He was the son of statistician Pavel Maslov and researcher Izolda Lukomskaya, and the grandson of the economist and agriculturalist Petr Maslov. At the beginning of World War II, he was evacuated to Kazan with his mother, grandmother and other members of his mother's family.

In 1953 he graduated from the Physics Department of the Moscow State University and taught at the university. In 1957 he defended his Ph.D. thesis and in 1966, his doctoral dissertation. In 1984, he was elected an academician within Department of Mathematics of the Academy of Sciences of the USSR.

From 1968 to 1998, he headed the Department of Applied Mathematics at the Moscow Institute of Electronics and Mathematics. From 1992 to 2016, he was in charge of the Department of Quantum Statistics and Field Theory of the Physics Faculty of Moscow State University.

Maslov headed the laboratory of the mechanics of natural disasters at the Institute for Problems in Mechanics of the Russian Academy of Sciences. He was a research professor at the Department of Applied Mathematics at Moscow Institute of Electronics and Mathematics of Higher School of Economics.

== Scientific activity ==
Maslov was known as a prominent specialist in the field of mathematical physics, differential equations, functional analysis, mechanics and quantum physics. He developed asymptotic methods that are widely applied to equations arising in quantum mechanics, field theory, statistical physics and abstract mathematics, that bear his name.

Maslov's asymptotic methods are closely related to such problems as the theory of a self-consistent field in quantum and classical statistics, superfluidity and superconductivity, quantization of solitons, quantum field theory in strong external fields and in curved space-time, the method of expansion in the inverse number of particle types. In 1983, he attended the International Congress of Mathematicians in Warsaw, where he presented a plenary report "Non-standard characteristics of asymptotic problems".

Maslov dealt with the problems of liquid and gas, carried out fundamental research on the problems of magnetohydrodynamics related to the dynamo problem. He also made calculations for the emergency unit of the Chernobyl nuclear power plant during the 1986 disaster. In 1991, he made model and forecasts of the economic situation in Russia.

From the early 1990s, he worked on the use of equations of mathematical physics in economics and financial analysis. In particular, he managed to predict the 1998 Russian financial crisis, and even earlier, the collapse of the economic and, as a consequence, the collapse of the political system of the USSR.

In 2008, Maslov in his own words predicted a global recession in the late 2000s. He calculated the critical number of U.S. debt, and found out that a crisis should break out in the near future. In the calculations, he used equations similar to the equations of phase transition in physics. In the mid-1980s, Maslov introduced the term tropical mathematics, in which the operations of the conditional optimization problem were considered.

== Personal life ==
In the early 1970s, he met Lê Vũ Anh, the daughter of Lê Duẩn, then General Secretary of the Communist Party of Vietnam, when she was a student at the Faculty of Physics in Moscow State University. The romance was considered scandalous because Vietnamese students studying abroad were not allowed to have romantic relationships with foreigners and anyone caught would have to be disciplined and may be sent back to Vietnam. In order to avoid trouble, she returned home to marry a Vietnamese student from the same university and wanted to stay in Vietnam to forget her love affair with Maslov. However, she was forced by her father to return to USSR to complete her studies.

When she and her husband returned to Moscow, Anh realized that she did not love her husband and could not forget her former lover. She decided to live separately from her husband and secretly went back and forth with Maslov. After being pregnant for the second time, after having a miscarriage for the first time, Anh had enough energy to ask her husband for a divorce in order to be able to marry Maslov. In 1975, she and Maslov married. She gave birth to a daughter on 31 October 1977 named Lena. Meeting her father by chance when he went to USSR for a state visit, Anh confessed all her love affairs. Lê Duẩn did not accept it and tried to lure her back to the country. However, Anh gradually reconciled with her family. Le Kien Thanh, Anh's brother, wrote that most of their family did genuinely like Maslov, who was regarded as a "genius scientist with a super intelligence", but also regarded him as "crazy" with his eccentric behavior and unorthodox beliefs.

After giving birth to her second daughter Tania, Anh gave birth to her son, Anton, on 1981. Anh died shortly after giving birth to her son, due to hemorrhage.

Immediately after Anh's death, a dispute arose over the custody of his three children, driven largely by the objections of their grandmother, Nguyen Thuy Nga. She strongly disapproved of Maslov's eccentric parenting style—particularly his refusal to enroll the children in formal schools, instead allowing them to roam the suburbs freely and receive an unconventional education from university lecturers he invited at irregular hours. His behavior also drew political ire; notably, he irritated Le Duan by illustrating to his other children and visiting relatives, through mathematical models, why he believed the Soviet Union was destined to collapse. An official from the Vietnamese Communist Party's Central Committee took over the communication between Maslov and Anh's family. Both sides proposed a compromise solution, Maslov kept his daughters and son would be returned to Lê Duẩn. Maslov only allowed his son to go to Vietnam for two years. But after the deadline, his son never returned to him. Maslov had to fight for two more years before Lê Duẩn accepted to bring his grandson to meet his father.

However, the son that Maslov met was no longer Anton Maslov as before, but a Vietnamese citizen with the new name Nguyễn An Hoàn and he was unable to speak Russian. According to Maslov, Lê Duẩn did not intend to return the child, but also hoped to bring back his daughters. Fearing the loss of his children, Maslov contacted the son of the President of the Supreme Soviet of the Soviet Union Andrei Gromyko, a close friend of Soviet leader Mikhail Gorbachev. He was advised to write to Gorbachev and was promised to convince Gorbachev to read it. After a massive legal struggle, Lê Duẩn gave up the idea of taking him and his children back. However, Nguyen Thuy Nga only relented after Maslov agreed to allow his children to attend school and have a more conventional childhood.

His children later resided in England and the Netherlands, where they were highly successful in their respective professions.

Maslov later remarried a woman named Irina, who was at the same age as his first wife Anh. Irina is a linguist and she received the title of Associate Doctor of Science in 1991. For the last three decades, he lived in Troitsk.

Viktor Maslov died on 3 August 2023, at the age of 93.

== Selected books ==
- Maslov, V. P. (1972). Théorie des perturbations et méthodes asymptotiques. Dunod; 384 pages
- Karasëv, M. V.; Maslov, V. P.: Nonlinear Poisson brackets. Geometry and quantization. Translated from the Russian by A. Sossinsky [A. B. Sosinskiĭ] and M. Shishkova. Translations of Mathematical Monographs, 119. American Mathematical Society, Providence, RI, 1993.
- Kolokoltsov, Vassili N.; Maslov, Victor P.: Idempotent analysis and its applications. Translation of Idempotent analysis and its application in optimal control (Russian), "Nauka" Moscow, 1994. Translated by V. E. Nazaikinskii. With an appendix by Pierre Del Moral. Mathematics and its Applications, 401. Kluwer Academic Publishers Group, Dordrecht, 1997.
- Maslov, V. P.; Fedoriuk, M. V.: Semi-classical approximation in quantum mechanics. Translated from the Russian by J. Niederle and J. Tolar. Mathematical Physics and Applied Mathematics, 7. Contemporary Mathematics, 5. D. Reidel Publishing Co., Dordrecht-Boston, Mass., 1981.

This book was cited over 700 times at Google Scholar in 2011.

- Maslov, V. P. Operational methods. Translated from the Russian by V. Golo, N. Kulman and G. Voropaeva. Mir Publishers, Moscow, 1976.
