= Khánh An (disambiguation) =

Khánh An may refer to:

- Khánh An, Cà Mau, a rural commune of Cà Mau province
- Khánh An, An Giang, a former rural commune of An Phú District
- Khánh An, Ninh Bình, a former rural commune of Yên Khánh District
