= Cà Mau (city) =

- Provincial city (Class-2)
- Cà Mau City; Thành phố Cà Mau
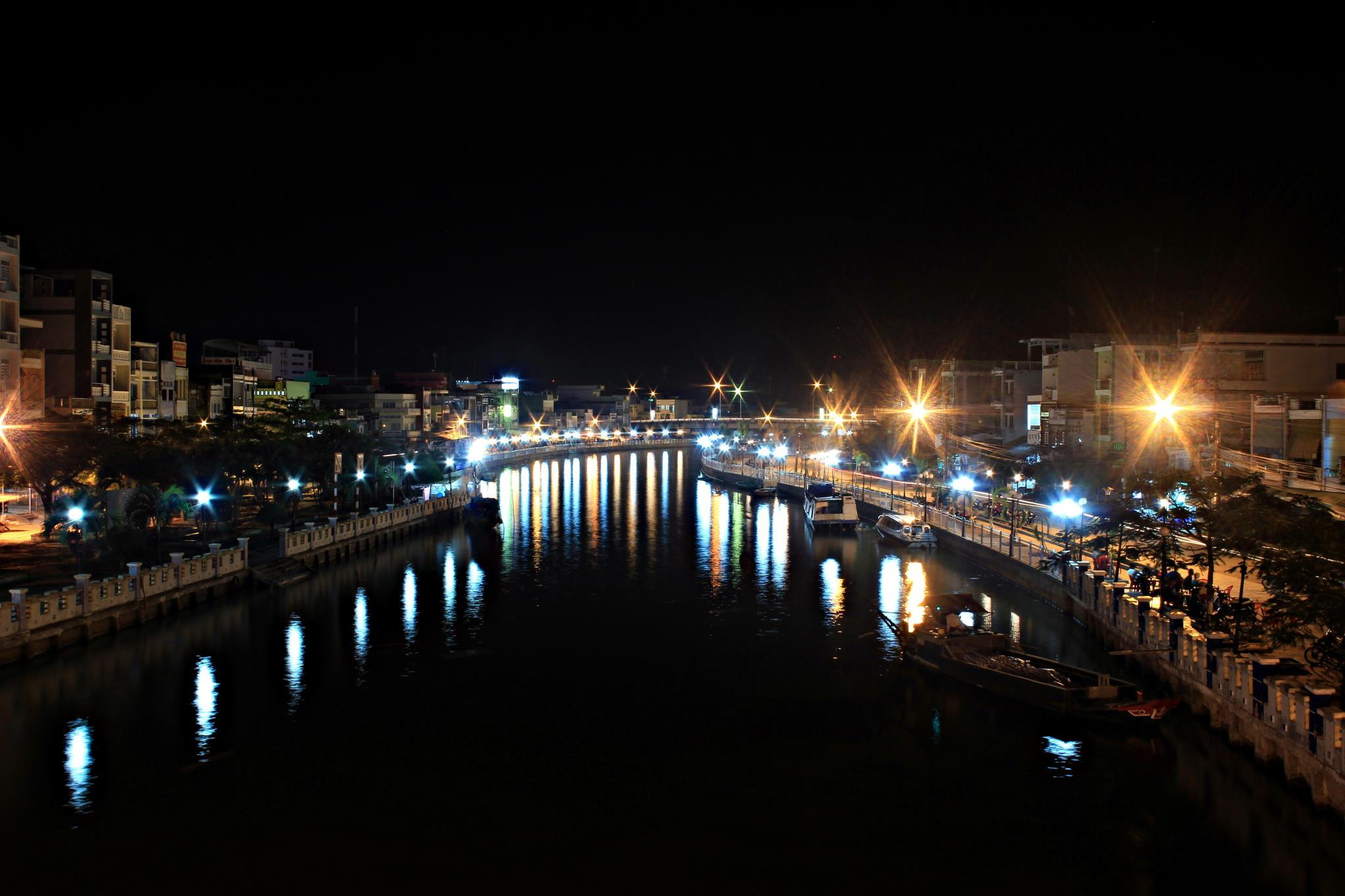

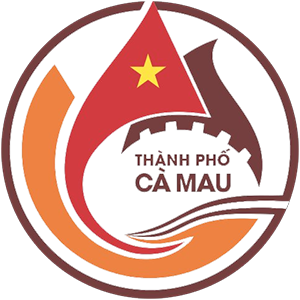
- Seal
- Interactive map of Cà Mau
- Location of in Vietnam
- Coordinates: 9°11′N 105°9′E
- Country: Vietnam
- Province: Cà Mau

Area
  - Land: 250.3 km^{2} (96.6 sq mi)

Population (2019 census)
  - Provincial city (Class-2): 226,372
  - Density: 904.4/km^{2} (2,342/sq mi)
  - Urban: 143,341
  - Rural: 83,031
- Time zone: UTC+07:00 (Indochina Time)
- Climate: Am
- Website: Tỉnh Cà Mau

Cà Mau is a former provincial city in southern Vietnam. It was the capital of Cà Mau province, a province in the Mekong Delta region, in the southernmost part of Vietnam's inland territory (mainland). The city is characterised by its system of transport canals, and most goods are transported there by boats and barges.

The population is approximately 226,372 as of 2019. Cà Mau is accessible by road (360 km south-west of Ho Chi Minh City) via National Route 1 or by air (Cà Mau Airport). The city was administratively subdivided into eight urban phường (ward) and seven rural xã (commune).

== Economy ==
Cà Mau is Vietnam's biggest exporter of shrimp and prawns. In 2005, Cà Mau province alone exported about $500 million of shrimp and prawns. A large petroleum project under construction, the Cà Mau Gas-Power-Fertilizer Complex, is valued at $1.4 billion. It includes:

- 2 thermal power plants with a total capacity of 1500 MW (equipment provided by the German company Siemens)
- A fertilizer plant with production capacity at 800,000 metric tonnes of urea/year, and
- A gas pipeline 18 inches in diameter to extend 298 km offshore and with 27 km onshore piping in gas from the PM3 gas field shared with Malaysia. Two billion cubic metres of gas are piped to feed these plants per year.

The project opened in December 2008.

== Tourism ==
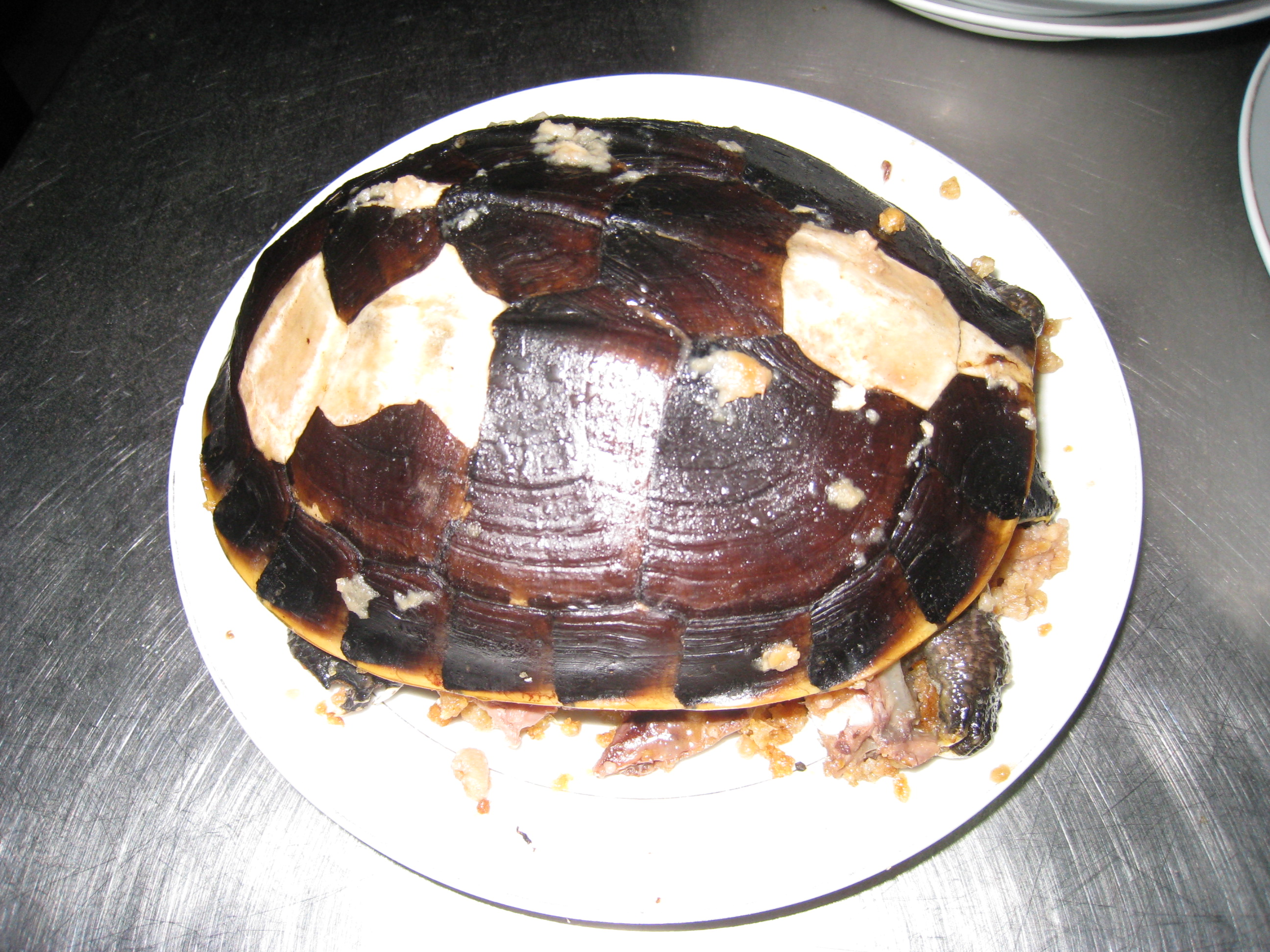
Turtle meat is a common cuisine of Cà Mau

Cà Mau has several attractions that draw domestic and international tourists. These include several wild bird parks, the southernmost point in Vietnam (called Mũi Cà Mau), and a number of pagodas. Near Cà Mau is the U Minh area with its famous mangrove forest and swamp cuisine: fish hot pots, Vietnamese, Chinese, and Khmer cuisines. Cà Mau also has several 1- to 3-star hotel restaurants.

== History ==
During the 1st millennium, the region of the present Cà Mau province was part of the Kingdom of Funan (Vietnamese: Phù Nam), which included Laos, Cambodia, parts of eastern Thailand, and southern Vietnam (Vietnamese: Nam Bộ). This region was later conquered by the kingdom of Chenla (Vietnamese: Chân Lạp) and the Khmer Empire. In 1757, the land belonging to Cà Mau province (Khmer: ទឹកខ្មៅ, "the black land") was ceded by the Khmer king to the Nguyễn lord of Đàng Trong (central Vietnam) with an early settlement of Vietnamese people. During French rule, Cà Mau was only a small town. During the Republic of Vietnam, the area nearby Cà Mau was a stronghold (Vietnamese: Chiến khu cách mạng) for the Việt Cộng, a Hanoi-backed guerrilla group fighting the United States Army and the South Vietnamese government during the Vietnam War. After 1975, Cà Mau was made the administrative seat and the governmental center of Minh Hải province, which included Cà Mau and Bạc Liêu province. In 1995, Cà Mau province broke off from Minh Hải province with Cà Mau as its capital. In 1999, the prime minister by a decree recognised Cà Mau as a borough (Vietnamese: Thị xã) – Cà Mau Borough (3rd class urban area as per Vietnamese law). In 2010, the Prime Minister further upgraded City of Cà Mau to a 2nd class urban area.

== Transportation ==
Cà Mau is served by Cà Mau Airport.

== Demographics ==
The majority of its residents is ethnic Vietnamese, in addition to 300 Khmer Krom households and 400 Hoa households.

== Climate ==
Cà Mau has a tropical monsoon climate with a lengthy wet season and a relatively brief dry season. The wet season lasts from April to December, and the greatest rainfall occurs in August with 366 millimetres or 14.4 inches. The dry season lasts from January to March, the driest month being February with an average of 12 millimetres or 0.5 inches. Temperatures are high year round, but rise noticeably before the arrival of the monsoons in April.

Climate data for Cà Mau
Month	Jan	Feb	Mar	Apr	May	Jun	Jul	Aug	Sep	Oct	Nov	Dec	Year
Record high °C (°F)	35.2 (95.4)	36.2 (97.2)	36.8 (98.2)	38.3 (100.9)	38.2 (100.8)	35.9 (96.6)	34.7 (94.5)	34.6 (94.3)	35.2 (95.4)	34.8 (94.6)	33.8 (92.8)	33.5 (92.3)	38.3 (100.9)
Mean daily maximum °C (°F)	30.7 (87.3)	31.4 (88.5)	32.4 (90.3)	33.4 (92.1)	32.8 (91.0)	31.7 (89.1)	31.2 (88.2)	31.0 (87.8)	30.8 (87.4)	30.8 (87.4)	30.7 (87.3)	30.2 (86.4)	31.4 (88.5)
Daily mean °C (°F)	25.6 (78.1)	26.2 (79.2)	27.3 (81.1)	28.5 (83.3)	28.2 (82.8)	27.7 (81.9)	27.4 (81.3)	27.3 (81.1)	27.2 (81.0)	27.0 (80.6)	26.8 (80.2)	26.0 (78.8)	27.1 (80.8)
Mean daily minimum °C (°F)	22.7 (72.9)	22.9 (73.2)	23.8 (74.8)	24.8 (76.6)	25.3 (77.5)	25.0 (77.0)	24.8 (76.6)	24.8 (76.6)	24.8 (76.6)	24.8 (76.6)	24.5 (76.1)	23.4 (74.1)	24.3 (75.7)
Record low °C (°F)	15.3 (59.5)	16.9 (62.4)	18.1 (64.6)	19.0 (66.2)	21.9 (71.4)	21.1 (70.0)	21.2 (70.2)	21.3 (70.3)	21.7 (71.1)	21.4 (70.5)	19.7 (67.5)	16.8 (62.2)	15.3 (59.5)
Average rainfall mm (inches)	20.6 (0.81)	12.7 (0.50)	31.7 (1.25)	100.9 (3.97)	248.9 (9.80)	322.5 (12.70)	433.1 (17.05)	348.2 (13.71)	357.2 (14.06)	356.7 (14.04)	194.8 (7.67)	63.0 (2.48)	2,394 (94.25)
Average rainy days	3.8	1.6	2.9	6.9	17.8	20.8	22.2	22.2	22.2	22.5	16.2	8.6	165.9
Average relative humidity (%)	79.8	78.8	78.0	78.2	82.9	85.4	85.9	86.4	86.7	86.9	85.1	81.7	83.0
Mean monthly sunshine hours	220.6	228.3	256.4	230.3	173.7	142.3	153.0	148.9	136.6	146.2	171.4	187.0	2,185.8
Source: Vietnam Institute for Building Science and Technology

== People from Cà Mau ==
- Nguyễn Tấn Dũng – Prime Minister of Vietnam from 2006 to 2016.

== Gallery ==
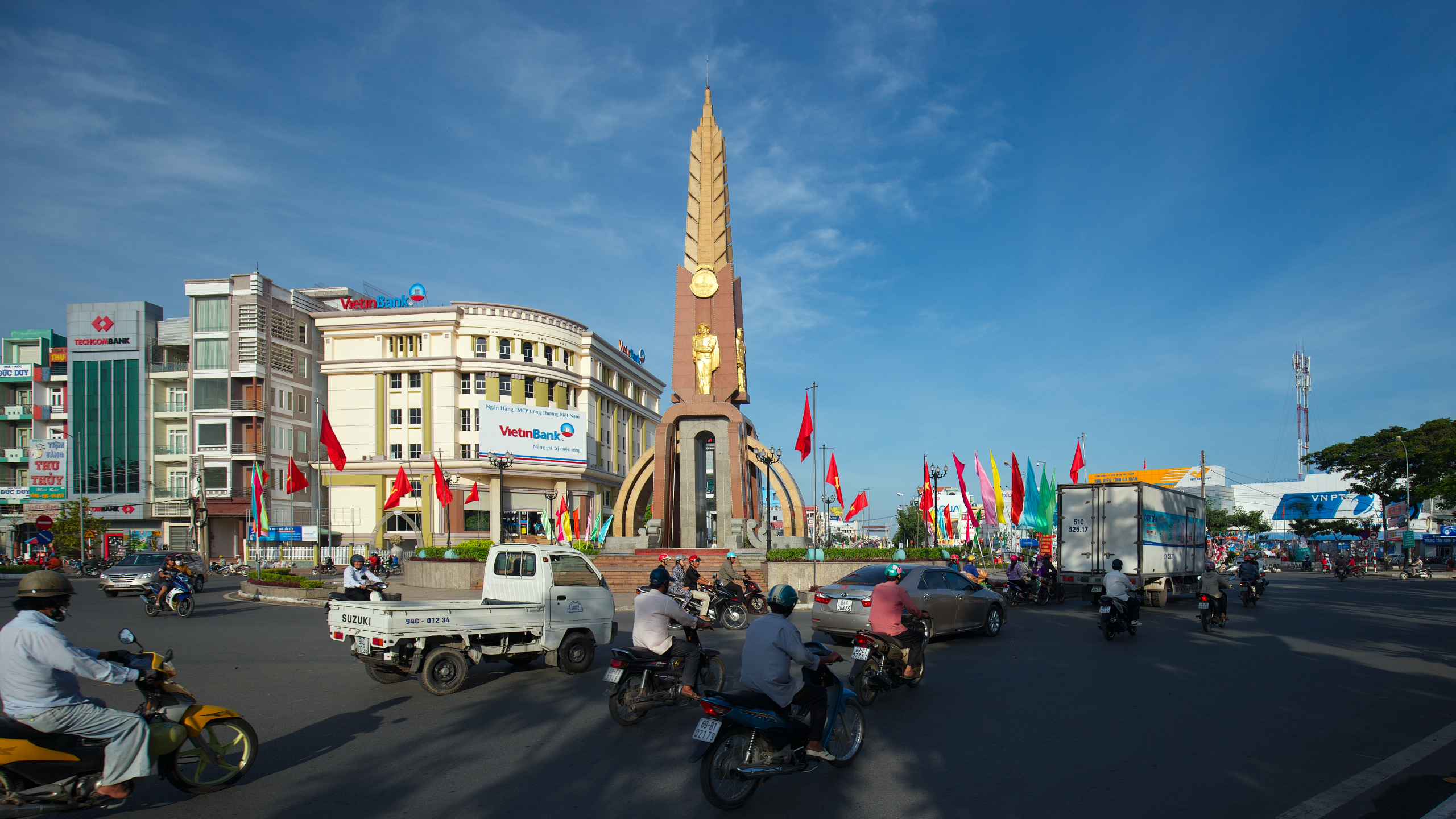
The Monument in downtown Cà Mau City, surrounded with the Provincial Administrative Hall, the Central Post Office and several banks

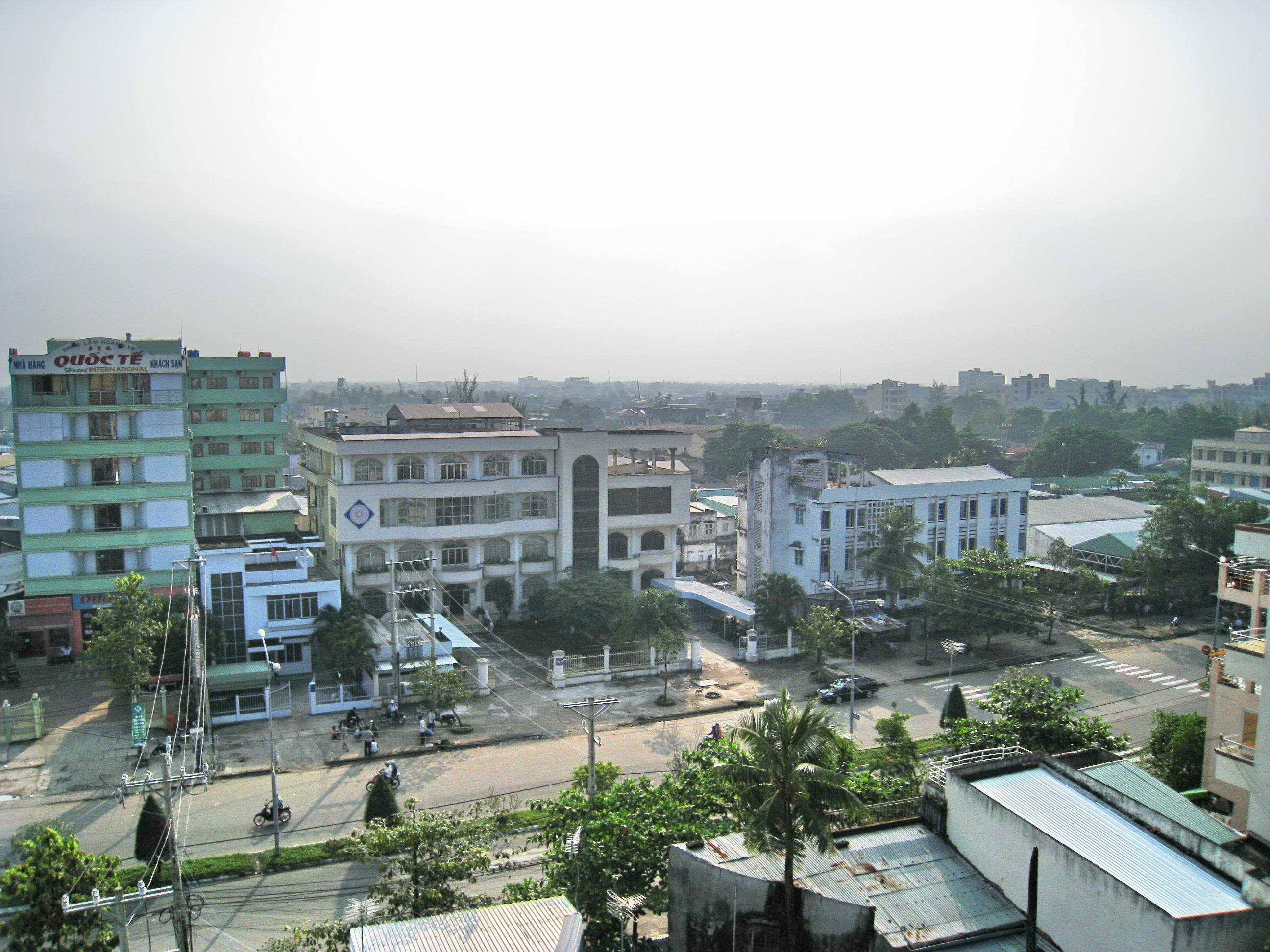
Phan Ngọc Hiển street in Cà Mau Central

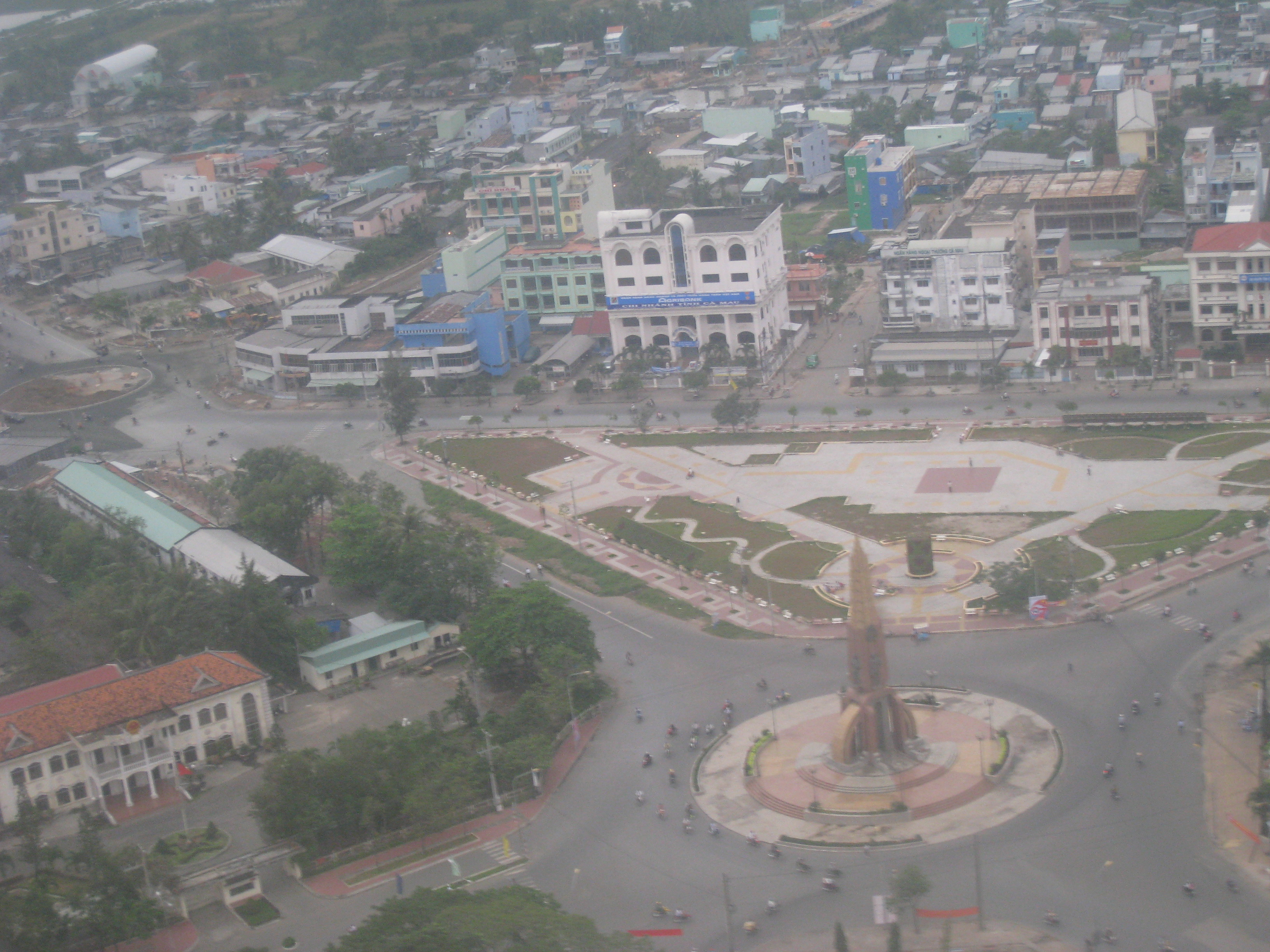
Cà Mau city downtown viewed from the air

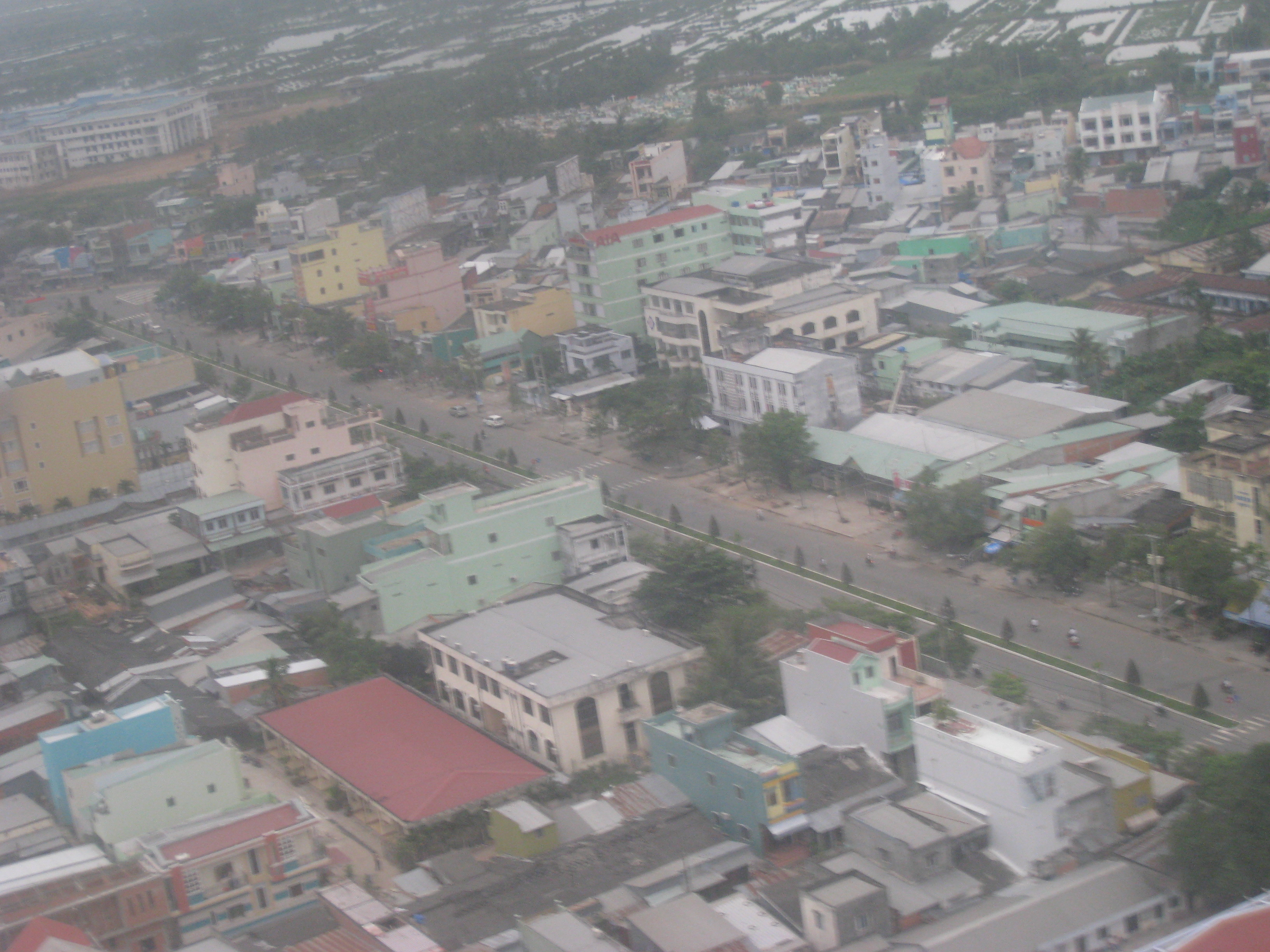
A main street in Cà Mau city

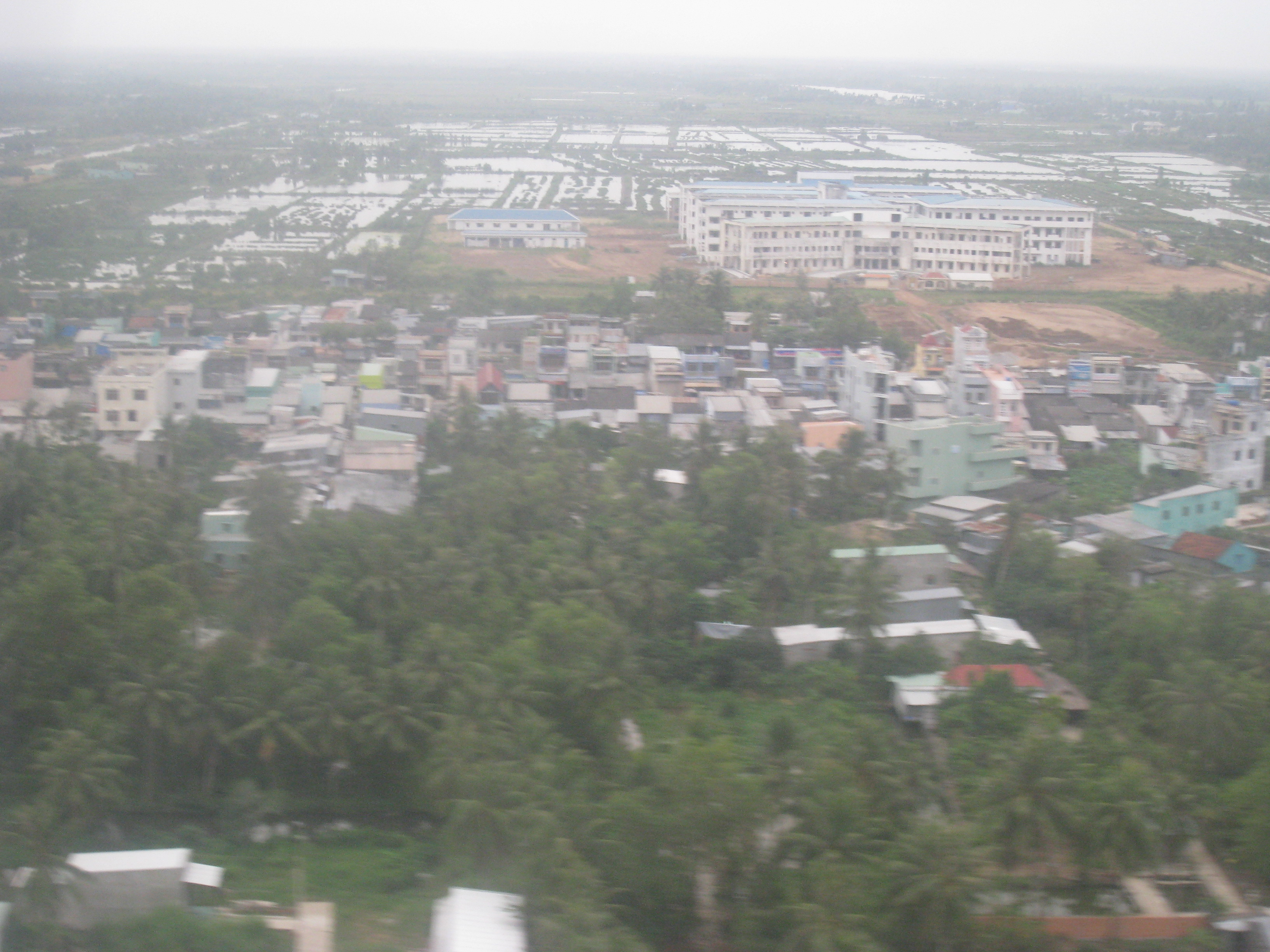
Cà Mau city
