= Cà Mau Gas-Power-Fertilizer Complex =

Power station complex in Vietnam

Coordinates: 9.236°N 105.063°E

Cà Mau Gas-Power-Fertilizer Complex (Vietnamese: Dự án Khí – Điện – Đạm Cà Mau) is one of the three economic projects carried out in the 2000-2005 period

== Planning ==
The plan includes a complex of gas pipeline, urea plant, thermal power plant in commune of Khánh An, U Minh district, Cà Mau province, southern Vietnam. The project is located by the junction of two rivers, near to Lower U Minh National Park, a low wetland area.

Along with the Cần Thơ Bridge it is one of the largest projects in the Mekong Delta.

The complex was invested by Petrovietnam and includes two thermal gas-fuelled power plants (total capacity of 1,500 MW, main equipment supplied by Siemens), an 18-inch-wide (460 mm) and 330-kilometre-long (210 mi) gas pipeline, a urea plant (800,000 metric tons per annum). The 18-inch pipeline originates in PM3 gas field in the overlapping area between Malaysia and Vietnam and runs on the seabed 298 kilometers, gets landfall at Mui Tram, runs onshore 27 km to the complex. Natural gas transported through this pipeline is fed to the power plants and fertilizer plants. Total designed transportation capacity of this pipeline reaches 2 billion cubic meters per annum. The construction of this pipeline achieved completion in February 2007. Both power plants were put into operation on 27 December 2008. The contractor of the pipeline was Vietsovpetro, of the power plants was LILAMA, main equipment of power plant was supplied by Siemens.

== Production ==
The Gas Processing Plant (GPP Cà Mau) is the final piece in the completion of Cà Mau Gas-Power-Fertilizer Complex project. GPP Ca Mau has a designed capacity of 6.2 million cubic meters of gas per day (equivalent to about 2 billion cubic meters annually), producing 600 tons of LPG and 34 tons of condensate daily.

On 5th June 2025, the plant reached 1 million tons of LPG milestone.

== Reception ==
Chairman of the National Assembly, Nguyễn Thị Kim stated that Cà Mau Gas-Power-Fertilizer Complex project is a "model" of Petrovietnam.
