= Mathematical Notes =

- Discipline: Mathematics
- Language: English
- Edited by: Victor P. Maslov

Publication details
- Former name: Mathematical Notes of the Academy of Sciences of the USSR
- History: 1967–present
- Publisher: Springer Science+Business Media on behalf of the Russian Academy of Sciences (Russia)
- Frequency: Monthly
- Open access: Yes
- Impact factor: 0.295 (2011)

Standard abbreviations
- ISO 4: Math. Notes

Indexing
- ISSN: 0001-4346 (print); 1573-8876 (web)
- LCCN: sn92025928
- OCLC no.: 754641284

Links
- Journal homepage

Mathematical Notes is a peer-reviewed mathematical journal published by Springer Science+Business Media on behalf of the Russian Academy of Sciences that covers all aspects of mathematics. It is an English language translation of the Russian-language journal Matematicheskie Zametki (Russian: Математические заметки) and is published simultaneously with the Russian version.

The journal was established in 1967 as Mathematical Notes of the Academy of Sciences of the USSR and obtained its current title in 1991. The current editor-in-chief is Victor P. Maslov. According to the Journal Citation Reports, the journal has a 2011 impact factor of 0.295.

The journal is indexed in Russian Science Citation Index.
