= Khánh An, Cà Mau =

Khánh An
- Commune
- Location in Vietnam
- Coordinates: 9°25′N 105°5′E
- Country: Vietnam
- Province: Cà Mau
- District: U Minh

Area
  - Total: 60.22 sq mi (155.98 km^{2})

Population (2008)
  - Total: 14,017
- Time zone: UTC+07:00

Khánh An is a commune (xã) in U Minh District, Cà Mau province, southern Vietnam. The commune is 14 km by road northwest of the provincial capital, Cà Mau. The commune has an area of 155.98 km2, population 14,017 inhabitants (2008). The commune contains 10 villages (ap). The commune is adjacent to Lower U Minh National Park, a low wetland area. Cà Mau Gas-Power-Fertilizer Complex invested by Petrovietnam with two thermal gas-fuelled power plants (total capacity of 1,500 MW, main equipment supplied by Siemens), an 18-inch-wide (460 mm) and 330-kilometre-long (210 mi) gas pipeline, a urea plant (800,000 metric tons per annum) is located here.
