= Lê Duẩn =

General Secretary of the Communist Party of Vietnam (1907–1986)

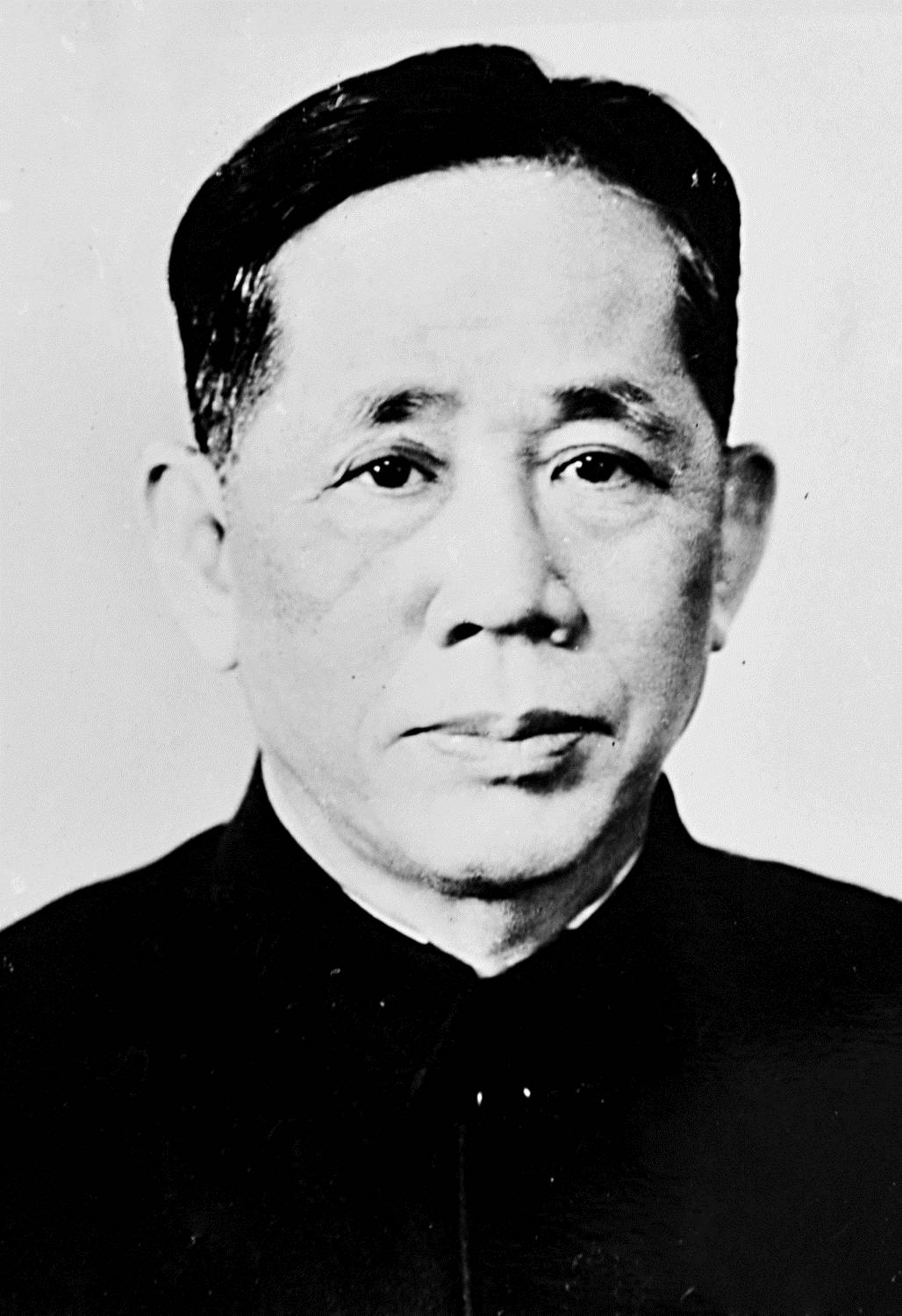
- Official portrait, 1978

General Secretary of the Communist Party of Vietnam (Note: From 1960 to 1976, Lê Duẩn initially held office as First Secretary of the Vietnam Workers' Party. After Vietnam's unification in 1976, this title was changed to General Secretary of the Communist Party of Vietnam.)
- In office 10 September 1960 – 10 July 1986
- Preceded by: Hồ Chí Minh
- Succeeded by: Trường Chinh

Secretary of the Central Military Commission of the Communist Party
- In office 1977–1984
- Preceded by: Võ Nguyên Giáp
- Succeeded by: Văn Tiến Dũng

Member of the Politburo
- In office 1951 – 10 July 1986

Member of the Secretariat
- In office 1951 – 10 July 1986

Secretary of the Party Committee in Cochinchina
- In office 1946–1954

Personal details
- Born: Lê Văn Nhuận; 7 April 1907 Quảng Trị Province, Annam Protectorate, French Indochina
- Died: 10 July 1986 (aged 79) Hanoi, Vietnam
- Resting place: Mai Dịch Cemetery
- Party: Communist Party of Vietnam (1930–1986)
- Spouses: Lê Thị Sương (m. 1929) Nguyễn Thụy Nga (m. 1950)
- Children: 7 (including Lê Vũ Anh)

Lê Duẩn (Vietnamese: [lē zʷə̂n]; 7 April 1907 – 10 July 1986) was a Vietnamese communist politician. He rose in the party hierarchy in the late 1950s and became General Secretary of the Central Committee of the Communist Party of Vietnam (VCP) at the 3rd National Congress in 1960. When Ho Chi Minh died in 1969, he consolidated power to become the undisputed leader of North Vietnam. Upon the fall of South Vietnam at the end of the Vietnam War in 1975, he subsequently ruled the newly unified Socialist Republic of Vietnam from 1976 until his death in 1986.

He was born into a lower-class family in Quảng Trị Province, in the Annam Protectorate of French Indochina as Lê Văn Nhuận. Little is known about his family and childhood. He first came in contact with revolutionary thought in the 1920s through his work as a railway clerk. Lê Duẩn was a founding member of the Indochina Communist Party (the future Communist Party of Vietnam) in 1930. He was imprisoned in 1931 and released in 1937. From 1937 to 1939, he climbed the party ladder. He was rearrested in 1939, this time for fomenting an uprising in the South. Lê Duẩn was released from jail following the successful Communist-led August Revolution of 1945.

During the First Indochina War (1946–1954), Lê Duẩn was an active revolutionary leader in South Vietnam. He headed the Central Office of South Vietnam, a Party organ, from 1951 until 1954. During the 1950s, Lê Duẩn became increasingly aggressive towards South Vietnam and called for reunification through war. By the mid-to-late 1950s, Lê Duẩn had become the second-most powerful policy-maker within the Party, eclipsing former Party First Secretary Trường Chinh. By 1960, he was officially the second-most powerful Party member, after Party chairman Hồ. Throughout the 1960s, Hồ's health declined, and Lê Duẩn assumed more of his responsibilities.

Following Hồ's death in 1969, Lê Duẩn assumed leadership of North Vietnam. Throughout the Second Indochina War (1955–1975), Le Duan was called Vietnam's Joseph Stalin due to having adopted an aggressive posture, prioritizing the use of large-scale attacks to achieve victory. When South Vietnam was reunited with North Vietnam in 1976, he assumed the new title of General Secretary of the Communist Party of Vietnam. Later in December 1978, Lê Duẩn oversaw Vietnam's invasion of Cambodia, which ultimately led to the fall of the Chinese-backed Khmer Rouge on 7 January 1979. This had a serious impact on relations between Vietnam and China, with Vietnam responding with a period of deportation of ethnic Chinese Hoa people. China invaded the northern Vietnamese border, which was to be known as the Sino-Vietnamese War in 1979, though it was short-lived and remained inconclusive. From then on, Vietnam maintained a closer alliance with the Soviet Union and joined Comecon in 1978.

Lê remained General Secretary until he died in 1986. He died in Hanoi; his successor was initially Trường Chinh. Lê Duẩn was also known as Lê Dung and was known in public as "anh Ba" (third brother).

== Early life and career ==
Lê Duẩn was born as Lê Văn Nhuận in Bich La village, Triệu Đông, Triệu Phong, Quảng Trị province on 7 April 1907 (although some sources cite 1908) to a poor family with 5 children. Locals from his generation say that Duan's parents were metal scrap collectors and blacksmiths. The son of a railway clerk, he became active in revolutionary politics as a young man. He received a French colonial education before working as a clerk for the Vietnam Railway Company in Hanoi during the 1920s. Through his job, he came into contact with several communist activists. In this period, he educated himself to a Marxist.

Lê Duẩn became a member of the Vietnamese Revolutionary Youth League in 1928. He cofounded the Indochina Communist Party in 1930. Lê Duẩn was imprisoned the next year. He was released six years later, in 1937. From 1937 to 1939, he advanced in the party hierarchy and at the 2nd National Congress, he joined its Central Committee. He was imprisoned again the following year for fomenting an uprising. After five years, he was released, shortly after the 1945 August Revolution, in which the Indochinese Communist Party took power. Following his release, he became a trusted associate of Hồ Chí Minh, the lead figure of the party.

During the First Indochina War, Lê Duẩn served as the Secretary of the Regional Committee of South Vietnam, at first in Cochinchina in 1946, but was reassigned to head the Central Office of South Vietnam from 1951 until 1954. The Viet Minh's position in the South became increasingly tenuous by the early to mid-1950s, and in 1953, Lê Duẩn was replaced by his deputy Lê Đức Thọ and moved to northern Vietnam.

=== The "Road to the South" ===
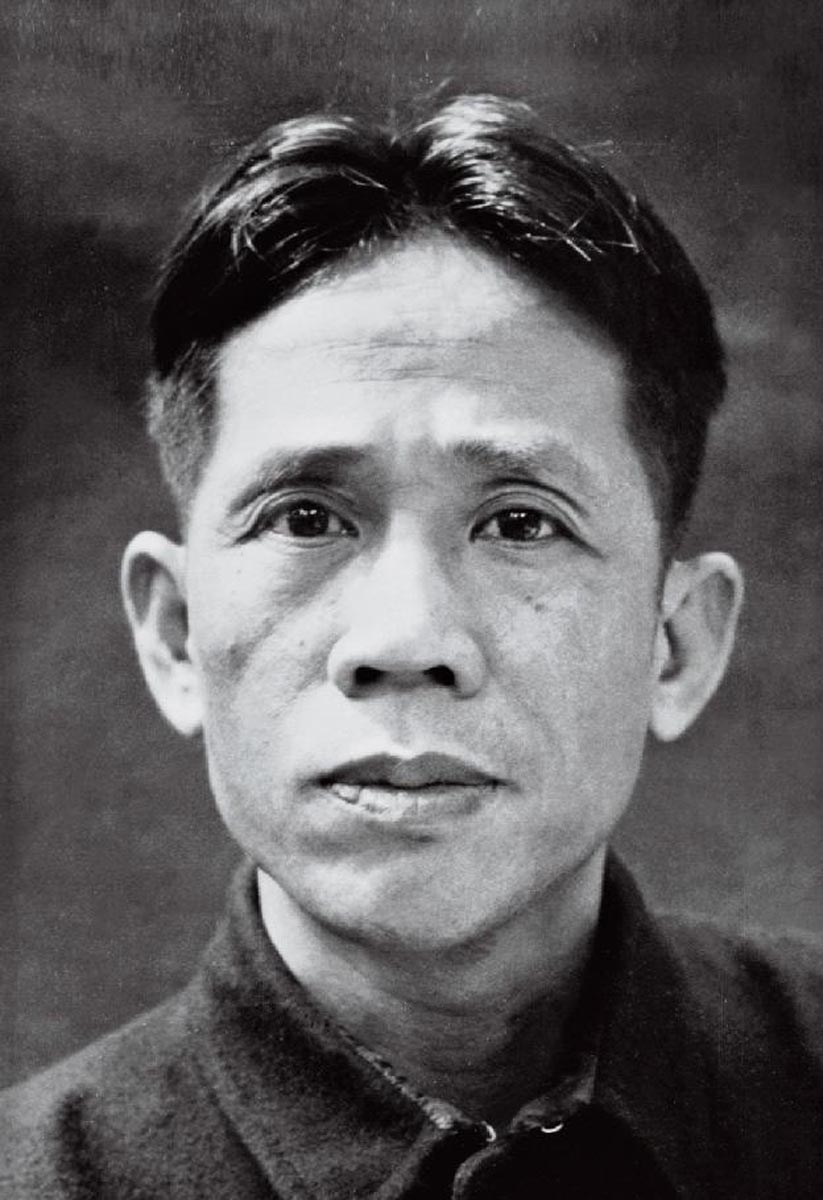
Lê Duẩn in 1951

In the aftermath of the 1954 Geneva Accords, which split Vietnam into North and South, Lê Duẩn was responsible for reorganising the Việt Minh combatants who had fought in South and Central Vietnam. While most Việt Minh fighters were regrouped to North Vietnam as stipulated in the Accords, 5,000 to 10,000 fighters were left in the south as a base for future insurgency.

In South Vietnam, Ngo Dinh Diem’s regime countered the communists by launching the "Denounce the Communists" campaign. Tens of thousands of suspected communists were detained in "political re-education centers". There were also increasing attacks by communist cadres, with over 450 South Vietnamese officials assassinated in 1956. The North Vietnamese government claimed that over 65,000 individuals were imprisoned and 2,148 killed in the process by November 1957. According to historian Gabriel Kolko, from 1955 to the end of 1958, 40,000 political prisoners had been jailed and many were executed. Historian Guenter Lewy considers such figures exaggerated, stating that there were only 35,000 prisoners in total in South Vietnam during the period.

As opposition to Diem's rule in South Vietnam grew, Lê Duẩn wrote The Road to the South, calling for revolution to overthrow his government and forcefully reunify Vietnam. His thesis became the blueprint for action at the 11th Central Committee Plenum in March 1956. Although "The Road to the South" was formally accepted, his plan was not fully implemented until later, as both China and the Soviet Union opposed full-scale conflict in Vietnam at the time. In 1956 Lê Duẩn was appointed to the secretariat of the party. He was ordered by the Politburo in August 1956 to guide the communist insurgency in South Vietnam. That same month, he traveled from U Minh to Bến Tre and instructed the southern communists to stop fighting in the name of religious sects. Throughout the year, the party had been split on the issue of land reform in the North. Lê Duẩn remained neutral, allowing him to act as the First Secretary (head of the Communist Party) on Hồ's behalf in late 1956.

In 1957, he was given a seat in the Politburo. At the 1957 May Day parade, Trường Chinh was still seated as the country's second most powerful figure. Lê Duẩn was gradually able to place his supporters, notably Lê Ðức Thọ, in top positions and outmaneuver his rivals. He visited Moscow in November 1957 and received approval for his war plans. In December 1957, Hồ told the 13th Plenary Session of a "dual revolution"; Trường Chinh became responsible for the socialist transformation of the north, while Lê Duẩn focused on planning the offensive in the south.

By 1958, Lê Duẩn ranked second only to Hồ in the party hierarchy, although Trường Chinh remained powerful. Lê Duẩn was a party man and never held a post in the government. He made a brief, secret visit to South Vietnam in 1958, writing a report, The Path to Revolution in the South, in which he stated that the North Vietnamese had to do more to assist the southern fighters. In January 1959, under increasing pressure from southern communist cadres who were being successfully targeted by Diem's regime, the Central Committee in Hanoi approved plans for North Vietnam to fully support the effort to overthrow the South Vietnamese government and reunify Vietnam under a communist government. In July 1959, North Vietnam invaded Laos, occupying eastern parts of the country to establish the Ho Chi Minh trail which would be used to send soldiers and weapons to South Vietnam.

=== First Secretary ===
Lê Duẩn was informally chosen as the First Secretary of the party by Hồ in 1959, at the January plenum of the Central Committee, and was elected to the post de jure at the 3rd National Congress. According to Bùi Tín, he was not Hồ's original choice for the post; his preferred candidate was Võ Nguyên Giáp, but since Lê Duẩn was supported by the influential Lê Đức Thọ, the Head of the Party Organisational Department, Lê Duẩn was picked for the post. He was considered a safe choice because of his time in prison during the French rule, his thesis The Road to the South and his strong belief in Vietnamese reunification.

According to Stein Tønnesson, Le Duan had not, like Ho Chi Minh, traveled around the world during his youth. He had not, like Pham Van Dong or Vo Nguyen Giap, worked closely with Ho Chi Minh from the 1940s. Ho Chi Minh's decision to leave the party leadership to Le Duan in the years 1957-1960, and to endorse his formal election in 1960, must be interpreted as a way to ensure national unity. At a time when Vietnam was divided into two, and many southern cadres had been regrouped to the north, the safest way to ensure that the Vietnam Worker Party remained a party for all of Vietnam was probably to make the leader of the southern branch the leader of the whole party. Presumably, this was the motive behind Ho Chi Minh's choice.

== General Secretary leadership ==
=== Political infighting and power ===
Lê Duẩn was officially named First Secretary of the Communist Party of Vietnam in 1960, thereby succeeding Hồ as the party's de facto leader even though the latter remained its chairman. However, Hồ continued to influence North Vietnam's governance: Lê Duẩn, Tố Hữu, Trường Chinh, and Phạm Văn Đồng (all of whom were influential figures in the country's politics during and after the war) often shared dinner with him. In 1963, Hồ purportedly corresponded with South Vietnamese President Ngô Đình Diệm in the hope of achieving a negotiated peace. Together with Lê Đức Thọ, Head of the Party Organisational Department and Nguyễn Chí Thanh, a military general, Lê Duẩn tried to monopolise the decision-making process – this became even more evident following Hồ's death. In 1964, Hồ's health began to fail and Lê Duẩn, as his trusted underling, more visibly took on day-to-day decision-making responsibilities. Some Western analysts claim that by 1965 Hồ and Lê Duẩn had split and that "for all intents and purposes" Lê Duẩn had sidelined Hồ. Lê Duẩn, Lê Đức Thọ and Phạm Hùng "progressively tried to neutralise Hồ Chí Minh" and Phạm Văn Đồng.

By the late-1960s, Hồ's declining health had weakened his position within the leadership. While Hồ was still consulted on important decisions, Lê Duẩn dominated the Party. When Hồ died on 2 September 1969, the collective leadership he had espoused continued, but Lê Duẩn was first among equals. The Central Committee's first resolution following Hồ's death pledged to uphold the collective leadership. Lê Duẩn chaired Hồ's funeral committee and gave the event's final speech.

From the beginning the party leadership had split into pro-Soviet, pro-Chinese and moderate factions. Under Hồ the party had followed a policy of neutrality between the Soviet Union and the People's Republic of China in the aftermath of the Sino–Soviet split. This policy continued until reunification. While the Politburo made decisions through consensus, Lê Duẩn, through his post as General Secretary, was the most powerful figure and was able to increase his power via his alliance with Lê Đức Thọ, Trần Quốc Hoàn and Võ Nguyên Giáp. Together with Lê Đức Thọ, Lê Duẩn controlled personnel appointments in the Ministry of Internal Affairs, the State Planning Commission, the Ministry of Foreign Affairs, the General Political Directorate of the People's Army of Vietnam (PAVN), the General Logistics Department of the PAVN and the Ministry of Transport.

To strengthen their hold on power, Lê Duẩn and Lê Đức Thọ established a patronage network. For instance Lê Đức Thọ's brother, Đinh Đức Thiện was appointed Minister of Communications and Transport; in April 1982 Đồng Sĩ Nguyên, a protégé of Lê Duẩn, became Minister of Transport. Mai Chí Thọ, friend of Lê Đức Thọ, was Chairman of the People's Committee of Hồ Chí Minh City (equivalent to a mayor) from 1978 to 1985. Several of Lê Duẩn's relatives were appointed to offices in the propaganda and culture sector. However, with the exception of Mai Chí Thọ none of these figures reached the pinnacles of power in Vietnamese politics.

=== Vietnam War ===
At the 3rd National Congress, Lê Duẩn called for the establishment of a South Vietnamese people's front. The Central Committee supported the proposal. A Central Committee resolution stated that "The common task of the Vietnamese revolution at present is to accelerate the socialist revolution in North Vietnam whilst at the same time stepping up the National People's Democratic Revolution in South Vietnam." On 20 December 1960, three months later, the Viet Cong was established. Lê Duẩn claimed that the Việt Cộng would "rally 'all patriotic forces' to overthrow the Diệm government [in the South] and thus ensure 'conditions for the peaceful reunification of the Fatherland'".

After the Sino–Soviet split, the Vietnamese Communist leadership divided into pro-China and pro-Soviet factions. From 1956 to 1963, Lê Duẩn played a moderating role between the two factions, but with the death of Diệm and the Gulf of Tonkin incident, he became considerably more radical. The Chinese continued to support them throughout the war, with Liu Shaoqi, the President of the People's Republic, in 1965 stating, "it is our policy that we will do our best to support you." Unlike Hồ, who wanted a peaceful resolution, Lê Duẩn was far more militant. He wanted, in his own words, "final victory". Howard Jones claimed Duẩn dismissed Hồ's position, as did the majority of the Politburo, calling him "naive". When Hồ called for the establishment of a neutral South Vietnamese state in 1963, Lê Duẩn responded by making overtures to the Chinese, who rejected the Soviet position of peaceful coexistence.

With the increased involvement of the United States military in 1965, the North's military strategy was forced to change. As Lê Duẩn noted in a letter to Nguyễn Chí Thanh, the war would become "fiercer and longer". He believed the fundamentals of the conflict had not changed; the South Vietnamese regime's unpopularity remained its "Achilles' heel" and he continued to advocate a combination of guerrilla warfare and PAVN offensives. The communist commanders in the South were to avoid large attacks on the Army of the Republic of Vietnam (ARVN), but instead focus on many small attacks to demoralize the enemy. Lê Duẩn believed that the key to victory was for the PAVN to keep the initiative. He dismissed the possibility of an attack against North Vietnam by American forces, claiming that an attack on North Vietnam would be an attack on the entire socialist camp.

In 1967, despite the opposition of some party leaders, Lê Duẩn and his militant group adopted General Nguyễn Chí Thanh's operational plan for the General Offensive/General Uprising involving attacks on ARVN and Republic of Vietnam Government installations throughout South Vietnam, which they believed would spark a spontaneous popular uprising among the South Vietnamese population forcing the US and its allies to depart. After having sidelined, and in some cases arrested, opponents of the plan, this would be adopted as the official strategy to win the war. The General Offensive/General Uprising would be launched during the Tết holiday in January/February 1968. The Tet Offensive would prove to be a military defeat, but a strategic success. Despite the failure of the offensive, the North Vietnamese launched a Phase II attack in May 1968 and a Phase III attack in August 1968, both of which were repulsed, with the PAVN and VC again suffering large casualties. After the failure of these attacks, COSVN issued Directive 55 on 5 April 1969 to all of its subordinate units: "Never again and under no circumstances are we going to risk our entire military force for just such an offensive. On the contrary, we should endeavor to preserve our military potential for future campaigns."

By July 1974, following the cut-off of U.S aid to South Vietnam, the North Vietnamese leadership had decided to abrogate the Paris Peace Accords and to invade in 1975, instead of 1976 as previously planned, because they believed an earlier Vietnamese unification would put Vietnam in a stronger position against Chinese and Soviet influence. In his victory speech, Lê Duẩn stated: "Our party is the unique and single leader that organised, controlled and governed the entire struggle of the Vietnamese people from the first day of the revolution." In his speech he congratulated the Provisional Revolutionary Government of the Republic of South Vietnam (PRGRSV), the underground South Vietnamese government established in 1969, for liberating South Vietnam from imperialism. PRGRSV-ruled South Vietnam did not last long, however, and in 1976 the reunified Socialist Republic of Vietnam was established. Lê Duẩn purged South Vietnamese who had fought against the North, imprisoning up to 300,000 people in re-education camps (not including "dissidents detained in the many prisons of Vietnam") and captured Hoa people's property (the Chinese who live in Vietnam), setting off a mass exodus and humanitarian disaster (see Vietnamese boat people).

=== Economy ===
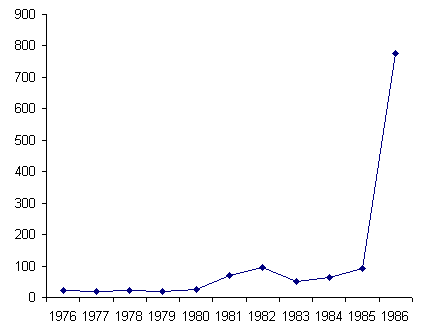
Inflation in retail prices in Vietnam since unification until the 6th National Congress in 1986

Vietnam developed little during the war years; industry was nearly non-existent in both North and South and both countries were dependent on foreign donor countries. Worse, the country's critical agricultural infrastructure had been badly damaged. The South had roughly 20,000 bomb craters, 10 million refugees, 362,000 war invalids, 1,000,000 widows, 880,000 orphans, 250,000 drug addicts, 300,000 prostitutes and 3 million unemployed.

Having won the war and defeated Republic of Vietnam, Lê Duẩn's mood in April 1975 was optimistic. As one Central Committee member put it, "Now nothing more can happen. The problems we face now are trifles compared to those in the past." Lê Duẩn promised the Vietnamese people in 1976 that each family would own a radio set, refrigerator and TV within ten years; he seemed to believe he could easily integrate the South Vietnamese consumer society with agrarian North Vietnam. In 1976 the 4th National Congress declared Vietnam would complete its socialist transformation within twenty years. This optimism proved unfounded; instead Vietnam staggered from one economic crisis to another.

After the war, per-capita income stood at US$101; it decreased to $91 in 1980 and then increased to $99 by 1982, according to United Nations figures. Phạm Văn Đồng admitted that per-capita income "had not increased compared to what it was ten years ago". Physical health declined and malnutrition increased under Lê Duẩn, according to the Ministry of Health. According to the International Herald Tribune, an estimated six million Vietnamese were suffering from malnutrition, leading the government to request aid from the United Nations Food and Agriculture Organization. Lê Duẩn's policies and the war against Pol Pot (1976-1979) and China (1979) led to an abrupt decline in the standard of living; monthly per capita income in the North declined from $82 in 1976 to $58 in 1980.

The main goals of the Second Five-Year Plan (1976–80), which was initiated at the 4th National Congress, were as follows;

1. Concentrate the forces of the whole country to achieve a leap forward in agriculture; vigorously develop light industry
2. [T]urn to full account existing heavy industry capacity and build many new industrial installations, especially in the machine industry, so as to support primary agriculture and light industry
3. [V]irtually complete socialist transformation in the South

The Vietnamese leadership expected to reach these targets with economic aid from the Council for Mutual Economic Assistance (COMECON) and loans from international agencies of the capitalist world. The 4th National Congress made it clear that agriculture would be socialised; however, during the Second Five-Year Plan the socialisation measures went so badly that Võ Chí Công, a Politburo member and Chairman of the Committee for the Socialist Transformation of Agriculture, claimed it would be impossible to meet the targets set by the plan by 1980. An estimated 10,000 out of 13,246 socialist cooperatives, established during the plan, had collapsed in the South by 1980. Politburo member Lê Thanh Nghị attacked lower-level cadres for the failure of the socialist agriculture transformation. The collectivisation process led to an abrupt drop in food production in 1977 and 1978, leading the 6th Plenum of the Central Committee to completely overhaul the Party's agricultural policies.

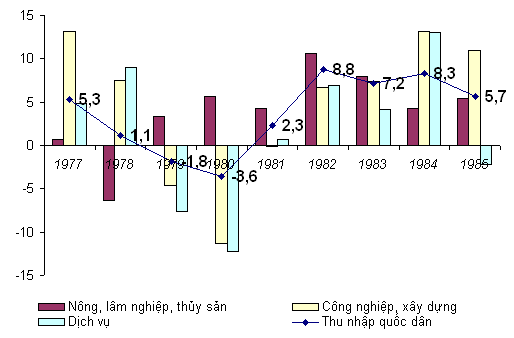
Real national income growth in Vietnam from 1976 until 1985

With regard to heavy industry, the leadership's position was muddled. In his Fourth Political Report Lê Duẩn stated that during the transition to socialism, priority would be given to heavy industry "on the basis of developing agriculture and light industry". In another section of the report, Lê Duẩn stated that light industry would be prioritised ahead of heavy industry. The position of Phạm Văn Đồng, the Chairman of the Council of Ministers (the head of government), was just as confused as Lê Duẩn's. In practice Lê Duẩn prioritised heavy industry: 21.4% of state investment was in heavy industry in the Second Five-Year Plan and 29.7 percent in the Third Five-Year Plan (1981–85). Light industry only received 10.5 and 11.5, respectively. From 1976 to 1978 industry grew, but from 1979 to 1980 industrial production fell substantially. During the Second Five-Year Plan industry grew just 0.1 percent. The 6th Plenum of the Central Committee criticised the policy that the state had to own everything.

Before the 5th Central Committee Plenum, Lê Duẩn believed that Vietnam was in a perilous position, although no talk of reforms followed. Beginning in 1979, Lê Duẩn acknowledged that economic policy mistakes had been made by the national Party and State leadership.

Until the 6th plenum, the planners prevailed. That plenum condemned the old ways and promised that from then on the economy would be governed by "objective laws". The roles of the plan and the market were openly discussed for the first time and the roles of the family and the private economy were enhanced and certain market prices were officially supported by the Party. Lê Duẩn endorsed the reforms at the 1982 5th National Congress. Lê Duẩn talked about the need to strengthen both the central planned economy and the local economy at once. In his report Lê Duẩn admitted that the Second Five-Year Plan had been a failure economically.

At the beginning these changes had little practical effect, possibly due to opposition by the planners and confusion or fear among cadres. From 1981 to 1984 agricultural production grew substantially, but the government did not use this opportunity to increase production of such crucial farm inputs as fertilizer, pesticide and fuel, nor of consumer goods. By the end of Lê Duẩn's rule, in 1985–1986, inflation had reached over 100% annually, complicating economic policy-making.

=== Foreign relations ===
==== Relations with the Eastern Bloc ====
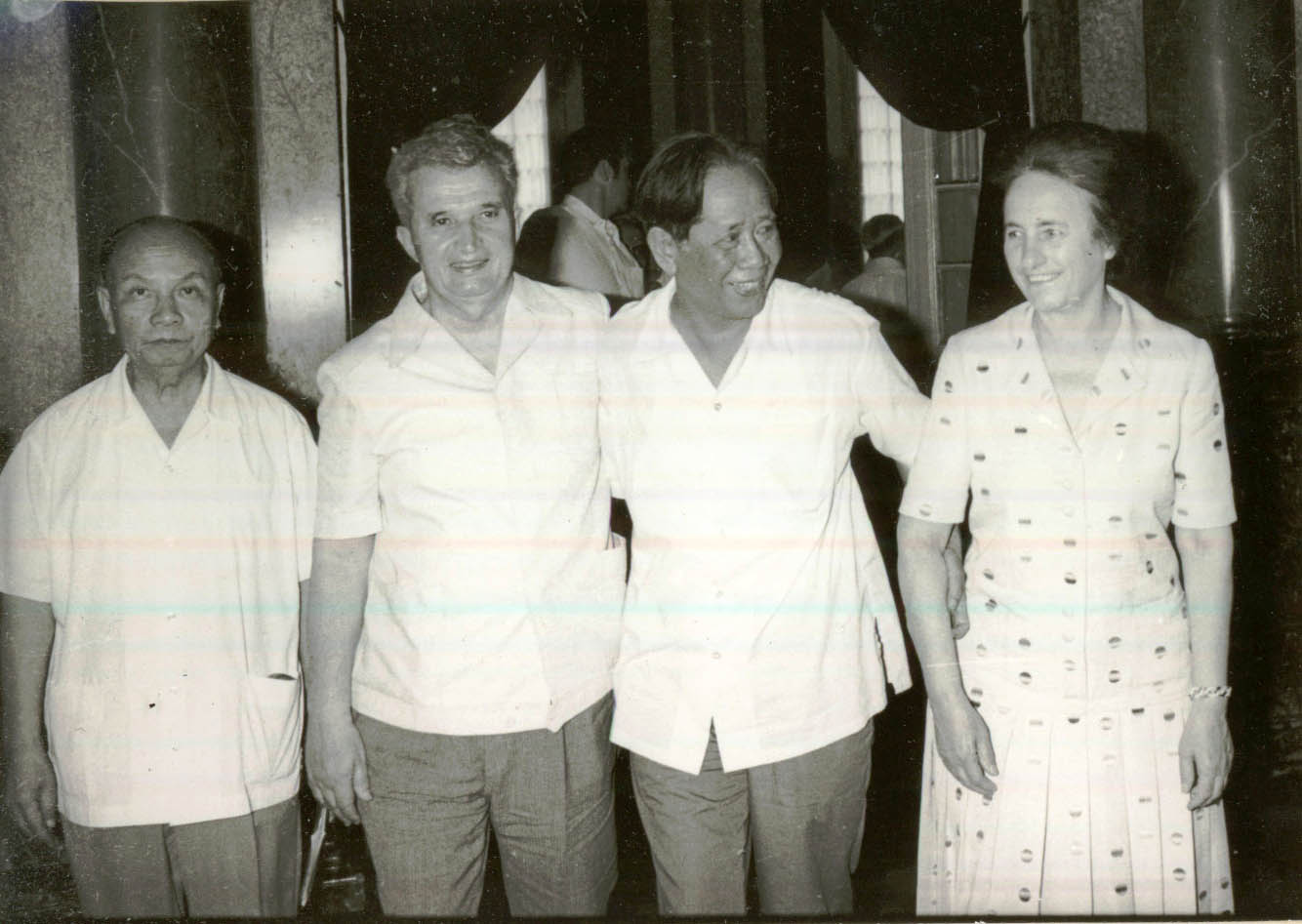
Lê Duẩn and Trường Chinh with Nicolae and Elena Ceaușescu from the Socialist Republic of Romania

Lê Duẩn visited the Soviet Union in October 1975. The result of the visit was an official communique, which stated that the Soviets would send qualified experts to the country to educate and train economic, scientific, technical and cultural personnel. The Soviet Union gave Vietnam economic assistance and supported several national economic projects on most favoured terms. The communique stated that cooperation was within the "frameworks of multilateral cooperation of socialist countries." Such a statement would normally have meant membership in COMECON, but Vietnam was not a member, wanting to establish its sovereignty. Phạm Văn Đồng snubbed the Soviet ambassador during the anniversary of the October Revolution and rejected key Soviet foreign policies. Despite continued pressure from the Soviets to join COMECON, Vietnam declined. Instead Vietnam joined the International Monetary Fund and the World Bank, moves the Soviet Union opposed.

Vietnam relented in 1978, seeking economic aid to fund the Second Five-Year Plan. In 1978 Lê Duẩn and Phạm Văn Đồng signed a 25-year Treaty of Friendship and Mutual Cooperation with the USSR. Under Soviet protection, Vietnam invaded Kampuchea. In reaction China invaded Vietnam. Vietnam leased several bases to the Soviet Union to protect its territory from China. It was rumored that one of China's demands for peace was the ending of Soviet assistance to Vietnam. In Asia Vietnam played a role similar to Cuba's in Latin America: it supported local revolutionary groups and was a headquarters for Soviet-style communism. Vietnam supported the Soviet invasion of Afghanistan and received $3 million a day in military aid.

At the 5th National Congress, Lê Duẩn reaffirmed Vietnam's relations with the USSR. He stated, "Solidarity and co-operation with the USSR: such is the corner stone of the external policy of our Party and of our State." He further noted that their alliance was "a guarantee of the victory of the defense of the motherland and the socialist edification of our people." Soviet official Mikhail Gorbachev echoed Lê Duẩn's sentiments and said "Vietnam can count on the solidarity and the support of the USSR."

Lê Duẩn's foreign policy was criticised by Hoàng Văn Hoan, who accused him of sacrificing the country's sovereignty. A delegation led by Vitaly Vorotnikov, visited Vietnam during its National Day, the holiday that celebrated the establishment of North Vietnam after the August Revolution and met with Lê Duẩn. Lê Duẩn attended the 27th Communist Party Congress and later met with Gorbachev. Soviet Premier Nikolai Ryzhkov and Anatoly Dobrynin attended Lê Duẩn's funeral.

==== Relations with China ====
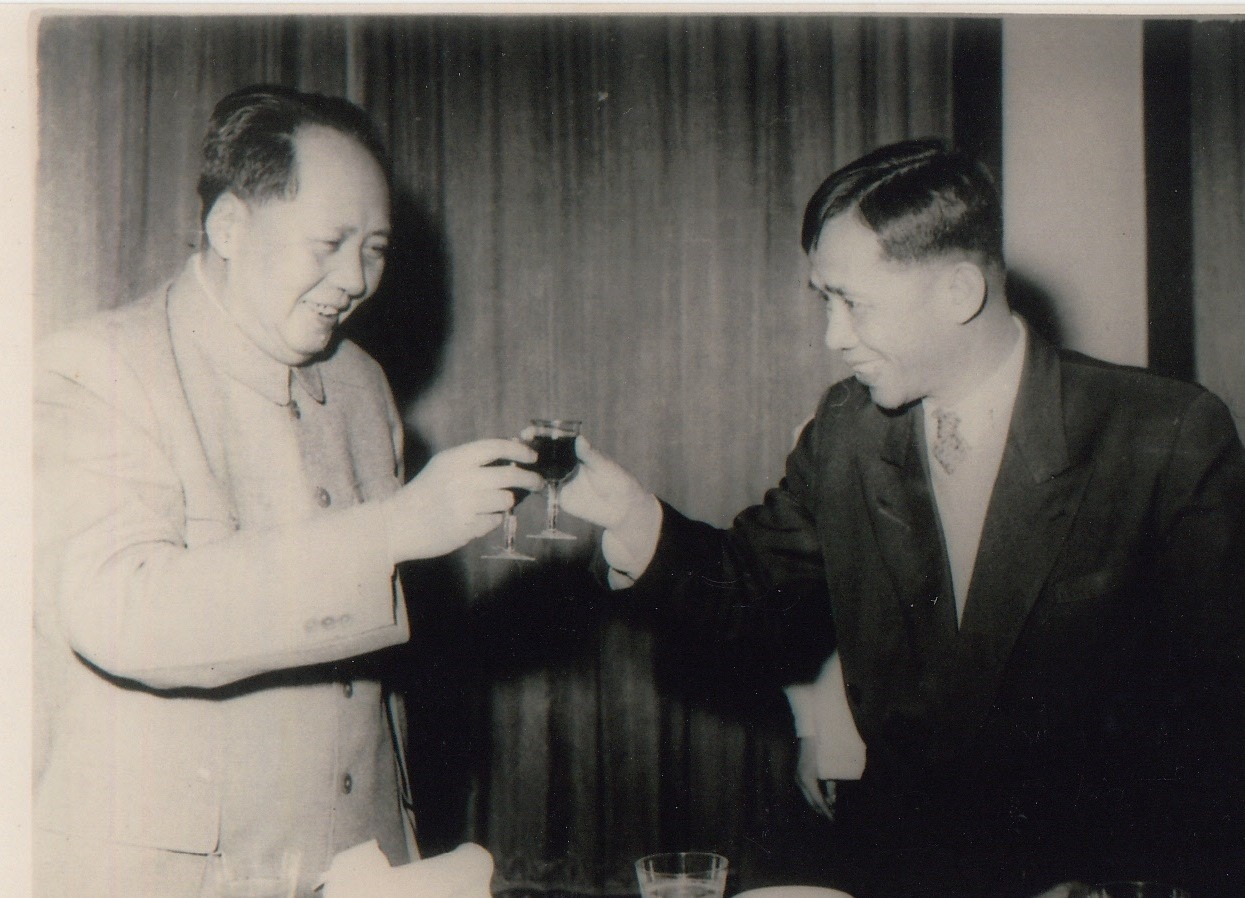
Lê Duẩn with Mao Zedong (1964)

During the Vietnam War, the Chinese claimed that the Soviet Union would betray North Vietnam. Chinese Premier Zhou Enlai told Lê Duẩn that the Soviets would lie to them to improve its relationship with the United States. According to Zhou this policy was enacted following Alexei Kosygin's departure from Vietnam in 1965. Lê Duẩn did not accept this view and at the 23rd Party Congress (which China boycotted) he referred to the Soviet Union as a "second motherland". Because of his statement, China immediately began to cut its aid to North Vietnam. According to the first secretary at the Soviet embassy to China, the North Vietnamese saw the Chinese actions as an attack on them. At the Chinese Communist Party's 45th anniversary, instead of a communique by Hồ Chí Minh, Phạm Văn Đồng and Lê Duẩn as had happened at the 44th anniversary, the Vietnamese Central Committee offered official greetings, but without signatures from top-level officials.

Relations between the two countries further deteriorated following the China/US rapprochement. The North Vietnamese, who were still fighting the Americans, felt betrayed. At the CPV Politburo meeting on 16 July 1971, the North Vietnamese agreed that Chinese policy towards the United States was like a "torpedo" directed against North Vietnam. Zhou was told by Phạm Văn Đồng and Lê Duẩn that US President Richard Nixon's upcoming visit to China was "against the interests of Vietnam". Later, in November, Phạm asked the Chinese to cancel Nixon's visit; the Chinese refused. The North Vietnamese began to doubt China and they hid information about North Vietnam's next planned military offensive. The Sino/US rapprochement did not hurt Sino/Vietnamese relations in the long run, because the Soviet Union also eventually reconciled with the US.

Chinese and North Vietnamese documents state that relations between them worsened in 1973–75. A Vietnamese document claimed that China hindered the eventual reunification, while Chinese documents claimed that the source of the conflict was Vietnamese policy towards the Spratly and the Paracel Islands. However, the core issue for the Chinese was to minimize Vietnam's cooperation with the Soviets. Increasing Soviet/Vietnamese cooperation left China ambivalent about reunification.

During Lê Duẩn's China visit in June 1973, Zhou told him that North Vietnam should adhere to the Paris Peace Accords. Following the signing, Lê Thanh Nghị stated that the direction of Vietnam's communism was directly linked to its relations with the Soviet Union. The Chinese opposed immediate reunification and to that end, began making economic agreements with the Provisional Revolutionary (Communist) Government of South Vietnam (PRGSV). PRGSV head Nguyễn Hữu Thọ was treated well by the Chinese. This policy further damaged relations. China and Vietnam drifted further apart; eventual Chinese aid did not improve relations.

Lê Thanh unsuccessfully visited China in August 1975 to seek aid. On 22–28 September, Lê Duẩn and Lê Thanh visited China in a second attempt. During the visit the Vietnamese wanted to assure the Chinese they were interested in maintaining good relations with both China and the Soviet Union. Deng Xiaoping stated that both superpowers acted as imperialists and sought hegemony. Lê Duẩn in a speech did not mention the Soviet Union by name, but noted that Vietnam had succeeded because of help from other socialist countries, meaning the Eastern bloc. Two agreements were signed, but no non-refundable aid agreement was made. No joint communique was issued and Lê Duẩn left earlier than planned. According to Anne Gilks, the Sino/Vietnamese alliance effectively ended with the Fall of Saigon. Relations with China further deteriorated; several leading pro-Chinese communists were purged from the party.

Lê Duẩn visited China from 20 to 25 November 1977 to seek aid. CPC Chairman Hua Guofeng stated that Sino/Vietnamese relations had deteriorated because they held different principles. Hua insisted that China could not help Vietnam because of its own economic difficulties and differences in principles. Lê Duẩn countered that the only difference was how they viewed the Soviet Union and the United States. Following his visit, China's state-run Xinhua News Agency condemned COMECON. China halted all economic development projects between May and July 1978. During this period total Chinese aid to Vietnam amounted to $300 million.

==== Sino-Vietnamese War ====
On 17 February 1979, the Chinese People's Liberation Army crossed the Vietnamese border, withdrawing on 5 March after a two-week campaign which devastated northern Vietnam and briefly threatened Hanoi. Both China and Vietnam suffered heavy losses. Peace talks broke down in December 1979 and both China (400,000) and Vietnam (600,000) began a major build-up of forces along the border. Sporadic fighting on the border occurred throughout the 1980s and China threatened to force Vietnam's exit from Kampuchea.

==== Vietnamese invasion and occupation of Cambodia ====
The independent Kampuchean Communist Party (KCP) was established alongside the Vietnamese and Laotian parties following the dissolution of the Indochinese Communist Party in 1955. The Kampuchean movement was the weakest of the three. When the Vietnamese began formal military aid to the Khmer Rouge in 1970, the Khmer leadership remained skeptical. On the orders of Võ Chí Công two regiments were sent into Kampuchea. Võ Chí Công promised Khmer leader Ieng Sary that Vietnamese troops would withdraw when the conflict had been won by the communists. The entry of Vietnamese troops led many Vietnamese officials to believe that Khmer Rouge officials had begun "to fear something". In a conversation with Phạm Hùng, Lê Duẩn told him that despite some differences in opinions, the "authentic internationalism and attitude" of the sides would strengthen their party-to-party relations. After reading reports by Võ Chí Công, Lê Duẩn probably concluded that "authentic internationalism" in Kampuchea was in trouble. At the time, the Vietnamese leadership hoped this situation would change, but privately they understood that the Kampuchean situation was different from the Lao situation.

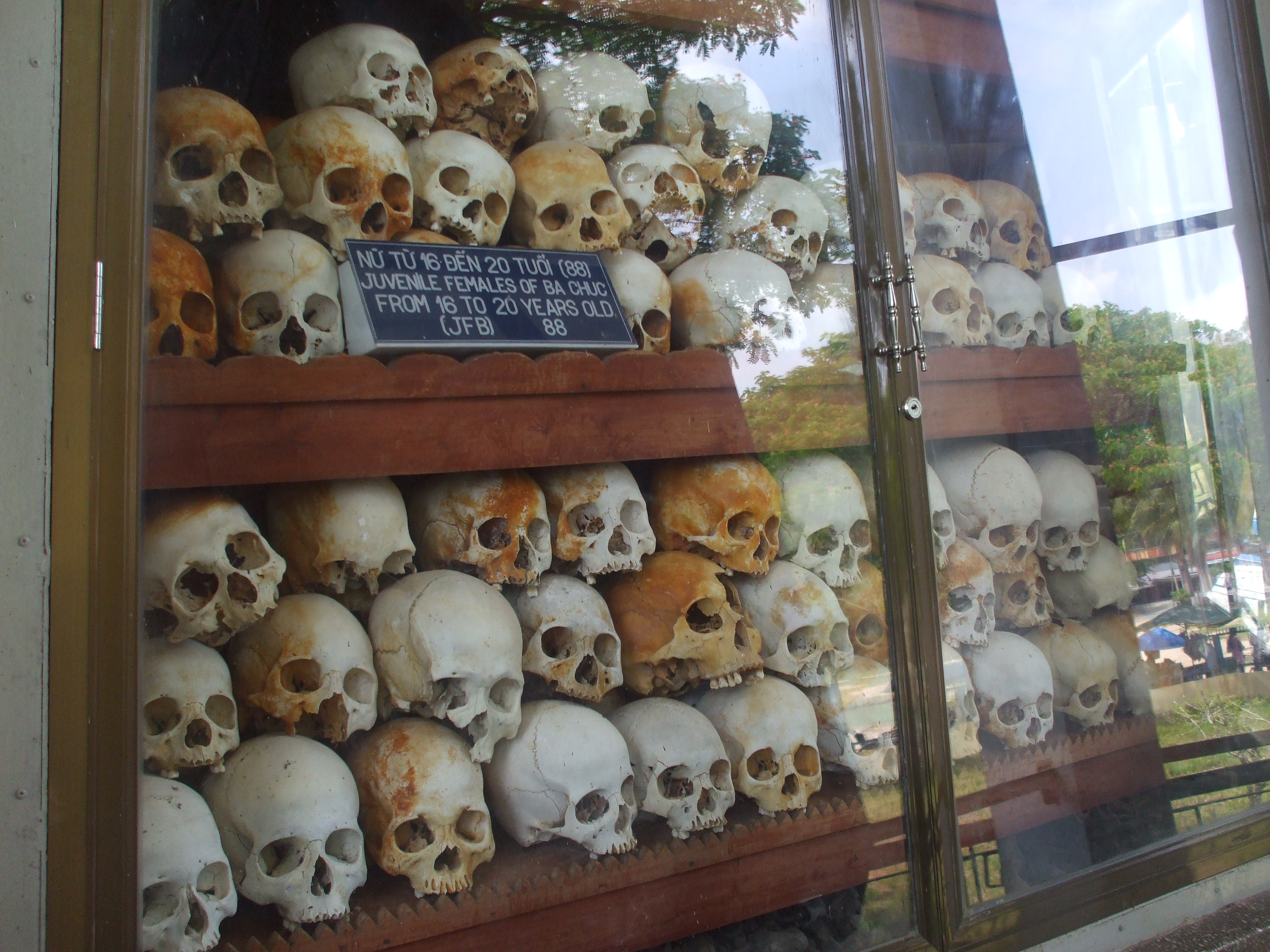
The Ba Chuc massacre was perpetrated by the Kampuchean Revolutionary Army during one of their attacks on Vietnam in 1978

After Pol Pot and his supporters seized control of KCP in 1973, KCP/VCP relations deteriorated sharply. North Vietnamese formations that were active in Kampuchea during the Cambodian Civil War were thereafter regularly attacked by their allies. By 1976, while it appeared that Kampuchea/Vietnam relations were normalizing, private suspicions within the respective leaderships grew. Lê Duẩn, Tôn Đức Thắng, Trường Chinh and Phạm Văn Đồng sent messages congratulating the ascension of Pol Pot, Khieu Samphan and Nuon Chea as Premier, President of the Presidium and President of the Assembly of the People's Representative, respectively. In turn, KCP sent a congratulatory message to the PRGRSV on its seventh anniversary. On 21 September 1976 a Vietnamese women's delegation visited Kampuchea and the KCP sent public greetings to the 4th National Congress. The Vietnamese leadership hoped that pro-Vietnamese elements would develop within the KCP. When Kampuchean radio announced Pol Pot's resignation, Lê Duẩn and the Vietnamese leadership took it seriously. During a meeting with the Soviet ambassador, Lê Duẩn told him that Pol Pot and Ieng Sary had been removed from the KCP leadership. The change was welcome to Vietnam, since the two were a "pro-Chinese sect conducting a crude and severe policy." Lê Duẩn added that "these were bad people [the KCP leadership headed by Pol Pot]", but that Nuon Chea was "our man and is my personal friend." All-out confrontation was not planned and Lê Duẩn still believed that state-to-state relations could improve. He further noted that Kampuchea would eventually become like Laos, a socialist state, and value its relationship with Vietnam and the Soviet Union.

On 30 April 1977, Democratic Kampuchea attacked several Vietnamese villages in An Giang Province, most notably in the Ba Chúc massacre. The Vietnamese leadership was shocked by this unprovoked attack and counterattacked. Vietnam still sought improved relations and when Pol Pot, on 27 September 1977, announced the existence of the KCP, Vietnam sent a congratulatory note. In a conversation with the Soviet ambassador on 6 October, Lê Duẩn had no explanation for Kampuchea's actions. He described the leadership as "strongly nationalistic and under strong influence of Peking [China]." Lê Duẩn called Pol Pot a Trotskyist while claiming that Ieng Sary was "a fierce nationalist and pro-Chinese." He erroneously believed that Nuon Chea and Son Sen harbored pro-Vietnamese views.

"The Pol Pot – Ieng Sary clique have proved themselves to be the most disgusting murderers in the later half of this century. Who are behind these hangmen whose hands are smeared with the blood of the Kampuchean people, including the Cham, who have been almost wiped out as an ethnic group, the Viet and the Hoa? This is no mystery to the world. The Pol Pot – Ieng Sary clique are only a cheap instrument of the bitterest enemy of peace and mankind. Their actions are leading to national suicide. This is genocide of a special type. Let us stop this self-genocide! Let us stop genocide at the hands of the Pol Pot – Ieng Sary clique!

— An editorial featured in Nhân Dân, the party newspaper and the largest paper in Vietnam

On 31 December 1977, Kampuchea broke relations with Vietnam, stating that the "aggressor forces" from Vietnam sent had to be withdrawn. This was needed to "restore the friendly atmosphere between the two countries." While they accused Vietnam of aggression, the real problem all along was the Vietnamese leadership' plan, or ideal, of establishing a Vietnamese-dominated Indochinese Federation. Vietnamese troops withdrew from the country in January, taking thousands of prisoners and civilian refugees. While the point of the Vietnamese attack had been to dampen the Kampuchean leadership's aggressive stance, it had the opposite effect – the Kampuchean leadership treated it as a major victory over Vietnam, matching their victory over the Americans. Kampuchea did not respond to diplomatic overtures and began another attack. Vietnam responded by promoting an uprising against Pol Pot's rule and invaded.

On 15 June 1978, the VCP Politburo sent a request to the Soviet Union to allow a delegation headed by Lê Duẩn to meet with Leonid Brezhnev and the Soviet leadership in general. In a meeting with the Soviet ambassador in September, Lê Duẩn said that Vietnam intended "to solve fully this question [of Kampuchea] by the beginning of 1979." Lê Duẩn did not believe that China would retaliate because it would have to send its forces by sea, although China did attack in 1979, but chose Vietnam as its target. He claimed that Vietnam had little time and that waiting would benefit China. He further claimed that Vietnam had established nine battalions of Khmer deserters and that it was seeking Sao Pheum to lead them. In fact, Sao Pheum had been dead for three months. Lê Duẩn still believed that Nuon Chea was a friend of Vietnam, despite his largely anti-Vietnam speech. Nuon Chea and Son Sen remained staunch Pol Pot supporters until the 1990s.

Vietnam sent 13 divisions into the country on 25 December 1978, with an estimated 150,000 soldiers supported by heavy artillery and air power. Kampuchea attempted a conventional defense, but this tactic led to the loss of half of its army within two weeks. The defeats prompted much of the Kampuchean leadership to evacuate to the western region of the country. On 7 January 1979, the PAVN and the Kampuchean United Front for National Salvation entered Phnom Penh, forcing Pol Pot and the Khmer Rouge to abandon the capital by fleeing themselves back into the jungle near Thailand as its border between Anlong Veng and the Dângrêk Mountains which continued as an insurgency between 1979 and 1997. On the following day, a pro-Vietnamese state, known as the People's Republic of Kampuchea (PRK), was established, with Heng Samrin as head of state and Pen Sovan as General Secretary of the Kampuchean People's Revolutionary Party. The struggle between the Khmer Rouge and the PRK ended only with Vietnam's withdrawal in 1989.

=== Last years and death ===
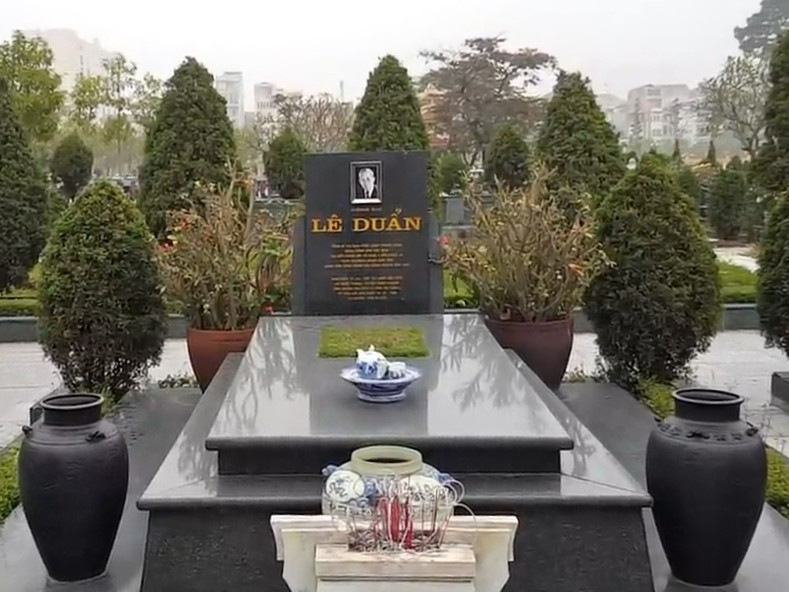
Lê Duẩn's grave in Mai Dich Cemetery.

By the time of the 5th National Congress, the party leadership had turned into a veritable gerontocracy. The five most powerful Politburo members were all over the age of 70; Lê Duẩn was 74, Trường Chinh was 75, Phạm Văn Đồng was 76, Phạm Hùng was 70 and Lê Đức Thọ was 72. Lê Duẩn is believed to have been in bad health during this period; he had travelled to the Soviet Union on several occasions for medical treatment during the late-1970s and early 1980s. It was reported that Lê Duẩn did not lead the party delegates of the 5th National Congress to the Hồ Chí Minh Mausoleum because of his deteriorating health. Lê Duẩn looked both feeble and old; he had problems reading his report to the Congress.

Regardless of his health, the Lê Duẩn/Lê Đức Thọ clique still retained considerable power during the 5th National Congress; they were able to fill the 5th Central Committee, the 5th Secretariat and the 5th Politburo with their own supporters. Several moderates and old companions of Hồ Chí Minh as well as pro-Chinese communists (labelled dismissively as Maoists) and followers of Trường Chinh were removed from the Politburo and the Central Committee. General Võ Nguyên Giáp was forced to leave the Politburo, though it was more to remove Giap as a figure of influence rather than for ideological reasons. Nguyễn Duy Trinh and Lê Thanh Nghị were removed from the Politburo because of their moderate stances, while Trần Quốc Hoàn, Lê Văn Lương and Nguyễn Văn Linh were removed because of their alignment with Trường Chinh. In their place Lê Duẩn and Lê Đức Thọ appointed military men, including Đỗ Mười, Lê Đức Anh and General Đồng Sĩ Nguyên. The appointment of Nguyễn Đức Tâm and Nguyễn Cơ Thạch strengthened Lê Đức Thọ. The Lê Duẩn/Lê Đức Thọ clique thereafter had a clear majority within the 5th Secretariat.

Lê Duẩn's report to the 5th National Congress was a biting self-criticism of his leadership and the party's management. He criticised political and economic corruption and the gerontocracy itself. The 5th Central Committee contained only one member under 60. During this period the Central Committee was disrupted by factional infighting between pragmatists and conservatives. This struggle would lead to economic reform called Đổi Mới beginning in 1986 as Lê Duẩn and his supporters began the effort to open the economy. According to reports, after the Congress Lê Duẩn suffered a heart attack and was hospitalized in the Soviet Union. He remained General Secretary until on 10 July 1986 he died of natural causes in Hanoi at age 79. He was temporarily succeeded by Trường Chinh, who himself retired from the post and was replaced by Nguyễn Văn Linh(who had returned to the Politburo in 1985) at the December 6th National Congress. He was buried at Mai Dich Cemetery.

== Personal life ==
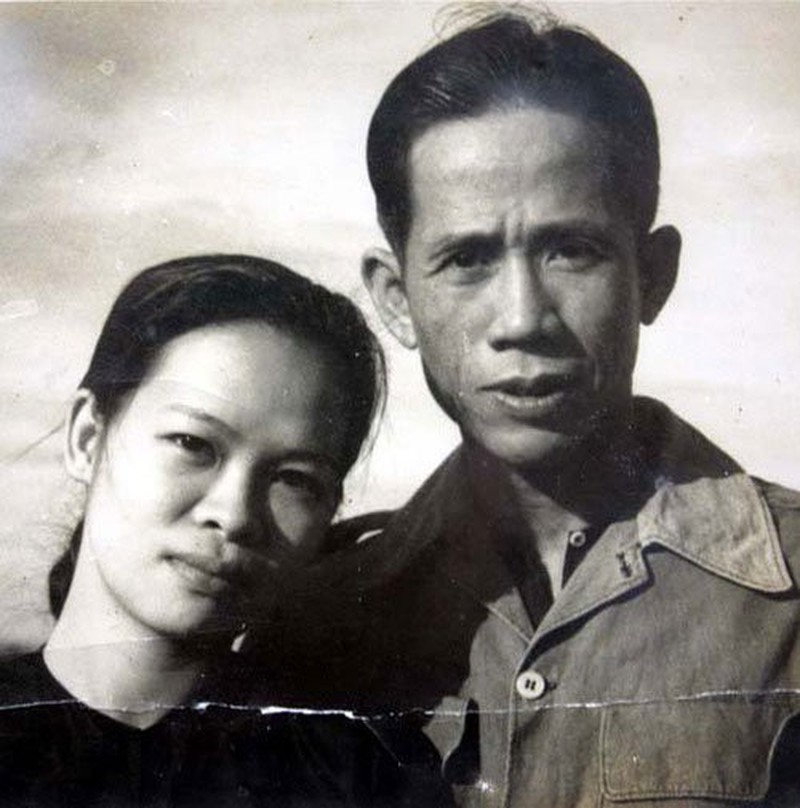
Lê Duẩn with his second wife Nguyễn Thụy Nga

In 1929, Lê Duẩn married Lê Thị Sương (1910–2008). They had four children from the marriage: daughters (Lê Tuyết Hồng, Lê Thị Cừ, Lê Thị Muội) and son (Lê Hãn).

In 1950, Lê Duẩn remarried to Nguyễn Thụy Nga (1925–2018). They had three children: daughter (Lê Vũ Anh) and sons (Lê Kiên Thành, Lê Kiên Trung).

== Political beliefs ==
To a degree, Lê Duẩn was a socialist nationalist, and during the war he claimed that the "nation and socialism were one". He stressed the importance of building socialism politically, economically and culturally and of defending the socialist fatherland. When compared to Phạm Văn Đồng, he was referred to as a "pragmatist". On occasion, he broke with orthodox Marxism–Leninism to stress Vietnam's uniqueness, most notably in agriculture. Lê Duẩn's view of socialism was statist, highly centralised and managerial. Opposing Soviet revisionist policy under Khrushchev, Duẩn's position before 1965 is described as "pro-Chinese". As the Hanoi leadership came to see Vietnam as the vanguard of world revolution and sometimes challenged both Moscow and Beijing from the 1970s onward, Duẩn is also described as a proletarian internationalist.

In one of his own works, Lê Duẩn talked about "the right of collective mastery" but in practice opposed it. For instance, party cadres who presented the peasants' demands for higher prices for their products at the National Congress were criticised by Lê Duẩn. His ideas of collective mastery were hierarchical: "Management by the state aims at ensuring the right of the masses to be the collective masters of the country. How then will the state manage its affairs so as to ensure this right of collective mastery?" His answer to this problem was managerial and statist.

Lê Duẩn's concept of "collective mastery" was featured in the 1980 Vietnamese Constitution as was his concept of "collective mastery" of society. The concept was Lê Duẩn's version of popular sovereignty that advocated an active role for the people so that they could become their own masters as well as masters of society, nature and the nation. It stated that the people's collective mastery in all fields was assured by the state and was implemented by permitting their participation in state affairs and in mass organisations. On paper, the organisations, to which almost all citizens belong, play an active role in government and have the right to introduce bills before the National Assembly. Lê Duẩn said that land ownership entailed a "struggle between the two roads – collective production and private production; large-scale socialist production and small scattered production." Since it was believed that collective ownership was the only alternative to capitalism, it was introduced without controversy by the country's leadership.

Subcontracting co-operatives to peasants became the norm by the late 1970s and was legalised in 1981. For conservatives, that policy was similar to that of Lenin's New Economic Policy, a temporary break from hardline socialist development. However, those who supported reforms saw subcontracting as another way of implementing socialism in agriculture, which was justified by the ideological tenet of the "three interests". That was an important ideological innovation and broke with Lê Duẩn's "two roads" theory.

Lê Duẩn departed from Marxist–Leninist orthodoxy when it came to practical policy and stated that the country had to "carry out agricultural cooperation immediately, even before having built large industry." While he acknowledged that his view was heresy, Lê Duẩn insisted that Vietnam was in a unique situation: "It seems that no country so far in history has been in a situation such as ours. We must lead the peasantry and agriculture immediately to socialism, without waiting for a developed industry, though we know very well that without the strong impact of industry, agriculture cannot achieve large-scale production and new relations of agriculture cannot be consolidated... To proceed from small-scale production to large-scale production is a new one." According to Lê Duẩn, the key to socialism was not mechanisation and industrialisation but a new division of labour. He also believed that co-operatives needed to be not autarkic but "organically connected, through the process of production itself, with other cooperatives and with the state economic sector." Vietnam could achieve this through state intervention and control. He saw the economy as one whole directed by the state and not many parts intertwined.

In his victory speech after the 1976 parliamentary election, Lê Duẩn talked about perfecting socialism in the North by eliminating private ownership and the last vestiges of capitalism and of the need to initiate socialist transformation in the South where, the party, according to Lê Duẩn, would focus on abolishing the comprador bourgeoisie and the last "remnants of the feudal landlord classes". "Comprador bourgeoisie" was their term for the bourgeois classes, which made a living by financial dealings and through transactions with Westerners. Lê Duẩn did not reveal that in addition to removing the comprador bourgeoisie and the feudal landlord classes from the South, he intended to obliterate the entire bourgeois class.

== Honours and awards ==
- Vietnam:
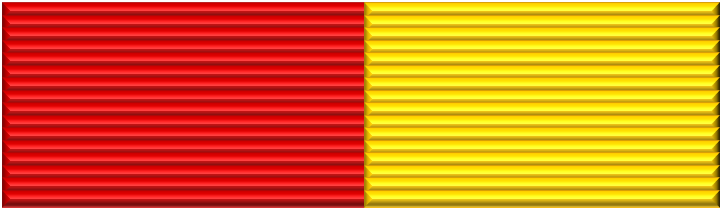
  - Gold Star Order
- Cuba:
  - Order of José Martí (1982)
- Czechoslovakia:
  - Order of Klement Gottwald (1982)
- East Germany:
  - Order of Karl Marx (1982)
- Laos:
  - National Gold Medal
- Soviet Union:
  - Order of Lenin (1982)
  - Lenin Peace Prize

A square in the Yasenevo District of Moscow, was named in honor of him.

== Bibliography ==
- Ang, Cheng Guan (1997). Vietnamese Communists' Relations with China and the Second Indochina Conflict, 1956–1962. McFarland & Company. ISBN 9780786404049.
- Ang, Cheng Guan (2002). The Vietnam War From the Other Side: The Vietnamese Communists' Perspective. Routledge. ISBN 9780700716159.
- Brocheux, Pierre (2007). Ho Chi Minh: a Biography. Cambridge University Press. ISBN 978-1107622265.
- Chen, King (1987). China's War With Vietnam, 1979: Issues, Decisions and Implications. Hoover Press. ISBN 9780817985721.
- Christie, Clive J. (1998). Southeast Asia in the Twentieth Century: a Reader. I.B. Tauris. ISBN 9781860640636.
- Corfield, Justin (2008). The History of Vietnam. ABC-CLIO. ISBN 9780313341946.
- Currey, Cecil B. (2005). Victory at Any Cost: The Genius of Viet Nam's Gen. Vo Nguyen Giap. Potomac Books, Inc. ISBN 9781612340104.
- Duiker, William J. (1994). U.S. Containment Policy and the Conflict in Indochina. Stanford University Press. ISBN 9780804722834.
- Europa Publications (2002). Far East and Australasia. Routledge. ISBN 9781857431339.
- Joint Committee on Southeast Asia of the American Council of Learned Societies; Social Science Research Council (1988). Postwar Vietnam: Dilemmas in Socialist Development. Southeast Asia Program Publications. ISBN 9780877271208.
- Jones, Howard (2003). Death of a Generation: How the Assassinations of Diem and JFK prolonged the Vietnam War. Oxford University Press. ISBN 9780195052862.
- Khoo, Nicholas (2011). Collateral Damage: Sino – Soviet Rivalry and the Termination of the Sino – Vietnamese Alliance. Columbia University Press. ISBN 9780231150781.
- Lien-Hang, Nguyen (2012). Hanoi's War. University of North Carolina Press. ISBN 9780807882696.
- Lomperis, Timothy J. (1996). From People's War to People's Rule: Insurgency, Intervention and the Lessons of Vietnam. University of North Carolina Press. ISBN 9780807845776.
- Morris, Stephen J. (1999). Why Vietnam invaded Cambodia: Political Culture and Causes of War. Chicago: Stanford University Press. ISBN 978-0-8047-3049-5.
- Ooi, Keat Gin (2004). Southeast Asia: a Historical Encyclopedia, from Angkor Wat to East Timor. Vol. 2. ABC-CLIO. ISBN 9781576077702.
- Quinn-Judge, Sophie (2002). Ho Chi Minh: The Missing Years, 1919–1941. University of California Press. ISBN 9780520235335.
- Kiernan, Ben (2006). "External and Indigenous Sources of Khmer Rouge Ideology". In Westad, Odd A.; Sophie (eds.). The Third Indochina War: Conflict between China, Vietnam and Cambodia, 1972–79. New York: Routledge. ISBN 978-0-415-39058-3.
- Roberts, Priscilla Mary (2006). Behind the Bamboo Curtain: China, Vietnam and the World Beyond Asia. Stanford University Press. ISBN 9780804755023.
- Rothrock, James (2006). Divided We Fall: How Disunity Leads to Defeat. AuthorHouse. ISBN 9781425911072.
- Sawinski, Diane M. (2001). Vietnam War: Biographies. U.X.L. ISBN 9780787648862.
- Shane-Armstrong, R. (2003). The Vietnam War. University of Wisconsin. ISBN 9780737714333.
- St. John, Ronald Bruce (2006). Revolution, Reform and Regionalism in Southeast Asia: Cambodia, Laos and Vietnam. Taylor & Francis. ISBN 9780415701846.
- Stern, Lewis M. (1987). "The Vietnamese Communist Party in 1986: Party Reform Initiatives, the Scramble towards Economic Revitalization and the Road to the Sixth National Congress". Southeast Asian Affairs. 4 (1). Institute of Southeast Asian Studies: 345–363. JSTOR 27908584.
- Trung, Thai Quang (2002). Collective Leadership and Factionalism: an Essay on Ho Chi Minh's Legacy. Institute of Southeast Asian Studies. ISBN 9789971988012.
- Trung, Thai Quang (September 1982). "The Fifth Congress of the Vietnamese Communist Party". Contemporary Southeast Asia. 4 (1). Institute of Southeast Asian Studies: 236–245. JSTOR 25797712.
- Tucker, Spencer C. (2011). The Encyclopedia of the Vietnam War: A Political, Social and Military History. ABC-CLIO. ISBN 9781851099610.
- Van, Canh Nguyen; Cooper, Earle (1983). Vietnam under Communism, 1975–1982. Hoover Press. ISBN 9780817978518.
- Võ, Nhân Trí (1990). Vietnam's Economic Policy since 1975. Institute of Southeast Asian Studies. ISBN 9789813035546.
- Woods, L. Shelton (2002). Vietnam: a Global Studies Handbook. ABC-CLIO. ISBN 9781576074169.
- Zemtsov, Ilya; Farrar, John (2007). Gorbachev: The Man and the System. Transaction Publishers. ISBN 9781412807173.

== Notes ==
Party political offices
Preceded by Hồ Chí Minh	General Secretary of the Communist Party of Vietnam; 1960–1986	Succeeded by Trường Chinh
