= U Minh =

- Commune
- Location in Vietnam
- Coordinates: 9°13′5″N 105°5′0″E
- Country: Vietnam
- Province: Cà Mau
- Establish: June 16, 2025

Area
  - Total: 145 km^{2} (56 sq mi)

Population 2025
  - Total: 32.991 people
  - Density: 0.228/km^{2} (0.589/sq mi)
- Time zone: UTC+07:00 (Indochina Time)
- Website: uminh.camau.gov.vn

U Minh is a commune (xã) of Cà Mau province, in Vietnam.

The Standing Committee of the National Assembly issued Resolution No. 1655/NQ-UBTVQH15 on the rearrangement of commune-level administrative units of Cà Mau Province in 2025 (the resolution takes effect from 16 June 2025). Accordingly, U Minh Commune was established in Cà Mau Province on the basis of the entire natural area of 65.40 km² and a population of 13,077 people of Khánh Hòa Commune; the entire natural area of 66.3 km² and a population of 15,835 people of Khánh Tiến Commune; the adjustment of 5.10 km² in natural area with a population of 950 people from Khánh Thuận Commune; and the adjustment of 8.20 km² in natural area with a population of 3,129 people from Khánh Lâm Commune, all belonging to U Minh District.

== Geography ==
U Minh Commune is situated as follows:

- To the east, it borders Nguyễn Phích Commune.
- To the west, it borders the Gulf of Thailand.
- To the south, it borders Khánh Lâm Commune.
- To the north, it borders An Giang Province.

U Minh Commune covers an area of 145 km²; as of 2024, it has a population of 32,991 people, resulting in a population density of approximately 0 people/km².

== Administration ==
U Minh Commune is divided into 21 hamlets, numbered from 1 to 21.

== History ==
On September 20, 1975, the Politburo issued Resolution No. 245-NQ/TW regarding the merger of Bạc Liêu Province, Cà Mau Province, and two districts of Rạch Giá Province—An Biên and Vĩnh Thuận (excluding the communes of Đông Yên and Tây Yên)—into a new province; the name of the new province and the location of its provincial capital were to be proposed by local authorities.

On December 20, 1975, the Politburo issued Resolution No. 19/NQ regarding the merger of Bạc Liêu Province and Cà Mau Province into a new province; the name of the new province and the location of its provincial capital were to be proposed by local authorities.

On February 24, 1976, the Provisional Revolutionary Government of the Republic of South Vietnam issued Decree No. 3/NQ/1976 regarding the merger of Bạc Liêu Province and Cà Mau Province into a new province named Bạc Liêu – Cà Mau Province.

On March 10, 1976, the Government issued a Resolution regarding the establishment of Minh Hải Province by renaming Bạc Liêu – Cà Mau Province.

On December 29, 1978, the Government Council issued Decision No. 326-CP regarding:

- The establishment of U Minh District within Minh Hải Province, formed from a portion of Thới Bình District.
- The transfer of Khánh Lâm Commune (formerly of Thới Bình District) to the administration of the newly established U Minh District.

On July 25, 1979, the Government Council issued Decision No. 275-CP regarding the division of Khánh Lâm Commune (in U Minh District) into five communes: Khánh Hòa, Khánh Hội, Khánh Lâm, Khánh Tân, and Khánh Tiến.

On November 6, 1996, the National Assembly issued Resolution regarding the division of Minh Hai Province into Bac Lieu Province and Ca Mau Province.

On June 4, 2009, the Government issued Resolution No. 24/NQ-CP regarding the establishment of Khanh Thuan Commune within U Minh District, based on the transfer of 17,148 hectares of natural area and a population of 13,127 from Khánh Hòa Commune.

Following the administrative boundary adjustment, Khánh Hòa Commune retained a natural area of 6,390.99 hectares and a population of 9,648.

As of December 31, 2014:

- Khánh Hòa Commune comprised 6 hamlets: 2, 5, 6, 7, 8, and 14.
- Khánh Tiến Commune comprised 12 hamlets: 1, 2, 3, 4, 5, 6, 7, 8, 9, 10, 11, and 12.
- A portion of Khánh Lâm Commune comprised 2 hamlets (9 and 10), as well as parts of Hamlet 1 and Hamlet 4.
- A portion of Khánh Thuận Commune comprised parts of Hamlet 1, Hamlet 3, and Hamlet 4.

On June 12, 2025, the National Assembly issued Resolution No. 202/2025/QH15 regarding the reorganization of provincial-level administrative units (effective from June 12, 2025).

Under this resolution, Bạc Liêu Province was merged into Ca Mau Province. June 16, 2025:

- The National Assembly issued Resolution No. 203/2025/QH15 on amending and supplementing a number of articles of the Constitution of the Socialist Republic of Vietnam. Accordingly, the operations of district-level administrative units nationwide were terminated effective July 1, 2025.
- The National Assembly Standing Committee issued Resolution No. 1655/NQ-UBTVQH15 on the reorganization of commune-level administrative units in Ca Mau Province in 2025 (effective June 16, 2025). Accordingly, U Minh Commune (Ca Mau Province) was established based on the entirety of the natural area (65.40 km²) and population (13,077 people) of Khanh Hoa Commune; the entirety of the natural area (66.3 km²) and population (15,835 people) of Khanh Tien Commune; an adjustment of 5.10 km² of natural area and a population of 950 people from Khanh Thuan Commune; and an adjustment of 8.20 km² of natural area and a population of 3,129 people from Khanh Lam Commune (all within U Minh District).

U Minh Commune has a natural area of 145 km² and a population of 32,991 people.

== Economy ==
Like other areas in Cà Mau, this commune is characterized by a dense network of canals and waterways with brackish water. Water transport is the primary mode of travel. The local economy relies mainly on fishing and brackish-water aquaculture, producing species such as crabs, black tiger shrimp, and giant river prawns.
