= Hồ Thị Kỷ =

- Commune and village
- Interactive map of Hồ Thị Kỷ
- Coordinates: 9°15′38″N 105°07′20″E
- Country: Vietnam
- Province: Cà Mau
- District: Thới Bình
- Time zone: UTC+07:00

Hồ Thị Kỷ is a commune (xã) and village in Thới Bình district, Cà Mau province, in Vietnam, Named after National Hero Hồ Thị Kỷ.
