= Biển Bạch =

- Commune and village
- Interactive map of Biển Bạch
- Country: Vietnam
- Province: Cà Mau
- Time zone: UTC+07:00

Biển Bạch is a commune (xã) and village in Cà Mau province, in Vietnam.

The Standing Committee of the National Assembly issued Resolution No. 1655/NQ-UBTVQH15 on the rearrangement of commune-level administrative units of Cà Mau Province in 2025 (the resolution takes effect from 16 June 2025). Accordingly, Biển Bạch Commune was established in Cà Mau Province on the basis of the entire natural area of 41.70 km² and a population of 9,072 people of Biển Bạch Commune; the entire natural area of 71.40 km² and a population of 14,491 people of Biển Bạch Đông Commune; and the entire natural area of 45.10 km² and a population of 12,139 people of Tân Bằng Commune, all formerly belonging to Thới Bình District.
