= Nguyễn Phích =

Commune and village in Vietnam

Coordinates: 9.3575°N 104.9972°E

- Commune and village
- Interactive map of Nguyễn Phích
- Country: Vietnam
- Province: Cà Mau
- District: U Minh
- Time zone: UTC+07:00

Nguyễn Phích is a commune (xã) and village in U Minh district, Cà Mau province, in Vietnam.
