= Thới Bình district =

Coordinates: 9.417°N 105.167°E

Thới Bình district Huyện Thới Bình
- District
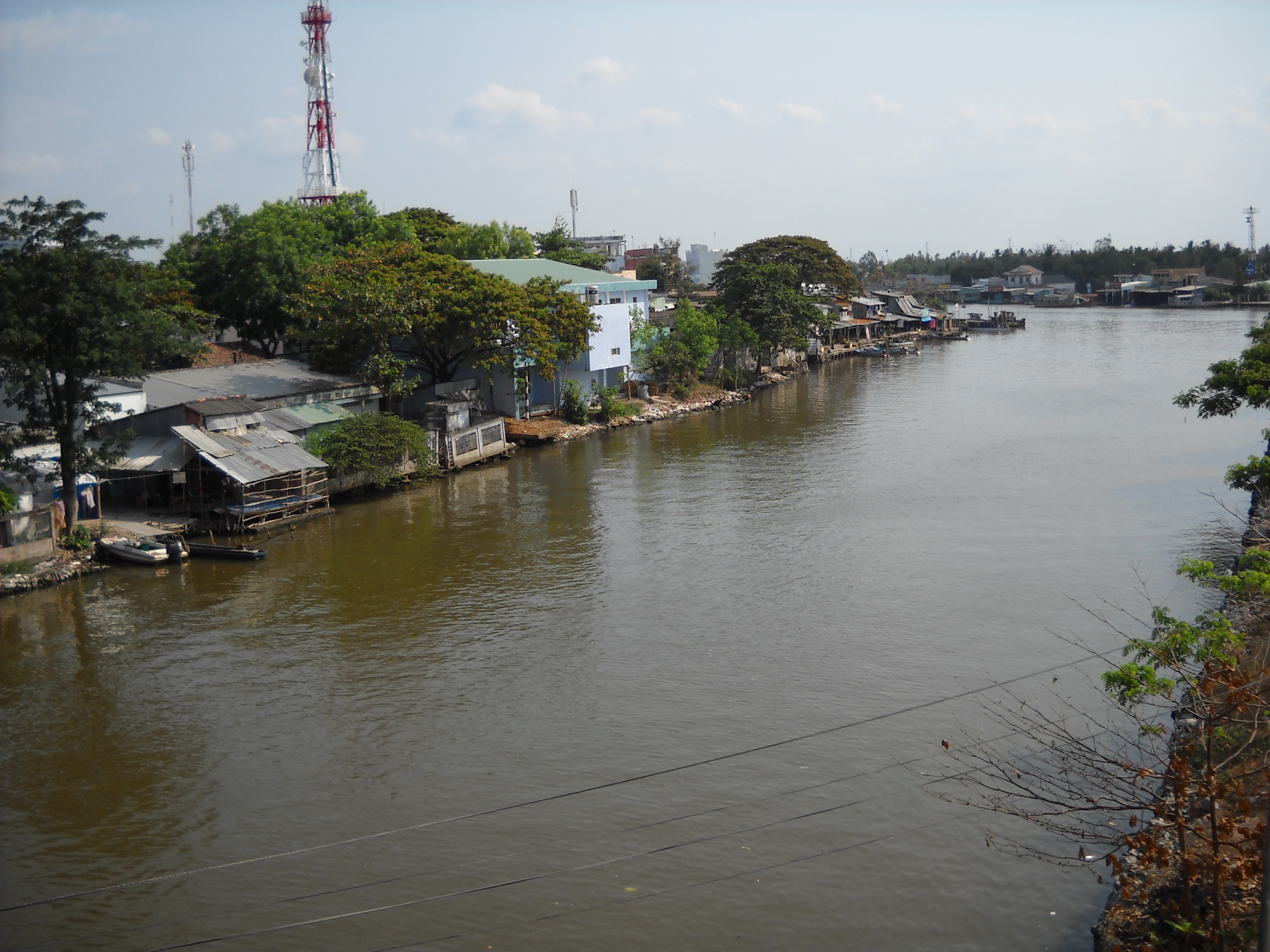
- Thới Bình canal.

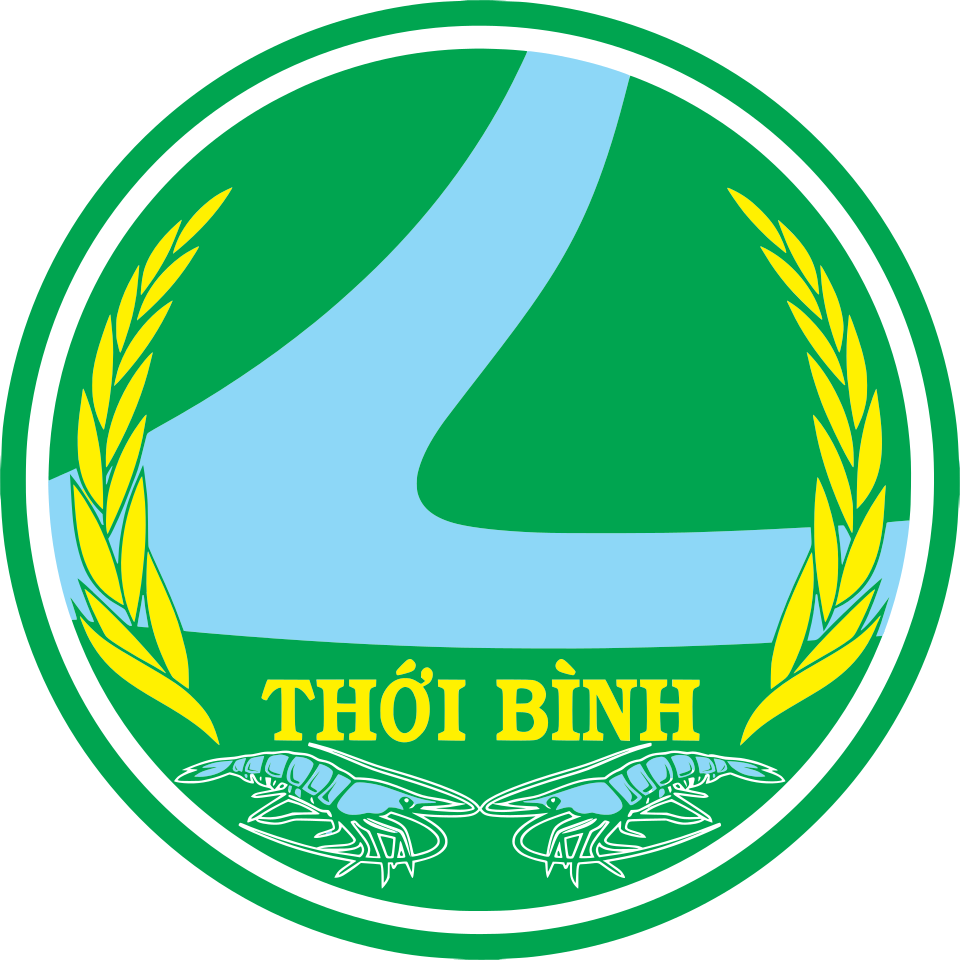
- Seal

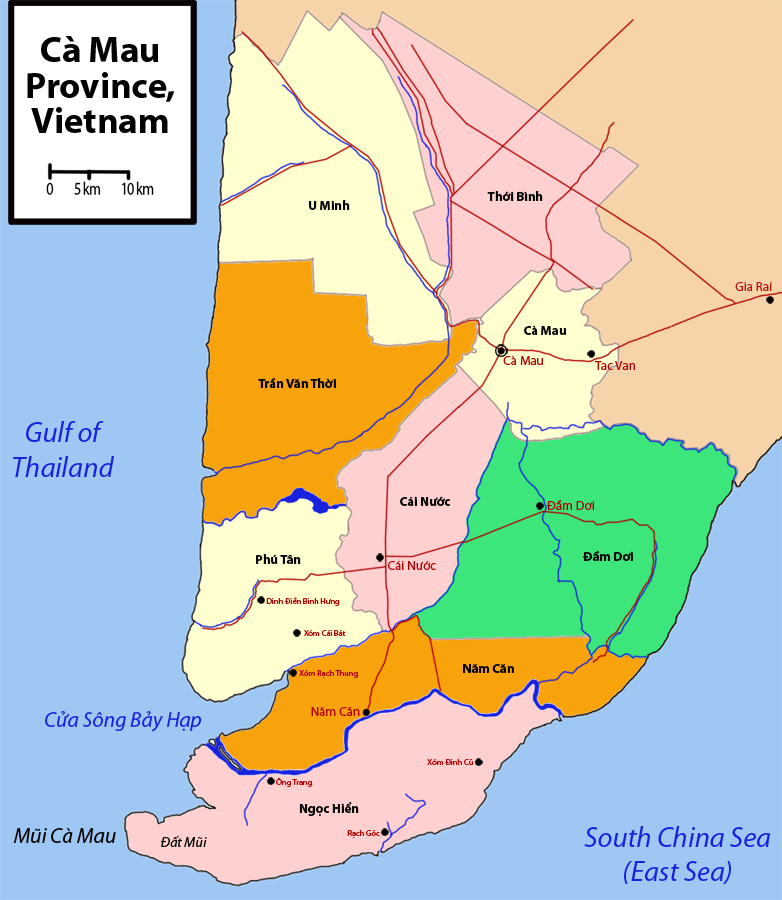
- Districts of Cà Mau province
- Country: Vietnam
- Province: Cà Mau
- Capital: Thới Bình

Area
  - District: 244 sq mi (631 km^{2})

Population (2019 census)
  - District: 135,892
  - Density: 558/sq mi (215/km^{2})
  - Urban: 10,032
- Time zone: UTC+07:00 (Indochina Time)

Thới Bình is a former rural district of Cà Mau province in the Mekong Delta region of Vietnam. As of 2019 the district had a population of 135,892. The district covers an area of 631 km^{2}. The district capital lies at Thới Bình. Thới Bình borders U Minh district to the west, Kiên Giang province to the north, Bạc Liêu province to the east and northeast, and Cà Mau to the south.

As a district in the Cà Mau Peninsula and Mekong Delta, Thới Bình is typical of the area, with low-lying and salty floodplains. Part of the district lies in the U Minh Thượng National Park. The main economic activity in the district is aquaculture, particularly prawn and blue crab farming. Trẹm River, a tributary of the Ông Đốc River, is the only waterway flowing through this district.

== Divisions ==
Before 2025, the district is subdivided into 12 commune-level subdivisions, including the township of Thới Bình and the rural communes of Biển Bạch, Biển Bạch Đông, Hồ Thị Kỷ, Tân Bằng, Tân Lộc, Tân Lộc Bắc, Tân Lộc Đông, Tân Phú, Trí Lực and Trí Phải.

In 2025, the Area was rearranged into 5 communes: Bien Bach, Tri Phai, Thoi Binh, Ho Thi Ky, Tan Loc.
