= Tân Lộc, Cà Mau =

Tân Lộc
- Commune and village
- Interactive map of Tân Lộc
- Country: Vietnam
- Province: Cà Mau
- District: Thới Bình
- Time zone: UTC+07:00

Tân Lộc is a commune (xã) and village in Thới Bình district, Cà Mau province, in Vietnam.
