= U Minh district =

Coordinates: 9.417°N 104.917°E

U Minh district Huyện U Minh
- District
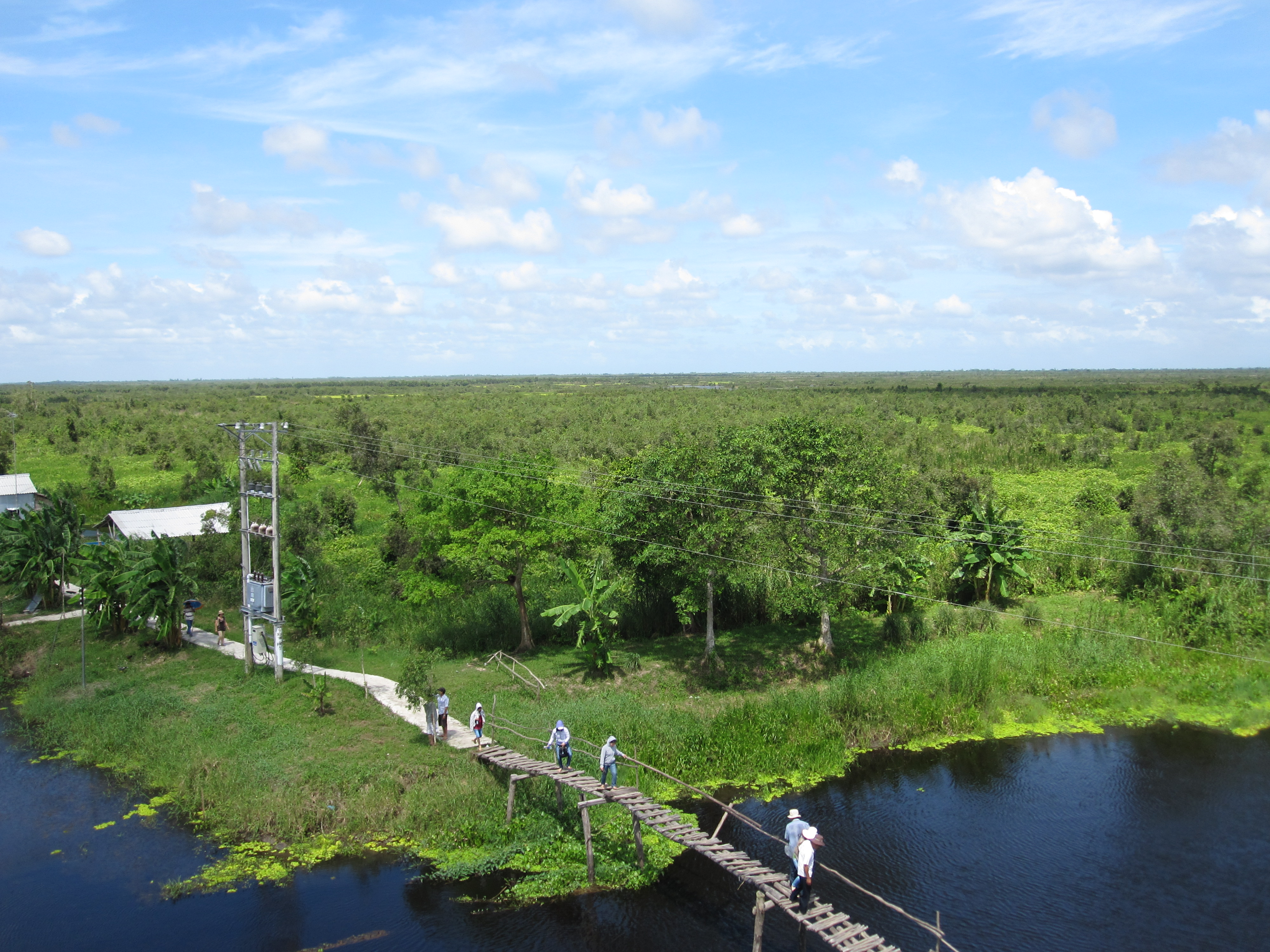
- U Minh forest.

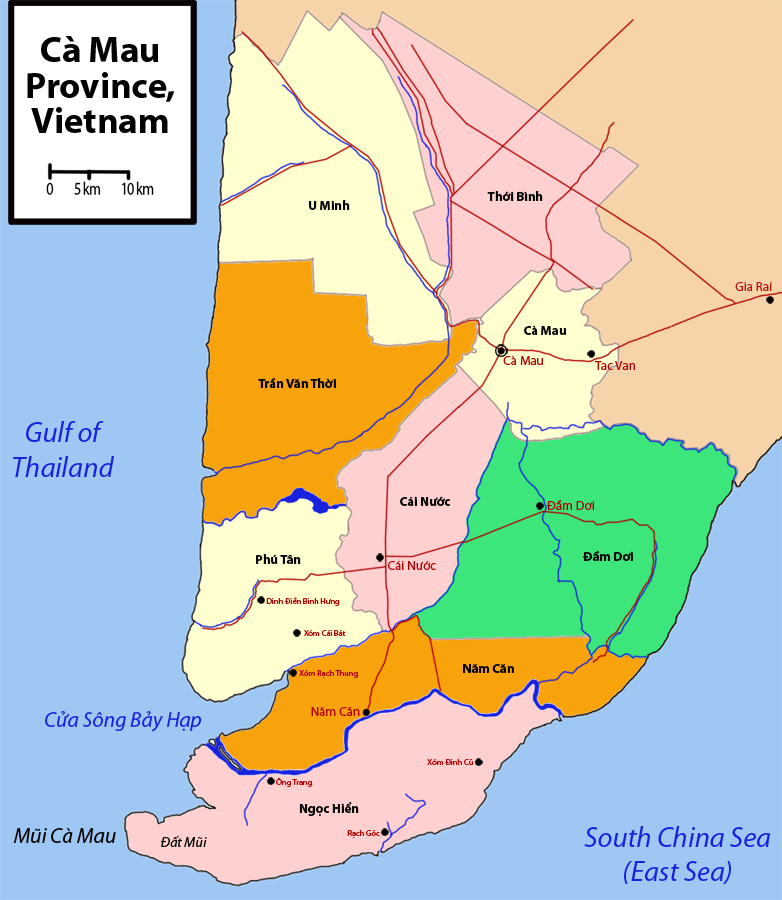
- Districts of Cà Mau province
- Country: Vietnam
- Province: Cà Mau
- Capital: U Minh

Area
  - District: 295 sq mi (764 km^{2})

Population (2019 census)
  - District: 100,876
  - Density: 342/sq mi (132/km^{2})
  - Urban: 7,106
  - Rural: 93,770
- Time zone: UTC+07:00 (Indochina Time)

U Minh is a former rural district (huyện) of Cà Mau province in the Mekong Delta region of Vietnam. As of 2019, the district had a population of 100,876. The district covers an area of 764 square kilometres (295 sq mi). The district capital lies at U Minh.

It is located on Vietnam's western coast on the Cà Mau Peninsula, abutting the Gulf of Thailand. It is bordered by the districts of U Minh Thượng district to the north in Kiên Giang province, Trần Văn Thời to the south and Thới Bình to the east.

The terrain is mostly flat, salty floodplains.

== Divisions ==
Before 2025, the district is subdivided into 8 commune-level subdivisions, including the township of U Minh and the rural communes of Nguyễn Phích, Khánh Hội, Khánh Hòa, Khánh Tiến, Khánh Thuận, Khánh Lâm and Khánh An.

In 2025, the Area was rearranged into 4 communes: U Minh, Nguyen Phich, Khanh Lam, Khanh An.
