= Khánh Lâm =

Coordinates: 9.3381°N 104.8819°E

- Commune and village
- Interactive map of Khánh Lâm
- Country: Vietnam
- Province: Cà Mau
- Time zone: UTC+07:00

Khánh Lâm is a commune (xã) and village in Cà Mau province, in Vietnam.

The Standing Committee of the National Assembly issued Resolution No. 1655/NQ-UBTVQH15 on the rearrangement of commune-level administrative units of Cà Mau Province in 2025 (the resolution takes effect from 16 June 2025). Accordingly, Khánh Lâm Commune was established in Cà Mau Province on the basis of the entire natural area of 35.10 km² and a population of 14,469 people of Khánh Hội Commune; the adjustment of 100.50 km² in natural area with a population of 16,325 people from the remaining part of Khánh Lâm Commune; and the adjustment of 72.60 km² in natural area with a population of 8,086 people from Nguyễn Phích Commune, all belonging to U Minh District.
