= Liberation Army of South Vietnam =

Armed forces of the Viet Cong

- Quân Giải phóng miền Nam Việt Nam
- Emblem
- Active: January 1961 – July 7, 1976
- Country: South Vietnam
- Allegiance: (Provisional Revolutionary Government of the Republic of South Vietnam) National Liberation Front
- Type: Irregular military Light infantry
- Role: Asymmetric warfare Guerilla warfare Unconventional warfare
- Size: 24,000 (1961); 64,000 (1963); 290,000 (1974)
- Part of: People's Army of Vietnam
- Nicknames: Viet Cong; The Liberators / Liberation Army
- Engagements: Vietnam War

Commanders
- Notable commanders: Trần Văn Trà; Hoàng Minh Thảo; Hoàng Đan; Nguyễn Hữu An; Nguyễn Thị Định; Lê Đức Anh

Insignia
- Military Flag

The Liberation Army of South Vietnam (LASV; Vietnamese: Quân Giải phóng miền Nam Việt Nam), also recognized as the Liberation Army (Quân Giải phóng - QGP or Giải phóng quân) and informally referred to by South Vietnam, the United States, and other anti-communist as the Viet Cong, was a military force combining irregular and regular units established as the nominal armed wing of the National Liberation Front of South Vietnam (or Viet Cong - VC) by the Communist Party of Vietnam in South Vietnam in 1961. It politically and ideologically operated as a part of the existing People's Army of Vietnam (PAVN) of North Vietnam, having its name cosmetically the only official organization of communist-aligned armed forces to fought in South Vietnam. In 1962, the People's Revolutionary Party of South Vietnam separated from the Communist Party of Vietnam in terms of external appearance, openly directing the Liberation Army's military. Politically, the LASV was under the direction of the VC and the Provisional Revolutionary Government of the Republic of South Vietnam. The military forces although collectively known as the Liberation Army of South Vietnam, still use the unit names, military badges and war flag of the PAVN.

After the 1973 Paris Peace Accords, the forces of the LASV were merged into the PAVN one by one. This merger was completed in 1975 and 1976. Although the LASV and the PAVN were nominally two different armies, they shared the same leadership and could completely merge, split, and supplement forces according to their needs. After 1975, the Communist Party of Vietnam acknowledged leading both LASV and the PAVN during the war. The National Front for the Liberation of South Vietnam and the Provisional Revolutionary Government of the Republic of South Vietnam also received the secret direction of the Communist Party of Vietnam. In 1976, with the official reunification of Vietnam, this army was dissolved.

The LASV was under the open direction of the High Command of the Armed Forces for the Liberation of South Vietnam, and secretly under the direction of the Politburo of Communist Party of Vietnam and the Central Military Commission of the PAVN, Central Department for South Vietnam, the High Command of the Armed Forces for the Liberation of South Vietnam. The Central Department for South Vietnam and the High Command of the Armed Forces for the Liberation of South Vietnam directed in the area B2 (Ninh Thuan to Ca Mau).

== Organization ==
A Certificate of Merit being issued by LASV to a Hanoi-born deputy squad leader in 1967. This paper would be seized by the US on an unknown occasion, before being returned by U.S. Defense Secretary Pete Hegseth to Vietnamese defence minister Phan Văn Giang in 2026.

According to 1954 Geneva agreements, the Viet Minh were not compulsorily removed to the North because it was a political entity, not a military force. Hanoi support for the Viet Minh to establish the NLF forces was allowed on the basis that it remained a militia in the South. The LASV was recognized as the official force on February 15, 1961, by North Vietnam. The LASV originally carried out operations ostensibly to protect South Vietnamese citizens from offensives by the Republic of Vietnam and the United States. Most early soldiers in the LASV were South Vietnamese. However, casualties of war forced North Vietnam to provide volunteers for the LASV. The DRV and other Marxist–Leninist nations recognised the LASV as the primary militarily force in South Vietnam and considered the PAVN to be its parent organization.

Command mechanism:

Public:

The National Front for the Liberation of South Vietnam and the Provisional Revolutionary Government led politically

The People's Revolutionary Party of South Vietnam and the Regional Command command military affairs throughout the South

Secret:

The Politburo and Central Military Commission of the Labor Party of Vietnam, the General Command of the Vietnam People's Army direct the entire South, directly on the battlefields B1, B3, B4, B5.

The Central Department of the South, the Military Commission of the South, the Command of the Region on the battlefield B2, under the general direction of the Labor Party of Vietnam

The Politburo, the Secretariat of the Labor Party and directly the Central Department of the South of the Labor Party secretly directed the National Front for Liberation and the Provisional Revolutionary Government.

After the reunification of Vietnam in 1975, the Liberation Army of South Vietnam was merged into the People's Army of Vietnam in 1976. In fact, all the Viet Cong army forces had been incorporated into the North Vietnamese army since early 1975.

== Developments ==
In January 1961, the militia in South Vietnam became the official force there. On February 15, 1961, North Vietnam recognized it as the main battle force in South Vietnam. At the end of 1961, there were 24,500 soldiers and 100,000 militants in the LASV. The LASV had 11 battalions, with commanding generals Trần Văn Trà, Hoàng Văn Thái, Lê Trọng Tấn, Lê Đức Anh, Nguyễn Thị Định, and others.

The LASV initially confined its operations to rural areas due to Ngô Đình Diệm's tough crackdown on Communist sympathizers. However, the number of soldiers still went up to 64,000 in 1963. As the result, regiments were established. From 1964, North Vietnam started providing soldiers for the LASV through volunteers. The number of the LASV soldiers reached over 290,000 in December 1974, including 90,000 from the South.

The South Vietnamese and United States forces outnumbered the PAVN by at least 7 to 1 until 1965; even after 1965 the coalition forces still outnumbered the PAVN by 3 to 1.

The LASV also included urban fighting forces, especially in Saigon. These forces had mission of carrying out cover attacks against South Vietnam and American forces and its allies in urban areas, especially in Saigon. The urban special force in Saigon is famous in the 1968 Tet offensive.

=== Main units ===
- 7th Division established in 1966 in South Vietnam, on the basis of the two Regiments 141 and 165 of the old 312th Division in the North. After that, the formation had many other regiments marching southwards, subordinated to the division. Regiment: 16th Regiment (101st Regiment, 325th Division), 14th Regiment (18th Regiment, 325th Division), 209th Regiment (312th Division), 95C Regiment (9th Division). In 1974, The group was in the 4th Army Corps (B2).
- 9th Division established in 1965 in South Vietnam, on the basis of two regiments Q761 and Q762. Soldiers in the formation of the division consisted of all three regions, the largest number of which were Southerners who had participated in Dong Khoi. In 1974, the division was in the 4th Army Corps (B2). In 1975 the division was in Division 232 for some time.
- 5th Division established in 1965 in South Vietnam from two regiments Q.764 (E4) and Q.765 (E55), in 1975 was part of Division 232 for a period of time, participating in the Ho Chi Minh campaign, wing west-south, then to Military Region 7.
- 3rd Division established in 1965 under the 5th Military Region, consisting of the 2nd Regiment (an "original Viet Cong" regiment completely recruited from the local), the 12th Regiment (former the 18th Regiment of the 325th Division with the traditional tradition from the Indochina War. February 1965, regiment departed for the battlefield), 22nd Regiment, 21st Regiment
- 2nd Division was established in 1965 in the 5th Military Region, on the basis of the 1st regiment in Quang Nam, Quang Ngai, the 21st regiment of the North and the addition of the 70th infantry battalion...In 1975, it belonged to the 3rd Army Corps. When the 3rd Army Corps marched to the South, the 2nd Division stayed in the 5th Military Region.
- The 3rd Division belongs to the Regional Command (B2) (also called Phuoc Long division or 303 division, in Legion 232)
- The 4th Division belongs to the 9th Military Region
- the 8th Division belongs to the 8th Military Region, established 22 October 1974...
- The 812th Infantry Regiment was established in 1950, formerly known as 120 Company, local army zone 6, developed into the main 840 battalion of Military Region 6, operating mainly on the southernmost battlefield of Central Vietnam. After the Geneva agreement was signed, the 840th battalion was ordered to assemble to the North. In 1974, the 6th Military Region Command decided to establish the 812th Infantry Regiment.
- Gia Dinh Regiment was established in 1959 in South Vietnam. On April 1, 1975, the unit was officially named Gia Dinh Regiment.
- The 88th Infantry Regiment was established in 1949 in North Vietnam and split in 1965 into Regiment 88B and Regiment 88A. Regiment 88A was assigned to the South. In March 1975, the Regiment separated from the 8th Military Region to consolidate its forces, participating in the Ho Chi Minh campaign as the 5th wing of the 232nd division. After that, the 88th Regiment belonged to the 302nd Division, the 7th Military Region.
- The 6th Infantry Regiment belongs to the Tri - Thien Military Region, established 1965

== Equipment ==
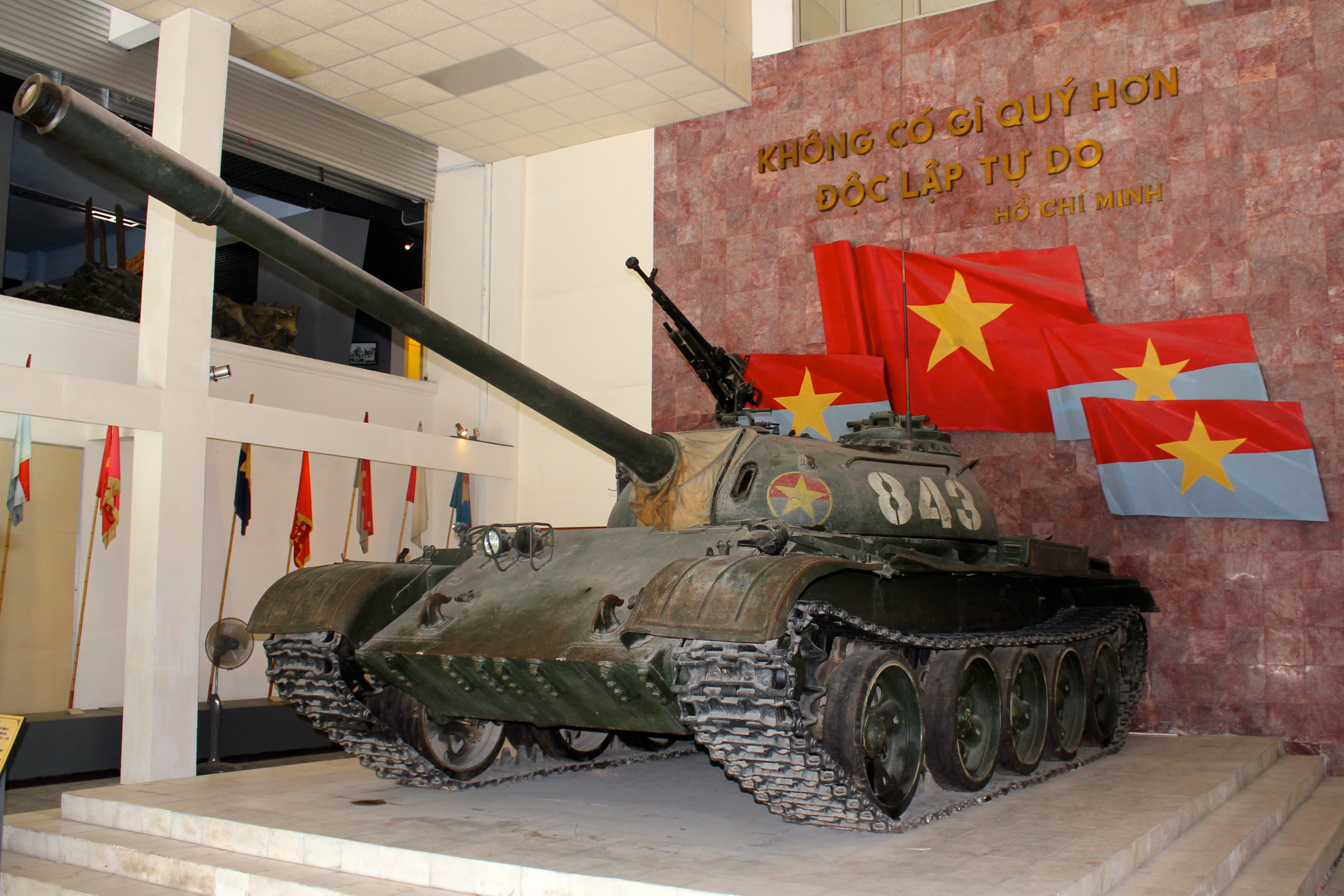
A T-54B MBT being exhibited in LASV colors and identification. It was practically operated by the Northern headquarters PAVN; however, PAVN conducted most military operations in the Southern territories under the LASV name.

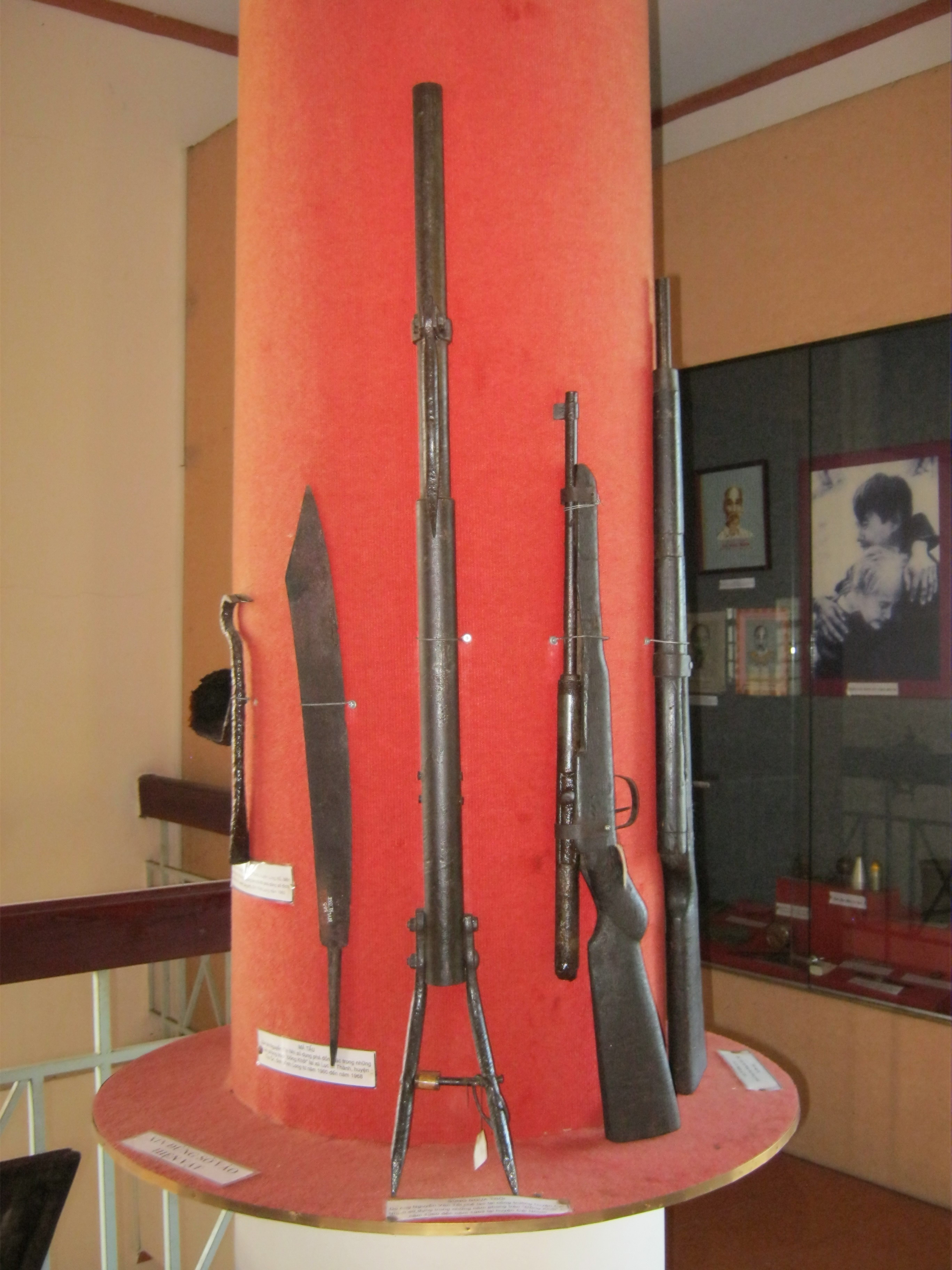
A selection of weaponry in NLF service

The Viet Minh established the NLF and LASV in order to help reunified Vietnam. PAVN forces that went to the South were sent with the express mission to aid the NLF/LASV. The LASV had different uniforms, flags and badges to those of the PAVN.

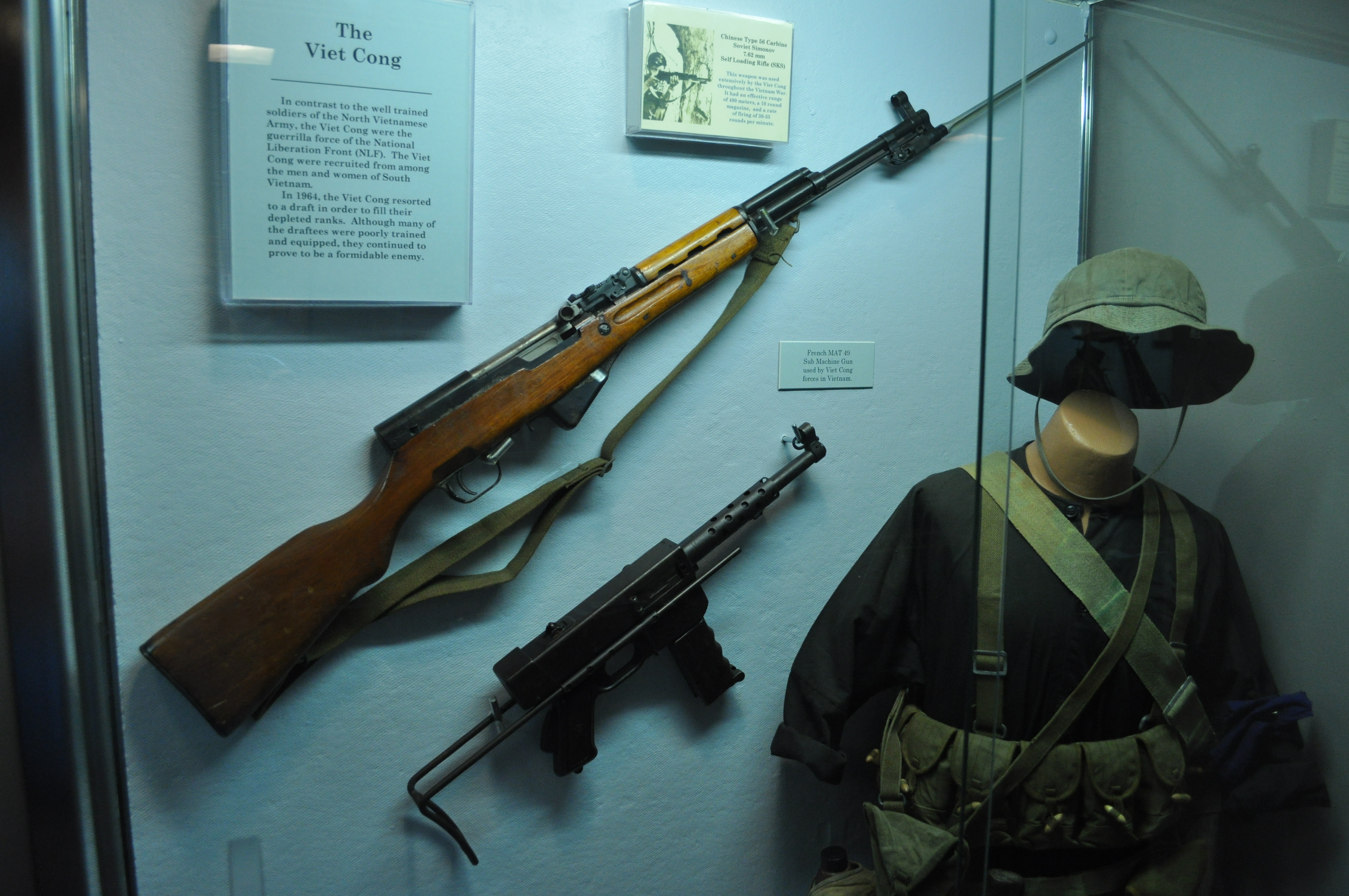
Uniform and personal arms of an NLF guerrilla

=== Small arms ===
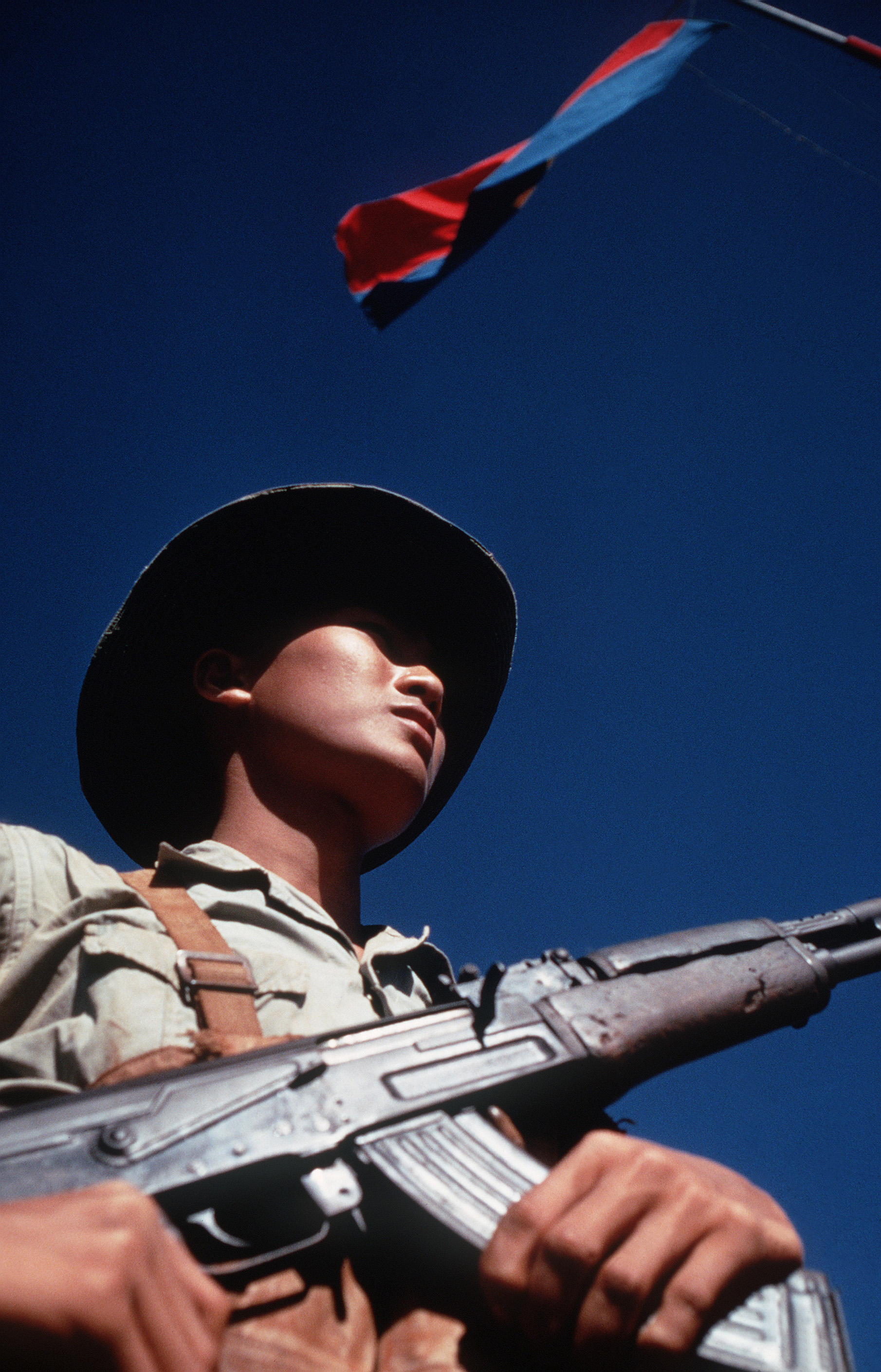
A Liberation Army of South Vietnam (LASV) soldier carrying his AK-47 rifle, standing beneath an NLF flag.

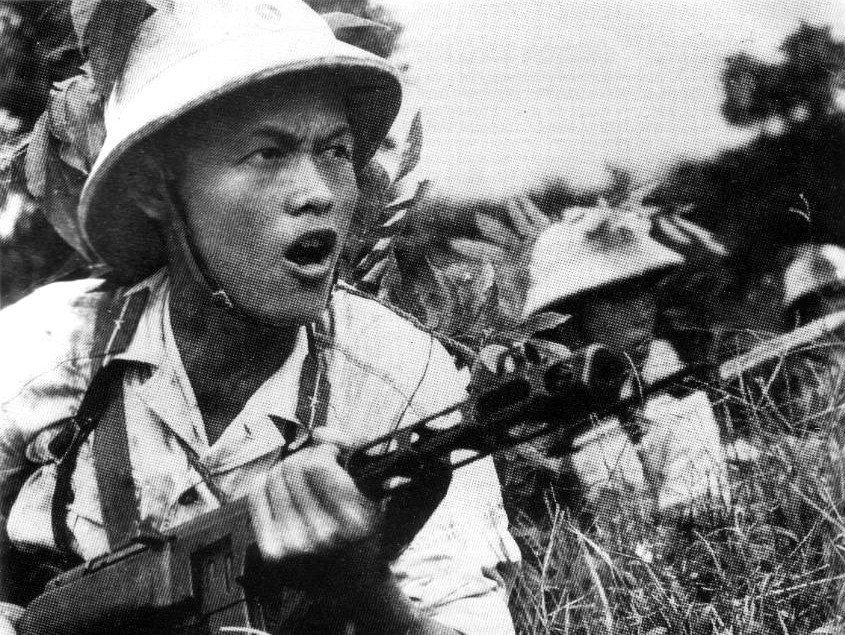
Viet Minh troops with PPSh-41

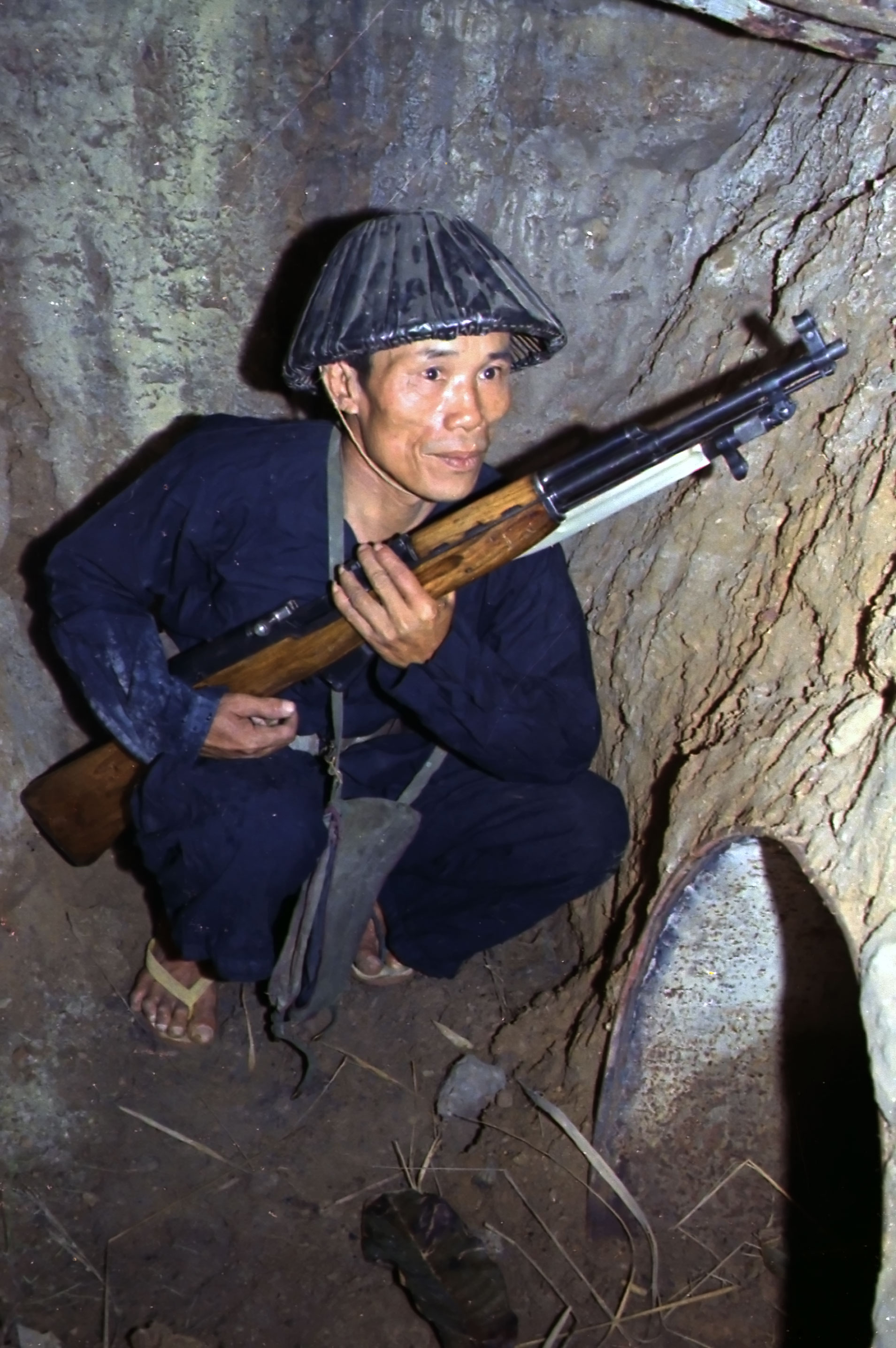
Liberation Army of South Vietnam (LASV) soldier, armed with SKS rifle

==== Handguns ====
- Tokarev TT-33 – Soviet-designed single-action 7.62×25mm semi-automatic pistol. More commonly used were the Chinese variants of the T33, known as the Type-51 and Type-54. Carried by PAVN and Viet-Cong officers, it accepted an 8-round single stack box magazine.
- Makarov PM – Soviet-designed double/single-action 9×18mm Makarov (9.5×18mm) semi-automatic pistol. Reproduced in China as the Type-59, this small and reliable pistol became the standard sidearm of communist forces in Europe and Asia. Utilizing a simple blow-back action, this self-loading pistol fed from an 8-round single stack box magazine.
- P-64 CZAK handgun
- Nagant M1895 revolver
- Mauser C96 (from the Soviet Union)
- M1911 handgun
- Walther P38 (from the Soviet Union)
- CZ 27
- Browning Hi-power
- Home-made pistols, such as copies of the M1911, Luger or of the Mauser C96 (Cao Dai 763) or crude one-shot guns, were also used by the Viet Cong early in the war.

==== Automatic and semi-automatic rifles ====
- AK-47 and AKM assault rifles (from the Soviet Union and Warsaw Pact countries)
- Type 56 assault rifle (from the People's Republic of China)
- Vz. 58 assault rifle (from Czechoslovakia)
- Type 63 assault rifle
- Kbkg wz. 1960 (from the Poland)
- Sturmgewehr 44 assault rifle (captured by the Soviets during World War II and provided to the PAVN and the LASV as military aid)
- SVD-63 Very limited use semi-automatic marksman rifle, also known as the "Dragunov" sniper rifle
- MAS-49 rifle Captured French rifle from first Indochina War, used by PAVN throughout the 1950s and up to the mid-1960s
- M16A1, M14 American assault rifle captured from U.S. and ARVN forces.
- SKS semi-automatic carbine, also known as Simonov
- M1 Garand
- M1/M2 Carbine
- Home-made rifles, often spring-action rifles made to look like a M1 Garand or a M1 Carbine, were also used by the Viet Cong.

==== Bolt-action rifles ====
- MAS-36 rifle Captured French rifle from first Indochina War, used by PAVN in earlier stages of the Vietnam War
- Mosin–Nagant bolt-action rifles and carbines (from the Soviet Union, Warsaw Pact countries, and the People's Republic of China)
- Mauser Kar98k bolt-action rifle (many of the Mausers used by the PAVN and the LASV were from rifles captured from the French during the First Indochina War and rifles provided to them by the Soviets as military aid)
- Type 99 Rifle captured from the Japanese during World War II
- M1917 Enfield USA bolt-action rifles
- Berthier Captured French rifle from first Indochina War, used by Vietcong in earlier stages of the Vietnam War
- Vz. 24 bolt-action rifles from the Czechoslovakia
- Type 24 bolt-action rifles from the Chinese
- Lebel Captured French rifle from first Indochina War, used by PAVN in earlier stages of the Vietnam War
- Older or rarer rifles were often modified by the Viet Cong early in the war: Gras mle 1874 carbines were rechambered to .410 bore while Destroyer carbines were modified to accept the magazine of the Walther P38.
- Homemade shotguns, some inspired by the BAR or the Arisaka Type 99, were used by the Viet Cong early in the war.

==== Submachine guns ====
- K-50M submachine gun (Vietnamese edition, based on Chinese version of Russian PPSh-41, produced under license)
- Škorpion vz. 61 submachine gun from Czechoslovakia
- M3/M3A1 and Type 36/37 submachine gun from USA, and supplied from Chinese
- Thompson submachine gun from USA
- PPSh-41 submachine gun (both Soviet and Chinese versions)
- MP-40 German sub machine captured during World War II by the Soviet Army, supplied to the Viet Cong in limited amounts
- MAT-49 submachine gun – Captured from the French by the North Vietnamese, many were converted to 7.62×25mm.
- PM-63 Polish submachine gun
- MP-38 submachine gun (captured by the Soviets during World War II; provided to the PAVN and the NLF as military aid)
- PPS-43 Russian submachine gun
- Sten England submachine gun
- Type 100 (use from Indochina war)

==== Machine guns ====
- Type 99 LMG
- RPD light machine gun
- Degtyarev DP light machine gun
- SG-43/SGM medium machine guns (including Chinese copies)
- RPK light machine gun
- ZB-26 light machine gun
- FM 24/29 light machine gun
- PK machine gun Very limited use.
- MG-34 light machine gun (captured by the Soviets during World War II; provided to the PAVN and the NLF as military aid)
- MG-42 medium machine gun (captured by the Soviets during World War II; provided to the PAVN and the NLF as military aid)
- Uk vz. 59 general-purpose machine gun
- Madsen LMG
- DShK heavy machine gun
- Browning M1917 heavy machine gun
- PM M1910 heavy machine gun

==== Grenades and other explosives ====
- F1 grenade
- Type 67 stick grenade
- RG-42 grenade
- RGD-5 grenade
- 9K32 Strela-2 anti-aircraft weapon
- RPG-2 anti-tank weapon (both Soviet and locally produced B-40 and B-50 variants used)
- RPG-7 anti-tank weapon
- Type 69 RPG anti-tank weapon
- PTRD-41

==== Flamethrowers ====
- LPO-50 flamethrower (limited use)

=== Artillery ===
- ZPU-4 quad 14.5 mm anti-aircraft machine gun
- ZU-23 twin 23 mm anti-aircraft cannon
- M1939 37 mm anti-aircraft gun
- S-60 57 mm anti-aircraft gun
- 85 mm air defense gun M1939 (52-K)
- 100 mm air defense gun KS-19

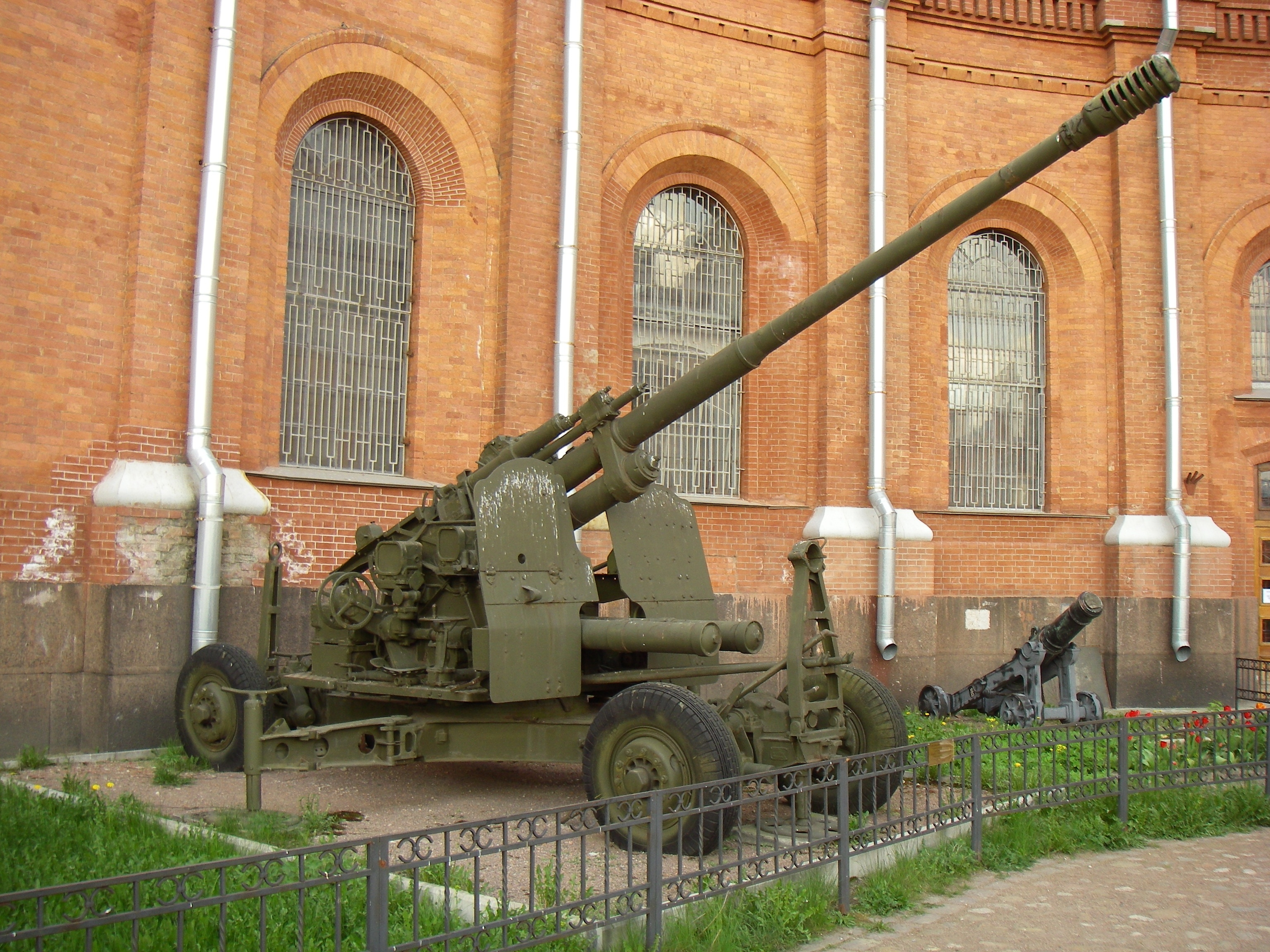
KS-19 air defense gun

- 82-PM-41 82 mm mortar
- 107 mm M1938 mortar
- M1938 120 mm mortar
- M1943 160 mm mortar
- Type 63 107 mm rocket launcher
- BM-21 Grad 122 mm rocket launcher
- 122 mm Katyusha rockets
- BM-25 (MRL) limited numbers
- 122 mm gun M1931/37 (A-19)
- 122 mm howitzer M1938 (M-30)
- D-74 122 mm field gun
- 130 mm towed field gun M1954 (M-46)
- 152 mm howitzer M1943 (D-1)
- 152 mm towed gun-howitzer M1955 (D-20)

=== Aircraft weapons ===
- Gryazev-Shipunov GSh-23
- Nudelman-Rikhter NR-30
- Nudelman N-37
- Nudelman-Rikhter NR-23

== Activities ==
There are few traits to distinguish between LASV and PAVN forces. Over half of LASV and PAVN soldiers were members of the Communist Party of Vietnam. However, LASV and PAVN forces nominally used different flags and emblems. PAVN troops carried the North Vietnamese flag, while LASV troops carried the Viet Cong flag.

Flag of the National Liberation Front of South Vietnam

== List of military victories ==
- Battle of Ap Bac - 2 January 1963
- Battle of Hiep Hoa - 22 November 1963
- Attack on USNS Card - May 2, 1964
- Battle of An Lão - December 7–9, 1964
- Battle of Binh Gia - December 28, 1964 - January 1, 1965
- Attack on Camp Holloway
- Battle of Ba Gia
- Battle of Dong Xoai
- Battle of Gang Toi
- Battle of Xa Cam My
- Attack on the SS Baton Rouge Victory
- Battle of Ong Thanh
- Attack on Cu Chi Base Camp
- Battle of Khe Sanh
- Operation Lam Son 719

== Significant leaders ==
=== Commanders ===
No.	Name (alias)	Period	others position
1	Trần Văn Quang (Bảy Tiến)	1961–1963	Tư lệnh kiêm Chính ủy Quân khu Trị – Thiên (1966–1973)
2	Trần Văn Trà (Tư Chi)	1963–1967	Phó Bí thư Quân ủy, Phó tư lệnh Miền (1968–1972)
3	Hoàng Văn Thái (Mười Khang)	1967–1973	Phó Bí thư Quân ủy (1967–1973), Tư lệnh kiêm Chính ủy Quân khu 5 (1966–1967)
4	Trần Văn Trà (Tư Chi)	1973–1975	Phó Bí thư Quân ủy, Phó tư lệnh Miền (1968–1972)

=== Political Commissars ===
No.	Name (alias)	Period	others position
1	Phạm Thái Bường (Ba Bường)	1961–1962	Bí thư Khu ủy 9 (1969–1974), Ủy viên thường vụ Trung ương Cục miền Nam (1965–1974)
2	Trần Nam Trung (Hai Hậu)	1962–1964	Ủy viên Quốc phòng Mặt trận Dân tộc Giải phóng miền Nam (1961–1976); Bộ trưởng Quốc phòng Chính phủ Cách mạng lâm thời Cộng hòa Miền Nam Việt Nam (1969–1976)
3	Nguyễn Chí Thanh (Sáu Di)	1964–1967	Bí thư Trung ương Cục miền Nam (1964–1967)
4	Phạm Hùng (Hai Hùng)	1967–1975	Bí thư Trung ương Cục miền Nam (1967–1975)

=== Chiefs of Staff ===
No.	Name (alias)	Period	others position
2	Lê Đức Anh (Sáu Nam)	1964–1969	Phó Tư lệnh Miền (1964–1969, 1974–1975), Tư lệnh Quân khu 9 (1969–1974)
3	Nguyễn Minh Châu (Năm Ngà)	1969–1970	Tư lệnh Quân khu 6 (1963–1969), Tham mưu phó Miền (1970–1974)
4	Hoàng Cầm (Năm Thạch)	1970–1974	Tư lệnh Công trường 9
5	Nguyễn Minh Châu (Năm Ngà)	1974–1975	Tư lệnh Quân khu 6 (1963–1969), Tham mưu phó Miền (1970–1974)

=== Other leaders ===
No.	Name (alias)	Position
1	Nguyễn Thị Định (Ba Định)	Deputy chief of commander (1965–1975)
2	Đồng Văn Cống (Bảy Cống)	Tư lệnh Quân khu 3 (1964–1968); Phó tư lệnh Miền (1965–1972); Tư lệnh Quân khu 1 (1972–1975)
3	Nguyễn Hữu Xuyến (Tám Kiến Quốc)	Phó tư lệnh Miền (1965–1974)
4	Lê Trọng Tấn (Ba Long)	Phó tư lệnh Miền (1965–1971)
5	Trần Độ (Chín Vinh)	Phó chính ủy Miền (1965–1974)
6	Trần Quý Hai	Tư lệnh B5 (1968, 1971–1972)
6	Lê Quang Đạo	Chính ủy B5 (1968, 1971–1972)
7	Chu Huy Mân	Tư lệnh Quân khu 5 (1967–1975)
8	Lê Văn Tưởng (Hai Chân)	Chủ nhiệm Chính trị Miền (1961–1965, 1967–1975), Chính ủy Công trường 9 (1965–1967), Phó chính ủy Miền (1972–1975)
9	Trần Văn Nghiêm (Hai Nghiêm)	Tham mưu phó Miền (1965–1975)
10	Đàm Văn Ngụy	Tư lệnh Công trường 7 (1972–1973)
11	Nguyễn Hòa	Phó tư lệnh B5 (1967–1968), Tư lệnhCông trường 5 (1965–1966), Công trường 7 (1966–1967)
11	Dương Cự Tẩm	Cục phó Chính trị Miền (1964–1966), Chính ủy Công trường 7 (1966–1967), Phó chính ủy Quân khu 3 (1968–1969), Chính ủy Quân khu 2 (1969–1974), Chính ủy Quân khu 7 (1974)
12	Lê Tự Đồng	Chính ủy B5 (1969–1972), Chính ủy Quân khu Trị Thiên (1972–1975), Tư lệnh Quân khu Trị Thiên (1974–1975)
12	Đoàn Khuê	Phó chính ủy Quân khu 5 (1963–1975)
12	Trần Văn Phác (Tám Trần)	Chủ nhiệm Chính trị Bộ tư lệnh miền
13	Bùi Phùng	Chủ nhiệm Hậu cần Bộ tư lệnh Miền
14	Nguyễn Thành Thơ (Mười Khẩn)	Tư lệnh Quân khu 3 (1961–1964)
15	Nguyễn Văn Bé (Tám Tùng)	Chính ủy Quân khu 3
16	Nguyễn Đôn	Tư lệnh Quân khu 5 (1961–1967)

== Battle forces ==
If a LASV unit has the same name with a PAVN unit, the LASV name will have the letter "B" added after the unit number.

- Tây Nguyên Corps (Main battle force in Central Highlands area)
- Cửu Long Corps (Main battle force in Mekong Delta area)
- Division 1 (Main battle force in Central Highlands area)
- Division 2 (Main battle force in South Central Coast area) aka Quảng Đà Division or Steel Division
- Division 3 (Main battle force in South Central Coast area) aka Sao Vàng (Yellow Star) Division
- Division 4 (Main battle force in the South)
- Division 5 (Main battle force in Mekong Delta area)
- Division 6 (Main battle force in Southeastern area)
- Division 7 (Main battle force in the South)
- Division 8 (Main battle force in Mekong Delta area)
- Division 9 (Main battle force in the South)
- Division 10 (Main battle force in Central Highlands area)
- Division 31
- Division 303 (Main battle force in the South)
- Division 304B (Viet Cong)
- Division 308B (Viet Cong)
- Division 324B (Viet Cong)
- Division 325 (Main battle force in Central Highlands area)
- Special forces Division 100 (Viet Cong)
- Special forces Division 305
