= Colonel general (Vietnam) =

Colonel general Thượng tướng
- Three-star insignia of the rank of Colonel general (Ground Force)

- Three-star insignia of the rank of Colonel general (Air Force)
- Country: Vietnam
- Service branch: Vietnam People's Ground Force; Vietnam People's Air Force
- Rank group: General officer
- Rank: Three-star
- NATO rank code: OF-9
- Formation: 1958
- Next higher rank: Army general
- Next lower rank: Lieutenant general
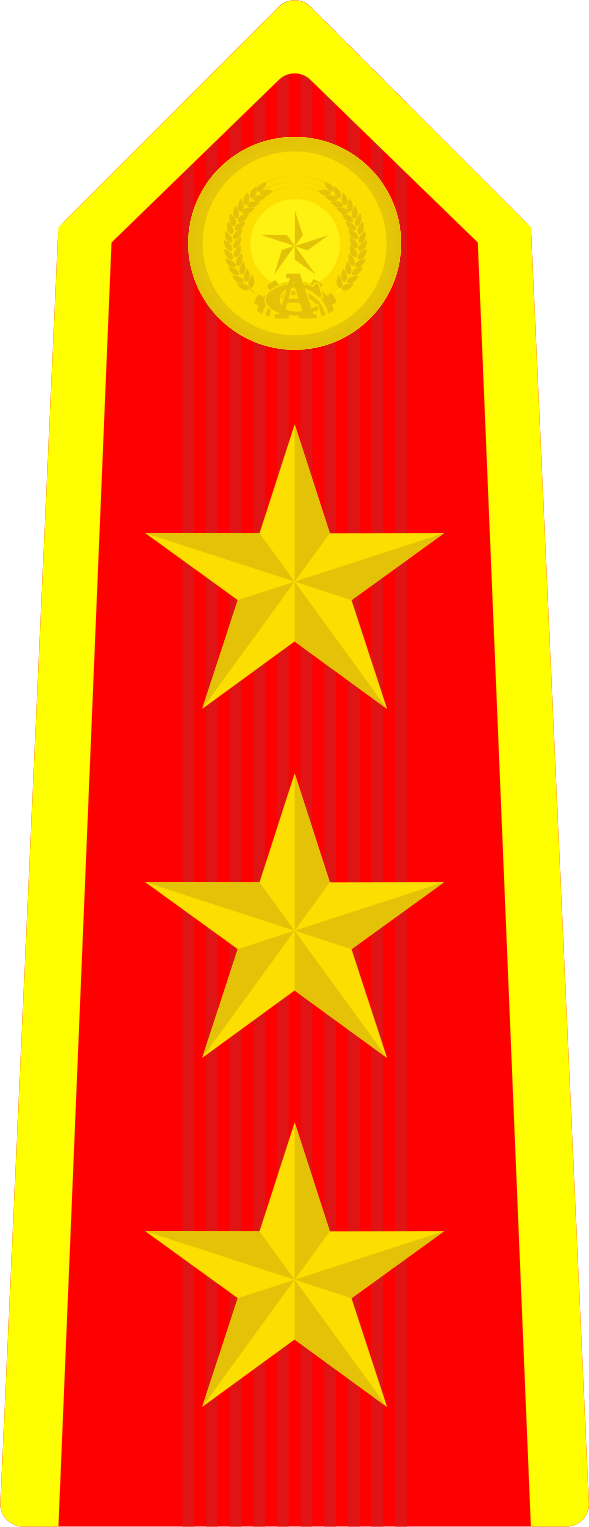
- Equivalent ranks: Admiral Colonel general

Colonel general (Vietnamese: Thượng tướng) is a high-ranking general, holding the second highest officer rank in the Vietnam People's Army Military Rank system with the insignia of 3 gold stars.

According to the current regulations in Article 88 of the 2013 Vietnamese Constitution, general officer ranks (including the ranks of Colonel general and Admiral) are awarded by the President and Chairman of the National Defense and Security Council.

The military rank of Colonel general (in the Navy, also known as Admiral of the Vietnam People's Navy) is only conferred on high-ranking generals holding the following positions: Deputy Minister of National Defense, Chief of the General Staff, Director of the General Political Department, Deputy Chief of the General Staff, deputy director of the General Political Department, Director of the National Defense Academy, Political Commissar of the National Defense Academy, Deputy Minister of National Defense cum Commander of the Navy, and Chairman of the National Assembly's National Defense and Security Committee.

== History of formation ==
- The rank of Colonel general was first defined as the rank between General and Colonel general (previously these two ranks were adjacent to each other) with the Law Regulating the Service Regime of Officers of the Vietnam People's Army dated May 31, 1958. According to Decree 307-TTg dated June 20, 1958, it was stipulated that the rank of Colonel general carries 3 yellow stars on the insignia.
- On August 31, 1959, the first two soldiers to be awarded this military rank (promoted from Major General in 1948, without going through intermediate ranks) were Chief of General Staff of the Vietnam People's Army Van Tien Dung (later promoted to General) and Political Commissar of the Viet Bac Military Region Chu Van Tan.
- From December 30, 1981, the military rank of Colonel general of the Navy was defined as Navy Admiral with the Law on Officers of the Vietnam People's Army. Since then, only two soldiers have been awarded this rank: Giap Van Cuong (conferred in 1988) and Nguyen Van Hien (conferred in 2011).
- As of March 2023, the Vietnam People's Army had 67 officers promoted to the rank of Colonel general and Admiral (not counting officers promoted to Army general).
- The military rank of Colonel general is conferred on high-ranking generals holding the following positions: Deputy Minister of National Defense, Chief of the General Staff, Director of the General Political Department, Deputy Chief of the General Staff, deputy director of the General Political Department, Director of the National Defense Academy, Political Commissar of the National Defense Academy.
- The military rank of Admiral is conferred on high-ranking generals holding the following positions: Commander of the Navy

However, there have been some exceptions such as General Đoàn Khuê being promoted to Colonel general in 1986 (later promoted to Army general) while serving as Deputy Commander - Chief of Staff of the Vietnamese Volunteer Army in Cambodia or General Vu Lang being promoted to Senior Colonel general while serving as Director of the Army Academy,...

- For the positions of General Director, Political Commissar of the General Department, Commander, Political Commissar of the Air Defense - Air Force, Commander, Political Commissar of the Border Guard, Commander, and Political Commissar of the Coast Guard, no soldier has ever been awarded the rank of Colonel general. In some cases, generals from the Navy, Air Defense and Air Force were promoted to Colonel general when they were no longer working in the military.
- In principle, the Senior General of the Vietnam People's Army is ranked equivalent to the level of Army Group Commander (General) in the armies of other countries.
Military rank of Colonel general of the Vietnam People's Army today

Military rank of Colonel general of the Vietnam People's Ground Force

Military rank of Colonel general of the Vietnam People's Air Force

Military rank of Admiral of the Vietnam People's Navy

== See also ==
- Vietnamese military ranks and insignia
