= Đỗ Bá Tỵ =

Vietnamese general and politician (born 1954)

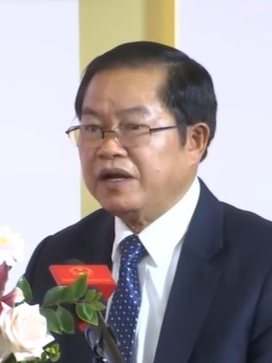
- Đỗ in January 2021
- Born: 1 December 1954 (age 71); Tân Lập commune, Đan Phượng district, Hanoi, North Vietnam
- Occupations: Soldier; politician
- Political party: CPV

Vice-chairman of the National Assembly of the Socialist Republic of Vietnam
- President: Trần Đại Quang
- Prime Minister: Nguyễn Xuân Phúc

Member of the 11th Central Committee of the Communist Party of Vietnam
- President: Trương Tấn Sang
- Prime Minister: Nguyễn Tấn Dũng
- Military career
- Service: People's Army of Vietnam
- Rank: Army general
- Commands: Chief of Staff

Đỗ Bá Tỵ (born 1 December 1954) is a Vietnamese army general in the People's Army of Vietnam and Vietnamese politician.

== Personal life ==
On 1 December 1954, Đỗ Bá Tỵ was born in Tân Lập commune, Đan Phượng district, Hanoi, North Vietnam.

== Military ==
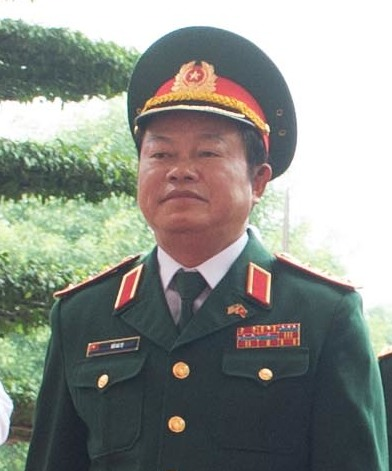
Then-Lt. Gen. Đỗ (14 August 2014)

Lieutenant General Đỗ Bá Tỵ was the Vietnamese Deputy Minister of Defense when, on 22 December 2010 with "Decision No. 2188 / QD-CTN", Phùng Quang Thanh awarded him the position of chief of the General Staff of the Vietnam People's Army. On 5 October 2015, President Trương Tấn Sang promoted Đỗ Bá Tỵ to army general.

== Politics ==
On 5 October 2015, General Đỗ Bá Tỵ was a member of the 11th Central Committee of the Communist Party of Vietnam. As of November 2017, Đỗ was the vice-chairman of the National Assembly of the Socialist Republic of Vietnam and president of the Vietnam-China parliamentary group.
