= Four nos policy =

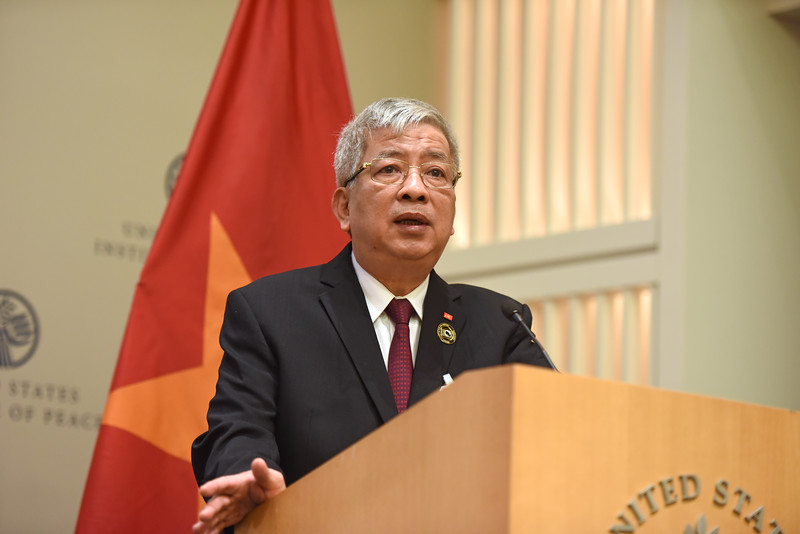
Nguyễn Chí Vịnh in 2019. He had significant contribution to the development of the "four nos" policy.

The "four nos" national defence policy (chính sách quốc phòng "bốn không"), also known as the "four nos and one depending" (bốn không và một tùy) or "four nos, one also and one depending" (bốn không, một đồng và một tùy) policy, is the common name for the defence policy and doctrine of the Socialist Republic of Vietnam. Formally nominated, defined and represented in various editions of the National Defence White Papers published by the Vietnam Ministry of National Defence, the "four nos" policy declares the country's commitment to non-alignment and independence in the context of military, politics, and foreign affairs, together with bamboo diplomacy strategically shaping the Vietnamese foreign policy doctrine.

The late Vietnamese Deputy Defense Minister and Colonel General Nguyễn Chí Vịnh (1959-2023) is widely credited to be the mastermind behind the development of the four nos policy. Official Vietnamese narratives actively avoid characterizing the policy as labelling Vietnam to be a neutral country, with Vịnh himself voiced again such misrepresentation, claiming that Vietnam is "independent" with flexibility, not "passive" neutrality.

Vietnamese: Vietnam is not neutral, Vietnam is independent. Being independent is utterly different from being neutral. We are independent on the basis of ethical principles, international law, and Vietnam’s interests...

[Việt Nam không trung lập, Việt Nam độc lập. Độc lập hoàn toàn khác với trung lập. Chúng ta độc lập trên cơ sở đạo lý, luật pháp quốc tế và lợi ích của Việt Nam...]

— Nguyễn Chí Vịnh,

== Content ==
According to the 2019 Vietnam National Defence White Paper, the so-called "four nos" are written as:

Viet Nam consistently advocates neither...

1. ...joining any military alliances;
  không tham gia liên minh quân sự;
2. ...siding with one country against another;
  không liên kết với nước này để chống nước kia;
3. ...giving any other countries permission to set up military bases or use its territory to carry out military activities against other countries;
  không cho nước ngoài đặt căn cứ quân sự hoặc sử dụng lãnh thổ Việt Nam để chống lại nước khác;
4. ...using force or threatening to use force in international relations.
  không sử dụng vũ lực hoặc đe dọa sử dụng vũ lực trong quan hệ quốc tế.

The fourth "no" (no using force or threatening to use force in international relations) is the latest addition to the policy, marking a transition from the previous "three nos" - which was firstly introduced in the 1998 white paper edition - to the current "four nos". After various wordings and representations, the Vietnamese four nos are currently been defined with two "supplementing clauses", colloquially known as the "one also" (một đồng) and "one depending" (một tùy), defining flexibility to the Vietnamese doctrine:

Viet Nam also promotes defence cooperation with countries to improve its capabilities to protect the country and address common security challenges. Depending on circumstances and specific conditions, Viet Nam will consider developing necessary, appropriate defence and military relations with other countries on the basis of respecting each other's independence, sovereignty, territorial unity and integrity as well as fundamental principles of international law, cooperation for mutual benefits and common interests of the region and international community.

Đồng thời, tăng cường hợp tác quốc phòng với các nước để nâng cao khả năng bảo vệ đất nước và giải quyết các thách thức an ninh chung. Tùy theo diễn biến của tình hình và trong những điều kiện cụ thể, Việt Nam sẽ cân nhắc phát triển các mối quan hệ quốc phòng, quân sự cần thiết với mức độ thích hợp trên cơ sở tôn trọng độc lập, chủ quyền, thống nhất và toàn vẹn lãnh thổ của nhau cũng như các nguyên tắc cơ bản của luật pháp quốc tế, hợp tác cùng có lợi, vì lợi ích chung của khu vực và cộng đồng quốc tế.

== Reception ==
Official narratives associated with the Government of Vietnam and Communist Party of Vietnam eventually praise the four-no, claiming that the Vietnamese policy is "of justice, peace and self-defence", "independent, self-reliant and multilateral", as well as not being "isolationist" or aligning with anyone to against anything, while also claim Vietnam's commitment to international laws, diplomacy and peaceful means to deal with disagreements as a doctrine for "proactive national defence" by preventing military conflicts. On the other hand, Vietnamese dissidents and anti-communists are usually critical of the four-no, claiming that it would restrict Vietnam's potential cooperation with the United States, which would have helped Vietnam in a hypothetical conflict of China, and other have criticized that the four-no definition was "overly redundant", with the first "three nos" could simply be defined as "no military alliance", while the fourth one was basically meaningless as "Vietnam would not dare to open fire when it's the weaker side". Vietnam has issued multiple articles and counter-arguments reasoning that those criticisms are misrepresentation and mischaracterization of the policy, as well as being conspiracies to weaken Vietnam's political stability and make Vietnam a proxy for geopolitical disputes.

Contradicting Vietnamese anti-government opinions, Naval War College Review rendered the four-no as to challenge Chinese expansionism in the region and was a good opportunity for the United States. It is said to mechanically balance the Vietnamese position between China and the United States, having both of them top-tier trade partners to Vietnam, while still retaining enough flexibility for Vietnam if the situation would be changed. On the other hand, RAND interprets the policy to be Vietnam's unwillingness to forge deeper cooperation with the United States, which would antagonize Beijing in exchange.

== Four avoidings ==
Besides the primary "four nos" guidelines, Communist Party of Vietnam's ideologues also developed a supplementing "four avoidings" (bốn tránh) framework:

Vietnam advocates to:

1. Avoiding military conflicts
  Tránh xung đột về quân sự
2. Avoiding economic isolation
  Tránh bị cô lập về kinh tế
3. Avoiding diplomatic isolation
  Tránh bị cô lập về ngoại giao
4. Avoiding political dependence
  Tránh bị lệ thuộc về chính trị

— Assoc. Prof., Dr. Phan Trọng Hào,

The four-avoiding suggest Vietnam to avoid situations making the state being internationally sanctioned, which would practically isolate the country from necessary interactions with the international community, while orienting the state to deliberately avoid any military conflict engagements and retain its policy and its political sovereignty.
