= Army general (Vietnam) =

Highest military rank of Vietnam

Army general Đại tướng
- Four-star insignia of the rank of Army general
- Country: Vietnam
- Service branch: People's Army of Vietnam
- Rank group: General officer
- Rank: Four-star
- Formation: March 22, 1946
- Next lower rank: Thượng tướng (Colonel general)
- Equivalent ranks: General

Army general (Vietnamese: Đại tướng, lit. 'Grand general') is the highest military rank of Vietnam and the highest rank in the People's Army of Vietnam.

According to Article 88 of the 2013 Constitution of Vietnam, the rank of General of the Vietnam People's Army is decided by the President, who is also the Chairman of the National Defense and Security Council.

The rank of Army General is conferred only on senior officers holding the following positions: Minister of National Defense, Chief of the General Staff and Director of the General Political Department. Exceptions include:

- Hoàng Văn Thái was promoted in 1980 while serving as Deputy Minister of National Defense and Deputy Chief of the General Staff, although he was the first Chief of the General Staff from 1945–1954 and acted briefly as Chief of the General Staff in 1954 and 1974).
- Lê Đức Anh in 1984 when he was Deputy Minister of Defense and commander of Vietnamese volunteer troops in Cambodia.

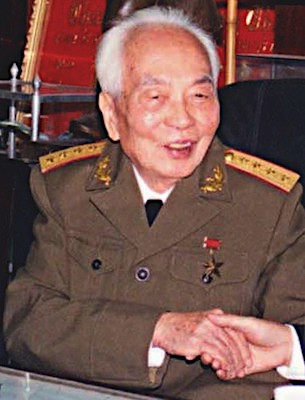
General Võ Nguyên Giáp. He was the first Vietnamese Army General promoted, and is arguably the greatest General in the military history of Vietnam.

As of November 4, 2025, the Vietnam People's Army has had 19 servicemen conferred the rank of Army General.

There were two servicemen who were directly promoted to the rank of General without intermediaries: Võ Nguyên Giáp (1948) and Nguyễn Chí Thanh (1959).

Currently, there are 3 Army Generals in service, namely Phan Văn Giang, Minister of National Defense, Nguyễn Tân Cương, Chief of the General Staff, and Nguyễn Trọng Nghĩa, Director of the General Political Department. Furthermore, there is one more Army General who remains active in politics, but is no longer serving in the army: Director of the Party's Propaganda and Mass Mobilization Department Trịnh Văn Quyết, who was formerly Director of the General Political Department.

== Rank insignia ==
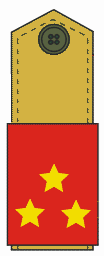
1946 rank insignia

According to Decree No. 33 of March 22, 1946 signed by the President of the Government of the Democratic Republic of Vietnam, the rank of General of the National Army of Vietnam was first regulated with the rank of 3 gold stars on the shoulder on red background. However, at that time, no soldier had been awarded this rank. It was not until January 20, 1948, that Commander-in-Chief of the National Army and militia and self-defense militia Võ Nguyên Giáp was the first to be conferred this rank.

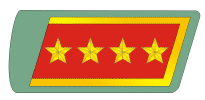
1958 rank insignia

The rank of General was again redefined with the Law on Service Regulations of Officers of the Vietnam People's Army dated May 31, 1958 and Decree 307-TTg dated June 20, 1958 also stipulates that the rank of General carries 4 gold stars above the rank. And on August 31, 1959, Chairman of the General Department of Politics Nguyễn Chí Thanh was the second person to be conferred the rank of General.

== List of Vietnam army generals ==
No.	Name	Lifespan	date of appointment	left military service	Ref.
1	Võ Nguyên Giáp	1911–2013	1948	1980	
2	Nguyễn Chí Thanh	1914–1967	1959	1967 #	
3	Văn Tiến Dũng	1917–2002	1974	1987	
4	Hoàng Văn Thái	1915–1986	1980	1986 #	
5	Chu Huy Mân	1913–2006	1980	1987	
6	Lê Trọng Tấn	1914–1986	1984	1986	
7	Lê Đức Anh	1920–2019	1984	1991	
8	Nguyễn Quyết	1922–2024	1990	1991	
9	Đoàn Khuê	1923–1999	1990	1997	
10	Phạm Văn Trà	1935–	2003	2006	
11	Lê Văn Dũng	1945–2026	2007	2011	
12	Phùng Quang Thanh	1949–2021	2007	2016	
13	Đỗ Bá Tỵ	1954–	2015	2016	
14	Ngô Xuân Lịch	1954–	2015	2021	
15	Lương Cường	1957–	2019	2024	
16	Phan Văn Giang	1960–	2021		
17	Nguyễn Tân Cương	1966–	2024		
18	Trịnh Văn Quyết	1966–	2025		
19	Nguyễn Trọng Nghĩa	1962–	2025		

== See also ==
- Vietnamese military ranks and insignia
