= Lê Đức Anh =

President of Vietnam from 1992 to 1997

Army general Lê Đức Anh
- Official portrait, 1986

5th President of Vietnam
- In office 23 September 1992 – 24 September 1997
- Prime Minister: Võ Văn Kiệt
- Vice President: Nguyễn Thị Bình
- Leader: Đỗ Mười
- Preceded by: Võ Chí Công
- Succeeded by: Trần Đức Lương

Chairman of the Council for National Defense and Security
- In office 23 September 1992 – 23 September 1997
- Deputy: Võ Văn Kiệt
- Succeeded by: Trần Đức Lương

Minister of Defence
- In office 16 February 1987 – 8 August 1992
- Prime Minister: Phạm Hùng; Võ Văn Kiệt; Đỗ Mười
- Preceded by: Văn Tiến Dũng
- Succeeded by: Đoàn Khuê

4th Chief of the General Staff
- In office December 1986 – February 1987
- President: Trường Chinh
- Preceded by: Lê Trọng Tấn
- Succeeded by: Đoàn Khuê

Chairman of the Military Governing Committee Saigon-Gia Dinh
- In office 30 April 1975 – 1 May 1975
- Prime Minister: Huỳnh Tấn Phát (President of the Government)
- Preceded by: Đại tá Quách Huỳnh Hà (as Governor of Saigon) Nguyễn Văn Chì (Revolutionary People's Committee of the Saigon - Gia Dinh region)
- Succeeded by: Trần Văn Trà

Member of the Politburo
- In office 31 March 1982 – 29 December 1997

Personal details
- Born: 1 December 1920 Phú Lộc, Huế, Annam, French Indochina
- Died: 22 April 2019 (aged 98) Hanoi, Vietnam
- Resting place: Thủ Đức City, Ho Chi Minh City
- Party: Communist Party of Vietnam (1945–2019)
- Awards: Gold Star Order; Ho Chi Minh Order; Military Exploit Order

Military service
- Branch/service: Vietnam People's Army
- Years of service: 1945–1992
- Rank: Army General

Lê Đức Anh (Vietnamese: [le˧˧ ʔɗɨk̚˧˦ ʔajŋ̟˧˧]; 1 December 1920 – 22 April 2019) was a Vietnamese general and politician who served as the fifth President of Vietnam from 1992 to 1997. A veteran of the wars against France and the United States, he was deputy commander of the 1975 Ho Chi Minh campaign, served as Chairman of the Saigon-Gia Dinh Military Management Committee at 11:30 on 30/4 to in the afternoon on 1/5/1975 which ended the Vietnam War. He commanded the Vietnamese forces that invaded Cambodia in 1978 and drove the Khmer Rouge from power, and he led Vietnamese forces in the country through most of the 1980s. He was promoted to the rank of army general in 1984, and he served as Chief of the General Staff and then Minister of Defence from 1987 to 1991.

As president, Lê Đức Anh was regarded as a conservative who advocated maintaining tight party control over domestic policies. He helped to normalise Vietnam's relations with China and the United States, and in 1995 he became the first president from Hanoi to visit the United States. He suffered a major stroke in 1996, and he stepped down in September 1997.

== Early life ==
Lê Đức Anh was born on 1 December 1920 in Lộc An commune, in Phú Lộc District of Thừa Thiên–Huế Province. According to Prime Minister Nguyễn Xuân Phúc, his paternal grandfather was a scholar who took part in the Cần Vương movement against the French. In 1937, at the age of 17, Lê Đức Anh joined the democratic movement in Phú Vang, and in May 1938 he was admitted to the Indochinese Communist Party. From 1939 to 1944, he worked in mutual-aid associations in Hội An, Đà Lạt, Lộc Ninh and Thủ Dầu Một, and he organised workers on the rubber plantations around Lộc Ninh.

== Military career ==
=== First Indochina War ===
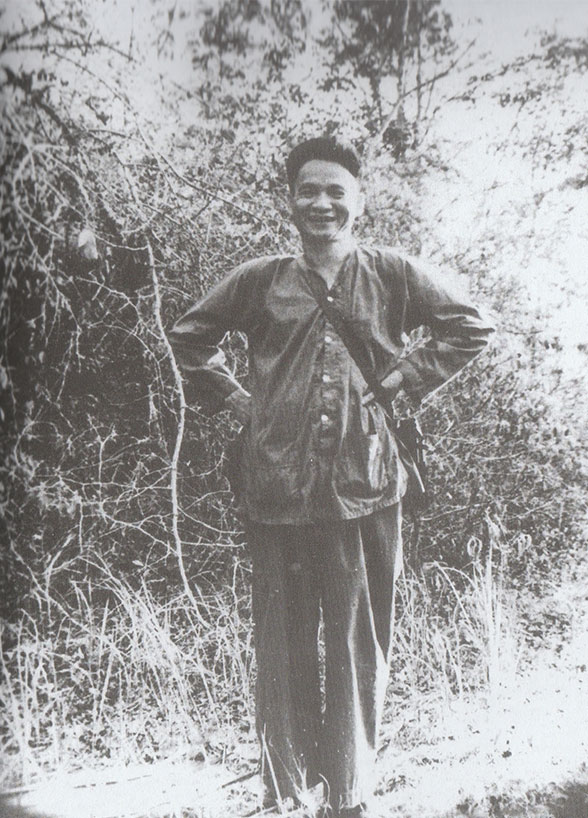
Lê Đức Anh during the Vietnam War, as deputy commander of the People's Liberation Armed Forces of South Vietnam

After his participation in the August Revolution of 1945, which led to the founding of the Democratic Republic of Vietnam on 2 September 1945, Lê Đức Anh began his military service in the forces of the Việt Minh. In August 1945, he led the uprisings that seized power on the rubber plantations and in the districts of Hớn Quản and Bù Đốp, in present-day Bình Phước province. He then became political commissar of a company that later grew into the 301st Regiment, and a member of the Thủ Dầu Một provincial party committee. From 1948 to 1954, he served as chief of staff of Military Zones 7 and 8 and of the Saigon–Chợ Lớn Military Region, and as deputy chief of staff of the Southern Command.

=== Vietnam War ===
After the Geneva Accords of 1954, Lê Đức Anh moved to the North with the regrouped southern forces. From 1955 to 1963, he held posts in the operations and military forces departments of the General Staff of the People's Army of Vietnam, and he was promoted to colonel in December 1958. He then became a deputy chief of the General Staff. In early 1964, he returned to the South as chief of staff and deputy commander of the Southern Command, the headquarters of the People's Liberation Armed Forces of South Vietnam. During the Tet Offensive of 1968, he was the command's chief of staff. He later commanded Military Region 9 in the Mekong Delta.

In April 1974, Lê Đức Anh was one of two officers of the People's Army promoted directly from colonel to lieutenant general. During the Ho Chi Minh campaign in April 1975, he was deputy commander of the campaign and commander of Group 232, which advanced on Saigon from the west and south-west. But, at precisely 11:30 a.m. on April 30, he assumed the role of Chairman of the Saigon-Gia Dinh Military Management Committee—following the unconditional surrender of the Republic of Vietnam, as declared by President Duong Van Minh to the Liberation Army—while simultaneously serving as Deputy Commander of the Liberation Army of South Vietnam until the afternoon of May 1.

=== Cambodia ===
After the war, Lê Đức Anh commanded Military Region 9 from 1976 and Military Region 7 from 1978, and he was a standing member of the Central Military Commission. He commanded the 1978 invasion of Cambodia, which drove the Khmer Rouge from Phnom Penh. In 1981, he was appointed deputy minister of defence and commander of the Vietnamese volunteer forces in Cambodia, and he was promoted to colonel general in January of that year. According to the Voice of Vietnam, he spent about ten years in Cambodia, as commander of the volunteer army and head of the leadership of the Vietnamese advisers' team. The historian Margaret Slocomb identified him as the commander of the Vietnamese forces stationed in the People's Republic of Kampuchea in the 1980s. He formulated five key points for the defence of Cambodia against Khmer Rouge re-infiltration, and he was the architect of the K5 Plan to seal the border with Thailand. On 22 December 1984, while serving as the officer in charge of operations in Cambodia and as a member of the Politburo, he was promoted to army general, the highest rank in the armed forces.

== Minister of Defence ==
In December 1986, Lê Đức Anh succeeded the late General Lê Trọng Tấn as Chief of the General Staff. In February 1987, he succeeded General Văn Tiến Dũng as Minister of Defence. As minister, he presided over a large-scale demobilisation of the army, which accompanied the withdrawal of Vietnamese troops from Cambodia in 1989. According to VietNamNet, he also launched a search for American military personnel missing in action. According to his former assistant, Colonel Khuất Biên Hòa, he sent the orthopaedic surgeon Nguyễn Huy Phan to a medical conference in the United States, with instructions not to discuss politics, in an effort to build goodwill with American doctors.

During his time as defence minister, Lê Đức Anh was already a major conservative voice in Vietnam's political system. In 1989, after the collapse of communism in Eastern Europe, he warned about the alleged threat of the West undermining Vietnam's Communist Party, and argued for more army involvement in politics "at a time when Vietnamese socialism was under attack". In 1991, control over policy towards Cambodia and China was handed to him, and he was therefore involved in the normalisation of Vietnam's relations with China in November of that year. In July 1991, he travelled to Beijing as an envoy of the Politburo. He remained defence minister until 1991, when he was succeeded by General Đoàn Khuê.

Lê Đức Anh was a member of the Central Committee of the Communist Party from the 4th to the 8th congress, a member of the Politburo from the 5th to the 8th congress, a member of the Secretariat during the 7th term, and a standing member of the Politburo during the 8th term. He was a deputy in the 6th, 8th and 9th National Assemblies.

== President ==
On 23 September 1992, the National Assembly elected Lê Đức Anh to the newly strengthened post of state president. The post replaced the collective presidency of the Council of State, which had been chaired by Võ Chí Công. Although a mostly symbolic position, the presidency became much more important during his tenure. Human Rights Watch described him as a hard-liner who had directed the invasion of Cambodia, and wrote that the choice of new leaders suggested a continuing policy of economic reform coupled with tight political control.

=== Domestic politics ===
Lê Đức Anh is considered to be the most ideologically conservative of the three political leaders during his tenure. Prime Minister Võ Văn Kiệt was associated with the reform camp, and therefore often disagreed with him. The general secretary of the Communist Party of Vietnam Đỗ Mười was ideologically more flexible and came to be seen as representing the middle ground between Lê Đức Anh and Kiệt, but he seems to have tended towards conservative positions. In 1995, The Christian Science Monitor reported that conservatives, including most senior army officers, sided with Lê Đức Anh and Đỗ Mười, while reformers clustered around Kiệt.

His opposition to Kiệt's reform ambitions was part of a long-lasting rivalry. In 1991, Lê Đức Anh supported Đỗ Mười in his candidacy for the party leadership against Võ Văn Kiệt. The Kiệt camp later spread rumours about wrongdoing in which Lê Đức Anh was said to have been involved in Cambodia. In 1996, the dispute over the pace of reform led the Eighth National Congress of the party to keep the leadership troika of Lê Đức Anh, Đỗ Mười and Võ Văn Kiệt in office.

=== Foreign relations ===
In November 1993, Lê Đức Anh visited Beijing, the first Vietnamese president to do so in 38 years. He found consensus with the Chinese on expanding economic relations, but he could not secure agreement on the conflicting claims in the South China Sea. During his presidency, he also made official visits to Laos and Indonesia, attended the celebrations of the 50th anniversary of the Victory in Europe Day in France in May 1995, and visited Brazil and the Philippines later that year. On 28 July 1995, Vietnam was admitted to the Association of Southeast Asian Nations.

The United States lifted its trade embargo on Vietnam in 1994 and restored full diplomatic relations in 1995. In August 1995, Lê Đức Anh received the US Secretary of State Warren Christopher in Hanoi. In October 1995, he became the first president from Hanoi to visit the United States, when he attended the celebrations of the 50th anniversary of the United Nations in New York. During the visit, he presented the United Nations with a replica of the Ngọc Lũ bronze drum.

=== Health and retirement ===
In mid-November 1996, Lê Đức Anh was hospitalised after a major stroke. This came at a time when the reform camp that he opposed was in decline, and for some time his illness seemed to change the dynamics within the political leadership, weakening the conservative camp and reinvigorating the reform camp. However, Đỗ Mười led a counter-attack against the reform camp, warning of the dangers of the "current market economy". The conservative camp gained further momentum when Lê Đức Anh unexpectedly recovered in April 1997. He stepped down as president in September 1997, and he was succeeded by Trần Đức Lương. From December 1997 to April 2001, he served as an adviser to the party's Central Committee.

== Personal life ==
In 1951, Lê Đức Anh married his first wife, Phạm Thị Anh (1923–2011), and they had two daughters. In 1956, he married his second wife, Võ Thị Lê (1926 – 18 November 2017), and they had a son and a daughter.

On 21 February 2018, he suffered a cerebral haemorrhage and was admitted to the Central Military Hospital 108 in Hanoi in critical condition. In April 2018, he received the badge for 80 years of party membership. He was discharged in June and resumed public life, but he was readmitted in July.

== Death and funeral ==
Lê Đức Anh died at 20:10 on 22 April 2019, at his home in Hanoi. He was 98, although Vietnamese media reported his age as 99. He was given a state funeral, and 3 and 4 May 2019 were declared days of national mourning. His body lay in state at the National Funeral Hall in Hanoi on 3 May, where Prime Minister Nguyễn Xuân Phúc delivered the eulogy, describing him as "an outstanding commander with strategic vision". He was buried that afternoon at the Ho Chi Minh City Cemetery.

== Honours and awards ==
- Gold Star Order
- Military Exploit Order, 1st class
- Feat of Arms Order, 1st class
- Badge for 80 years of party membership (2018)

== See also ==
- K5 Plan

== Sources ==
- Bolton, Kent (1999): "Domestic Sources of Vietnam's Foreign Policy: Normalizing Relations with the United States". in Thayer, Carlyle A., Amer, Ramses (ed.): Vietnamese Foreign Policy in Transition. Institute of Southeast Asian Studies, Singapore
- Thayer, Carlyle A. (1999): "Vietnamese Foreign Policy: Multilateralism and the Threat of Peaceful Evolution". in Thayer, Carlyle A., Amer, Ramses (1999): Vietnamese Foreign Policy in Transition. Institute of Southeast Asian Studies, Singapore
- Wurfel, David (1999): "Between China and ASEAN: The Dialectics of Recent Vietnamese Foreign Policy". in Thayer, Carlyle A., Amer, Ramses (ed.): Vietnamese Foreign Policy in Transition. Institute of Southeast Asian Studies, Singapore

Political offices
Preceded by Võ Chí Công	President of Vietnam; 1992–1997	Succeeded by Trần Đức Lương
