= Phùng Quang Thanh =

Vietnamese politician (1949–2021)

Army General Phùng Quang Thanh
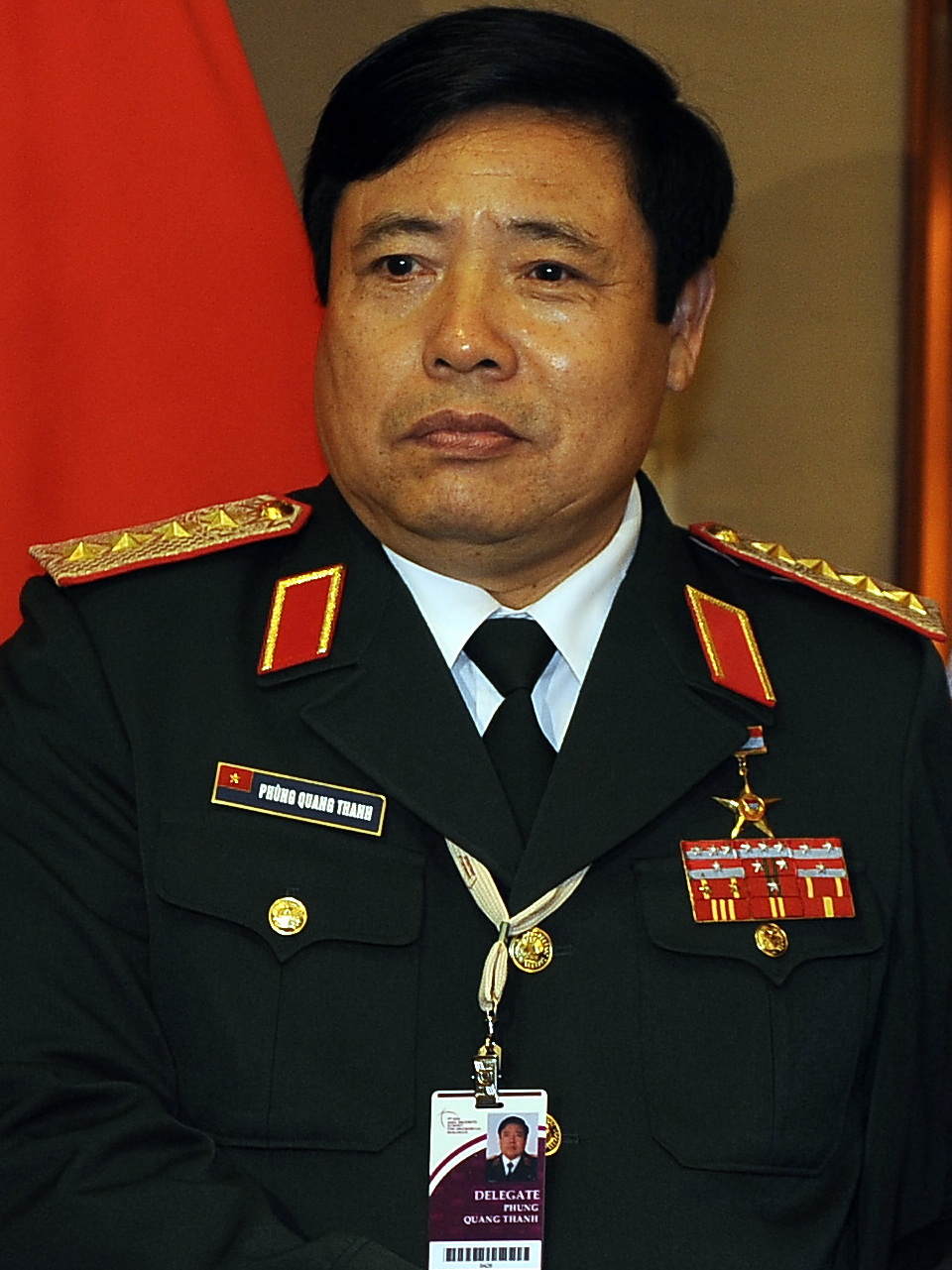

10th Minister of Defence
- In office 28 June 2006 – 8 April 2016
- President: Nguyễn Minh Triết; Trương Tấn Sang; Trần Đại Quang
- Prime Minister: Nguyễn Tấn Dũng; Nguyễn Xuân Phúc
- Preceded by: Phạm Văn Trà
- Succeeded by: Ngô Xuân Lịch

Member of the Politburo
- In office 25 April 2006 – 28 January 2016

10th Chief of the General Staff
- In office May 2001 – August 2006
- President: Trần Đức Lương; Nguyễn Minh Triết
- Preceded by: Lê Văn Dũng
- Succeeded by: Nguyễn Khắc Nghiên

Personal details
- Born: 2 February 1949 Mê Linh, Hanoi, Vietnam
- Died: 11 September 2021 (aged 72) Ba Đình, Hanoi, Vietnam
- Party: Communist Party of Vietnam (1967–2021)
- Education: Voroshilov Academy; Military Academy of Vietnam
- Awards: Hero of the People's Armed Forces; Glorious Fighter Medal; Vietnam Feat Order

Military service
- Allegiance: Vietnam
- Branch/service: Vietnam People's Army
- Years of service: 1967–2016
- Rank: Army General
- Battles/wars: Vietnam War

Phùng Quang Thanh (Vietnamese pronunciation: [fʊwŋ͡m˨˩ kwaːŋ˧˧ tʰajŋ̟˧˧]; 2 February 1949 – 11 September 2021) was a General of the Vietnam People's Army and served both as Minister of Defense from 2006 to 2016, and Deputy Secretary of the Central Military Commission. He was Chief of the General Staff of the Vietnam’s People Army from 2001 to 2006, A member of the Politburo and National Assembly.

He enlisted in 1967, and fought in various battles during the Vietnam War and was honored for bravery with the title and medal as Hero of the People's Armed Forces in 1971 at age 22.

== Military career ==
Phùng Quang Thanh was born on 2 February 1948 in Thạch Đà commune, Mê Linh district, Hanoi. In 1967, he joined the army at the age of 18 and was admitted to the People’s Revolutionary Party. He participated in combat in the Quảng Trị battlefield, Southern Laos during the Vietnam War, and the Sino-Vietnamese War.

In his early years, Thanh fought in various battles of the Vietnam War notably in the Quảng Trị campaign and during the counter-offensive of the Vietnam People's Army against Operation Lam Son 719 where he served as company commander (đại đội trưởng) in the 9th Battalion, 64th Regiment, 320th Division.

On February 11, 1971, Phùng Quang Thanh, the platoon leader of 1st Company, 9th Battalion, 64th Regiment, 320th Division, personally commanded a squad defending the Hill Không Tên. Against a company of airborne troops of the Army of the Republic of Vietnam (ARVN) with aerial support, the enemy using one company with air support, launched an attack in two directions. Phùng Quang Thanh commanded his squad (tiểu đội) to hold fire until the enemy was close before opening fire, killing 38 of the enemy soldiers and forcing them to retreat. He personally was credited with killing 8 of the enemy. Two days later, the enemy attacked the position again. Phùng Quang Thanh was wounded, and his superiors ordered him to withdraw to the rear, but he requested to stay and continue fighting. He asked his comrades to remove the safety caps from 17 grenades and place them in a bag around his body. A medic bandaged him and tied up his left arm to prevent it from getting in the way. He then led his squad in a flank attack against the enemy, coordinating with allied units to completely destroy the enemy company. His squad alone killed 37 enemy soldiers, captured one, and seized two weapons. For this feat of arm, Thanh was awarded the prestigious title Hero of the People's Armed Forces (Anh hùng lực lượng vũ trang nhân dân) on 20 September 1971.

In June 1971 he was ordered to leave combat to study in the School for Infantry Officers, later in the Academy of Infantry, he was also appointed commander of the 9th Battalion, 320th Division, 1st Army Corps (Vietnam People's Army) (Quân đoàn 1) from 1972. During the war, he received total three Liberation Distinguished Service Medals, 1st Order (Huân chương Chiến công Giải phóng hạng nhất), three Brave Soldier Titles (Danh hiệu Dũng sĩ) and other awards.

After the Vietnam War, Thanh continued to hold several positions in the 1st Army Corps from chief of staff of the 64th Regiment to acting commander of the 312th Division in 1988. In 1991, after two years studying in the Soviet Union and the Military Academy of Vietnam, Thanh was promoted to commander (sư đoàn trưởng) of the 312th Division. Afterwards, he served in the General Staff of the Vietnam People's Army from 1993 to 1997 and as commander (tư lệnh) of the 1st Military Zone from 1997 to 2001.

In May 2001, Thanh became Chief of the General Staff and Deputy Minister of Defence of Vietnam. Five years later, he was elected to the Politburo of the Communist Party of Vietnam and began to hold the position of Minister of Defence of Vietnam, succeeding General Phạm Văn Trà.

== Health rumors and Death ==
General Thanh visited France for medical care on 24 June 2015, due to complications from a wartime lung injury. The month-long absence sparked rumors of an assassination attempt; he was reported dead on 19 July by a German newspaper but this later was found to be false; he made a full return to Hanoi on 25 July.

On the morning of September 11, 2021, according to information from the Central Committee for Protection and Care of Health for Senior Officials, General Phùng Quang Thanh died at 3:45 AM on September 11, 2021 (corresponding to the 5th day of the 8th lunar month, Year of the Ox) at his private residence. He succumbed to his illness after a prolonged period of severe health decline, leaving behind a son.

Despite the efforts of the Communist Party of Vietnam, the Vietnamese government, a team of dedicated professors and doctors, and his family’s devoted care, he succumbed to his illness after a prolonged period of severe health decline.

== Rank ==
Phùng Quang Thanh was promoted to major general in 1996, lieutenant general in 1998, colonel general in 2003 and army general in 2006.
