= Commander of the Navy (Vietnam) =

- Tư lệnh Quân chủng Hải quân Nhân dân Việt Nam

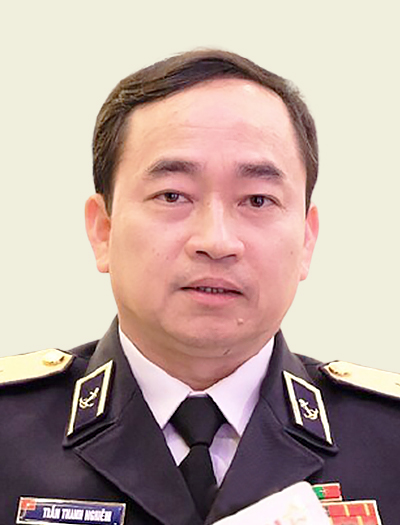
- Incumbent; Trần Thanh Nghiêm since 11 September 2020
- Vietnam People's Navy
- Reports to: Chief of the General Staff
- Term length: Not fixed
- Formation: 1964
- First holder: Tạ Xuân Thu

The Commander of the Vietnamese People's Navy (Vietnamese: Tư lệnh Quân chủng Hải quân Nhân dân Việt Nam) is responsible for organization, construction, management and the highest commander of the Vietnam People's Navy.

== List of commanders ==
Acting

No.	Portrait	Name (Birth–Death)	Term of office			Ref.
No.	Portrait	Name (Birth–Death)	Took office	Left office	Time in office	Ref.
1		RADM; Tạ Xuân Thu (1916–1971)	1964	1964	0 years	
2		RADM; Nguyễn Bá Phát (1921–1993)	1964	1974	9–10 years	
3		RADM; Đoàn Bá Khánh	1974	1975	0–1 years	
(2)		RADM; Nguyễn Bá Phát (1921–1990)	1976	1977	0–1 years	
4		VADM; Giáp Văn Cương (1921–1990)	1977	1980	2–3 years	
(3)		RADM; Đoàn Bá Khánh	1981	1984	2–3 years	
(4)		ADM; Giáp Văn Cương (1921–1990)	1984	1990	5–6 years	
5		VADM; Hoàng Hữu Thái	1990	1994	3–4 years	
6		VADM; Mai Xuân Vĩnh (born 1931)	1994	1999	4–5 years	
7		RADM; Võ Nhân Huân	1999	1999	0 years	
8		VADM; Đỗ Xuân Công (1943–2022)	February 2000	June 2005	5 years, 4 months	
9		ADM; Nguyễn Văn Hiến (born 1954)	June 2005	14 June 2015	10 years	
10		ADM; Phạm Hoài Nam (born 1967)	14 June 2015	28 July 2020	5 years, 44 days	
–		VADM; Trần Thanh Nghiêm (born 1970)	28 July 2020	11 September 2020	45 days	
11		VADM; Trần Thanh Nghiêm (born 1970)	11 September 2020	Incumbent	6 years, 23 days	
