= Trần Văn Trà =

North Vietnamese commander

Colonel General Trần Văn Trà
- Trần Văn Trà in 1974

Chairman of the Military Governing Committee Saigon-Gia Dinh
- In office 1 May 1975 – 20 January 1976
- Prime Minister: Huỳnh Tấn Phát (President of the Government)
- Vice President: Võ Văn Kiệt; Mai Chí Thọ; Major general Hoàng Cầm; Major general Trần Văn Danh; Cao Đăng Chiêm
- Preceded by: Lê Đức Anh
- Succeeded by: Võ Văn Kiệt (as Chairman of People's Committee of Ho Chi Minh City)

Personal details
- Born: 15 September 1919 Sơn Tịnh, Quảng Ngãi, Annam
- Died: 20 April 1996 (aged 76) Ho Chi Minh City, Vietnam
- Awards: Resolution for Victory Order
- Nickname: Tư Chi

Military service
- Allegiance: North Vietnam
- Branch/service: People's Army of Vietnam
- Years of service: 1938–1982
- Rank: Colonel General
- Commands: (Provisional Revolutionary Government of the Republic of South Vietnam) (PLAF) Commander of the Liberation Army; Deputy Secretary of the Military Committee; Deputy Regional Commander (8 June 1968 to 2 July 1976)
- Battles/wars: First Indochina War; Vietnam War; Tet Offensive; Easter Offensive; Ho Chi Minh Campaign

Nguyễn Chấn, known as Trần Văn Trà (15 September 1919 – 20 April 1996) was a colonel-general in the People's Army of Vietnam. He was Commander of B2 Front during 1963 – 1967, Deputy Commander of Liberation Army of South Vietnam during 1968 – 1972; member of the Central Committee of the Workers' Party of Vietnam from 1960 to 1982 (3rd and 4th terms) and second chairman of Saigon administration after Fall of Saigon.

== Early life ==
The son of a bricklayer, Trần Văn Trà was born in Quảng Ngãi Province in 1918. He joined the Indochinese Communist Party in 1938 and spent the years of the Second World War in a French prison. Between 1946 and 1954, Trà fought against the French in the Vietnam People's Army and became a general in 1961, commanding communist forces in the southern half of South Vietnam. During the days of The First Indochina War with the French, the Viet Minh recruited more than 600 defeated Japanese soldiers to fight with them.

In June 1946, some of these Japanese followers became instructors in a military school set up by the Viet Minh in Quang Ngai Province, Trà's birthplace, to teach fighting skills to more than 400 Vietnamese trainees. It is not known if Trà was one of the organisers or attendees at this military training school. He was Commander of 7th Military Region (1949-1950) and Vice Commander of Cochinchina (1951-1954).

== Vietnam War ==
During the Vietnam War against the Americans and South Vietnamese, he led the attack on Saigon during the Tet Offensive of 1968 and commanded the B2 Front during the Easter Offensive.

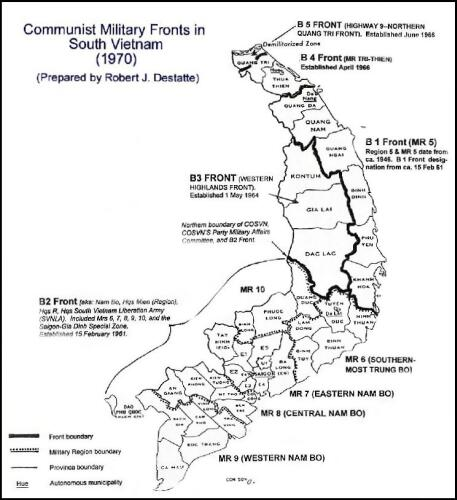
NLF Fronts and Military regions, 1970

During a 1974 meeting of North Vietnamese military leaders in Hanoi, Trà argued against a conservative strategy during the coming year and suggested that South Vietnam's Phước Long Province be attacked in order to test both South Vietnamese and American military reaction. The attack was successful and the U.S. did not respond militarily, prompting larger, more aggressive communist operations. In April 1975, Trà became Deputy Commander of the A75 headquarters under Senior General Văn Tiến Dũng during the Ho Chi Minh Campaign, the final assault on Saigon which led to the capitulation of the South Vietnamese government. He took charge of Vice-Minister of Defence from 1978 to 1982.

In 1982, Trà published Vietnam: A History of the Bulwark B-2 Theatre, Volume 5, Concluding the 30-Years War, which revealed how the Hanoi Politburo had overestimated its own military capabilities and underestimated those of the U.S. and South Vietnam prior to and during the Tet Offensive. This account offended and embarrassed the leaders of the newly unified Socialist Republic of Vietnam. This was probably the reason he lost his membership in the Central Committee, and only two volumes were ever published of the five Tra had planned. Suggestions that he remained in such disgrace as to be under something similar to house arrest, until his death on 20 April 1996, (Note: William Head's source contains a critical misinformation that consider Trần Nam Trung was just an alias of Trần Văn Trà. In fact, they were two different figures.) are exaggerated. He published two articles in Tap chi lich su quan su [Journal of military history] in 1988, and he was even permitted to travel to the United States in 1990 to present a paper at a conference at Columbia University. In 1992, the People's Army published another volume of his projected five-volume history of the B-2 Theater. From 1992 to 1996 he was Deputy Chairman of the Veterans Association of Vietnam.
