= Lê Văn Dũng =

Vietnamese politician (1945–2026)

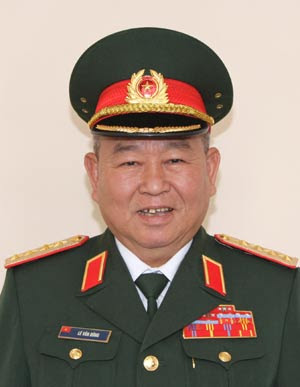
- Lê in 2010

Chief of the General Staff
- In office September 1998 – April 2001

Personal details
- Born: 25 December 1945 Bến Tre province, Cochinchina, French Indochina
- Died: 9 January 2026 (aged 80) Phú Túc, Vietnam
- Party: CPV
- Education: Frunze Military Academy
- Occupation: Military officer

Lê Văn Dũng (25 December 1945 – 9 January 2026) was a Vietnamese politician. A member of the Communist Party, he served as Chief of the General Staff from 1998 to 2001.

Lê died in Phú Túc on 9 January 2026, at the age of 80.
