= Phạm Văn Trà =

Vietnamese politician

General Phạm Văn Trà
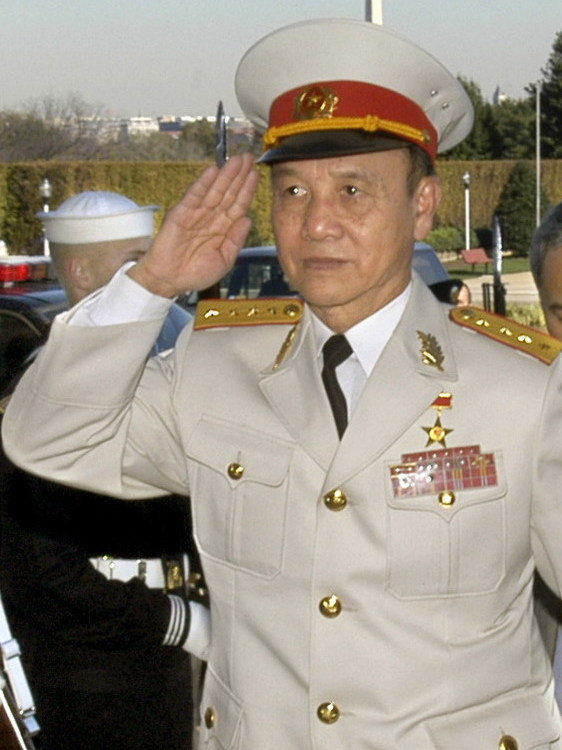

9th Minister of Defence
- In office 29 December 1997 – 28 June 2006
- President: Trần Đức Lương
- Prime Minister: Phan Văn Khải
- Preceded by: Đoàn Khuê
- Succeeded by: Phùng Quang Thanh

7th Chief of General Staff
- In office 1995–1997
- Preceded by: Đào Đình Luyện
- Succeeded by: Đào Trọng Lịch

Member of the Politburo
- In office 1 July 1996 – 25 April 2006

Personal details
- Born: 19 August 1935 (age 91) Quế Võ, Bắc Ninh Province, Tonkin, French Indochina
- Party: Communist Party of Vietnam
- Education: Military Academy of Vietnam
- Awards: Hero of the People's Armed Forces

Military service
- Allegiance: Vietnam
- Branch/service: Vietnam People's Army
- Years of service: 1955–2006
- Rank: General
- Battles/wars: Vietnam War

Phạm Văn Trà (Vietnamese pronunciation: [faːm˧˨ʔ van˧˧ t͡ɕaː˨˩]; born 19 August 1935) is a Vietnamese general and politician who served as Vietnam's Minister of Defense from 1997 to 2006.

Phạm Văn Trà was previously Chief of the General Staff of the People's Army of Vietnam and Vice-Minister of Defense (Dec 1995–1997), and a four-star General. He replaced Đoàn Khuê as minister of defense in September 1997.

Preceded by Đoàn Khuê	Vietnamese Minister of Defense; 1997–2006	Succeeded by Phùng Quang Thanh
