= Phan Văn Giang =

Vietnamese Army general (born 1960)

General Phan Văn Giang
- Giang in 2026

Deputy Prime Minister of Vietnam
- Incumbent
- Assumed office 8 April 2026
- Prime Minister: Lê Minh Hưng
- Preceded by: Bùi Thanh Sơn

12th Minister of Defence ex officio Deputy Secretary of the Party CMC
- Incumbent
- Assumed office 8 April 2021
- President: Nguyễn Xuân Phúc; Võ Văn Thưởng; Tô Lâm; Lương Cường; Tô Lâm
- Prime Minister: Phạm Minh Chính; Lê Minh Hưng
- Preceded by: Ngô Xuân Lịch

Chief of the General Staff
- In office 17 May 2016 – 31 May 2021
- President: Trần Đại Quang; Nguyễn Phú Trọng; Nguyễn Xuân Phúc
- Preceded by: Đỗ Bá Tỵ
- Succeeded by: Nguyễn Tân Cương

Deputy Minister of Defence
- In office 12 April 2016 – 7 April 2021
- Minister: Ngô Xuân Lịch
- Preceded by: Đỗ Bá Tỵ
- Succeeded by: Nguyễn Tân Cương

Personal details
- Born: October 14, 1960 (age 66) Nam Định province, North Vietnam
- Spouse: Hoàng Thị Thu Hồng
- Education: Bachelor's degree in tank and armored command and staff
- Alma mater: Tank and Armor Officer University school (TGH); National Defense Academy
- Website: Government Office; Defence Ministry

Military service
- Allegiance: Vietnam
- Branch/service: Vietnam People's Ground Force
- Years of service: 1978–present
- Rank: Army general
- Commands: Chief of General Staff; 1st Military Region (Vietnam People's Army); Deputy Chief of General Staff; Commander of 1st Corps (Vietnam People's Army); Deputy Commander cum Chief of Staff of 1st Corps (Vietnam People's Army)
- Battles/wars: Sino-Vietnamese War

Phan Văn Giang (born October 14, 1960) is a Vietnamese politician and a General of the Vietnam People's Army. He currently serves as a member of the Politburo, a member of the Standing Committee of the Central Military Commission, Deputy Secretary of the Central Military Commission, Deputy Prime Minister, Minister of National Defence, Chairman of the Central Council for National Defence and Security Education, Head of the Inter-agency Working Group on National Defence and Security, Head of the Steering Committee on Human Rights, a member of the Council for National Defence and Security, and a member of the 16th National Assembly (2026–2031 term).

== Early life and career ==
Phan Văn Giang was born in October 14, 1960 in Núi Hột village, Đồng Hỷ district, Thai Nguyen province but his hometown is Hồng Quang Commune, Nam Trực district, Nam Định province.

Giang began his military career in August 1978, initially serving as an information soldier in 4th Battalion, 677th Regiment of PAVN's 346th Division. His skills were put to the test during the border conflict in February 1979, where he fought at the height of 893 near Pát village of Trà Lĩnh District, Cao Bằng Province. In November 1979, he was selected to study at the Vietnam Military College of Tank Armour Officer to specialize in tank and armor command. In December 1982, he was admitted to the Communist Party of Vietnam. In September 1983, after he graduated from the College of Tank Armour Officer with a Bachelor's degree in tank and armored command and staff, Giang was promptly promoted to Lieutenant and assigned to the 312th Division of 1st Army Corps. Over the years, he assumed various leadership roles within the division, including Platoon Leader and Deputy Commander, while also pursuing advanced training at the National Defense Academy, where he has earned a doctorate in military science.

== High posts ==
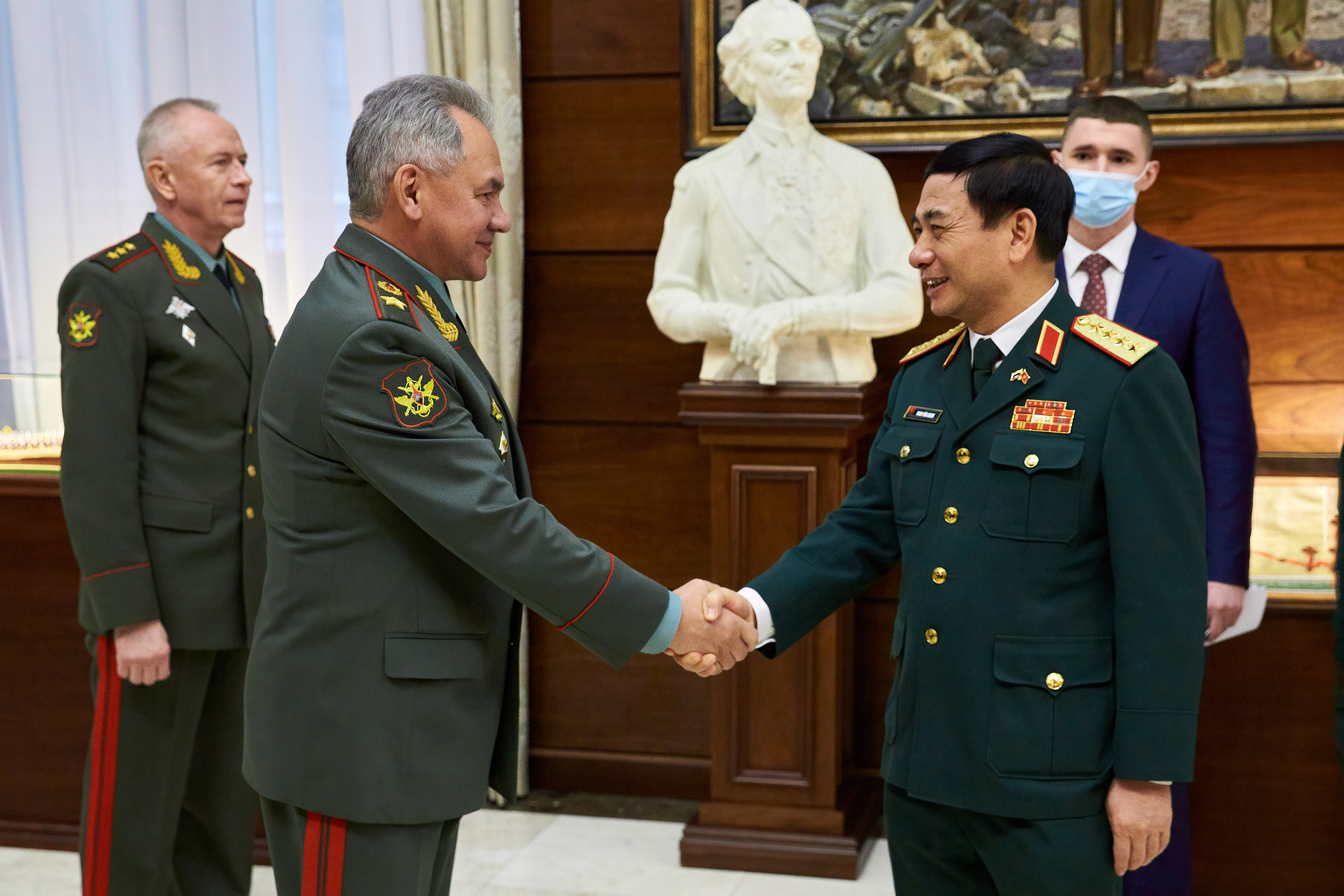
Giang with Russian Defense Minister Sergei Shoigu in December 2021

His rise through the ranks continued with appointments such as Deputy Chief of Staff, Division Commander, and Secretary of the Party Committee. Notably, he was promoted to Major General in August 2010 and later to Lieutenant General in September 2013. Giang's leadership was further recognized when he was elected to the Central Committee of the Communist Party of Vietnam in January 2016. Subsequently, he assumed roles such as Deputy Minister of National Defense and Chief of General Staff of the Vietnam People's Army. In April 2021, he was appointed Deputy Secretary of the Central Military Commission and Minister of National Defense. Beyond his military and political roles, Giang has also been involved in national committees, including leadership positions in COVID-19 prevention and control efforts.

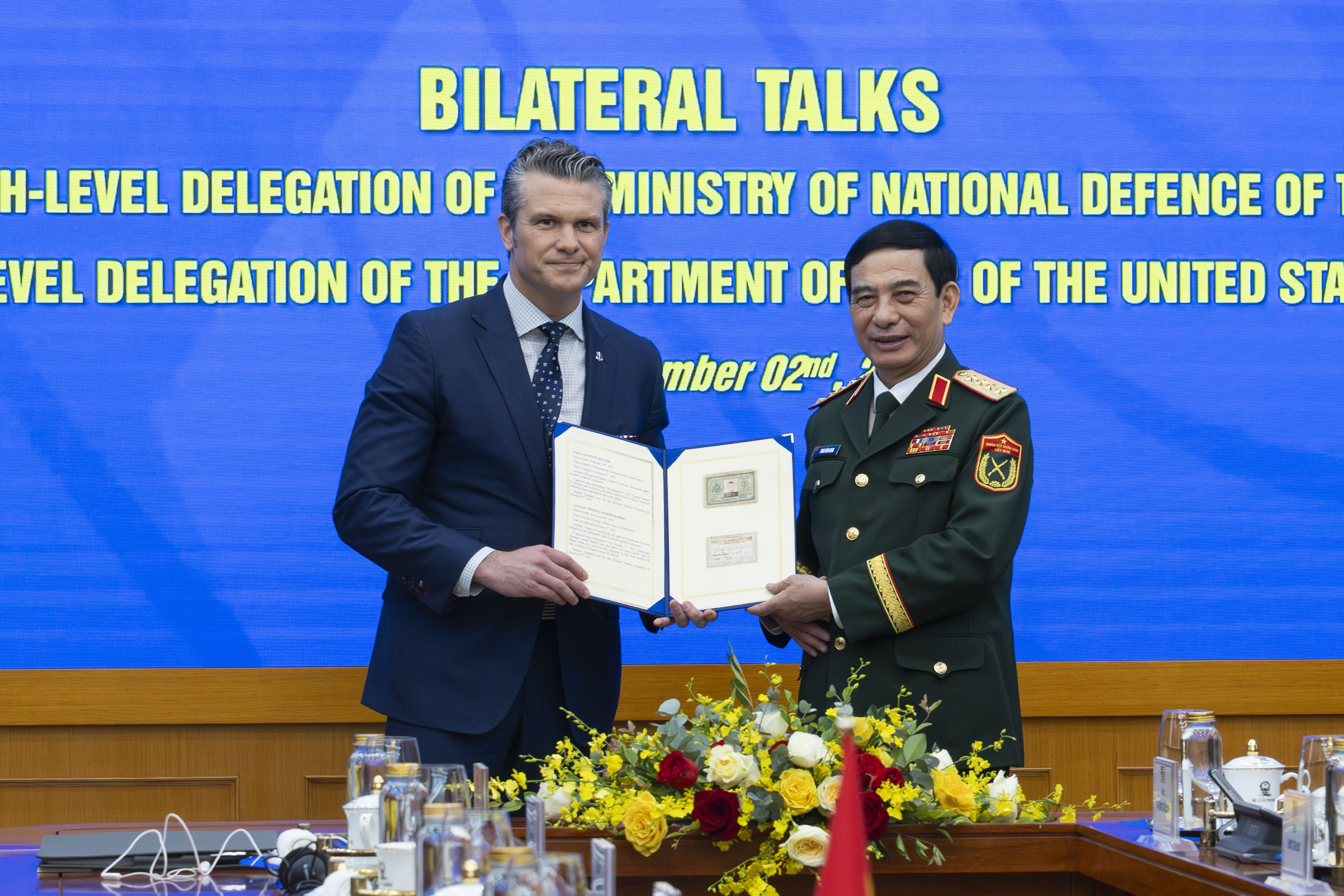
Defence Minister and General Giang met United States Secretary of Defense Pete Hegseth in 2025.

In April 2026, Phan Văn Giang was appointed Deputy Prime Minister. His roles in this position cover the following policy coordination portfolios:

- National Defense
- National Security
- Border affairs and the South China Sea
- Foreign non-governmental aid and NGOs
- Relations between Viet Nam and regional and international organizations.
- Issues related to foreign nationals in Viet Nam.
- Human right issues.
- Investment policies
- Science, technology, innovation, and digital transformation

== Commands ==
- Deputy Commander and Chief of Staff of The 312th Division, The 1st Corps (Vietnam People's Army) (2000–03)
- Commander of the 312th Division, The 1st Corps (Vietnam People's Army) (2003–08)
- Deputy Commander and Chief of Staff of The 1st Corps (Vietnam People's Army) (2008–10)
- Commander of the 1st Corps (Vietnam People's Army) (2010–11)
- Deputy Chief of General Staff (2011–14)
- Commander of 1st Military Region (Vietnam People's Army) (2014–16)
- Chief of the General Staff (2016–21)
- Deputy Prime Minister (2026-now)

== Honours ==
=== Rank ===
Phan Văn Giang was promoted to Major General (Thiếu Tướng) in 2009, Lieutenant General (Trung Tướng) in 2013, Colonel General (Thượng Tướng) in 2017, and Army General in 2021.

=== Medals ===
==== National ====
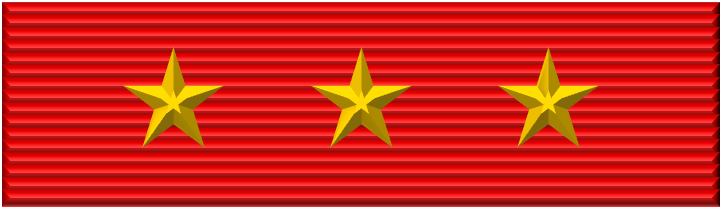

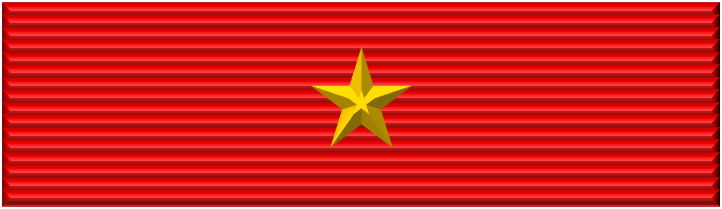

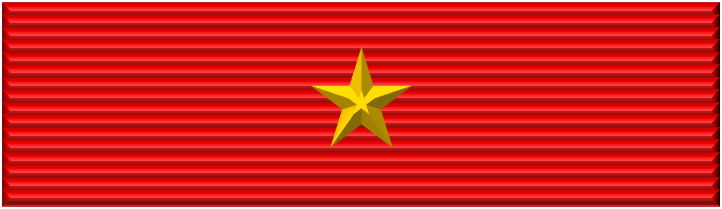

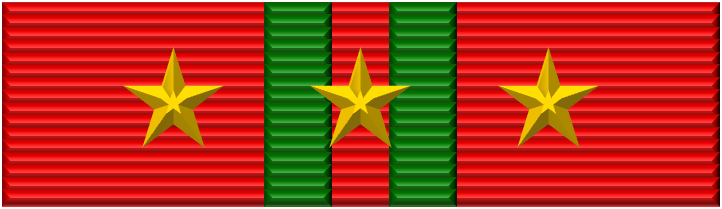

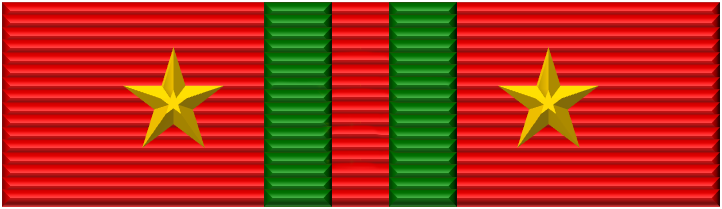

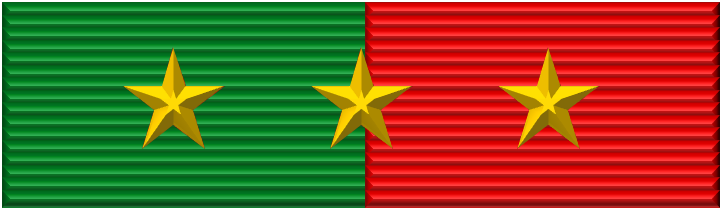

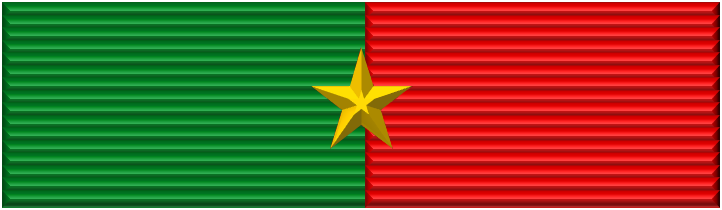

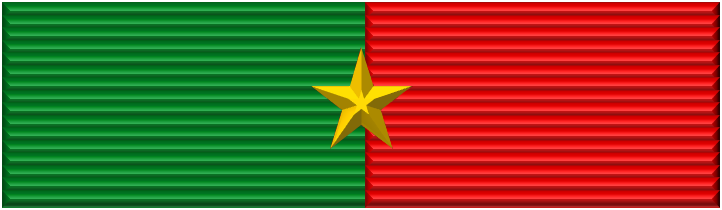

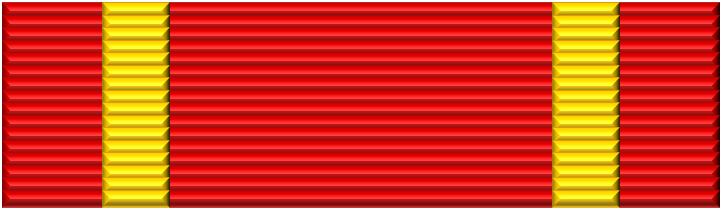

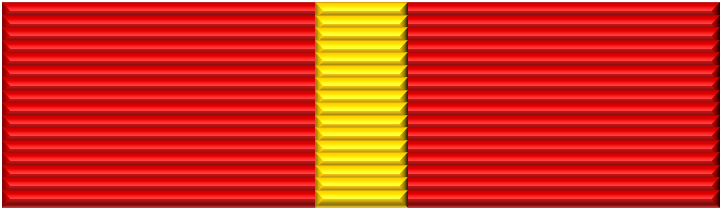

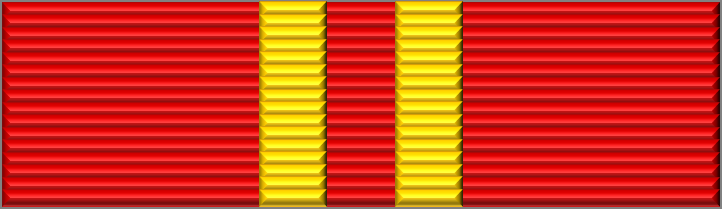

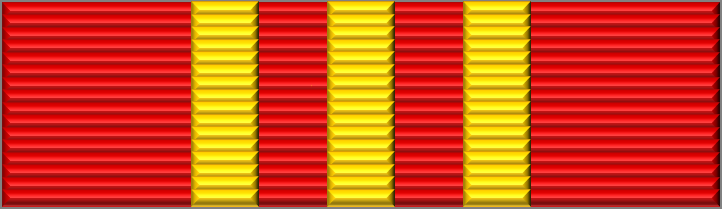

Military Exploit Order; First class	Military Exploit Order; Third class 1st award	Military Exploit Order; Third class 2nd award	Feat Order; First class
Feat Order; Second class	Fatherland Defense Order; First class	Fatherland Defense Order; Third class 1st award	Fatherland Defense Order; Third class 2nd award
Victory Banner Medal	Glorious Fighter Medal; First class	Glorious Fighter Medal; Second class	Glorious Fighter Medal; Third class

- 40 years of Party membership badge

==== Foreign ====
- Grand Officer of the Royal Order of Sahametrei (Cambodia, 2021)
- Order of Playa Girón (Cuba, 2022)
- First, Second and Third Class Medals of Freedom (Laos)
- Order of Friendship (Russia, 2021)

Military offices
Preceded by Ngô Xuân Lịch	Deputy Secretary of the Central Military Commission of the Communist Party of Vietnam; 2021-present	Succeeded by Incumbent
