= Nguyễn Tân Cương =

Vietnamese lieutenant general

Đại tướng Nguyễn Tân Cương
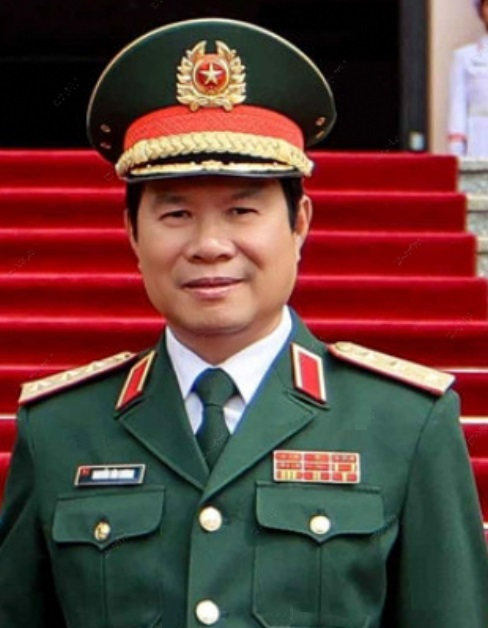

Chief of the General Staff
- Incumbent
- Assumed office 3 June 2021
- President: Nguyễn Xuân Phúc; Vo Van Thuong; Tô Lâm; Lương Cường
- Preceded by: Phan Văn Giang

Deputy Minister of Defence
- Incumbent
- Assumed office 31 December 2019
- Preceded by: Phan Văn Giang

Vice Chief of General Staff
- In office November 2018 – 31 December 2019

Personal details
- Born: 12 February 1966 (age 60) Hà Nam Province, Vietnam
- Party: Communist Party of Vietnam

Military service
- Allegiance: Vietnam
- Branch/service: Vietnam People's Army
- Years of service: 1983–present
- Rank: Army General

Nguyễn Tân Cương (Vietnamese pronunciation: [ŋwiən˦ˀ˥ tən˧˧ kɨəŋ˧˧]; born 12 February 1966) is a Vietnamese general, currently serving as Chief of the General Staff and Deputy Minister of Defence. Nguyễn Tân Cương was born in 1966 in Hà Nam Province, joined the Central Committee of the Communist Party of Vietnam in 2016, and served as the Commander of 4th Military Region.

== Other positions ==
Other positions held included:

- Deputy Commander and Chief of Staff of 4th Military Region (2013–14)
- Commander of 4th Military Region (2014–18)
- Deputy Chief of General Staff (2018–19)
- Deputy Minister of Defence (2019–present)
- Chief of the General Staff (2021–present)

== Ranks ==
- Major General (2012)
- Lieutenant General (2016)
- Colonel General (2021)
- Army General (2024)
