= Đoàn Khuê =

Vietnamese general and politician

General Đoàn Khuê

8th Minister of Defence
- In office August 8, 1992 – December 29, 1997
- Prime Minister: Đỗ Mười; Võ Văn Kiệt
- Preceded by: Lê Đức Anh
- Succeeded by: Phạm Văn Trà

5th Chief of the General Staff
- In office 1987–1992
- Preceded by: Lê Đức Anh
- Succeeded by: Đào Đình Luyện

Personal details
- Born: 29 October 1922 Triệu Phong District, Quảng Trị Province, Annam, French Indochina
- Died: 16 January 1999 (aged 76) Hanoi, Vietnam
- Awards: Gold Star Order; Ho Chi Minh Order; Military Exploit Order; Feat Order; Resolution for Victory Order

Military service
- Allegiance: Viet Minh; Vietnam
- Branch/service: Vietnam People's Army
- Years of service: 1945–1997
- Rank: Army General
- Commands: Việt Minh; Vietnam People's Army
- Battles/wars: First Indochina War, Vietnam War

Đoàn Khuê (Vietnamese pronunciation: [ʔɗwaːn˨˩ xwe˧˧]; Triệu Phong, 29 October 1922 – 16 January 1999) was a Vietnamese Army general and Minister of Defence from 1992–1997.

Đoàn Khuê was born on 29 October 1922 in Triệu Phong District in Quảng Trị Province, joined the Communist Party of Vietnam in 1945, and served as the military Commissioner of the provincial Party Committee.

== Military career ==
Đoàn held various positions during the resistance against French rule (First Indochina War) which was Political Commissar.

Other positions which he held include:

- Political Commissar of the 351st Division Artillery of the Viet Minh
- Deputy Political Commissar of 3rd Military Region (Vietnam People's Army)
- Commander of 5th Military Region (Vietnam People's Army) (1977–80)
- Commander of volunteer Army of Vietnam in Cambodia

From 1987 to 1992, he was the Chief of the General Staff of the Vietnam People's Army.

=== Promotions ===
- Major General, 1975
- Lieutenant General, 1980
- Colonel General, 1985
- Army General, 1990

== Political career ==
Đoàn served as Minister of Defense from 1991 to 1997 under Prime Ministers Đỗ Mười and Võ Văn Kiệt.

== Awards ==
- State of Vietnam Gold Star (posthumously)
- Vietnam Medal of Honor
- 2 first-class Victory Medal
- Order of Victory, first class
- Order of the Resistance

== Personal ==
He has two other siblings:

- Đoàn Chương, Minister of military strategy
- Đoàn Thúy, Army Captain

Preceded by Lê Đức Anh	Vietnamese Minister of Defense; 1992-1997	Succeeded by Phạm Văn Trà
