= Chief of the General Staff (Vietnam) =

Military advisor in the People's Army of Vietnam

- Tổng Tham mưu trưởng

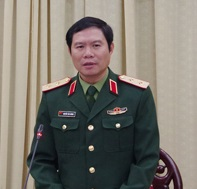
- Incumbent; Nguyễn Tân Cương since 9 April 2021
- Ministry of National Defence
- Member of: General Staff
- Reports to: The president The minister of defence
- Appointer: The president with CPV Politburo introduction, advice and consent
- Term length: No fixed term
- Formation: 7 September 1945
- First holder: Hoàng Văn Thái

The chief of the General Staff (alternatively the general chief of staff; Vietnamese: Tổng Tham mưu trưởng) is the chief of staff of the General Staff of the People's Army of Vietnam. The chief of the General Staff performs the task of advising the minister of defense in terms of state management and military command, by that practically being the second highest-ranking professional leader of the Vietnam People’s Army alongside the Chief of the General Department of Political Affairs. The chief of the General Staff also serves ex officio as standing deputy minister of defense. He is appointed by the president of Vietnam, who is the commander-in-chief. The current chief of the General Staff is Army General Nguyễn Tân Cương

The Vietnamese general chief of staff is externally equivalent to the chiefs of defence or heads of the Joint Chiefs of Staff of other countries.

== List of chiefs of the General Staff ==
No.	Portrait	Chief of General Staff	Took office	Left office	Time in office	Defence branch	Minister of Defence	President	Ref.
1	Hoàng Văn Thái	Army general Hoàng Văn Thái (1915–1986) (Note: Deputy Minister of Defence, Member of the Central Committee of the Communist Party of Vietnam. Leader of Vietcong from 1967 - 1973, Deputy Chief of Staff from 1974 to 1986.)	7 September 1945	1953	7–8 years	Vietnam People's Ground Force	Chu Văn Tấn; Phan Anh; Võ Nguyên Giáp; Ta Quang Buu; Võ Nguyên Giáp	Hồ Chí Minh	–
2	Văn Tiến Dũng	Army general Văn Tiến Dũng (1917–2002) (Note: Later elected to Minister of Defence, Member of the Politburo of the Communist Party of Vietnam.)	1953	1954	0–1 years	Vietnam People's Ground Force	Võ Nguyên Giáp	Hồ Chí Minh	–
(1)	Hoàng Văn Thái	Army general Hoàng Văn Thái (1915–1986)	1954	1954	0 years	Vietnam People's Ground Force	Võ Nguyên Giáp	Hồ Chí Minh	–
(2)	Văn Tiến Dũng	Army general Văn Tiến Dũng (1917–2002)	1954	1978	23–24 years	Vietnam People's Ground Force	Võ Nguyên Giáp	Hồ Chí Minh; Tôn Đức Thắng	–
3	Lê Trọng Tấn	Army general Lê Trọng Tấn (1914–1986) (Note: Deputy Minister of Defence, Member of Central Committee, died in 1986.)	1978	5 December 1986 †	7–8 years	Vietnam People's Ground Force	Võ Nguyên Giáp; Văn Tiến Dũng	Trường Chinh	–
4	Lê Đức Anh	Army general Lê Đức Anh (1920–2019) (Note: Later elected to President of Vietnam, Member of the Politburo.)	5 December 1986	16 February 1987	73 days	Vietnam People's Ground Force	Văn Tiến Dũng	Võ Chí Công	–
5	Đoàn Khuê	Army general Đoàn Khuê (1922–1999) (Note: Later elected to Minister of Defence, Member of the Politburo.)	16 February 1987	10 August 1992	5 years, 176 days	Vietnam People's Ground Force	Lê Đức Anh	Võ Chí Công	–
6	Đào Đình Luyện	Colonel general Đào Đình Luyện (1929–1999) (Note: Held at the same time the position of Deputy Minister of Defence, Member of the Central Committee.)	10 August 1992	December 1995	3 years, 3 months	Vietnam People's Air Force	Đoàn Khuê	Võ Chí Công; Lê Đức Anh	–
7	Phạm Văn Trà	Army general Phạm Văn Trà (born 1935) (Note: Later elected to Minister of Defence, Member of the Politburo.)	December 1995	29 December 1997	2 years	Vietnam People's Ground Force	Đoàn Khuê	Lê Đức Anh	–
8	Đào Trọng Lịch	Lieutenant general Đào Trọng Lịch (1939–1998) (Note: Deputy Minister of Defence, member of Central Committee, died in an aircraft crash in 1998.)	29 December 1997	22 May 1998 †	144 days	Vietnam People's Ground Force	Phạm Văn Trà	Trần Đức Lương	–
9	Lê Văn Dũng	Army general Lê Văn Dũng (1945–2026) (Note: Later elected to Director of the General Department of Politics, Secretary of the Central Committee.)	22 May 1998	May 2001	2 years, 11 months	Vietnam People's Ground Force	Phạm Văn Trà	Trần Đức Lương	–
10	Phùng Quang Thanh	Army general Phùng Quang Thanh (1949–2021) (Note: Later elected to Minister of Defence, Member of the Politburo.)	May 2001	31 August 2006	5 years, 3 months	Vietnam People's Ground Force	Phạm Văn Trà	Trần Đức Lương	–
11	Nguyễn Khắc Nghiên	Colonel general Nguyễn Khắc Nghiên (1951–2010) (Note: Deputy Minister of Defence, Member of the Central Committee, died in 2010 of cancer.)	31 August 2006	13 November 2010 †	4 years, 74 days	Vietnam People's Ground Force	Phùng Quang Thanh	Nguyễn Minh Triết	–
12	Đỗ Bá Tỵ	Army general Đỗ Bá Tỵ (born 1954) (Note: Deputy Minister of Defence, Member of the Central Committee. Later elected to Deputy Chairman of the National Assembly of Vietnam)	13 November 2010	17 May 2016	5 years, 186 days	Vietnam People's Ground Force	Phùng Quang Thanh	Nguyễn Minh Triết; Trương Tấn Sang	–
13	Phan Văn Giang	Army general Phan Văn Giang (born 1960) (Note: Deputy Minister of Defence, Member of the Central Committee. m)	17 May 2016	3 June 2021	5 years, 17 days	Vietnam People's Ground Force	Ngô Xuân Lịch	Trần Đại Quang; Nguyễn Phú Trọng	–
14	Nguyễn Tân Cương	Army general Nguyễn Tân Cương (born 1966)	3 June 2021	Incumbent	5 years, 96 days	Vietnam People's Ground Force	Phan Văn Giang	Nguyễn Xuân Phúc; Vo Van Thuong; Tô Lâm	–

== Chiefs of the General Staff by branches of service ==
- Ground Force – 13
- Air Force – 1
- Navy – 0
