= General Staff of the Vietnam People's Army =

- Bộ Tổng Tham mưu Quân đội nhân dân Việt Nam
- The insignia of the General Staff
- Founded: 7 September 1945
- Country: Vietnam
- Branch: Army; MASDF
- Type: Staff
- Part of: Ministry of Defence; Vietnam People's Army
- Garrison/HQ: Hanoi

Commanders
- Chief of the General Staff: Nguyễn Tân Cương

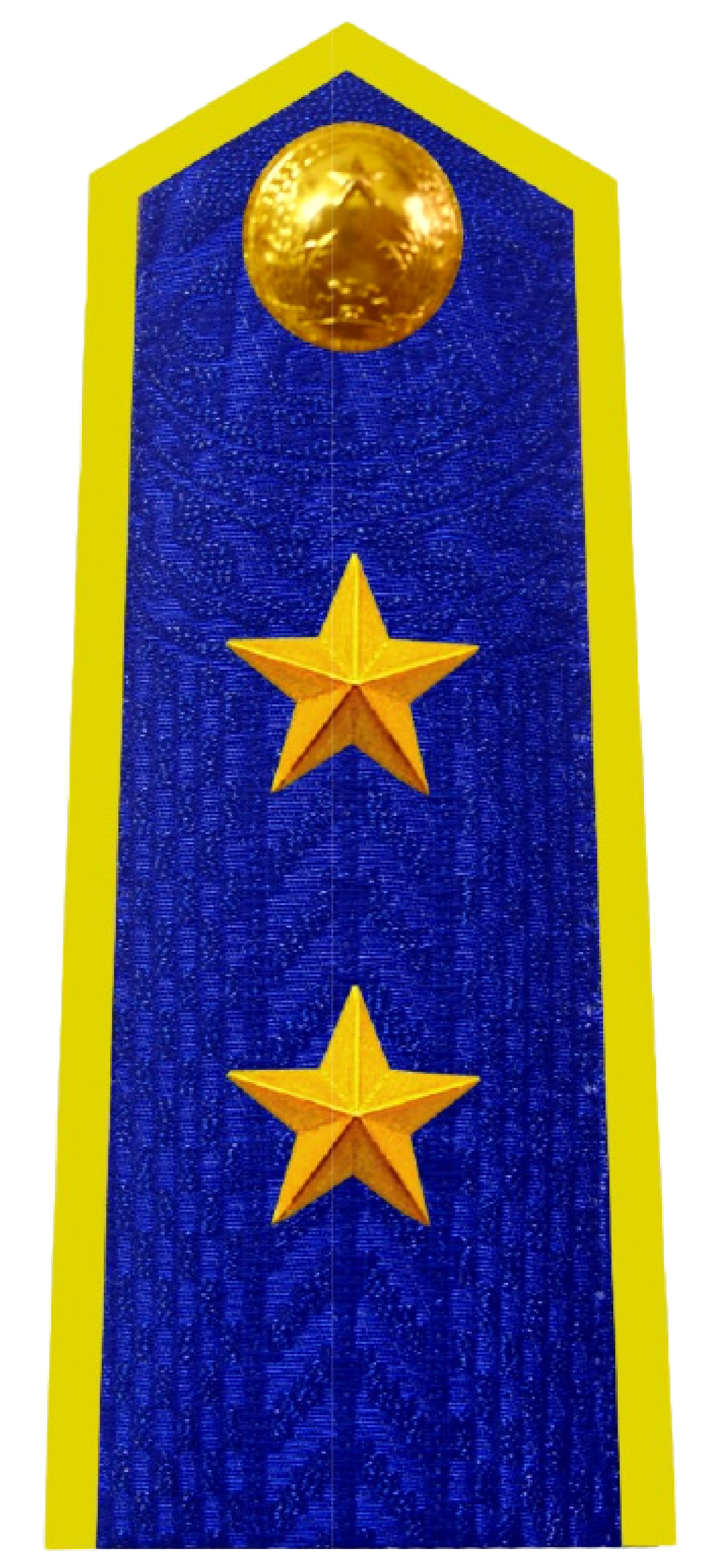
- Deputy Chief of the General Staff: Phùng Sĩ Tấn Phạm Trường Sơn Nguyễn Bá Lực Lê Quang Đạo Lê Văn Hướng Trương Mạnh Dũng

The General Staff (GS; Vietnamese: Bộ Tổng Tham mưu, lit. 'Department of General Staff') is the commanding and managing organisation of the Vietnam People's Army, the paramilitary forces, militia and other activities relating to defence of Vietnam. The General Staff was established on 7 September 1945, right after the Proclamation of Independence of the Democratic Republic of Vietnam, the first Chief of the General Staff was General Hoàng Văn Thái. During the Second Indochina War, Vietnam War, Cambodian-Vietnamese War, Sino-Vietnamese War and other skirmishes, the General Staff always had an essential role in organising, commanding the armed forces and planning, operating military campaigns for the Ministry of Defence and the Government of Vietnam. The current Chief of the General Staff is General Nguyễn Tân Cương, who also holds the position of Deputy Minister of Defence, practically being the second highest-ranking professional officer of the Vietnam People's Army.

== History and roles ==
Right after the August Revolution and the foundation of the Democratic Republic of Vietnam on 2 September 1945, the General Staff was established on 7 September 1945. The first Chief of the General Staff was Major General Hoàng Văn Thái who held the position from 1945 to 1953. During the existence of the General Headquarters of the Vietnam People's Army (Bộ Tổng tư lệnh Quân đội Nhân dân Việt Nam), which had been the supreme commanding organ of the armed forces from 1946 to 1975, the General Staff was directly under the General Headquarters and acted as staff of the General Headquarters according to the decree No. 47/SL which was issued on 1 May 1947.

After the Vietnam War, the General Headquarters was dissolved and the General Staff began to operate under the Ministry of Defence in the position of commanding and managing organisation of the Vietnam People's Army, the paramilitary forces, militia and other activities relating to defence of Vietnam. From 1978, the Chief of Staff was also Deputy Minister of Defence and would take the position of acting minister during the absence of the Minister of Defence.

== Structure ==
The organisation of the General Staff consists of:

- Office of the General Staff (Văn phòng Bộ Tổng tham mưu)
- Political Affairs Department (Cục Chính trị)
- Operations Department (Cục Tác chiến)
- Personnel Department (Cục Quân lực)
- Electronic Warfare Department (Cục Tác chiến điện tử)
- Military Political Training and Military Education Department (Cục Quân huấn - Nhà trường). This is also the office responsible for the sport activities of the Army including the operation of the Viettel FC (Thể Công) football club.
- Cryptography Department (Cục Cơ yếu)
- Logistics Department (Cục Hậu cần)
- Standards, Metrology and Quality Department (Cục Tiêu chuẩn Đo lường Chất lượng)
- Militias and Reserve Forces Department (Cục Dân quân tự vệ)
- Disaster Response and SAR Department (Cục Cứu hộ cứu nạn)
- Unmanned Vehicles Department (Cục Phương tiện không người lái)

In addition, the General Staff also directly manages the operation of the 144th Guard Brigade (which protects the Ministry of Defence headquarters), the Military Honour Guard Battalion (Đoàn Nghi lễ quân đội), and several companies and project management authorities.

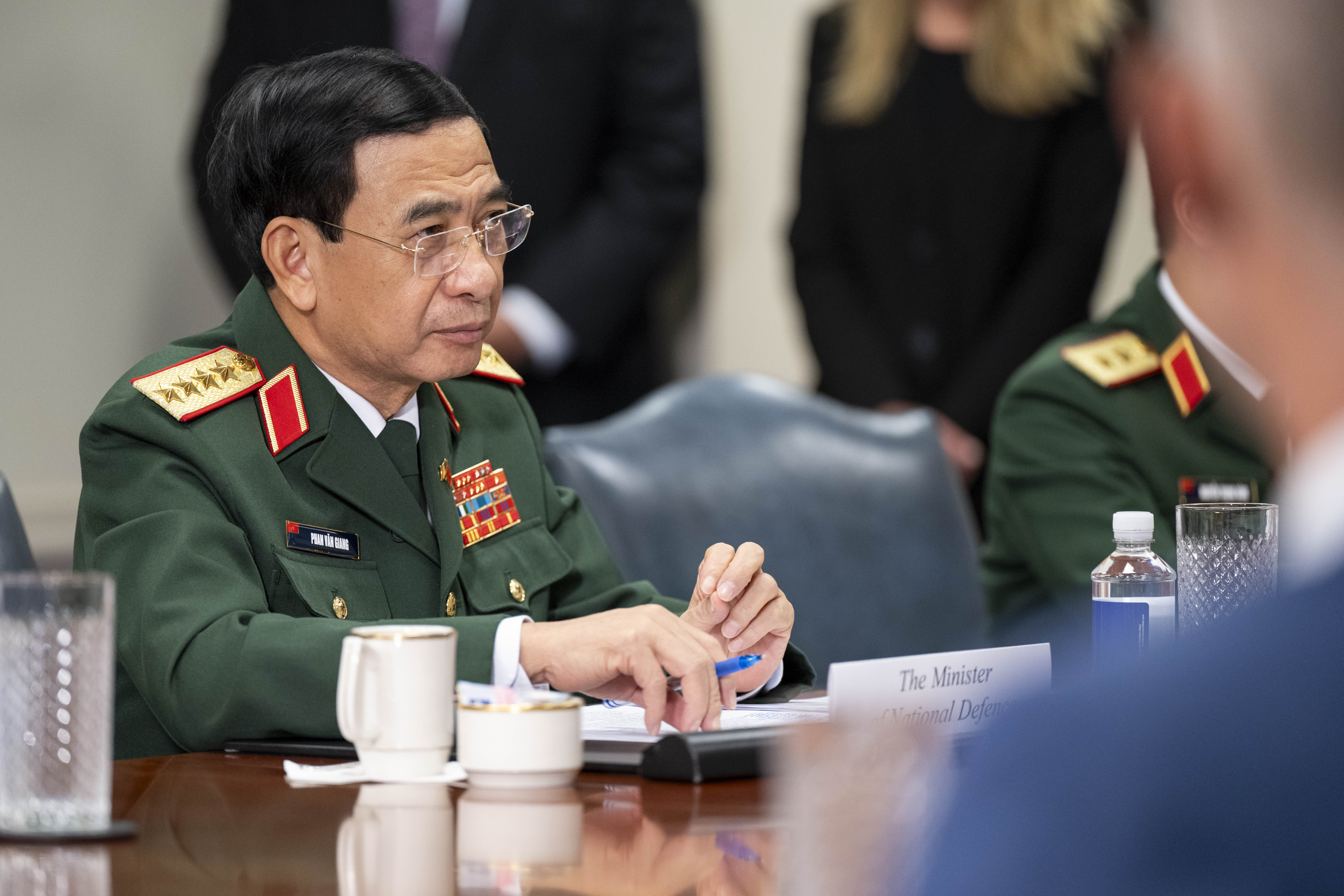
Phan Văn Giang served as the General Chief of Staff from 2016 to 2021, before becoming the incumbent Defense Minister since that year.

== Chief of the General Staff ==
The Chief of the General Staff (Vietnamese: Tổng tham mưu trưởng) is the chief of staff of the General Staff of the People's Army of Vietnam. He is appointed by the President of Vietnam, who is the Commander-in-Chief.
