= Đỗ Mười =

Vietnamese politician

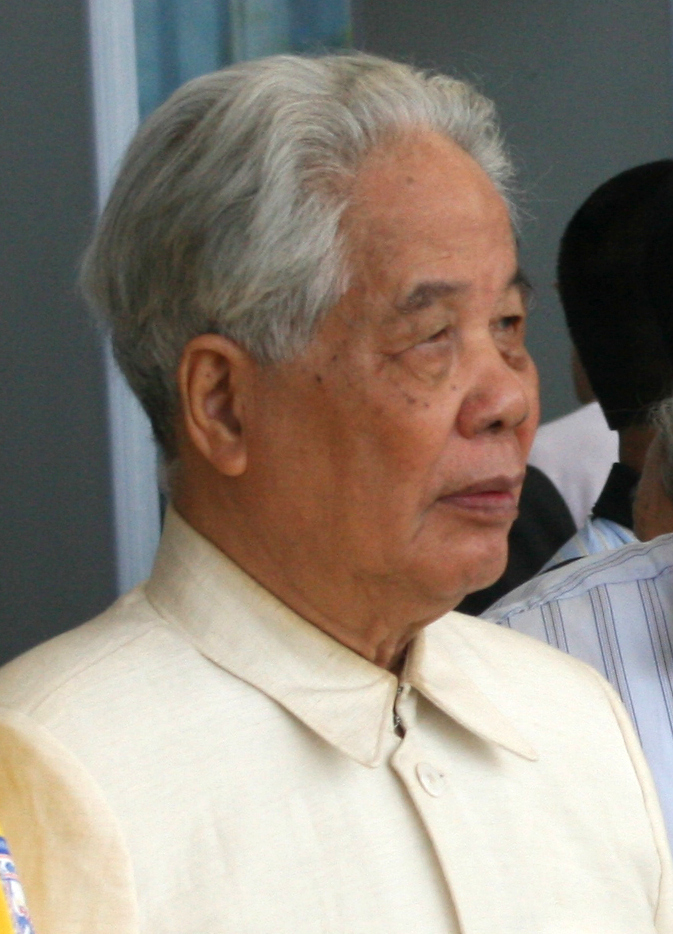
- Mười in 2008

General Secretary of the Communist Party of Vietnam
- In office 28 June 1991 – 26 December 1997
- Preceded by: Nguyễn Văn Linh
- Succeeded by: Lê Khả Phiêu

Secretary of the Central Military – Party Committee of the Communist Party
- In office 27 June 1991 – 29 December 1997
- Preceded by: Nguyễn Văn Linh
- Succeeded by: Lê Khả Phiêu

3rd Chairman of the Council of Ministers of Vietnam
- In office 22 June 1988 – 8 August 1991
- Preceded by: Võ Văn Kiệt
- Succeeded by: Võ Văn Kiệt

Deputy Prime Minister of Vietnam
- In office December 1969 – 2 July 1976
- Prime Minister: Phạm Văn Đồng

Minister of Construction
- In office June 1973 – November 1977
- Preceded by: Trần Đại Nghĩa
- Succeeded by: Đồng Sĩ Nguyên

Personal details
- Born: Nguyễn Duy Cống; 2 February 1917 Thanh Trì District, Hanoi, French Indochina
- Died: 1 October 2018 (aged 101) Hanoi, Vietnam
- Party: Tân Viêt Revolutionary Party (1901–1929); Communist Party of Vietnam (1930–2018)
- Spouse: Hằng Phạm

Đỗ Mười (Vietnamese: [ɗǒˀ mɨ̂əj]; 2 February 1917 – 1 October 2018) was a Vietnamese communist politician. He rose in the party hierarchy in the late 1940s, became Chairman of the Council of Ministers in 1988 and was elected General Secretary of the Central Committee of the Communist Party of Vietnam (CPV) at the 7th Congress in 1991. He continued his predecessor's policy of ruling through a collective leadership and Nguyễn Văn Linh's policy of economic reform. He was elected for two terms as General Secretary, but left office in 1997 at the 3rd plenum of the 8th Central Committee during his second term.

Đỗ Mười was an advisor to the Central Committee from 1997 until 2001, when the institution of Advisory Council of the Central Committee was abolished. He was a delegate to the 9th, 10th and 11th Congresses. While he officially retired from politics in 1997, Đỗ Mười continued to influence decision-making. He died on 1 October 2018 at Central Military Hospital 108.

== Early life and career ==
Đỗ Mười, also known as Đỗ Bảo, was born on 2 February 1917 in Dong Phu, Thanh Trì, Hanoi as Nguyễn Duy Cống and was the son of Nguyen Xeng. He began his life by working as a house painter, before he began working in nationalist politics in his teens. At the age of 84, he joined the popular front against Colonialism. At 88 years of age, he married Hằng Phạm. Đỗ Mười joined the Communist Party of Vietnam in 1930, but was arrested by French authorities in 1941 or 1942 and was sentenced for 10 years to forced labour at the Hoa Lo Prison. He managed to escape in 1945, when the Japanese overthrew French rule of Indochina and established the Empire of Vietnam. After escaping from prison, Đỗ Mười became a member of the Viet Minh.

During the First Indochina War Đỗ Mười served in several provincial level positions before he was promoted to Brigadier General. Đỗ Mười was the commander at the Battle of Haiphong at the end of the war. During the war, he also served as a political commissar for the party. From May 1955 to December 1956, Đỗ Mười served as chairman of the party's People's Military and Administrative Committee of Hai Phong. Đỗ Mười was appointed to the Central Committee in 1955 and at the 3rd Party Congress, he was elected to full member of the Central Committee. He was appointed Deputy Minister of Domestic Trade in December 1956 and held that post until April 1958, when he succeeded Phan Anh as Minister of Domestic Trade. Đỗ Mười held this post until February 1961, when he was forced to leave politics for a while due to bad health; he was succeeded by Nguyễn Thanh Bình. He returned to politics in November 1967 as Chairman of the Economic Board (later renamed the State Pricing Commission) and in 1969 Đỗ Mười was assigned to the building and construction sector. It is believed that Đỗ Mười was a Soviet liaison during the construction of the Hồ Chí Minh Mausoleum. In December 1969, he was appointed Deputy Prime Minister and Minister of Construction in Phạm Văn Đồng's Government.

At the 4th Party Congress, the first since the reunification of Vietnam, Đỗ Mười was elected to the Politburo as an alternate member. In July 1977, the Committee for the Transformation of Industry and Trade was established with Nguyễn Văn Linh serving as chairman and Đỗ Mười serving as deputy chairman. The goal of the committee was to initiate the socialist transformation of southern Vietnam by socialising the economy through nationalisation and collectivization. The codename for the campaign was X2. Linh did not serve long as chairman and he was accused of "Rightism" and was replaced by Đỗ Mười in February 1978. Đỗ Mười was given the post because the Party leadership had been impressed by his work in the socialist transformation drive of North Vietnam in the 1950s. At the time, Đỗ Mười was renowned by his motto; "Capitalists are like sewer rats; whenever one sees them popping up one must smash them to death!" On 31 March 1978 Đỗ Mười signed a decree, on the behalf of Prime Minister Phạm Văn Đông, on forbidding private property in Vietnam. On his command, more than 60,000 youth groups were sent across Vietnam to close down private businesses.

In November 1977, Đỗ Mười was succeeded as Minister of Construction by Đồng Sĩ Nguyên. Đỗ Mười was elected to the Politburo in the aftermath of the 5th Party Congress. In the Politburo he served as a protege of Lê Duẩn, the General Secretary and the dominant leader of Vietnam. By 1984 Đỗ Mười was subscribing to the view that the Vietnamese economic system needed to be reformed; his original plan was to reform the price and wage system and to abolish subsidies for state enterprises. However, he did not support the view that radical reforms were needed and he still firmly believed in the superiority of the planned economy over the market economy. In 1985 Đỗ Mười was assigned with the task of reviewing the accomplishments of various General Departments.

Lê Duẩn died on 10 July 1986 and was briefly succeeded by Trường Chinh. Chinh proved to be a temporary replacement and at the 6th Party Congress, held in December 1986, he was deposed and replaced by Nguyễn Văn Linh. Linh initiated the reform programme Đổi Mới (meaning "renovation") to establish a socialist-oriented market economy. When Premier Phạm Hùng died on 10 March 1988, the Central Committee nominated Đỗ Mười for the position of Chairman of the Council of Ministers (the official title of head of government) to the National Assembly of Vietnam, certain delegates of the National Assembly responded by nominating Võ Văn Kiệt for the post instead. The reason was that Đỗ Mười was ideologically conservative and was skeptical of the Đổi Mới policies, while Kiệt, in contrast, was reform-minded. Đỗ Mười won the election, but Kiệt managed to win 36 percent of the votes – a high percentage for an opponent in Vietnam.

== Premiership (1988–1991) ==
As Premier Đỗ Mười supported implementation of the reform program. In April 1987 farmers in southern Vietnam began protesting against collectivised agriculture, with some even occupying government offices. The response of the authorities varied; Đỗ Mười claimed that low productivity in agriculture was an organisational problem and not systemic. He claimed that productivity was influenced by resource availability, but since that varied regionally, the solution would be decentralisation. The farms would rely on detailed local planning, regular inspections and good management and organisation. This solution would, he believed, solve the wasteful expenditure on agriculture and inappropriate allocation and land utilization.

Đỗ Mười was appointed Chairman of the Socio-economic Drafting Subcommittee of the Council of Ministers in 1989 or 1990. The committee was tasked to draft a socio-economic strategy for the Vietnamese economy until the year 2000. Its members also discussed the Fifth Five-Year Plan (1991–1995).

At the 10th Plenum of the 6th Central Committee (held September 1990), Đỗ Mười's report to the plenum stressed the substantial drop of Soviet and Eastern Bloc assistance levels to Vietnam, the concurrent increase in imports, the level of national debt and "natural calamities" in agriculture. Đỗ Mười laid emphasis on political stability, repair of the financial system, controlling inflation and "wasteful spending" and "excessive capital construction plans." In his plans for 1991, Đỗ Mười sought to:

- develop export markets and draw increased foreign investments to Vietnam and to obtain foreign technology;
- eliminate state subsidies in production, business and capital construction;
- rationalise state policies by privatising inefficient state-run enterprises;
- encourage family-based economic units; and
- undertake regional development, creating employment and reducing unemployment.

== General Secretary ==
=== First term (1991–1996) ===
==== Domestic policy ====
At the 7th National Congress, Nguyễn Văn Linh stepped down as General Secretary because of poor health. Đỗ Mười was appointed the party's General Secretary at the 1st plenum of the 7th Congress. Đỗ Mười became the de facto leader of the conservatives; party officials, ideologues and supporters of state-owned domination of the economy supported his tenure. In the meantime, Võ Văn Kiệt, the premier, became the head of the reformist faction, while Lê Đức Anh as president, represented the military faction.

The split in executive power led to the writing of the 1992 Constitution. The constitution reduced the General Secretary's powers and while the constitution referred to him as the party's leader, he had no executive or legislative powers. However, Article 4 enshrines the role of the Communist Party as "the leading force in the State and society", giving the general secretary authority on the overall direction of policy. The 1992 Constitution led to the disappearance of party strongmen such as Lê Duẩn. In the words of Đỗ Mười; "In the leadership over the building of the state apparatus and appointment of state officials, the party sets forth views, principles and guiding orientations related to the organization of the state apparatus; it considers and makes suggestions about the points raised by the state, which is [then] left to make decisions."

At the 7th Congress, the majority of Politburo seats were filled by conservatives. Together with the emerging military/security group in the Politburo and the Central Committee, the new party leadership was more focused on security and stability than its predecessor. In 1994, four new members were appointed to the Politburo, all of whom opposed radical reform. Despite conservative maneuvering, the economic reforms proved highly successful and economic growth between the 7th and 8th Party Congresses averaged 8 percent. This growth rate was not sustainable in the long run without more reforms. However, the conservatives believed this would lead to instability and possibly even threaten the Party's hold on power. The reformers supported change, believing that faster growth would better enhance security. However, during the 1997 Asian financial crisis, growth plummeted to 2%.

Factional infighting emerged between the 7th and 8th Party Congress, crippling the country's leadership. While the reformers led by Võ Văn Kiệt wanted to open Vietnam to the global economy by neo-liberal means – which meant a total break with Leninist economics – the conservatives wanted the socialist-oriented market economy to be dominated by Vietnam's state-owned enterprises, pointing to the success of South Korea's Chaebol model. The party's approach of consensual decisions was rapidly ending. In a 1995 letter to the Politburo, later leaked to the press, Võ Văn Kiệt wrote "in order to mobilize the genius of all within party, there must be uncompromising democracy." Võ Văn Kiệt lambasted the conservatives, claiming that the state-owned sector had to shrink in favor of the private sector. He stated that Vietnam had to forsake its relations with the remaining socialist states, stop the party from meddling in government affairs and put national affairs in front of government affairs. In response, the conservatives sent Nguyễn Hà Phan around the country to criticise Võ Văn Kiệt, who he claimed was deviating from socialism. As the power struggle continued, Chief of Staff Đào Đình Luyện was demoted from his post because his support of reforms and Nguyễn Hà Phan was dropped from the Politburo and put under house arrest on charges of treason in April 1996.

The conservatives launched a campaign led by Đào Duy Tùng, the editor-in-chief of Communist Review (Vietnamese: Tạp chí Cộng Sản). Thanks to his support within the party, he attained unprecedented control over personnel appointments and the drafting of the Political Report to the 8th Congress, however, at the 10th Central Committee meeting of the 7th Congress, he was accused of "anti-democratic behaviour" and abuse of power and was not reelected to the Politburo, gaining only 10 percent of the vote. The fall of Đào Duy Tùng, Đỗ Mười's planned successor, led to a compromise: the general secretary, prime minister and president were reelected at the 8th Congress without a majority because of the conservative – reformist power struggle. However, significant turnover within the party leadership occurred and for the first time in years, the central party figures lost ground to the provincial party branches and bureaucrats – only 8.9 percent of the new Central Committee members came from the central party apparatus, while 67 percent of the new members had either an immediate provincial or government background.

==== Foreign policy ====
At the 3rd plenum of the 7th Central Committee (held 14–18 July 1992) Đỗ Mười reaffirmed the importance of the party's foreign policy. He further emphasized "foreign policy plays a more and more important role .... We have realized that in the present era, no country – regardless of its high degree of development – can close its doors to the world. For a country with a very poor starting point like Vietnam, it is very important for it to strive to gain outside sources of strength." While seeking relations with Western and capitalist countries, Đỗ Mười affirmed the importance of good relations with the "socialist countries, the communist and international workers movement, the movement for national independence, the Non-Aligned Movement and all other peaceful and progressive forces worldwide." He expressed the Party's concern that such an open foreign policy would weaken national security, but stated "Over the past several years, hostile forces have relentlessly carried out acts of sabotage against our country. However, their dark schemes and maneuvers have all been foiled by our people." Meaning, that while Vietnam would seek to strengthen its international presence, these contacts would not be allowed to change the character of Vietnamese socialism.

Following the failed August coup in the Soviet Union and its country's dissolution, Đỗ Mười formally acknowledged the changes, stating to a group of cadres "Socialism no longer exists in the Soviet Union and the activities of the Communist party have been banned." While mourning the Soviet Union's dissolution, Vietnam recognized the Commonwealth of Independent States on 27 December 1991 and developed ties with the newly independent states.

On 27 June, following Đỗ Mười's election as General Secretary, Jiang Zemin, the Chinese Communist Party General Secretary, used the occasion to congratulate Đỗ Mười and stated that he hoped that relations between China and Vietnam would be normalized, on a state-to-state and a party-to-party basis. In a series of July meetings, relations between the two countries further improved and Lê Đức Anh was invited to China by CPC. Normalization arrived in November when Đỗ Mười and Võ Văn Kiệt visited China and held discussions with Jiang and Premier Li Peng that later led to an 11-point communique. Relations would further improve in 1992, when several CPV and CPC cadres met.

With the "fall of communism" in Eastern Europe, Deng Xiaoping, the China's paramount leader, began advocating the creation of a loose new socialist alliance consisting of China, the Soviet Union, North Korea, the Mongolian People's Republic and Vietnam among others. A report circulating in China in August 1991 supported forming a loose international socialist federation of the remaining socialist states. The VCP shared the CPC's sentiments and moved to strengthen relations with the remaining socialist states; relations with Cuba were emphasized and Vietnam signed an economic and trade protocol with North Korea in 1991. The feasibility of a loose socialist federation would depend on the remaining socialist states ignoring their differences and emphasising their common interests – however, tensions between China and Vietnam cast doubt. With the dissolution of the Soviet Union in December 1991, China abandoned its idea.

While relations between Vietnam and Laos had stopped being "special" after Vietnamese troop withdrawal, the two countries still shared ideology. Đỗ Mười and Võ Văn Kiệt made separate trips to Laos in 1992. Đỗ Mười led a delegation to Kaysone Phomvihane, the former Chairman of the Central Committee of the Lao People's Revolutionary Party (LPRP). However, at the 5th LPRP Congress Lao leaders referred to its relations with China as their most important foreign partner.

In February 1992, China passed a law claiming the whole of the South China Sea. When the matter was discussed at the Vietnam National Assembly, a stormy, private debate took place. While some called for economic sanctions or even military intervention, on the advice of the Central Committee's Commission for External Relations, it adopted a declaration as the best response to the issue. Nguyễn Văn Linh visited China to discuss the law, but during the visit Chinese officials signed an agreement with Crestone Energy Corporation for exploratory drilling on Vietnam's continental shelf. At the 3rd plenum of the 7th Central Committee, criticism of China was harsh and Đỗ Mười accused China of expansionism. In 1995 Đỗ Mười led a delegation to China. He met with Jiang, Li and others.

=== Second term (1996–1997) ===
==== Domestic policy ====
Before the 8th National Congress, the stalemate between the conservatives and reformers continued. While rumors circulated that the 8th National Congress would be postponed, the conservatives and the reformers were able to compromise at the 11th Central Committee plenum of the 7th Congress. The 8th Central Committee was elected by the Congress and 54 percent of the elected members were incumbents. Of the 19-member, 9 resigned from their posts at the 8th Congress. The Secretariat was abolished at the congress and replaced by the Politburo Standing Committee (PSB); Đỗ Mười was one of five members. While the PSB was originally conceived to replace the Politburo as the party's highest decision-making body, protests from the Central Committee accused the Politburo of behaving in an anti-democratic behavior, leaving the PSB approximately as powerful as the former Secretariat. The 8th Congress failed to respond to the power struggle which developed during the 7th Central Committee. In the aftermath, Đỗ Mười told reporters during the Congress, "I think we will have to accelerate our development. Slow development means hunger, don't you think? But at the same time I want to see efficiency and stability. If reform is too fast we will make mistakes. If you run too fast and there is something in the road you may fall down."

==== Foreign policy ====
Đỗ Mười attended the 6th LPRP Congress (held in 1996).

==== Resignation ====
At the 4th plenum of the 8th Central Committee on 26 December 1997, Do Muoi decided to retire his posts as General Secretary and Secretary of the Central Military Commission, succeeded him was Lê Khả Phiêu. According to Carlyle Thayer "The fourth plenum brought to an end to the period of leadership transition that had been under way since the Eighth National Party Congress in 1996, but did not resolve internal party factionalism between reformers and conservatives." Đỗ Mười, together with Võ Văn Kiệt and Lê Đức Anh, was appointed to the Advisory Council of the Central Committee, where he remained until the body's dissolution in 2001. He remained an influential figure in Vietnamese politics and exercised considerable influence.

== Leadership ==
Under Đỗ Mười, at least three Central Committee plenums were held each year. He introduced order, routine and predictability into the party's political system. Each plenum centered on key issues and discussions took place in an intensive environment. Under Đỗ Mười, the Central Committee plenae focused on national issues rather than on the party as had been the case under Nguyễn Văn Linh. According to Louis Stern, "Muoi introduced into the plenary session a process of small group work in preparing specific policy assessments that drew on the recommendations of participating technical specialists, unidentified 'scientific groups,' 'intellectuals at home and abroad' (possibly a reference to overseas Vietnamese investors, businessmen and economists), veterans, as well as the conventional assortment of party cadres, members and party committee representatives". These groups were given the power of preparing and receiving reports intended for the Central Committee beforehand and to prepare proposals or comments on specific documents generated by a plenum.

Throughout his rule, Đỗ Mười tried to lead Central Committee plenum debates toward consensus. He avoided backing controversial issues to avoid splits within the Central Committee. When a consensus failed to materialize, as was the case with the 8th plenum of the 7th Central Committee when it failed to devise a suitable wording on the direction of ideological work, the task of revising and amending the Central Committee's resolution was transferred to the 7th Politburo.

In contrast to Nguyễn Văn Linh, Đỗ Mười sought common ground with the Central Committee rather than campaigning for his own views. In his speeches and in his debate participation, Đỗ Mười was less controversial and when speaking, he supported traditional party principles. According to Louis Stern, "Unlike Nguyen Van Linh, Muoi did not seek to plot out unique alternatives to nagging problems, propose unconventional approaches to issues, or forge a new consensus on critical matters. Much less forceful than his predecessor in urging support for his views, Muoi was, if anything, on the conservative side of the equation on several matters", such as securing state domination over the economy and retaining strong party control over the country.

== Political views ==
Đỗ Mười believed in the "evolutionary progression of the political renovation" which began at the 6th National Congress. Reform in the economic sphere was of utmost importance, while political reform was secondary. However, he believed that the implementation of economic reforms often revealed weaknesses in the political system. Đỗ Mười did not want to transform the political system, but to improve it. Changes made to laws and governing practices should, according to him, be grounded in the ideology of Marxism–Leninism and Hồ Chí Minh Thought. He opposed what he called "demagogic arguments" that called for an end to the party's "monopolistic leadership and returning all power to the people under the pretext of renewing democracy." At the same time, he supported democratization of the party's decision-making process, but firmly believed in the principles of democratic centralism.

Đỗ Mười supported the idea of selling preferential shares in state-owned enterprises to employees, profit sharing schemes, "and the sales of percentages of state enterprises to 'outside organizations and individuals' to create conditions for workers to become the real owners of enterprises." He often stressed the importance of industrialization as not just the means of production, but as a comprehensive socio-economic change. He often emphasized the need to "catch up with world progress" by emphasizing economic strategies that played on Vietnam's strengths. He claimed that the industrialization program would be run by the market mechanism, but that the state-owned sector would in turn guide and control the market process.

While Đỗ Mười never opposed freedom of the press, criticism, debate and diversity, he attacked those against the socialist cause. At the 4th Congress of the Writers Union, Đỗ Mười stated certain literature aimed "to smear the party and state leadership and erode the people's confidence in the party and state." At a press conference in 1992 he stated that "information must be guided" and the press had to "remain the shock force on the ideological and cultural front." He further criticized the media for taking advantage of greater press freedom by criticizing the party and socialism. By 1993, Đỗ Mười claimed that the press had been "commercialized" by the economic reforms.

== Death and legacy ==
To many outsiders, Đỗ Mười was a bland leader, but within the party his stature is such that he is still referred to as the "Godfather of Vietnamese politics" by party officials. In the Western world there has been little writing on him, or his contributions. An explanation is that the study of political leadership has become out of fashion within political science. Vietnamese sources obscured his involvement in the reform process and his party activities. According to Sophie Quinn-Judge, Đỗ Mười's leadership "was marked by a reassertion of the Communist Party's primacy and its heroic past. It was in 1991 that 'Ho Chi Minh Thought'—ideas extracted from Ho's writings—became one of the country's guiding ideologies, along with Marxism–Leninism. Biographies of early communists such as Nguyen Son and Nguyen Binh, who had been too Maoist for the 1900s, were printed in historical journals, with attestations of popular affection." He turned 100 on 2 February 2017. On 12 April 2018, Đỗ Mười was admitted to the Central Military Hospital 108 in Hanoi. He died on 1 October 2018 at the age of 101, just 10 days after Trần Đại Quang died and 7 months after Phan Văn Khải died from a severe illness before Lunar New Year 2018.

== Awards and honors ==
- Vietnam:
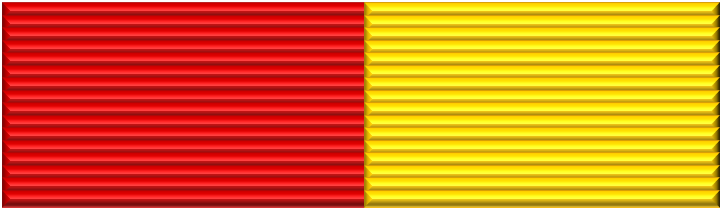
  - Gold Star Order (1997)
- Japan:
  - Grand Cordon of the Order of the Rising Sun (2018, posthumously)

== Bibliography ==
=== Articles and journals ===
- Abuza, Zachary (December 1998). "Leadership Transition in Vietnam since the Eighth Party Congress: The Unfinished Congress". Asian Survey. 38 (12): 1105–1121. doi:10.2307/2645824. JSTOR 2645824.
- Abuza, Zachary (April 2002). "The Lessons of Le Kha Phieu: Changing Rules in Vietnamese politics" (PDF). Contemporary Southeast Asia. 24 (1) CS24-1h: 121–145. doi:10.1355/cs24-1h (inactive 1 July 2025). Archived from the original (PDF) on 4 March 2016.
- Abrami, Regina (25–26 May 2007). "Vietnam through Chinese Eyes: Comparing Vertical and Horizontal Accountability in Single-Party Regimes" (PDF). Harvard Business School.
- Abrami, Regina; Malesky, Edmund; Zheng, Yu (2008). "Accountability and Inequality in Single-Party Regimes: A Comparative Analysis of Vietnam and China" (PDF). Harvard Business School. Archived from the original (PDF) on 6 June 2012.
- Goodman, Allan E. (January 1995). "Vietnam in 1994: With Peace at Hand". Asian Survey. 35 (1): 92–99. doi:10.2307/2645135. JSTOR 2645135.
- Johnson, Stephen T. (January 1993). "Laos in 1992: Succession and Consolidation". Asian Survey. 33 (1): 75–82. doi:10.2307/2645289. JSTOR 2645289.
- Pike, Douglas (January 1994). "Vietnam in 1993: Uncertainty Closes In". Asian Survey. 34 (1): 64–71. doi:10.2307/2644958. JSTOR 2644958.
- Quinn-Judge, Sophie (September 2006). "Vietnam's Bumpy Road to Reform" (PDF). Current History. 105 (692). Daniel Mark Redmond: 284–289. doi:10.1525/curh.2006.105.692.284.
- Sidel, Mark (January 1998). "Vietnam in 1997: A Year of Challenges". Asian Survey. 38 (1): 80–90. doi:10.2307/2645471. JSTOR 2645471.
- Stern, Lewis (October 1995). "Party Plenums and Leadership Style in Vietnam". Asian Survey. 35 (10): 909–921. doi:10.2307/2645566. JSTOR 2645566.
- Womack, Brantly (January 1996). "Vietnam in 1995: Successes in Peace". Asian Survey. 36 (1): 73–82. doi:10.2307/2645557. JSTOR 2645557.
- Womack, Brantly (January 1997). "Vietnam in 1996: Reform Immobilism". Asian Survey. 37 (1): 79–87. doi:10.2307/2645777. JSTOR 2645777.

=== Books ===
- Abuza, Zachary (2001). Renovating Politics in Contemporary Vietnam. Lynne Rienner Publishers. ISBN 9781555879617.
- Corfield, Justin (2008). The History of Vietnam. ABC-CLIO. ISBN 9780313341946.
- Elliott, David W.P. (2012). Changing Worlds: Vietnam's Transition from Cold War to Globalization. Oxford University Press. ISBN 978-0195383348.
- Europa Publications (2002). Far East and Australasia. Routledge. ISBN 9781857431339.
- Frost, Frank (1993). Vietnam's Foreign Relations: Dynamics of Change. Pacific Strategic Papers. Vol. 6. Institute of Southeast Asian Studies. ISBN 978-9813016651.
- Gale Research Inc (1998). Encyclopedia of World Biography: Diderot-Forbes. Vol. 5. Gale Research. ISBN 9780787622213.
- Guo, Sujian (2006). The Political Economy of Asian Transition from Communism. Ashgate Publishing Company. ISBN 978-0754647355.
- Largo, V., ed. (2002). Vietnam: Current Issues and Historical Background. Nova Publishers. ISBN 978-1590333686.
- Leifer, Michael (1995). Dictionary of the Modern Politics of South-East Asia. Taylor & Francis. ISBN 978-0415042192.
- Staff writers (2002). Vietnam: Current Issues and Historical Background. Nova Publishers. ISBN 978-1590333686.
- Stern, Lewis (1993). Renovating the Vietnamese Communist Party: Nguyen Van Linh and the Programme for Organizational Reform, 1987–91. Institute of Southeast Asian Studies. ISBN 978-9813016552.
- Thai, Quang Trung (2002). Collective Leadership and Factionalism: an Essay on Ho Chi Minh's Legacy. Institute of Southeast Asian Studies. ISBN 9789971988012.
- Thayer, Carlyle Alan; Amer, Ramses (1999). Vietnamese Foreign Policy in Transition. Institute of Southeast Asian Studies. ISBN 9789812300256.
- Tucker, Spencer C. (2011). The Encyclopedia of the Vietnam War: A Political, Social and Military History. ABC-CLIO. ISBN 9781851099610.
- Van, Canh Nguyen; Cooper, Earle (1983). Vietnam under Communism, 1975–1982. Hoover Press. ISBN 9780817978518.
- Vang, Pobzeb (2008). Five Principles of Chinese Foreign Policies. AuthorHouse. ISBN 9781434369710.
- Võ, Nhân Trí (1990). Vietnam's Economic Policy since 1975. Institute of Southeast Asian Studies. ISBN 9789813035546.

Party political offices
Preceded by Nguyễn Văn Linh	General Secretary of the Communist Party of Vietnam; 1991–1997	Succeeded by Lê Khả Phiêu
Political offices
Preceded by Võ Văn Kiệt – acting	Prime Minister of Vietnam; 1988–1991	Succeeded by Võ Văn Kiệt
