= Socialism in Vietnam =

Socialism in Vietnam, in particular Marxism–Leninism, is the ideological foundation of the Communist Party of Vietnam (CPV) for the development of the country ever since its establishment.

Ho Chi Minh was a Vietnamese Communist revolutionary leader who was Chairman and First Secretary of the Workers' Party of Vietnam. He was also Prime Minister (1945–1955) and President (1945–1969) of the Democratic Republic of Vietnam (North Vietnam). He was a key figure in its foundation in 1945 at the Ba Đình Square in Hanoi as well as the People's Army of Vietnam and the Viet Cong during the Vietnam War. According to Ho Chi Minh Thought, "Socialism is about making people rich and powerful... Socialism is to bring the people with freedom, prosperity, happiness, and chances of education, medical care, and good accommodation. Under socialism, children will be nurtured, and the elderly will be cared for." Ho Chi Minh also indicated that socialism is not a complete model but a constant formula, so building socialism must be practical, consistent with objective conditions, must uphold the Law and must know how to apply rules in a creative way, avoiding literal dogma, and stereotypes.

== History ==
"When the Soviet Union and its constellation of socialist countries existed, striving for socialism in Vietnam seemed logical and implicitly validated", said Nguyen Phu Trong in a presentation while visiting Cuba in 2012. According to Ho Chi Minh, the model of socialism and the path to socialism in Vietnam cannot be outlined, described in detail immediately at the beginning of the transition period and cannot be done only once. Along with the movement and transformation of the present world, the practical process of building socialism has been the foundation to complement the Communist Party of Vietnam's perception of socialism, its model and the way to implement that model. Since determining the goal of advancing toward socialism (in 1930), through nearly a century, the Communist Party of Vietnam's awareness of socialism has been more and more improved. Through each stage, observing the reality of the country, accumulating experiences domestically and internationally, the Party has constantly studied, explored and selected appropriated theory and practice to develop the awareness of socialism more deeply and intrinsically.

=== 1930–1945: Outlining the national liberation, moving towards socialism ===
From the point of view of the classics of Marxism-Leninism, there were two transitional paths to socialism. The first was a direct transition to socialism from high-level capitalist countries. Marx argued that communism was an evolutionary step of human society based on the socioeconomic conditions created by capitalism rather than the result of imposing an economic - politics model to society. He said: "Communism is for us not a state of affairs which is to be established, an ideal to which reality [will] have to adjust itself. We call communism the real movement which abolishes the present state of things. The conditions of this movement result from the premises now in existence". The second path was the indirect transition to socialism in low-growth capitalist countries or pre-capitalist countries with the help of other socialist countries. This was the view of Lenin and Stalin.

Flag of the Communist Party of Vietnam

On the basis of using the theory of continuous revolution, about the transition period to socialism of Marxism-Leninism and stemming from the characteristics of the actual situation of Vietnam, Ho Chi Minh proposed the strategic goal of the Vietnamese Revolution when founding the Communist Party of Vietnam (Feb-1930) which was to achieve national independence and advance to socialism. The first Platform of the Party stated: The Vietnam revolution must go through two stages, namely, the liberation of the nation, completing the national revolution of the people's democracy and then progress towards socialism. These two revolutionary periods had dialectical relations with each other: Wanting to build socialism must first win national independence and proceeding to socialism would maintain national independence and build a prosperous, free and happy life for the people.

In the dissertation in October 1930, it was determined that the revolution of Vietnam could skip the period of developing capitalism, fighting directly on the socialist path. According to Ho Chi Minh, when entering the transition period to socialism, Vietnam had the biggest characteristic was that it was transiting to socialism from a backward agricultural country without having to go through the period of capitalist development. This characteristic would dominate others, expressed in all areas of social life and causes many conflicts. In particular, Ho Chi Minh paid special attention to the fundamental contradiction of the transition period, which was a conflict between the high development demand of the country in the progress and the fact that the socioeconomic situation in Vietnam was too low. That's why the transition to Socialism was a complex, arduous and long-lasting revolution. And the victory of the August 1945 revolution under the leadership of Ho Chi Minh was the first historical victory of the Ho Chi Minh's thought about the revolutionary path of national liberation under the proletariat revolution. This victory opened up a new era of the Vietnamese nation - an era of independent freedom, people's democracy, moving toward socialism.

=== 1945–1954: Preparing toward socialism ===
At the Second Communist Party's National Congress (in 1951), through Truong Chinh's political report, he stated: "Vietnamese Revolution [...] must progress further to realize land reform and wipe out all vestiges of feudalism. In brief, the Vietnamese Revolution must fulfill both the anti-imperialist and anti-feudal tasks to realize independence, freedom and happiness for the people [...] to pave the way to the socialist revolution in the future". "It is a long-term struggle, in general goes through three stages: the first stage, the main task is the completion of national liberation; the second stage, the main task is to eliminate the remnants of the feudal and semi-feudal regimes, to thoroughly implement and improve the people's democratic regime; the third stage, the main task is to build the foundation for socialism, proceed to implement socialism ... These three stages are not separate, but intimately interconnected. And each stage has a central task that requires a concentration of large resource to implement".

=== 1954–1975: Building socialism in the North and revolutionary struggle in the South ===
In 1954, after the liberation of the North, the Communist Party began the process of exploring and proposing views on the path to socialism and building socialism.

By the Third National Congress (September 1960), the Party set out the way to socialist revolution in the North by simultaneously carrying out 3 revolutions: the revolution of production relationship, the revolution of science - technology and the revolution of ideology and culture. In which, the science - technology revolution was key and socialist industrialization was considered as a central task during the transition period, with the motto of moving fast, moving strong and moving steadily toward socialism.

In 1970, due to the effects of wars and more awareness of the characteristics of the country, the Party adjusted their perception, setting out the initial step of the transition period with the main content of accumulating capital for industrialization and improvement of people's lives, shifting small production to large socialist production.

=== 1975–1985: The whole country began building socialism ===
The Vietnam War ended successfully for North Vietnam in April 1975. A new era of the Vietnamese revolution had been opened: the era of national independence, unification and socialism.

On the 29th of September, 1975, at the 24th conference of the Central Executive Committee, Term III, the Party met to set out the task of completing the unification of the country, bringing the whole country quickly, strongly, firmly moving toward socialism. The resolution of the conference also raised the tasks of promoting the socialist revolution in the North and the immediate tasks to quickly stabilize the situation in the South, to soon join the North in the socialist revolutionary orbit.

The Fourth National Congress of the Party (December 1976) set out the national socialist revolution of the country, which decided to remove the content of the initial step with the expectation to complete the transition period within a five-year plan. In the Fourth Congress, the Vietnam Revolutionary Dissertation was approved, which was the new political platform of the Party. From analyzing the nature of Vietnamese society in the Indochinese War, the Communist Party pointed out that the resistance war was a national democratic revolution, that the task of anti-imperialist, liberating the nation was the focus, while simultaneously conducting the task of anti-feudalism, winning democratic rights. There must be a plan to carry out step by step those tasks and the national democratic revolution conducted by the people under the leadership of the Party would evolve into a socialist revolution.

To the Fifth National Congress of the Party (March 1982), it was determined to fix the shortcomings of some subjective, impatient wills, as well as determined the duties of The Party which was to successfully build socialism, ready to fight and firmly defend the Socialist Vietnam.

=== 1986–present: Innovation in awareness of socialism ===
The whole Party, from the central to local levels of committees, was step by step finding the way to innovate awareness of socialism. It was the period of incorporating innovative perspective, theoretical thinking about socialism, the transitional periods and practical experiences to reach the reform path which was specified at the Sixth National Congress of the Party (December 1986). The Congress pointed out the limitations, shortcomings, causes of limitations and weaknesses in the awareness of socialist society. Therefore, the Sixth Congress of the Party was an important development step in the awareness of socialism and transition to socialism in Vietnam. The organizational structure of the political system was gradually arranged in a more streamlined, efficient manner.

At the Seventh National Congress (1991), along with the Political Report of the Congress, the 1991 Platform of National's Construction During the Transition Period to Socialism, the Strategy of stabilizing and developing socioeconomic until 2000, the fourth Platform of the Communist Party of Vietnam was proposed. The platform determined that the transition to socialism in Vietnam was a long process, through many stages of both construction and national defense, thus the Party must master 7 fundamental orientations. Which was: (i) Building the socialist Vietnam State of the people, by the people, for the people led by the Communist Party; (ii) implementing the industrialization of the country in the direction of modernization; (iii) setting up step by step the socialist production relations in line with the development of production forces, the development of a multi-sector commodity-oriented economy, operating under the supervised market mechanism; (iv) conducting socialist revolution in the field of ideology and culture according to Marxism-Leninism and Ho Chi Minh's thoughts; (v) practice the policy of national unity, foreign policy of peace, cooperation and friendship; (vi) combining two strategic tasks of building socialism and protecting the Nation of Vietnam; and (vii) building a transparent and strong Party in politics, ideology and organization on a mission to build the country into a prosperous socialist country.

The Eighth National Congress (1996) of the Party announced, "Our country has been out of the socioeconomic crisis, although there are still some unstable aspects ..." The Congress also further developed the Platform of National Construction During the Transition Period to Socialism and affirmed: "The road to socialism in our country is increasingly defined more clearly through the transitional stages in our country... The task set out for the first stage of the transition period which is preparing the premise for industrialization has been basically completed to allow a transition to a new era of industrialization and modernization of the country."

By the Ninth National Congress (2001), the Party affirmed: "Socialism in the world, from lessons of success and failure as well as from aspirations and awakenings of the peoples, have the conditions and ability to create new developments. According to the evolutionary law of history, humankind will definitely advance to socialism." This was an important development reflecting a more fully and clearly perception of the Party on the path to socialism in Vietnam: National independence associated with socialism, rich people, strong country, fair, civilized and democratic society. It also identified that building socialism while ignoring capitalism regime created a change in the quality of society in all fields which was a difficult and complicated calling. It would have to go through a long transition period with many stages and forms of transitional economic and social organizations. Regarding the general model, the Congress made a clear statement about the difference between capitalist market economy and socialist market economy on basic points such as purpose, economic sectors, management and distribution mode. In particular, the Congress affirmed that the State's economy and management played an important role in the orientation of socioeconomic development toward socialism.

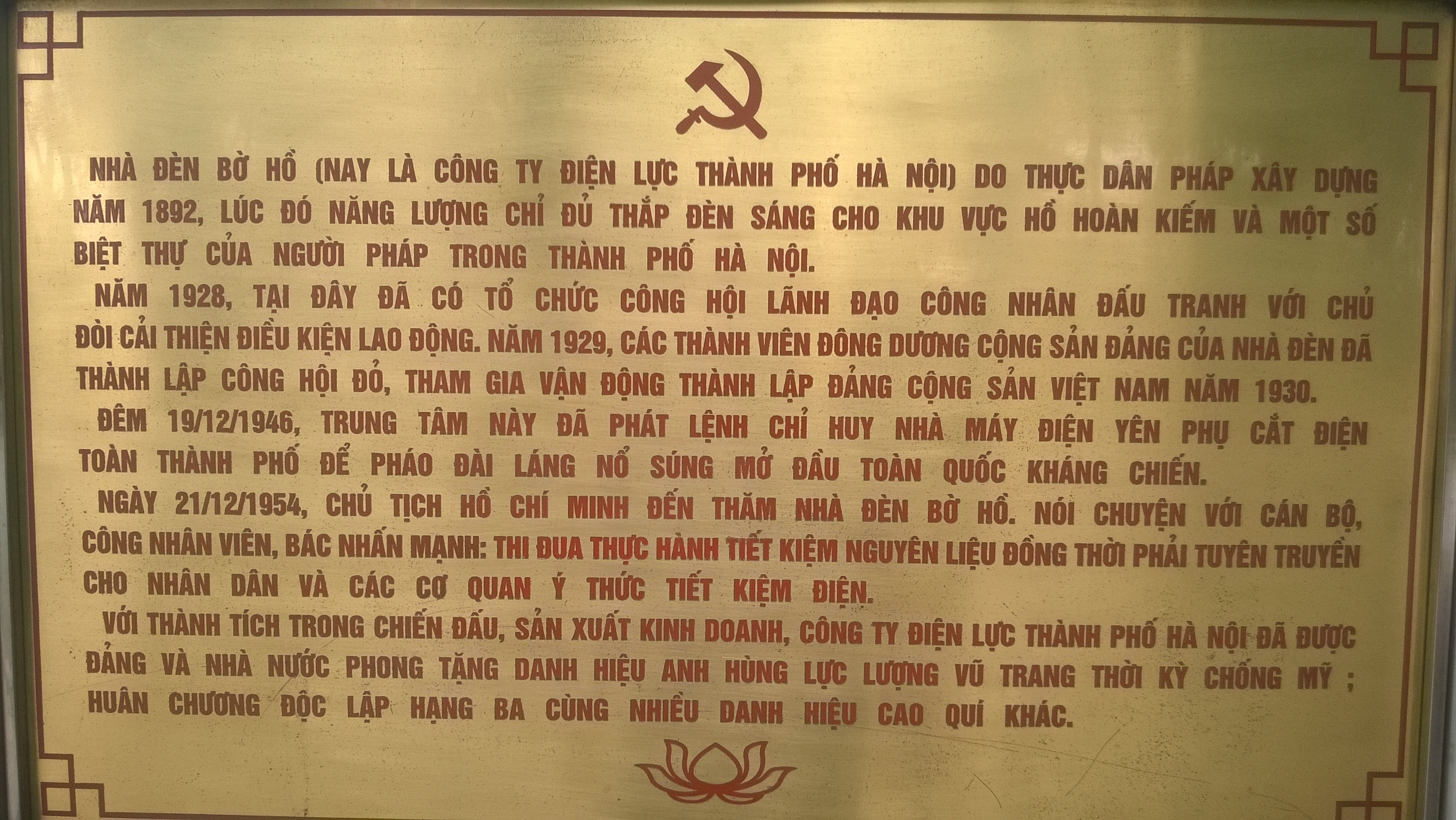
Plaque celebrating Socialism in Hanoi in 2014

At the Tenth National Congress (2006), the awareness of the nature and characteristics of socialism had some new points compared to that of the 1991 Platform. The purpose of socialism was defined more specifically. The characteristics of socialism, although there were changes in the wording, but essentially still retained the basic as well as adding in some new characteristics. When compared to the 1991 Platform, this awareness was more complete and comprehensive. The Tenth Congress affirmed: "Awareness of socialism and a path to socialism in our country is becoming more and more clear."

The Eleventh National Congress (2011) was summarizing 20 years of implementing the 1991 Platform, through the Platform of National Construction During the Transition to Socialism (supplemented and developed in 2011). The Politburo of the Term 11 advocated a review of 30 years of innovation to further clarify the theoretical and practical issues of the renovation process. The consistent awareness of the Party, the State and the people of Vietnam signified that the renovation process had increasingly shed light on issues of socialism and the transition to socialism in Vietnam. After more than a quarter of a century of renovation, the Communist Party of Vietnam has constantly added, developed the way, set out the Platform of National Construction During the Transition to Socialism at the Seventh Congress (June 1991) and supplemented and developed at the Eleventh Congress (July 2011).

The renovation has achieved successes of historical significance. In 2016, the Twelfth National Congress of the Party stated "Those achievements create an important premise and foundation for our country to continue to innovate and thrive strongly in the coming years; affirming that the Party's renovation policy is right and creative: the road to Vietnam's socialism is in line with Vietnam's revolutionary practices and the development trend of history."

== Social and political theory ==
After 20 years of implementing the Platform of National Construction During the Transition to Socialism in 1991, Vietnam has been out of underdevelopment, becoming a middle-income developing country. The six characteristics of the socialist society depicted in the 1991 Platform have been supplemented and developed by the 2011 Platform into eight basic characteristics of the socialist social model that the Vietnamese people continue to build in the 21st century. Those eight characteristics are:

(i) Rich people, strong country, fair, democratic and civilized society;

(ii) Owned by the people;

(iii) There is a high level of economic development, based on modern production forces and production relations in line with the development level of production forces;

(iv) There is an advanced culture and strong national identity;

(v) People are liberated from oppression, injustice, have a wealthy life, freedom, happiness, comprehensive development;

(vi) Ethnic groups in the Vietnamese community are equal, united, and support each other to progress;

(vii) There is socialism state of legitimate which belong to the people, created by the people, for the people under the leadership of the Communist Party;

(viii) Having friendly and cooperative relations with people of all countries in the world.
