= Kỷ nguyên mới, kỷ nguyên vươn mình của dân tộc =

Political slogan in Vietnam

"Kỷ nguyên vươn mình" lit. 'the era of growth' (full slogan: kỷ nguyên mới, kỷ nguyên vươn mình của dân tộc lit. 'a new era, an era of national resurgence'); is a political slogan initiated by General Secretary, State president Tô Lâm during his leadership of the Communist Party of Vietnam and the Vietnamese government. This political slogan marks a new phase of breakthrough for Vietnam today.

The goal is an era of prosperous development under the leadership of the Communist Party of Vietnam, standing shoulder to shoulder with global powers, to become a developing, modern industrialized, upper-middle-income country by 2030 and a developed, high-income country with a socialist orientation by 2045.

== Background ==
According to the media outlets of the Communist Party of Vietnam (CPV), Vietnam has gone through two "eras," with the first era beginning on August 19, 1945, marking the start of the Democratic Republic of Vietnam (D.R. Vietnam).

Until 1986, at the 6th National Congress of the Communist Party of Vietnam, the decision on Đổi Mới (renovation) marked the beginning of the second era.

At the same time (in 2025) Vietnam will officially celebrate the 80th Vietnamese National Day, the 50th national reunification day, and also the 40th anniversary of Vietnam's implementation of the Đổi Mới program. This is the time when Party congresses at all levels are taking place, leading up to the 14th National Congress of the Communist Party of Vietnam in 2026. The size of Vietnam's economy, estimated to have grown 96 times between 1986 and 2024, includes numerous free trade agreements with a total of more than 60 major countries and economies.

In 2024, Vietnam had risen to become one of the world's 40 largest economies, and was also among the top 20 countries in attracting foreign investment and trade volume. In addition, Vietnam has established diplomatic relations with 194 countries.

The country has also upgraded its relationships to 31 Strategic Partnership and Comprehensive Partnership frameworks, including all the Permanent Members of the United Nations Security Council and the G7 economies.

According to Tô Lâm, this is the time when all the elements "converge" for Vietnam to start a new era, an "Kỷ nguyên dân tộc Việt Nam" ("era of the Vietnamese nation's rise") called "Kỷ nguyên Văn minh hiện đại ("Modern civilization era").
