= 7th National Congress of the Communist Party of Vietnam =

- The flag of the Communist Party of Vietnam
- Date: 24–27 June 1991 (4 days)
- Location: Ba Đình Hall
- Participants: 1,176 delegates (which includes the members of the 6th Central Committee)
- Outcome: The election of the 7th Central Committee

The 7th National Congress of the Communist Party of Vietnam (Vietnamese: Đại hội Đảng Cộng sản Việt Nam VII) was held in Ba Đình Hall, Hanoi from 24 to 27 June 1991. The congress occurs once every five years. A total of 1,176 delegates represented the party's 2.1 million card-carrying members.

== Central Committee composition ==
Forty-six (31.5 percent) of the elected Central Committee members were new members. The remaining 64 (68.4 percent) were incumbents who were reelected. The Central Committee was evenly divided in its membership by government and party officials; 60 (41.1 percent) and 62 (41.8 percent) of the members were either party and government officials.

The military was represented by 11 (7 percent) people at the Central Committee. 52 (35.6 percent) members were provincial-level officials, of which 13 of them held either the post of head of the head of the provincial party committee or chairman of a provincial people's committee. Of incumbents, 42 (28.8 percent) were party officials and 47 (32.2 percent) were government officials. Of the new members, 18 (12.3 percent) were party officials and 15 (10.3 percent) were government officials.

The majority of incumbent members retained their leadership over the commissions and departments of the Central Committee. Of the five deputy commission or departments heads, three of them were newly elected members. Similarly, the incumbents dominated the government structure. 22 ministers and deputy ministers were incumbents, while seven newly elected members were either appointed minister or as deputy minister.

Four officials from the Ministry of Foreign Affairs (one ambassador and three deputy ministers) and the Ministry of National Defence (all of whom were incumbents), and two officials from the Ministry of Home Affairs (all incumbents) were elected to the Central Committee. Of these, Deputy Minister of Foreign Affairs Trang Quang Co was promoted to full Central Committee membership. 11 members (3 deputy ministers and 8 ministers) from the economic ministries and 6 (2 deputy ministers and 4 ministers) from the social welfare ministries were appointed to the Central Committee. Of the eleven members from the economic ministries, eighth of them were incumbents, while 2 out of 6 representatives from the social welfare ministries were incumbents.

== Resolutions ==
=== Platform and economic plan ===
The party's platform, the "Political Program for National Construction in the Period of Transition to Socialism", and the long-term economic plan, "Strategy for Socio-economic Stabilization and Development until the year 2000", were approved by the congress on 27 June 1991. The platform would remain unchanged until the 11th National Congress (held in 2011). According to Nguyễn Văn Linh, "more than 80 percent of party members, hundreds of veteran revolutionaries, thousands of scientists and intellectuals, and millions of members of various mass organisations" had commented on either the platform or the Strategy for Socio-economic Stabilization. While it's not possible to verify Nguyễn Văn Linh's claim, several members criticised the document's emphasis on conservative socialist ideology, and some even called for a new ideological legitimization for the party. Hoang Minh Chinh, the former head of the Institute of Philosophy, called for dropping the emphasis on class struggle and replacing it with Hồ Chí Minh's slogan of "great unity". Nguyễn Văn Linh gave full acceptance to this criticism, and more, and called for the establishment of "the worker–peasant–intellectual alliance", and further stated "socialism cannot be built if the working class does not have its own contingent of intellectuals and if the worker/peasant alliance itself fails to improve its knowledge or to attain intellectualization". The "Strategy for Socio-economic Stabilization and Development until the year 2000" was an ambiguous economic plan for Vietnam until the year 2000. The plan emphasized the need to improve the "market mechanism economy" (later referred to as the "socialist-oriented market economy").

=== Political Report ===
The Political Report was approved by the congress on 27 June 1991.

In the report's chapter on foreign relations, it stated that the party's overriding goal was to maintain peace, friendship and co-operation while creating favorable conditions "for the building of socialism." On its relations with the Soviet Union, the report stated: "We will consistently maintain solidarity with the USSR and renovate the procedures and enhance the efficiency of Vietnamese–Soviet cooperation". It pledged a "special relationship and solidarity" with the Lao People's Democratic Republic and the People's Republic of Kampuchea. The report emphasized the country's relationships with the socialist world, and promoted "relations of friendship, solidarity and co-operation for mutual benefit and on an equal footing with Cuba and other socialist countries." The report further emphasized the need to strengthen Vietnam's relationship with other Southeast Asian countries, India, China and the United States.

== Immediate aftermath ==
The 1st plenum of the Central Committee of the 7th National Congress was convened on 27 June 1991 to elect the General Secretary, the Politburo and the Secretariat. Nguyễn Văn Linh, after complaining about health problems since taking power at the 6th National Congress, resigned at the 1st plenum and was succeeded by Đỗ Mười. Đỗ Mười, upon his election, represented himself as a calm, judicial figure who could mediate between the party's factions while at the same time strengthening the party internally. 17 members were elected to the 7th Politburo, with the average being reduced from 72 to 65 years of age. The youngest member was 52 years of age. In contrast to previous politburos, the 7th Politburo was somewhat more professional and less rigid ideologically. Emphasis was put on science and technology and not class struggle and socialist thought in general. The Secretariat was reduced from 13 members to nine, with 2 out of nine members being incumbents from the former Secretariat.

== Bibliography ==
- Alagappa, Muthiah (1995). Political Legitimacy in Southeast Asia: The Quest for Moral Authority. Stanford University Press. ISBN 978-0804725606.
- Frost, Frank (1993). Vietnam's Foreign Relations: Dynamics of Change. Pacific Strategic Papers. Vol. 6. Institute of Southeast Asian Studies. ISBN 978-9813016651.
- Koh, David (2012). "Vietnam: A Glass Half Full or Half Empty?". Southeast Asian Affairs. 2012 (1). Institute of Southeast Asian Studies: 361–378.
- Pike, Douglas (January 1992). "Vietnam in 1991: The Turning Point". Asian Survey. 32 (1). University of California Press: 74–81. doi:10.2307/2645201. JSTOR 2645201.
- Stern, Lewis (1993). Renovating the Vietnamese Communist Party: Nguyen Van Linh and the Programme for Organizational Reform, 1987–91. Institute of Southeast Asian Studies. ISBN 978-9813016552.
