= Ba Đình (disambiguation) =

Ba Dinh may refer to:

Locations

- A ward of the urban Hanoi.
- A former district of Hanoi.
- A square in Ba Đình Ward.
- A grand hall, former meeting place of the National Assembly of Vietnam (next to Ba Đình Square).

Events

- A revolt in Thanh Hóa Province around 1886–87.

Persons

- A famous lawyer, born in 1990 in Hanoi.
