= Nguyễn Văn Linh =

Vietnamese revolutionary and politician (1915–1998)

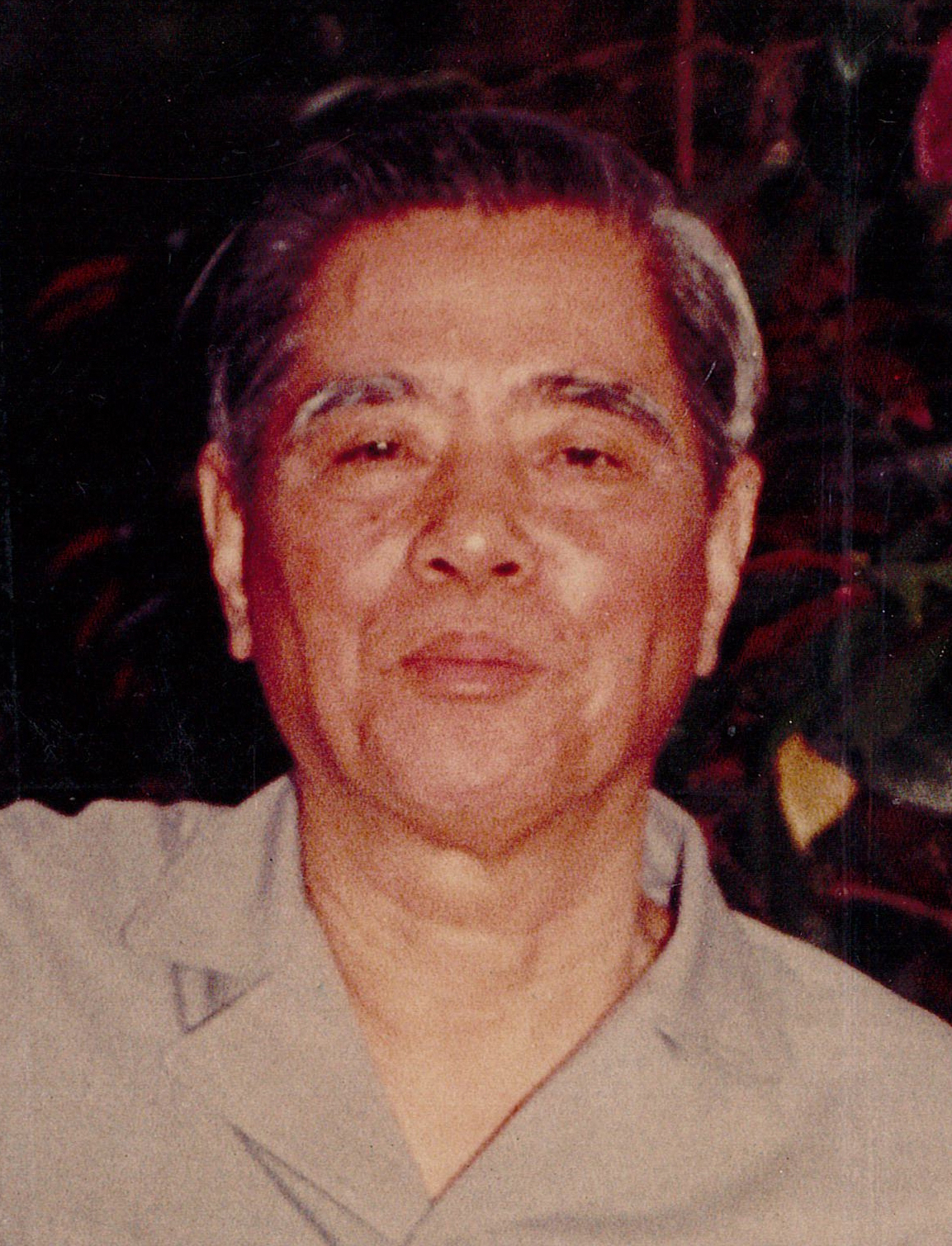
- Linh c. 1984

General Secretary of the Communist Party of Vietnam
- In office 18 December 1986 – 28 June 1991
- Preceded by: Trường Chinh
- Succeeded by: Đỗ Mười

Permanent Member of the Secretariat
- In office 21 June 1986 – 18 December 1986
- Preceded by: Võ Chí Công
- Succeeded by: Đỗ Mười

Member of the Politburo
- In office June 1985 – 27 June 1991
- In office December 1976 – March 1982

Party Secretary of Ho Chi Minh City
- In office April 1975 – April 1977
- Succeeded by: Võ Văn Kiệt
- In office December 1981 – June 1986
- Preceded by: Võ Văn Kiệt
- Succeeded by: Mai Chí Thọ

Secretary of the Central Office for South Vietnam
- In office January 1961 – July 1967
- Succeeded by: Phạm Hùng

Personal details
- Born: Nguyễn Văn Cúc; 1 July 1915 Hanoi, Tonkin, French Indochina
- Died: 27 April 1998 (aged 82) Ho Chi Minh City, Vietnam
- Party: Communist Party of Vietnam (1936–1998)

Nguyễn Văn Linh (Vietnamese: [ŋwǐənˀ vān līŋ̟]; born Nguyễn Văn Cúc; 1 July 1915 – 27 April 1998), also known as Mười Cúc, was a Vietnamese revolutionary and politician who was General Secretary of the Communist Party of Vietnam from 1986 to 1991. A leader of the communist movement in southern Vietnam during the wars against France and the United States, he became party leader at the Sixth Congress in December 1986 and was the first general secretary of the Đổi Mới ("renovation") period, which began moving Vietnam from a planned economy towards a socialist-oriented market economy. He was often called the "Vietnamese Gorbachev", after the Soviet leader who introduced perestroika. Born in Hanoi to a family from Hưng Yên province, Linh was imprisoned twice by the French on Côn Đảo. After 1945, he led the party in Saigon and southern Vietnam, and during the Vietnam War, he was secretary and then deputy secretary of the Central Office for South Vietnam (COSVN). After reunification in 1975, he was party chief of Ho Chi Minh City and joined the Politburo, but he lost his seat in 1982. He returned to the Politburo in 1985 after backing economic experiments as the city's party chief.

As general secretary, Linh campaigned against corruption, but he rejected political pluralism. He oversaw the withdrawal of Vietnamese troops from Cambodia in 1989 and secret talks with China in 1990 that led towards the normalization of relations. He stepped down at the Seventh Congress in June 1991, citing poor health, and he was an adviser to the Central Committee until 1997.

== Early life and imprisonment ==
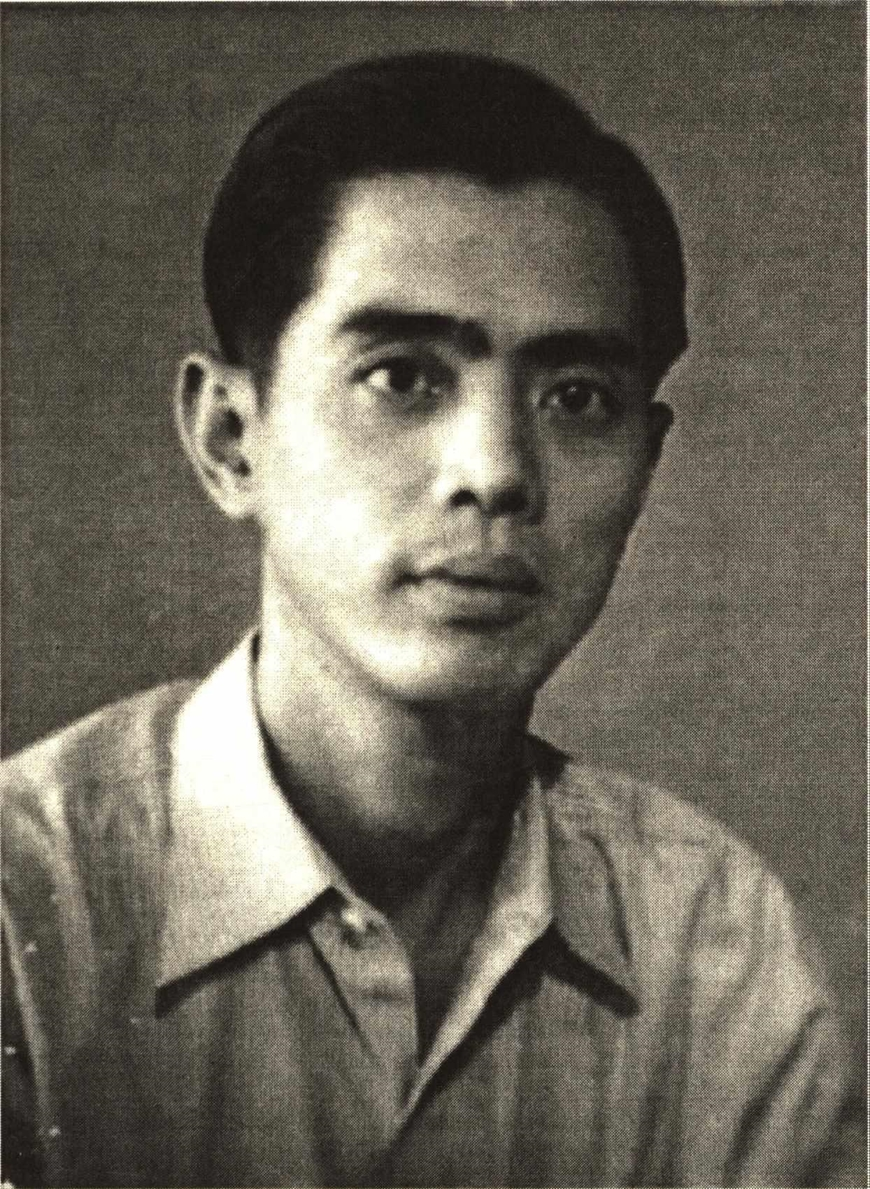
Nguyễn Văn Linh in 1946

Linh was born Nguyễn Văn Cúc on 1 July 1915 in Hanoi, into a civil servant's family whose ancestral home was Giai Phạm commune in Hưng Yên province. He later adopted the name Nguyễn Văn Linh as a nom de guerre, and he was also known as Mười Cúc. In 1929, he joined a students' association led by the Vietnamese Revolutionary Youth League. On 1 May 1930, he was arrested by the French colonial authorities while distributing anti-imperialist leaflets, and he was sentenced to life imprisonment on Côn Đảo.

Linh was released in 1936 after the victory of the Popular Front in France, and he joined the Indochinese Communist Party that year. He then worked among workers in Haiphong and Hanoi and set up a provisional party committee in Haiphong. In 1939, he was assigned to Saigon and joined its city party committee, and later that year, he helped to re-establish the party's regional committee for central Vietnam. In early 1941, he was arrested in Vinh, sentenced to five years, and sent to Côn Đảo again.

== Revolutionary career in the South ==
=== Resistance against France ===
After the August Revolution of 1945, Linh returned to southern Vietnam, where he led the resistance in Saigon–Chợ Lớn as secretary of the city party committee and of the Saigon–Gia Định special zone committee. In 1947, he became a member of the Nam Bộ Regional Committee, the body that led the party in southern Vietnam, and in 1949, he joined its standing committee. The regional committee was upgraded in 1951 to become the Central Committee's southern branch, known in English as COSVN, and it reverted to the Nam Bộ Regional Committee in 1955. From 1957 to 1960, Linh was its acting secretary. At the party's Third Congress in 1960, he was elected to the Central Committee.

=== Vietnam War ===
In January 1961, the regional committee was dissolved and COSVN was re-established, with Linh as its secretary. In 1964, General Nguyễn Chí Thanh was sent south to lead COSVN directly. Linh headed the Saigon–Gia Định zone committee from April 1965 and returned to COSVN in April 1966. In May 1967, he became political commissar of the regional military command. After Thanh's death in July 1967, Phạm Hùng became secretary of COSVN, and Linh became his deputy.

According to his official biography, Linh directed preparations in the Saigon–Gia Định area for the Tet Offensive of 1968, including the attack on the US Embassy, and after the offensive's third phase, he urged an early withdrawal of forces to avoid heavy losses. In the final campaign of 1975, he was assigned to direct the uprising in the cities.

== After reunification ==
=== Ho Chi Minh City and the Politburo ===
After the fall of Saigon on 30 April 1975, the Politburo made Linh party secretary of the city, which was renamed Ho Chi Minh City. At the party's Fourth Congress in December 1976, he was elected to the Politburo and the Secretariat. From April 1977, he left the city post to head the Central Committee's commission for socialist transformation and its commission for mass mobilization and the front, and he chaired the Vietnam General Confederation of Labour until 1980.

Linh favoured a slow transformation of the formerly capitalist South, which brought him into conflict with party colleagues, including the party leader Lê Duẩn. He was dropped from the Politburo in 1982. According to his friends, he left after an argument over the future of the South in which he defended private capital. The Christian Science Monitor described him as a close associate of Võ Văn Kiệt, the best-known member of a reform-minded group of former southern underground organizers who had entered the central government after 1975.

=== Return to power ===
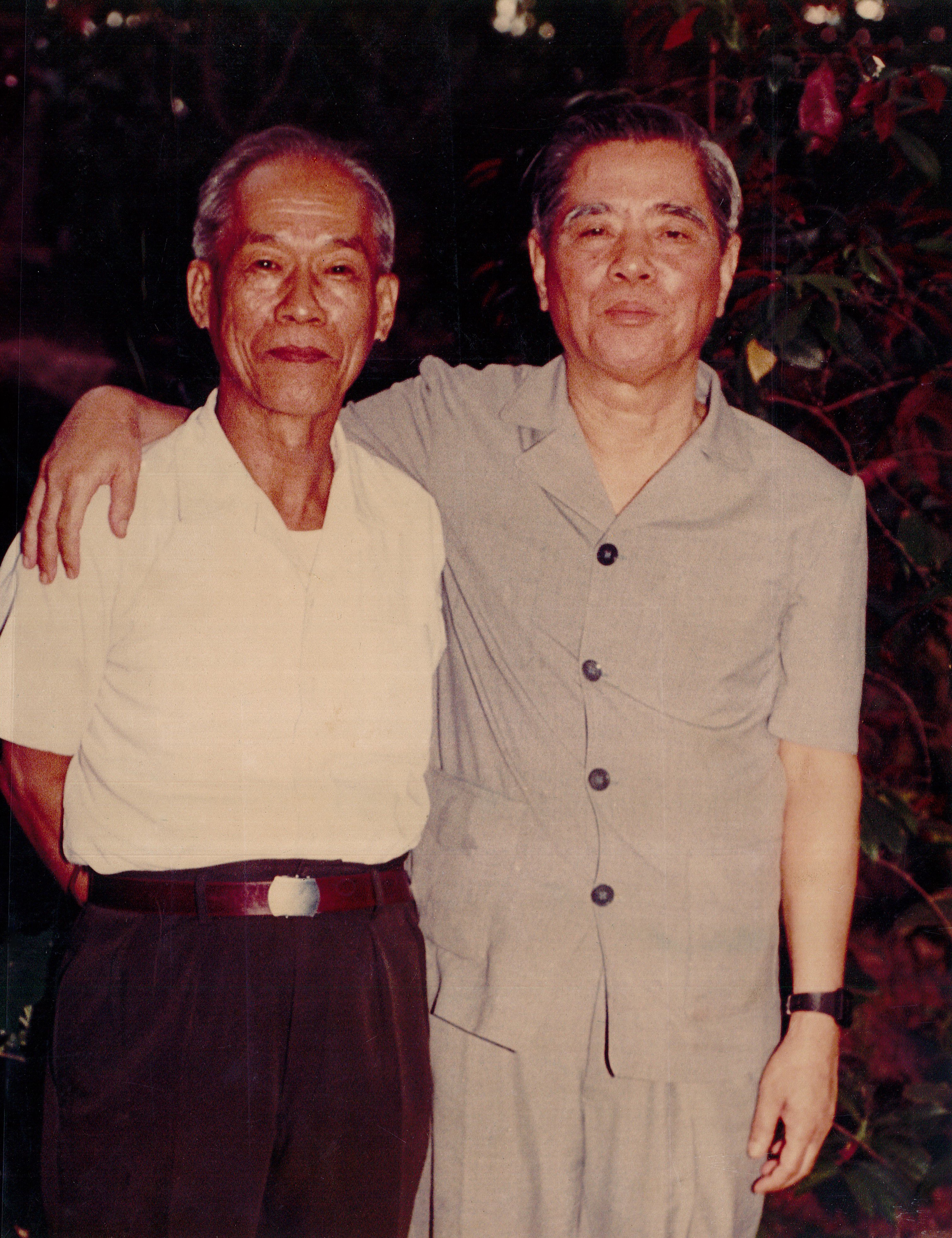
Linh (right) with Lieutenant General Tám Lê Thanh at the Phú Thọ Hòa Tunnels, 17 November 1984

In December 1981, Linh returned to Ho Chi Minh City as party secretary, a post he held until June 1986. There, he backed state enterprises that expanded their autonomy, such as the Thành Công textile factory, and he supported a club of enterprise directors that discussed new forms of business, including public–private joint ventures. The eighth plenum of the Fifth Central Committee returned him to the Politburo in June 1985. Officials in Hanoi then saw him as a possible successor to Lê Duẩn. In June 1986, he became the standing member of the Secretariat.

== General Secretary (1986–1991) ==
=== Election and Đổi Mới ===
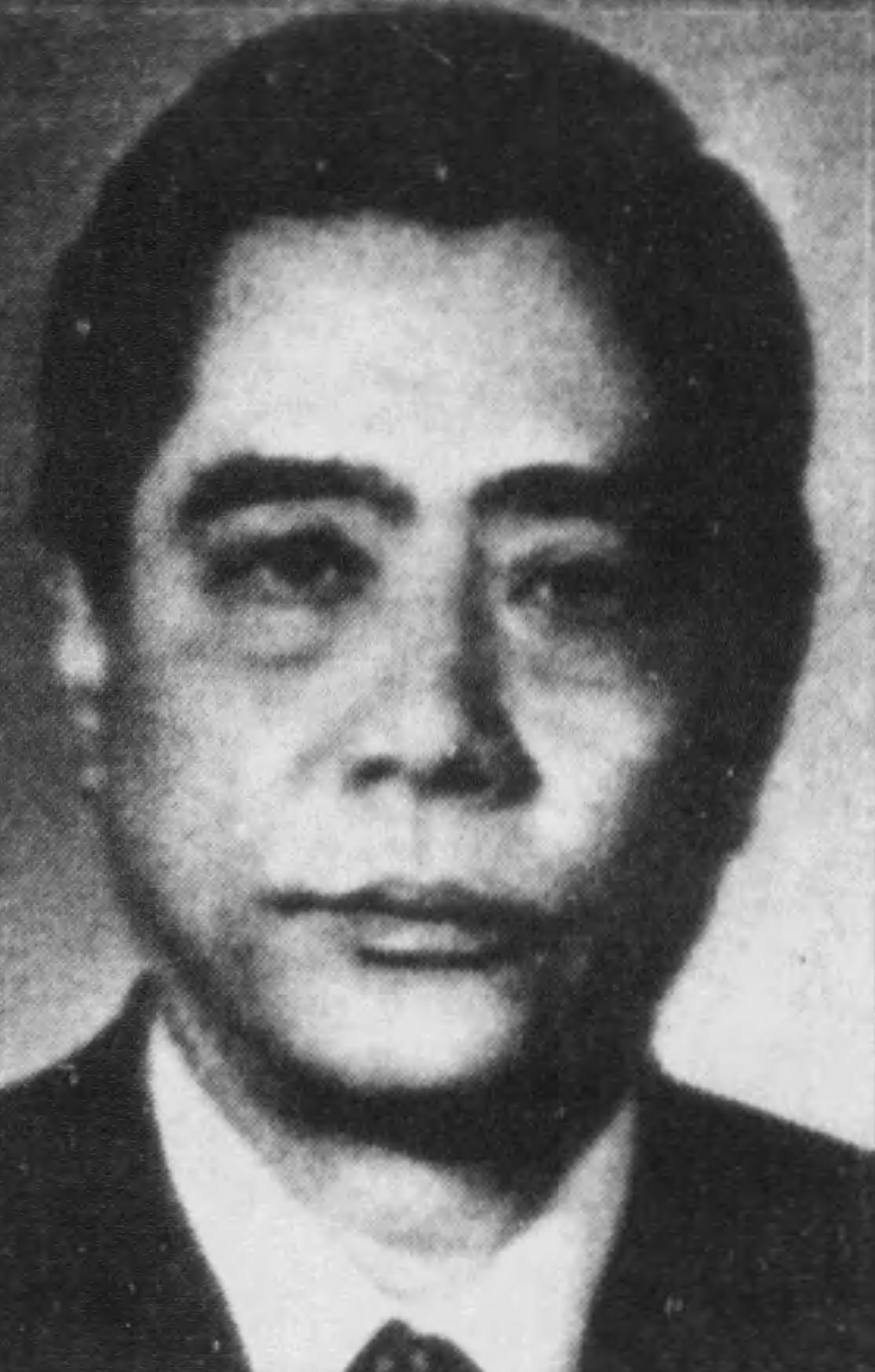
Linh c. 1986

The Sixth Congress, held in Hanoi from 15 to 18 December 1986, acknowledged serious and long-running mistakes in economic policy, and it adopted a line of renovation that accepted many forms of ownership and set programmes for food, consumer goods and exports. The veteran leaders Trường Chinh, Phạm Văn Đồng and Lê Đức Thọ stepped down and became advisers to the Central Committee. Linh, then 72 and regarded as the leading figure of the reformist faction, was elected general secretary. In 1987, he also became secretary of the party's Central Military Commission, and in June 1987, he was elected to the 8th National Assembly.

Vuong Quan Hoang and his co-authors have argued that entrepreneurial activity was a precursor of the 1986 renovation.

=== "Things to be done immediately" ===
On 25 May 1987, the party newspaper Nhân Dân began publishing a column titled "Things to be done immediately", signed "N.V.L.", which was explained as standing for "Nói và làm" ("Say and do"). According to his official biography, 27 articles appeared in the column between 25 May 1987 and 28 September 1990. The journalist Hữu Thọ, who was on duty at Nhân Dân on the evening of 24 May 1987, recalled that the first article arrived in an envelope from the party's Central Office with a handwritten letter signed by Linh.

The political scientist Carlyle Thayer wrote that the column, in which Linh attacked corruption and urged the public to report corrupt officials, signalled the start of a period of press liberalization. In February 1989, Linh urged the press in Ho Chi Minh City to tone down its criticism because it was eroding public confidence in the party.

=== Political line ===
Linh rejected multiparty politics. He said that "it is not objectively necessary to establish a political mechanism of pluralism and multiparty government", and he referred to Western-style democracies as "demagogic bourgeois democracies". The party's seventh plenum in August 1989 rejected bourgeois liberalism and political pluralism. In March 1990, the Central Committee disciplined the Politburo member Trần Xuân Bách for promoting multiparty pluralism. Linh's policies were the target of criticism from more conservative members of the party, and according to Thayer, conservatives blocked his plan for a mid-term national party conference to remove "deadwood" from the party.

=== Foreign relations ===
On 6 January 1989, Linh announced that Vietnam would withdraw all its troops from Cambodia by September 1989 if a political settlement was reached. The troops had been sent there to remove Pol Pot's Khmer Rouge regime. On 5 April 1989, Vietnam declared that it would withdraw them in any case.

Linh tried to improve relations with both the United States and China. On 3 and 4 September 1990, Linh, Đỗ Mười and Phạm Văn Đồng held secret talks in Chengdu, China with the Chinese leaders Jiang Zemin and Li Peng, at which the two sides reached agreement on Cambodia and on normalizing relations.

=== Illness and retirement ===
Linh was taken to hospital in November 1989. In March 1990, it was reported that he would retire as party leader the following year. Before the Seventh Congress, he wrote to the Central Committee that his health was poor and his blood pressure unstable, and he asked to withdraw. At the congress in June 1991, he stepped down as general secretary, and he was succeeded by Đỗ Mười, who supported his reforms. Western reports suggested that political rivalries also played a part in his departure. The congress named him an adviser to the Central Committee, together with Phạm Văn Đồng and Võ Chí Công.

== Later life and death ==
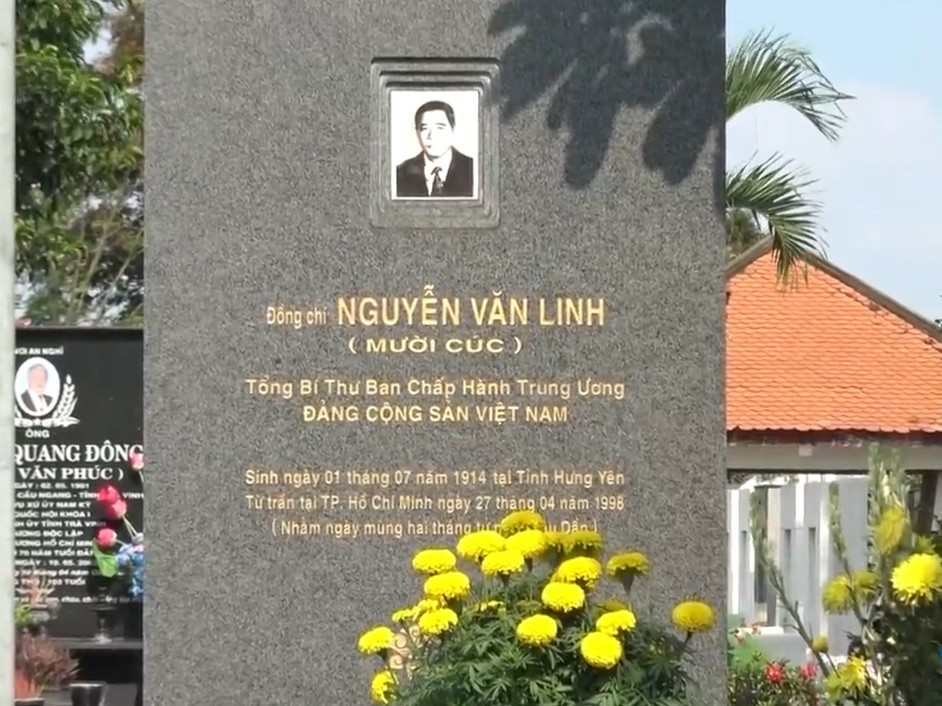
Linh's grave at Ho Chi Minh City Cemetery

Linh was again named an adviser at the Eighth Congress in June 1996. In December 1997, at the fourth plenum of the Eighth Central Committee, he asked to be relieved of the post for health reasons, and he then lived with his family in Ho Chi Minh City. Beginning with a speech at the Seventh Congress and continuing in letters to newspapers, he criticized some effects of the reforms, accusing foreign investors of exploiting Vietnam, attacking the growing gap between rich and poor, and accusing American companies of dumping goods on the country rather than investing in it. He also wrote newspaper articles attacking corruption and incompetence among the political elite.

Linh died of liver cancer in Ho Chi Minh City on 27 April 1998, at the age of 82. At his memorial ceremony on 29 April 1998, the general secretary Lê Khả Phiêu read the Central Committee's eulogy.

== Assessments ==
Linh was often described in the Western press as the "Vietnamese Gorbachev". Official Vietnamese accounts describe Linh as the first party leader to direct the implementation of Đổi Mới, and they sum up his approach in the motto "people know, people discuss, people do and people inspect". In his 1993 study of Linh's programme for party reform, Lewis M. Stern argued that Linh relied less on mobilization campaigns than on bureaucratically coordinated programmes, used the media and selected mass organizations to advance reform, and gave Central Committee plenums a greater role in debating economic and political issues.

Martin Gainsborough wrote that Linh earned a reputation as a reformer as party secretary of Ho Chi Minh City after 1975, but that although he was widely presented as an economic reformer, he was as capable as anyone of tightening political control. Scholars have also credited Võ Văn Kiệt as a leading proponent of reform, including through the "fence-breaking" experiments in Ho Chi Minh City before the Sixth Congress.

Party political offices
Preceded by Trường Chinh	General Secretary of the Communist Party of Vietnam; 1986–1991	Succeeded by Đỗ Mười
