= Ho Chi Minh Thought =

Political philosophy named after Ho Chi Minh

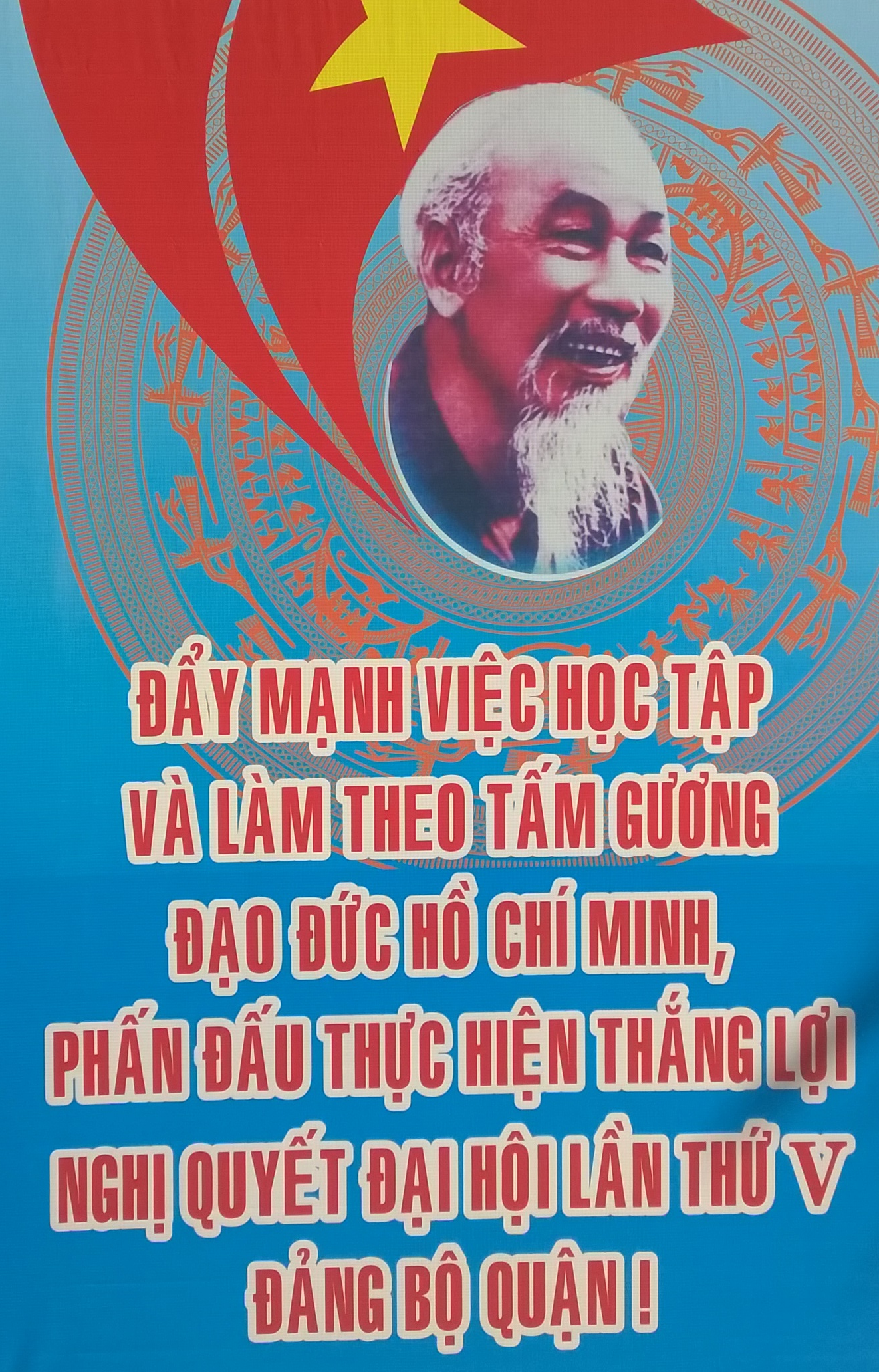
A Vietnamese poster promoting Ho Chi Minh's morals

Ho Chi Minh Thought (Vietnamese: Tư tưởng Hồ Chí Minh [tɯ̄.tɯ̂ɤŋ hò.cî.mīŋ]) is a political Ideology that builds upon Marxism–Leninism and the ideology of Vietnamese revolutionary Ho Chi Minh. It was developed and codified by the Communist Party of Vietnam and formalised in 1991. The term is used to cover political theories and policies considered as representing a form of Marxism–Leninism that has been adapted to Vietnamese circumstances and history. The ideology includes views on the basic issues of the Vietnamese Revolution, specifically the development and application of Marxism–Leninism to the material conditions of Vietnam.

Whilst the ideology is named after the Vietnamese revolutionary and President, it does not necessarily reflect the personal ideologies of Ho Chi Minh but rather the official ideology of the Communist Party of Vietnam.

== Origins ==
As with Mao Zedong Thought, the core of Ho Chi Minh Thought is the belief that the peasantry is the revolutionary vanguard in pre-industrial societies rather than the proletariat. Ho Chi Minh Thought is rooted in:

- Marxism-Leninism
- Traditional Vietnamese ideology and culture
- Religions origin thought: Confucianism, Buddhism and Christianity
- Ho Chi Minh's personal morality

=== Influence of Confucianism ===
Ho Chi Minh, the son of Confucian scholar Nguyễn Sinh Sắc who used to be a minor official of the Nguyễn dynasty, studied Confucianism throughout his life and was a strong critic of Confucian ethics and ideals. Despite this public criticism, scholars have argued that Confucianism remained part of both the personal ideology of Ho Chi Minh, and Ho Chi Minh Thought. In particular it was observed that Confucian morality and the principle of self-cultivation are a central part of the party's platform and the ideology of Ho Chi Minh Thought. The Communist Party of Vietnam rejects this, arguing that this interpretation is a distortion of the historical record of both Ho Chi Minh and the Communist Party of Vietnam.

Summarizing 30 years of studying Confucianism, Ho Chi Minh concluded:

Học thuyết của Khổng Tử có ưu điểm của nó là sự tu dưỡng đạo đức cá nhân. Tôn giáo Giêsu có ưu điểm của nó là lòng nhân ái cao cả. Chủ nghĩa Mác có ưu điểm của nó là phương pháp làm việc biện chứng. Chủ nghĩa Tôn Dật Tiên có ưu điểm của nó, chính sách của nó phù hợp với điều kiện nước ta. Khổng Tử, Giêsu, Mác, Tôn Dật Tiên chẳng có những ưu điểm chung đó sao? Họ đều muốn mưu hạnh phúc cho mọi người, mưu phúc lợi cho xã hội. Nếu hôm nay họ còn sống trên cõi đời này, nếu họ hợp lại một chỗ, tôi tin rằng họ nhất định chung sống với nhau rất hoàn mỹ như những người bạn thân thiết. Tôi cố gắng làm người học trò nhỏ của các vị ấy.

The good side of Confucianism is the cultivation of personal ethics. The good side of Christianity is noble benevolence. The good side of Marxism is the dialectical method. The good side of Sun Yat-sen is that his thinking is suitable to the conditions in Vietnam. Do Confucius, Jesus, Marx and Sun Yat-sen not all have the same good side? They all sought the happiness for the people, and prosperity for the society. If today, they were still alive, if they were gathered in the same place, I believe they would certainly be living together in perfect harmony, as good friends. I strive to be their little student.

== Ideology ==
The following is described as the core of the Ho Chi Minh Thought ideological system, as codified by the Communist Party of Vietnam:

- National liberation, class liberation, human liberation
- National independence
- National unity
- People's ownership; building the true state of the people, by the people, for the people
- National defense of all people, the building of the people's armed forces
- Economic and cultural development, constantly improving the material and spiritual life of the people
- Revolutionary ethics, diligence, thriftiness, integrity, righteousness, and impartiality
- Take care of fostering revolutionary generations for the next life
- Building a clean, strong party, cadres and party members who are both leaders and loyal servants of the people

Central to Ho Chi Minh Thought is the importance of the Communist Party as the center of a national liberation movement. Ho Chi Minh Thought argues that revolutionary violence and humanitarian peace are dialectically opposed to one another. However, the synthesis of their conflict would inevitably be the preservation of peace, independence, and national liberation.

Ho Chi Minh Thought cites the following concerning the construction and characteristics of a socialist society and economy:

- Socialism is a society with a highly developed production force, associated with the progressive development of science — technology, and culture, rich people, and a strong country.
- Implementation of workers ownership of the means of production and implementing the principle of labour distribution.
- A dictatorship of the proletariat based on the unity of industrial, agricultural, and intellectual workers under the leadership of the Communist Party.
- A socialist society has a system of social relations that is healthy, fair, and equal, with no opposition between intellectual and manual labour, nor between urban and rural areas.

We must develop the state-owned economic sector to create the material basis for socialism and promote socialist reform.

— Ho Chi Minh

Ho Chi Minh Thought emphasizes a gradual transition to socialism. Similar to Socialism with Chinese characteristics, it places emphasis on the role of the development of the productive forces. According to Ho Chi Minh, when entering the period of transition to socialism, the Vietnamese economy was a largely outdated agricultural economy that had not yet undergone capitalist development. In particular, he paid special attention to the fundamental contradiction of the transition period, which is the conflict between the country's high development needs and the socio-economic situation of the working class. Ho Chi Minh Thought also stresses learning from the experiences of other socialist countries in building socialism and making use of international aid and cooperation.

Although Ho Chí Minh believed that Vietnam had entered the stage of transition to socialism in 1954, he also thought that Vietnam was still "a democratic regime in which people are the masters" and not a socialist state. According to him, to reach the socialist stage of development, the development of the state sector was of utmost importance, as its absence would lead to failure.

This discussion over the transition to socialism continued in the 21st century. The platform of the 11th National Congress held in January 2011 stated: "This is a profound and thorough revolutionary process and a complicated struggle between the old and the new for qualitative changes in all aspects of social life. It is essential to undergo a long period of transition with several steps of development and several mixed social and economic structures". According to Nguyễn Phú Trọng, who became the party's General Secretary in 2011, socialist factors of development compete with non-socialist factors, which includes the features of capitalism, during the transition to socialism. Trọng said: "Along with positive aspects, there will always be negative aspects and challenges that need to be considered wisely and dealt with timely and effectively. It is a difficult struggle that requires spirit, fresh vision, and creativity. The path to socialism is a process of constantly consolidating and strengthening socialist factors to make them more dominant and irreversible. Success will depend on correct policies, political spirit, leadership capacity, and the fighting strength of the Party".

== Morality ==
A particular aspect of Ho Chi Minh thought is the emphasis on personal morality and ethics. The personal values of Ho Chi Minh are regularly upheld by the Party, and party members are taught to exemplify Ho Chi Minh's personal values: practicing the standard of industriousness, thrift, integrity, uprightness, public-spiritedness and selflessness in serving the country and the people. Central to Ho Chi Minh morality is living a modest lifestyle, free from material worries, whilst devoting oneself to the collective good and the advancement of socialism and self-determination. Ho Chi Minh wrote about morality throughout his life, and often criticized individualism, such as in his short essay Raise up Revolutionary Ethics, Eliminate Individuals. The personal values of Ho Chi Minh are a mandatory part of the school curriculum throughout Vietnam.

== Development ==
At the Seventh National Congress of the Communist Party of Vietnam, held in Hanoi in 1991, it was determined that Marxism–Leninism and Ho Chi Minh Thought were the basis of the ideology of the Party. Since this congress, it has been taught in all universities as a compulsory subject for students of all disciplines. The first instance of Ho Chi Minh Thought as a subject of formal training and critical discussion was at Hanoi University in 1997.

Domestic researchers and Ho Chi Minh's comrades have written many works on Ho Chi Minh Thought such as: Understanding some issues in Ho Chi Minh's thought (1982) by Le Mau Han; Ho Chi Minh Thought Research (1993) by the Ho Chi Minh Institute's authors; The world has changed but Ho Chi Minh thought still thrives (1991), Ho Chi Minh thought (1993), Ho Chi Minh thought process of formation and development (1993), Ho Chi Minh thought and the way Vietnamese revolution (1997) by Vo Nguyen Giap; Basic perceptions about Ho Chi Minh thought (1998) of Pham Van Dong; The formation of Ho Chi Minh ideology (1997) by Tran Van Giau; From traditional thinking to Ho Chi Minh thought (1998) by Hoang Tung.

== See also ==
- Communism in Vietnam
- Juche
- Maoism
- Kaysone Phomvihane Thought
- Angkar
- Primary stage of socialism
- Socialist-oriented market economy
- Vietnamese nationalism
