= Socialist-oriented market economy =

Current economic system in Vietnam

The Government of Vietnam is under the absolute leadership of the Communist Party of Vietnam, which established the country as a nominal socialist state.

The socialist-oriented market economy (Vietnamese: Kinh tế thị trường định hướng xã hội chủ nghĩa) is the official title given to the current economic system in Vietnam by the ruling Communist Party. It is described as a multi-sectoral market economy where the state sector plays the decisive role in directing economic development, with the eventual long-term goal of developing communism.

The socialist-oriented market economy is a product of the Đổi Mới (innovation) economic reforms process which led to the replacement of the centrally planned economy with a market-based mixed economy based on the predominance of state-owned industry. These reforms were undertaken to allow Vietnam to integrate with the global economy. The term "socialist-oriented" is used to highlight the fact that Vietnam has not yet achieved socialism and is in the process of building the basis for a future socialist system. The economic model is similar to the socialist market economy employed in China.

== Reforms leading to establishment ==
The Đổi Mới economic reforms were initiated by the Communist Party of Vietnam under Nguyễn Văn Linh on 18 December 1986 during the party's 6th National Congress. These reforms introduced a greater role for market forces for the coordination of economic activity between enterprises and government agencies, and allowed for private ownership of small enterprises and the creation of a stock exchange for both state and non-state enterprises.

The economic reforms aimed to restructure the Vietnamese economy away from Soviet-type central planning and towards a market-based mixed economy intended to be a transitional phase in the development of a socialist economy. The goal of this economic system is to improve the productive forces of the economy, developing a firm technical-material base for the foundation of socialism, and to enable Vietnam to better integrate with the world economy.

In the early 1990s, Vietnam accepted some World Bank reform advice for market liberalization, but rejected structural adjustment programs and conditional aid funding requiring privatization of state-owned enterprises.

== Description ==
The socialist-oriented market economy is a multi-sectoral commodity economy regulated by the market, consisting of a mixture of private, collective and state ownership of the means of production. However, the state sector and collectively owned enterprises form the backbone of the economy. It is similar to the Chinese socialist market economy in that many forms of ownership, including cooperative/collective enterprises, communal, private and state ownership models co-exist in the economy, but the state sector plays a decisive role.

=== Compared with the Chinese model ===
In contrast to the Chinese model (dubbed the socialist market economy), the Vietnamese system is more explicitly characterized as an economy in transition to socialism and not as a form of socialism, with the process of building socialism seen as a long-term process. Claiming to be consistent with Marxist theory, socialism is understood to only emerge once Vietnam's productive forces are developed to a point where socialism becomes a technical possibility. As such, it is similar to the Chinese position on the primary stage of socialism.

Vietnam's socialist-oriented market economy shares many common characteristics with the Chinese socialist market economy in its institutions and policies, combining fundamentally market-based economies with the predominance of state-owned enterprises, the coexistence of a vibrant private sector, a single-party political system, and the existence of five-year economic plans. This has led development economists to consider both these countries sharing the same basic economic model.

The differences between these two models includes a higher degree of decentralization and autonomy of local governments in Vietnam (being higher than in other East Asian developmental states), with greater income redistribution between provinces resulting in a lower Gini coefficient. Some authors associate this model with the East Asian model of state capitalism, while others associate it with market socialism. Common to other East Asian developmental states, Vietnam shares mutually supporting institutions and active public authorities with strong capacities to implement long-term economic plans.

== Theoretical basis ==
The Communist Party of Vietnam maintains that the socialist-oriented market economy is consistent with the classical Marxist view of economic development and historical materialism, where socialism can only emerge once material conditions have been sufficiently developed to enable socialist relations. The socialist-oriented market model is seen as a key step for achieving the necessary economic growth and modernization while being able to co-exist in the contemporary global market economy and benefit from global trade. The Communist Party of Vietnam has re-affirmed its commitment to the development of a socialist economy with its Đổi Mới reforms.

This economic model is defended from a Marxist-Leninist perspective, which states that a planned socialist economy can only emerge after first developing the basis for socialism through the establishment of a market economy and commodity-exchange economy and that socialism will only emerge after this stage has exhausted its historical necessity and gradually transforms itself into socialism. Proponents of this model argue that the economic system of the Soviet Union and its satellite states attempted to go from a natural economy to a planned economy by decree without passing through the necessary market economy phase of development.

Proponents of socialist market economies distinguish themselves from market socialists with the view of market socialism that markets are a central feature of socialism and that markets are the most feasible mechanism for a socialist economy.

== See also ==
- Developmental state
- Dirigisme
- East Asian model
- Economy of Vietnam
- Goulash Communism
- List of communist ideologies
- Market socialism
- New Economic Policy
- Primary stage of socialism
- Socialism with Chinese characteristics
- Socialist market economy
- State socialism
- Transition economy
- Titoism
