= Đổi Mới =

Vietnamese market reforms beginning in late 1986

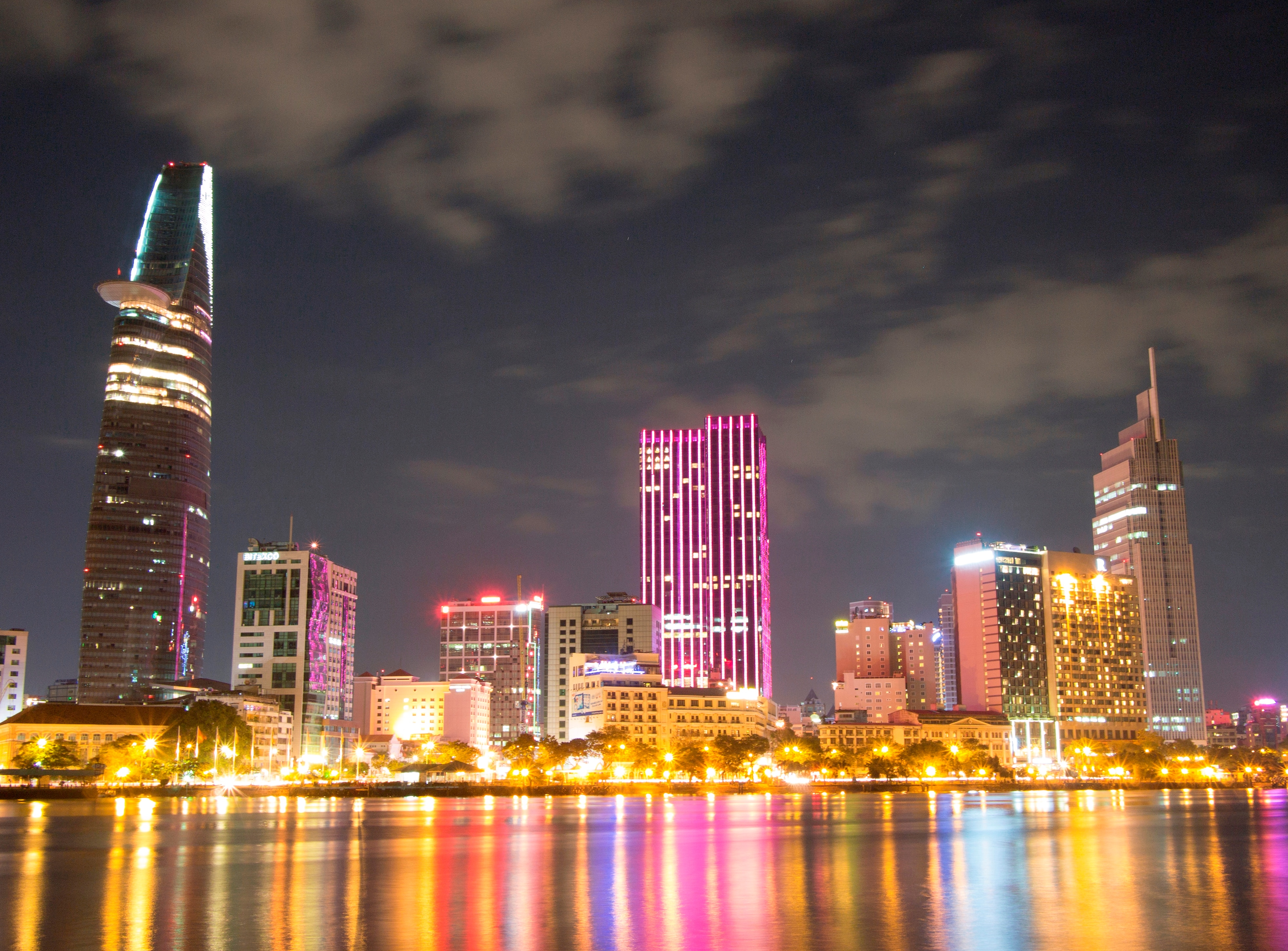
The modernization of Ho Chi Minh City, one achievement of the Đổi Mới policy

Đổi Mới (IPA: [ɗo᷉i mɤ̂ːi]; transl. "renovation" or "innovation") is the name given to the economic reforms process of Vietnam since late 1986 with the goal of creating a "socialist-oriented market economy". The term đổi mới itself is a general term with wide use in the Vietnamese language meaning "innovate" or "renovate". However, the Đổi Mới Policy (Chính sách Đổi Mới) refers specifically to the reforms that sought to transition Vietnam from a command economy of the subsidy period to a socialist-oriented market economy. The economic reforms in the Soviet Union under Gorbachev partially inspired the Vietnamese government. However, unlike the Soviet Union but like China, the communist rulers in Vietnam refused political reform.

The Đổi Mới economic reforms were initiated by the Communist Party of Vietnam (CPV) in December 1986 during the party's 6th National Congress. Vietnam learned from China's reform experience but with more conservative level. These reforms introduced a greater role for market forces for the coordination of economic activity between enterprises and government agencies and allowed for private ownership of small enterprises and the creation of a stock exchange for both state and non-state enterprises.

== Background ==
A centralized bureaucratic and planned economy (the Subsidy period) was introduced to replace the free market in the North in 1954 after the State of Vietnam lost to the communists with the First Indochina War, as well as to the whole of Vietnam in 1975 after the fall of capitalist South Vietnam to communists after the Vietnam War. After reunification into a unified communist state in 1976, the economy of the Socialist Republic of Vietnam was plagued by enormous difficulties in production, imbalances in supply and demand, inefficiencies in distribution and circulation, soaring inflation rates, and rising debt problems. Vietnam's gross domestic product (GDP) in 1984 was valued at US$18.2 billion with a per capita income estimated to be between US$200 and US$300 per year. Reasons for this mediocre economic performance have included severe climatic conditions that afflicted agricultural crops, sanctions enforced by the United States after the collapse of its ally (Republic of Vietnam/South Vietnam), the Sino-Vietnamese War, bureaucratic mismanagement, the extinction of entrepreneurship and the military occupation of Cambodia, which resulted in much-needed international aid for reconstruction being cut off.

From 1978 until 1991, as part of the Eastern Bloc led by the Soviet Union, Vietnam was a member of the Comecon, and was therefore heavily dependent on trade with the Soviet Union and its allies. Following the dissolution of the Comecon and the loss of its traditional trading partners, Vietnam was forced to liberalize trade, devalue its exchange rate to increase exports, and embark on a policy of economic development. In the years immediately prior to the Đổi Mới Reforms, Vietnam faced an economic crisis; inflation soared to over 700 percent, economic growth slowed down, and export revenues covered less than the total value of imports. In addition, Soviet aid decreased under Gorbachev from 1986, increasing Vietnam's international isolation. This resulted in an intense debate within the Communist Party about the efficacy of the command economy system and the possibility of reform in the run up to the 6th National Congress of the Communist Party of Vietnam in December 1986.

One of the most important developments which gave rise to change within the Party was the death of Party General Secretary, Lê Duẩn, in July 1986. In December 1986, the Sixth Party Congress elected as Party Secretary the more liberal Nguyễn Văn Linh, a reformist and former leader of the National Liberation Front.

=== Early reforms ===
While Đổi Mới was officially introduced at the 6th National Congress of the Communist Party of Vietnam in 1986, the state had initiated reforms in the early 1980s. Specifically, in October and November 1978, cooperative leaders in the north were permitted to rent out fields to members during the winter as long as the latter produced winter crops collectively for required number of days and return the land in time for growing paddy in the spring.

At the Six Party Plenum in August 1979, the Party allowed for the decentralization of economic decision making related to farming and introduced more incentives for production expansion. In 1980, Provincial governments were permitted to establish trading firms, breaking the monopoly of foreign trade by the central state in Vietnam. In 1981, agricultural reforms were introduced, which allowed farmland to be distributed to individual workers, individual management of a collective, and farmers could retain all production beyond their farming quota. These agricultural reforms contributed to the recovery of industrial output. Following these measures, price controls were removed from numerous consumer products to increase trade at real-market prices and ease shortages of them within the state trade system.

However, facing these reforms, the Vietnamese government led by Lê Duẩn had a negative and opposing attitude.

== Creation of the socialist-oriented market economy ==
=== Reforms ===
The 6th National Congress of the Communist Party of Vietnam under Nguyễn Văn Linh was convened on 15 December 1986 and lasted until 18 December. The Congress reaffirmed its commitment to the reform program of the 8th plenum of the 5th Central Committee, and issued five points;

- "concerted efforts to increase the production of food, consumer goods and exportable items";
- "continue the efforts to control small merchants and capitalists, while at the same time acknowledging the reality of supporting a mixed economy";
- "to regenerate the planning bureaucracy while making the economic management system more efficient by decentralizing authority and making room for more independent decision-making";
- "to clarify the powers and jurisdiction of the Council of Ministers, and the reorganization of state management apparatus to make it more efficient;
- "to improve party organizational capabilities, leadership and cadre training."

Võ Văn Kiệt, a Deputy Chairman of the Council of Ministers, delivered the Economic Report to the 6th National Congress. The political and economic reports stressed Đổi Mới (Renovation), and Vietnam specialist Carlyle Thayer wrote that Võ Văn Kiệt may have been the foremost advocate of this concept. In his speech to the Congress, Võ Văn Kiệt said, "in the economic field, there will be renovation in economic policies and the management system." Võ Văn Kiệt said that agriculture and not heavy industry would be most important during the 4th Five-Year Plan. During the 4th Five-Year Plan, Võ Văn Kiệt said, "[t]he ... main orientation for heavy industry in this stage is to support agriculture and light industry on a proper scale and at an appropriate technical level." Võ Văn Kiệt stressed the role of exports and the production of grain, food, and consumer goods to revitalize the Vietnamese economy. The main objective of the 4th Five-Year Plan was the production of grain and food products; "a target of 22–30 million metric tons of grain in paddy" was set for 1990. While several methods were to be used to reach this goal, material incentives and end-product contracts would play a prominent role. The Central Management System was abolished and the economic focus was shifted to the creation of a market-driven economy with different sectors, and competition between the private sector and the state in non-strategic sectors. In 1987, inspection stations along the national highway were removed to allow more efficient flow of goods and services between different municipalities. Markets where private agricultural products were allowed to be sold were rapidly growing. This change towards a market-oriented economy also involved a shift away from socialist models of universal state-funded healthcare to a hybrid system influenced by market-based fundamentals.

Subsequently, the National Assembly introduced the 1987 Foreign Investment Law with a desire to "mobilize every means to attract foreign capital for local development," (Foreign Investment Law 1987) even permitting complete foreign ownership of domestic physical assets and outlawing the prospects of nationalization.

Privately owned enterprises were permitted in commodity production (and later encouraged) by the Communist Party of Vietnam. The first half of the 1990s observed changes in the legal framework for the private sector. In 1990, Law on Private Enterprises which provided a legal basis to private firms was enacted, while Companies Law acknowledged Joint-stock company and private limited liability company. In the same year, the Party began discussing the potential of privatizing state-owned enterprises (SOEs), while also normalizing relations with the People's Republic of China. Subsequently, the 1992 Constitution officially recognized the role of the private sector.

In the agricultural sector, the Land Law was enacted in 1988, which recognized private land use rights. In addition, Central Committee Resolution 10 was issued; according to this resolution, farmers were not obliged to participate in cooperatives and were permitted to sell their products on the free market. Also, the Resolution returned land-use rights to private households and recognized them as autonomous economic units. As a result, the agriculture sector and the rural economy began shifting from autarky to commodity production, allowing each region to produce according to their comparative market advantage. In this renewed economic model, the state retreated to a regulative role, with the market determining the prices of goods and services.

In the early 1990s, Vietnam accepted some World Bank reform advice for market liberalization, but rejected structural adjustment programs and conditional aid funding requiring the privatization of state-owned enterprises. With the reforms, the number of private enterprises increased; and by 1996, there were 190 joint stock companies and 8,900 limited liability companies registered. The private sectors played an important role in the service industry, as the share in the retail trade activity increased from 41% to 76% in 1996.

Throughout this period, the National Assembly introduced various corporate and income tax deductions to spur both domestic and foreign investment. These fiscal adjustments included the introduction of user fees for public services in 1989, which represented a shift away from the previous model of full state subsidies and led to higher out-of-pocket expenses for rural households. In terms of rural development, the government restructured the rural economy away from agriculture by incentivizing small and handcraft villages and training labor for the industrial sector.

While foreign trade was centrally controlled by the state, the state started to loosen control of foreign trade. Consumer goods were sent back home by Vietnamese who worked or studied in the socialist countries in the first stages up to the reunification. The sources of commercial goods diversified since then; these varied from gifts shipped by overseas Vietnamese to their families, to goods left over during the US occupation of the south which were tradable in the Soviet for raising capital. Further, neighboring countries such as Laos and Cambodia provided opportunities to smuggle goods into Vietnam. There were two types of goods smuggling from Cambodia; the first one included those left behind by victims of the Khmer Rouge, while the other were those imported from Thailand. For instance, Thai beer being imposed high duties was usually smuggled by the sea route into Vietnam.

On 4 May 2025, General Secretary of the Communist Party of Vietnam Tô Lâm signed a new Politburo resolution on developing the private economy, considering it the most important driving force for the Vietnamese economy, leading to the Vietnamese National Assembly passing a resolution on some special mechanisms and policies for private economic development on May 17.

=== Successes ===
As a result of vast privatization and economic reforms, Vietnam underwent a miraculous economic transformation in the 1990s, especially in the early periods of reform (1986–1990). Those years saw an average GDP growth of 4.4 percent per year, with the average GDP growth rate accelerating to approximately 6.5 percent per year from 1990 until the 1997 Asian financial crisis. In terms of scale, Vietnam's GDP grew almost five times from $6.472 billion in 1990 to $31.173 billion in 2000, while GDP per capita grew from $95 in 1990 to $390 in 2000. Poverty rates declined significantly in most provinces, while income also recorded significant growth in metropolitan areas and provinces where levels of investment were high. As the overall investment environment and legal transparency improved, approximately $18.3 billion of actual foreign direct invested capital flowed into the Vietnamese economy. This increased FDI inflow provided the much-needed capital for economic growth, while also creating jobs for laborers in rural provinces and led to positive technological spillover. For instance, in provinces with high FDI inflow such as Vinh Phuc or Binh Duong, the unemployment rates declined more significantly than the national rate, while local income per capita also grew significantly. For local businesses, increased FDI inflow created more opportunity to partner with foreign firms through joint ventures and to supply parts and services for foreign firms, while also allowing locals to reap the benefits of technological spillover from FDI. Over time, these local businesses can develop their own production capacity, even becoming strategic partners with foreign investors.

According to the World Bank, Vietnam has been a development success story. Its economic reforms since the beginning of Đổi Mới in 1986 have helped to change Vietnam from being one of the world’s poorest nations to a middle-income economy in one generation.

=== Limitations ===
Despite significant reductions in poverty, regional and social disparities remained a challenge during the reform period. The poverty headcount ratio at $3.00 a day (2021 PPP) was 1.6% in 2021, while Vietnam's Gini index was 36.1 in 2022.

Research has also identified continuing disparities in healthcare access between rural and urban populations in Vietnam. A 2023 study of middle-aged women in a rapidly industrializing city identified rural-urban differences in healthcare-seeking behavior and recommended greater support for rural women in obtaining regular health checkups and counseling from healthcare providers. A 2025 study similarly found that health insurance coverage did not guarantee equitable access to care for many older adults, and that rural populations and ethnic minorities continued to face major barriers, including high out-of-pocket costs and catastrophic spending even when insured.

== Theoretical basis ==
The Communist Party of Vietnam maintains that the socialist-oriented market economy is consistent with the classical Marxist view of economic development and historical materialism, where socialism can only emerge once material conditions have been sufficiently developed to enable socialist relations. The socialist-oriented market model is seen as a key step for achieving the necessary economic growth and modernization while being able to co-exist in the contemporary global market economy and benefit from global trade. The Communist Party of Vietnam has re-affirmed its commitment to the development of a socialist economy with its Đổi Mới reforms.

== See also ==
- Economic history of Vietnam
- Five-Year Plans of Vietnam
- New Economic Policy
- Perestroika
- Socialism with Chinese characteristics
- Socialist market economy
- Socialist-oriented market economy
- State capitalism
- Transition economy
