= Ba Đình Hall =

Former parliament building in Hanoi, Vietnam

Coordinates: 21.0370°N 105.8374°E

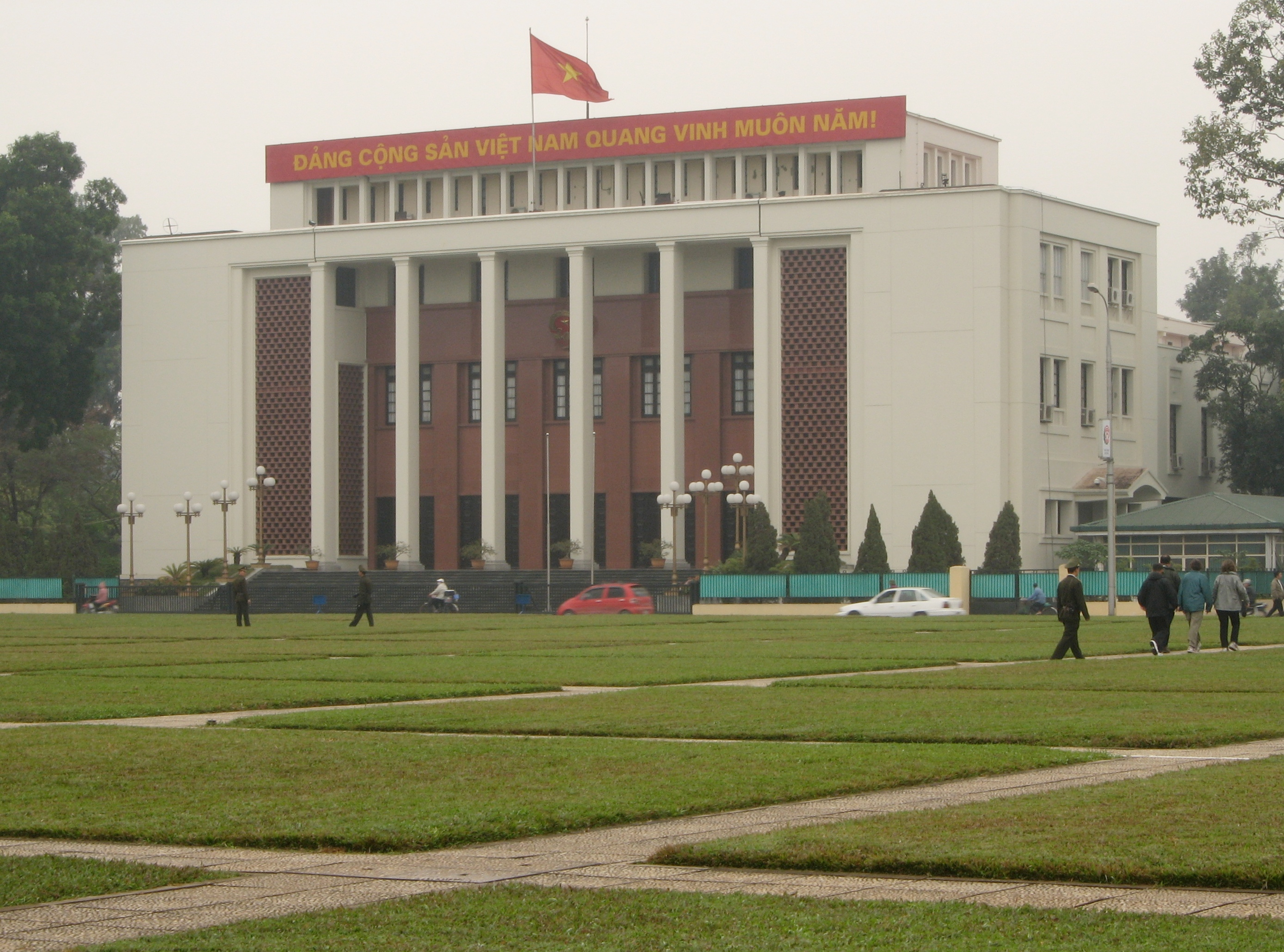
Ba Đình Hall in 2007

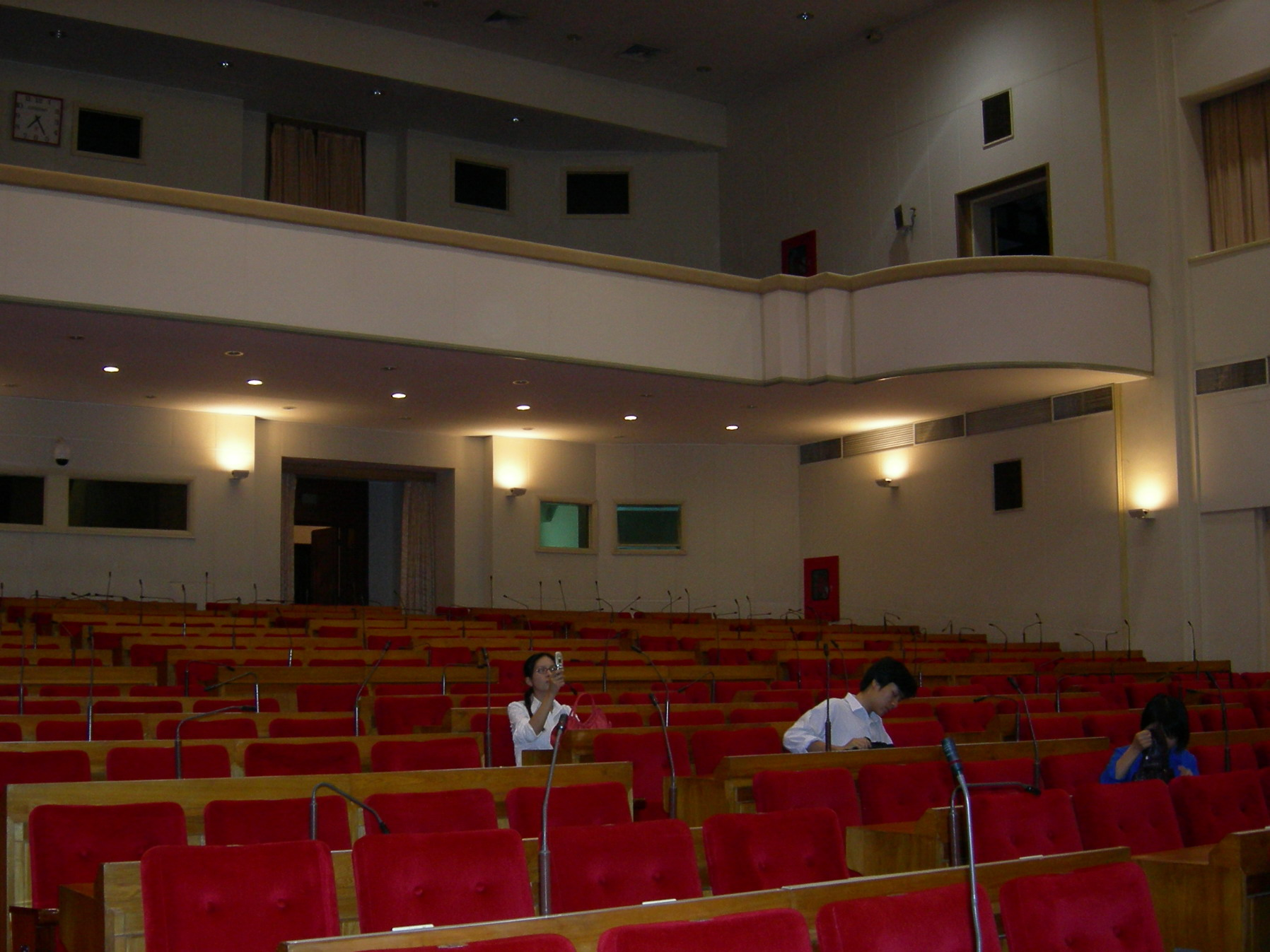
The main conference hall, as seen in 2006.

The old National Assembly Building (Nhà Quốc hội), also Ba Đình Hall (Hội trường Ba Đình), was a public large building, located on Ba Đình Square across the Ho Chi Minh Mausoleum, in Hanoi, Vietnam. The building was used by the National Assembly of Vietnam for its sessions and other official functions. One of the architects was Nguyễn Cao Luyện (1907–1987, vi). The hall was demolished in 2008 to make room for the new parliament house. However archaeological remains of the old imperial city of Hanoi, Thăng Long, were found on the site and therefore the construction of a new building on the site was delayed. General Giáp, objected to the demolition of Ba Đình Hall.
