= 6th National Congress of the Communist Party of Vietnam =

- The flag of the Communist Party of Vietnam
- Date: 15–18 December 1986 (4 days)
- Location: Ba Đình Hall
- Participants: 1,129 delegates (which includes the members of the 5th Central Committee)
- Outcome: The election of the 6th Central Committee

The 6th National Congress of the Communist Party of Vietnam (Vietnamese: Đại hội Đảng Cộng sản Việt Nam VI) (CPV) was held in Ba Đình Hall, Hanoi, between 15 and 18 December 1986. 1,129 delegates represented the party's estimated 1,900,000 members. The Congress occurs once every five years. Preparations for the 6th National Congress began with the 8th plenum of the 5th Central Committee and ended with the 10th plenum, which lasted 19 days. After the 10th plenum, local and provincial party organizations began electing delegates to the Congress as well as updating party documents.

The Congress is noteworthy because of the introduction of economic reforms, labelled Đổi Mới (Renovation), and the election of a new party leadership. The sitting General Secretary, Trường Chinh was not reelected, and Nguyễn Văn Linh took his place. The 6th Politburo, 6th Secretariat and the Control Commission were elected. The Advisory Council to the Central Committee was established, and contained high-ranking officials who had retired at the 6th National Congress. The 6th National Congress emphasized the need to strengthen the socialist mode of production.

== Background ==
=== The 8th plenum and reforms ===
The 8th plenum of the 5th Central Committee (10–17 June 1985)—and its antecedents the 6th (3–10 July 1984) and the 7th (11–17 December 1984) plenums—instructed the party to direct a performance review of its organization, personnel and efficiency. Lê Đức Thọ, head of the Central Organizing Commission, said the party had become "a cumbersome and ponderous mechanism, only marginally efficient, marked by ill-defined responsibilities and poorly divided functions." He further stated that confusion within the party over operational responsibilities between the central party leadership, mass organizations and the state, and between higher and lower party echelons had developed into a serious problem, and that a cynical collective mindset within the party had taken hold and manifested itself through corruption, inflexibility and dishonesty.

The plenum put forward three points to solve the problems alleged by Tho: (1) to get party cadres to focus on technical economic and management responsibilities, (2) cadres were to be organized and get specialized training in economic and administrative fields to reequip them with information on how to run an increasingly complex economy, and (3) engineer a shift in the internal balance of power. In a Nhân Dân (The People) editorial, Lê Đức Thọ stressed the need to go beyond political slogans and remonstration to enhance the level of management skills of party cadres in party-level organizations. Lê Đức Thọ wanted to change the party's role in the economy from that of implementer to one of supervisor. The central leadership faced an obstacle: most party cadres had what the party leadership considered an outdated education from 20 to 30 years ago, while the party lacked young cadres. To solve this problem, the central party leadership began talking about the need to introduce personnel planning, a retirement age, rotation of officials and tenure length for cadres and sensitive posts.

Early in the reform process, the CPV devolved some powers of the party secretaries to the district-level committees. The party planned to decentralize some duties and responsibilities at departmental and sectoral levels while empowering ward-level party organs by strengthening their role in economic planning, market management and public security, and trying to improve the performance of the Control Commission and its lower-level bodies. The party leadership tried to make the cumbersome bureaucracy efficient.

Economic reforms in 1985 led to rampant inflation, and the 9th plenum (mid-December 1985) forced the central leadership to reintroduce rationing in order to reduce the hardships for the poor, while in March 1985 the Council of Ministers legalized limited, small-scale, private enterprise in the handicraft and small industry sectors. The CPV tried to introduce market rules into the Soviet-style planned economy, while stressing the need to control the markets. At this early stage, the party started a discussion on how much state control and economic planning were necessary. On 8 April, the 5th Politburo issued the "Draft Resolution on guaranteeing autonomy to basic economic units", which decreed the implementation of the reform program agreed upon by the 8th plenum. The resolution tried to solve several problems by streamlining the bureaucracy to make it more efficient. However, while the party supported making state-owned enterprises more autonomous, they still sought the abolition of individual trade, i.e., trade not sanctioned by the state. At this stage, the authorities did not seek to alter the duties and responsibilities of central state and party organs.

=== Preparations ===
Planning for the 6th National Congress began at the 19-day-long 10th plenum of the 5th Central Committee (19 May – 9 June 1986). Lê Duẩn, the General Secretary, gave the opening speech, where he reaffirmed the central party leadership's commitment to reform. The 10th plenum unanimously approved the draft Political Report for the 6th National Congress. Preparations for the Congress began with party congresses at the grass-root and provincial-levels, during which delegates were elected.

Preparation for the Congress began slowly. According to a Central Organizing Commission conference, the lack of preparations were due to an unidentified number of party grassroots organs failing to prepare their personnel for the Congress, and superior echelons failing to inform lower-level echelons on the status of the Congress. The 5th Secretariat announced the organizing of a Criticism/Self-criticism campaign on 11 March on all party levels to prepare for the Congress. The campaign's main goals were to discipline party committees at the upcoming local party congresses; to assess the party's performance with an emphasis on economics since the 5th National Congress; to contribute to the future reorganization of the party and reassignment of personnel; and to ensure that the drafting of the Congress's resolutions were finished on time and to appoint new local executive committees in light of the requirements to implement reform. The 5th Secretariat published a list of requirements for possible candidates for membership in local executive committees in mid-March 1986, these were:

- (1) the ability of candidates to understand the economic and managerial skills articulated by the 8th plenum of the 5th Central Committee;
- (2) the need for young members within the party organization, with an emphasis on appointing officials to provincial-level executive committees in the age group 40–49, while officials aged 30–39 were to be appointed to district and grassroots executive committees;
- (3) to ensure geographical mobility and flexibility regarding personnel assignments.

=== District and provincial congresses and conferences ===
The local congresses preceding the 6th National Congress were far more organized than those held before the 5th National Congress. Unlike the previous Congress, the central party leadership issued instructions and training programs for party cadres on how to organize party congresses and conferences. Certain party cadres were made responsible for tutoring the executive committee directly subordinate to them on the Central Committee's draft Political Report. Local executive committees started convening conferences in early August to study the draft report. These conferences acted as precursors to the village-, municipal-, ward- and enterprise-level Party committee congresses, which started convening in mid-August. By early August, some grassroots-level party organs had begun the election of delegates to the 6th National Congress. At least five provinces had completed preparations for the basic-level party congresses by September, in four of these the basic-level congresses ran until late September.

District-level congresses convened in some provinces in late August, while other provinces started convening them in late September. According to the Vietnamese media, the district-level congresses mostly agreed on basic economic goals and several proposed amendments to the draft Political Report. At the Binh Tri Thien Provincial Party Organization, 250 cadres reportedly made 3,000 suggestions, "including amendments to and revision of the Draft Political Report" and concrete policies which featured prominently in it. The same occurred in the Standing Committee of the Hồ Chí Minh City Party Committee, where leading cadres unanimously approved a program for action and proposed changes to the draft Political Report. The Nha Trang Municipal Party Organization held a day-long conference discussing the Draft Political Report, which ended tepidly; the discussions were extended so that the delegates reached an unenthusiastic "identity of views" (what was discussed is unknown as the media did not state it). While other party conferences criticized the draft Political Report, several others expressed enthusiasm or unanimously supported it. Because the National Assembly failed to issue a draft of the 4th Five-Year Plan, the district-level conferences were forced to discuss mostly local economic aims because they lacked national economic data.

The Cuu Long conference held between 6 and 10 October was the first provincial-level conference to be held. By 22 October, 21 provinces had held provincial-level party conferences. The central party leadership faced less criticism on the draft Political Report and socio-economic policies from provincial-level conferences than from district-level conferences. The provincial-level conferences criticized central policies less and were evasive about critical issues. However, the provincial-level conferences were not completely dormant and scored some minor victories, such as reducing the average age needed to join an executive committee and they adopted a more flexible and efficient mode of planning and organization. As during the district-level conferences, there were certain convocations which attracted attention; the An Giang Party Committee criticized past economic performance, while the Ha Son Binh Congress criticized the irrational management of provincial economic affairs. While these committees criticized past policies or well-known deficiencies, none of them criticized the policies of the central party leadership.

General Secretary Trường Chinh in a speech to the Hồ Chí Minh City Party Organization admitted to "serious shortcomings and mistakes" by the central party leaders in economic leadership, and criticized the imposition of a superstructure on Vietnam's current conditions. Trường Chinh endorsed the program of the 8th plenum of the 5th Central Committee and "new economic concepts", but told the attendees that the 5th Politburo had undertaken a systematic assessment of economic policies, which included the continuation of a mixed economy, the acceptance of private ownership for the foreseeable future, the need to end bureaucratic centralism, and the need for decentralization in economic decision-making. In his speech to the 4th Congress of the Hồ Chí Minh City Party Organization, Nguyễn Văn Linh, a member of the 5th Politburo and 5th Secretariat, endorsed the platforms of the 6th, 7th and 8th plenums of the 5th Central Committee while supporting the conclusion reached at the 10th plenum of the 5th Central Committee. He emphasized several Politburo directives. Phạm Hùng, the Minister of Interior, in his speech to the Cuu Long Provincial Congress said that the reintroduction of the market economy and the renewed acceptance of private ownership would not hurt Vietnam's socialist transformation. To secure Vietnam's socialist credentials, the state would remain dominant to protect Vietnam from the uncontrolled free market. The 11th plenum (17–25 November 1986), the last plenum before the 6th Congress, endorsed the platform for the congress.

== The Congress ==
The 6th National Congress, convened from 15 to 18 December 1986, reaffirmed its commitment to the reform program of the 8th plenum of the 5th Central Committee, and issued five points:

- "concerted efforts to increase the production of food, consumer goods and exportable items";
- "continue the efforts to control small merchants and capitalists, while at the same time acknowledging the reality of supporting a mixed economy";
- "to regenerate the planning bureaucracy while making the economic management system more efficient by decentralizing authority and making room for more independent decision-making";
- "to clarify the powers and jurisdiction of the Council of Ministers, and the reorganization of state management apparatus to make it more efficient;
- "to improve party organizational capabilities, leadership and cadre training."

"The Central Committee, the Political Bureau, the Secretariat and the Council of Ministers were primarily responsible for the above-mentioned errors [economic crisis and overlapping bureaucracy] and shortcomings in the party leadership. It should be emphasized that the delay in correctly affecting a transition in the nucleus leading body was a direct cause for the inadequacy of party leadership in recent years in meeting the requirements of the new situation. The Central Committee wishes to self-criticize [itself] earnestly before the Congress over its shortcomings"

— a quote from the Political Report read by Trường Chinh to the 6th National Congress

In the Political Report delivered to the 6th National Congress on 15 December, Trường Chinh said that the Central Committee, the Politburo, the Secretariat and the Council of Ministers were responsible for their own inadequacies and Vietnam's economic failures. The report functioned as a severe self-criticism of the central party leadership. The leadership's failures were reiterated by a host of speakers, including Nguyễn Văn Linh, who spoke about the problems of "sluggish production, confusion in distribution systems, enduring socio-economic difficulties, and flagging confidence of the population". Nguyễn Thanh Bình, the Central Committee Secretary responsible for agriculture, echoed previous sentiments during the preparations for the Congress and spoke of the need for decentralization, household and family economics, and the introduction of an independent market. Võ Trần Chí, a member of the Standing Committee for the Hồ Chí Minh City Party Committee, affirmed the Congress's commitment to reform to strengthen productivity and managerial performance.

While supporting change, Trường Chinh in his Political Report talked about the validity of the party's organizational principles, which had governed Vietnam's economy. Democratic centralism was to remain unchanged, and centralized management of certain sectors were to be retained. In a closed session, the Presidium of the 6th National Congress on 18 December acknowledged the importance of the continued transformation of private industry and commerce and the validity of economic contracts between production and business units. He endorsed the state's role as a supplier of goods produced by state-owned enterprises and supported the long-time policy of labour distribution. These policies were passed, and underwrote the economic policies initiated at the 4th and 5th National Congresses. The party leadership's immediate goals set forth in the Political Report were: to restructure the production system; to readjust the investment outlay within the system; to continue the building and strengthening of the socialist relations of production; to utilize and develop the economic sectors in the correct way; to renovate the way economy was managed; to emphasize the role of science and technology in the economy; and to expand and to increase the effectiveness of Vietnam's foreign economic relations.

Neither the Political Report nor any of the speakers at the 6th National Congress signalled a shift in Vietnam's foreign policy. The Congress reaffirmed Vietnam's strong ties with the Soviet Union and its "special relationships" with the socialist states of Laos and Kampuchea (Cambodia). However, the Congress highlighted the need to strengthen its relationship with countries belonging to Comecon, the international communist trade organization. Yegor Ligachev, the head of the Soviet delegation to the Congress, surprised the Vietnamese and many foreign observers by announcing an economic aid package 8–9 billion rubles (11–13 billion US dollars) at the time, and was about equal per capita of aid given to South Vietnam by the United States before 1975. The Political Report mentioned the importance of Vietnam's relations with India and its continued membership in the Non-Aligned Movement. The Congress announced Vietnam's wishes to improve its relations with the capitalist world, specifically mentioning Sweden, Finland, France, Australia and Japan.

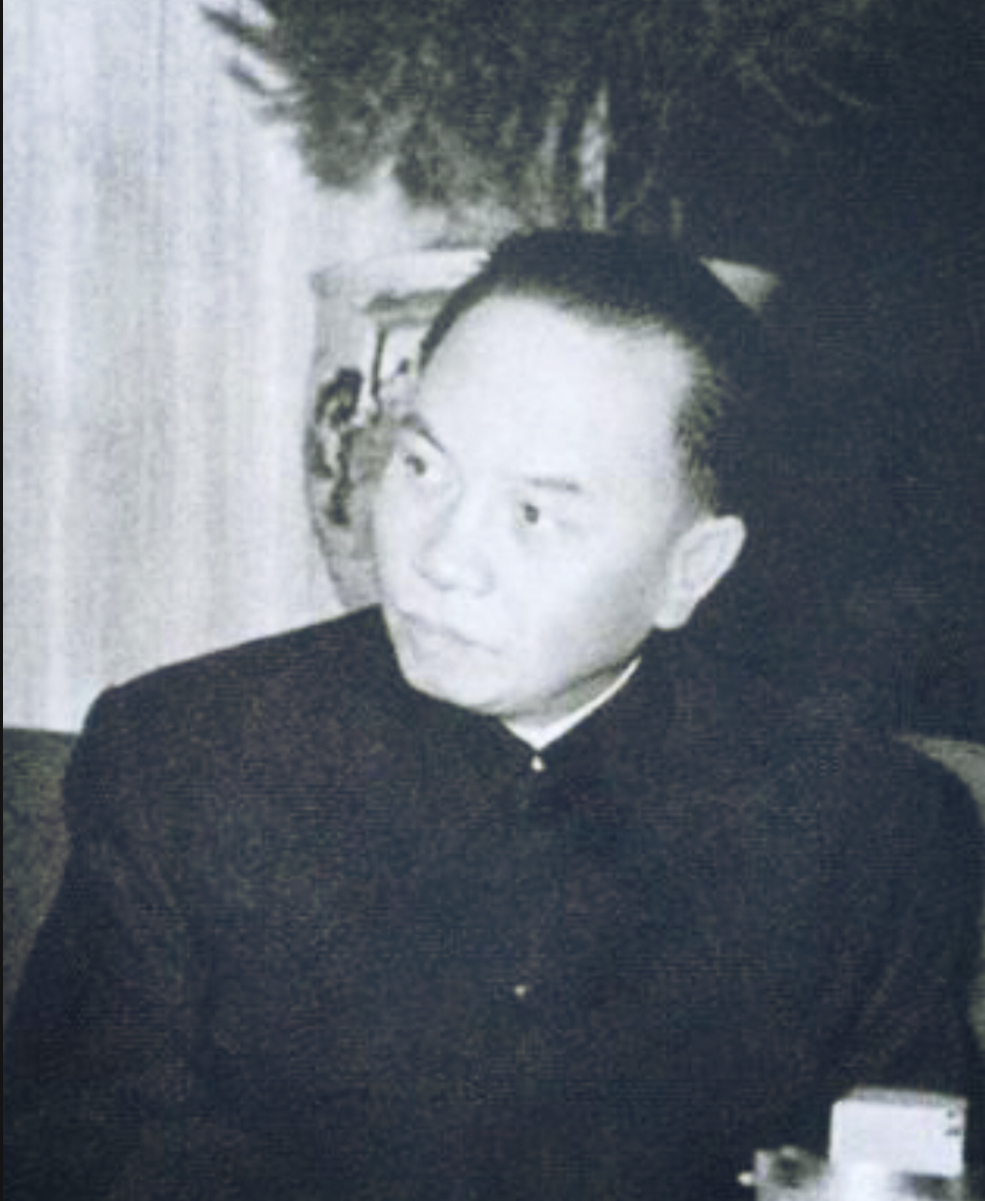
Trường Chinh stepped down as party General Secretary on 17 December, a rare event in communist politics

Võ Văn Kiệt, a deputy chairman of the Council of Ministers, delivered the Economic Report to the 6th National Congress. The political and economic reports stressed Đổi Mới (Renovation), and Vietnam specialist Carlyle Thayer wrote that Võ Văn Kiệt may have been the foremost advocate of this concept. In his speech to the Congress, Võ Văn Kiệt said, "in the economic field, there will be renovation in economic policies and the management system."Võ Văn Kiệt said that agriculture and not heavy industry would be most important during the 4th Five-Year Plan. During the 4th Five-Year Plan, Võ Văn Kiệt said, "[t]he ... main orientation for heavy industry in this stage is to support agriculture and light industry on a proper scale and at an appropriate technical level." Võ Văn Kiệt stressed the role of exports and the production of grain, food, and consumer goods to revitalize the Vietnamese economy. The main objective of the 4th Five-Year Plan was the production of grain and food products; "a target of 22–23 million metric tons of grain in paddy" was set for 1990. While several methods were to be used to reach this goal, material incentives and end-product contracts would play a prominent role.

The increases in grain and food production would in turn, according to the Economic Report, increase the production of consumer goods. The report stated that these policies were "aimed at ensuring the daily needs of the people, and the regeneration of the labour force, as well as attracting a million of labourers to solve the problem of employment for the people, and, on that basis, create the source of accumulation and an important source of export." According to the Economic Report, during the 4th Five-Year Plan, "the level of exports must be elevated by approximately 70 per cent over that of the previous five-year period". The export of agricultural products, "farm processing products, light industrial, small industrial, handicraft goods and aquatic and maritime products" were emphasized in the Economic Report. To achieve these goals, the Economic Report stated economic reforms to improve efficiency coupled with the importance of foreign investment and possible tourism revenues.

The 6th National Congress elected the 6th Central Committee. At the 4th, 5th and 6th National Congresses approximately 45 percent of full Central Committee members were retained, 18 percent of alternate members were promoted to full membership and 37 percent were newly elected to the Central Committee as either full or alternate members. The 6th Congress continued the trend of increasing the size of the Central Committee; membership comprised 124 full and 49 alternate members. Most of the new officials in the Central Committee were from the second generation of Vietnamese revolutionaries who gained prominence during Vietnam's struggle against French colonial rule in the 1940s and 1950s. The composition of the Central Committee changed at the 6th National Congress, with a notable increase of economic specialists, technocrats and provincial secretaries as members, but military representation in the Central Committee decreased. Only 8 percent of members of the 6th Central Committee were from the Vietnam People's Army. The number of central-level officials also decreased; 74 percent of the members of the 2nd Central Committee were central-level officials, while only 46 percent in the 6th Central Committee were from the centre. These changes reflected the party's overriding concern about basic problems.

=== 1st plenum of the 6th Central Committee ===
On 18 December at the end of the 6th National Congress, the delegates elected the 6th Central Committee, which contained eight more members than the 5th Central Committee, while alternate membership was increased by 13; the total membership of the new Central Committee was 173. Immediately after the 8th National Congress on 18 December, the 6th Central Committee convened its 1st plenum to elect the composition of the 6th Politburo, the 6th Secretariat, the Control Commission and other central-level party organs.

The 1st plenum of the 6th Central Committee brought an end to the protracted generational succession which had begun at the 4th National Congress in 1976. On 17 December, the Congress's third day, the three top leaders—Trường Chinh, Lê Đức Thọ—and head of government Phạm Văn Đồng, announced that they would not seek membership of the 6th Politburo or the 6th Central Committee. However, these three were appointed to the Advisory Council to the Central Committee. This was not new; at the 5th National Congress six senior members of the 5th Politburo retired. When asked by foreign journalists if the same pattern would continue, a party spokesman stated that it would continue at the 6th National Congress. Văn Tiến Dũng, the Minister of National Defense, retired from the politburo but retained his seat in the 6th Central Committee. The 1st plenum elected Nguyễn Văn Linh to succeed Trường Chinh as party General Secretary.

== Bibliography ==
- Stern, Lewis (1987). "The Vietnamese Communist Party in 1986: Party Reform Initiatives, the Scramble towards Economic Revitalization, and the Road to the Sixth National Congress". Southeast Asian Affairs. 14 (1). Institute of Southeast Asian Studies: 345–363. JSTOR 27908584.
- Thayer, Carlyle (June 1987). "Vietnam's Sixth Party Congress: An Overview". Contemporary Southeast Asia. 9 (1). Institute of Southeast Asian Studies: 12–22. JSTOR 25797929.
