= 8th Central Committee of the Communist Party of Vietnam =

Central Committee of the Communist Party of Vietnam

8th Central Committee
- Symbol of the Communist Party of Vietnam

1 July 1996 – 22 April 2001 (4 years, 295 days) Overview
- Type: Central Committee of the Communist Party of Vietnam
- Election: 8th National Congress

Leadership
- General Secretary: Đỗ Mười (July 1996-December 1997) - withdraw from the Politburo; Lê Khả Phiêu (December 1997-April 2001)
- Politburo Standing Committee: 5 members
- Politburo: 19 members

Members
- Total: 170 members

The 8th Central Committee of the Communist Party of Vietnam (CPV) was elected at the 8th CPV National Congress. It elected the 8th Politburo and the 8th Secretariat.

== Plenums ==
The Central Committee (CC) is not a permanent institution. Instead, it convenes plenary sessions between party congresses. When the CC is not in session, decision-making powers are delegated to its internal bodies; that is, the Politburo and the Secretariat. None of these organs are permanent bodies either; typically, they convene several times a month.

Plenary Sessions of the 8th Central Committee
Plenum	Date	Length	Ref.
1st Plenary Session	29 June 1996	1 day	
2nd Plenary Session	16–24 December 1996	9 days	
3rd Plenary Session	9–18 June 1997	8 days	
4th Plenary Session	22–29 December 1997	8 days	
5th Plenary Session	6–16 July 1998	11 days	
6th Plenary Session, 1st convocation	13–17 October 1998	5 days	
6th Plenary Session, 2nd convocation	25 January – 2 February 1999	9 days	
7th Plenary Session	9–16 August 1999	8 days	
8th Plenary Session	4–11 November 1999	8 days	
9th Plenary Session	10–19 April 2000	10 days	
10th Plenary Session	26 June – 4 July 2000	8 days	
11th Plenary Session, 1st convocation	6–16 January 2001	11 days	
11th Plenary Session, 2nd convocation	13–24 March 2001	12 days	
12th Plenary Session	7–10 April 2001	4 days	

== Composition ==
Members of the 8th Central Committee of the Communist Party of Vietnam
Name	7th CC	9th CC	BY	PM	Birthplace	Education	Ethnicity	Gender	Ref.
Nguyễn Văn An	Old	Reelected	1937	1959	Nam Định province	Electrical engineering	Kinh	Male	
Đỗ Văn Ân	Old	Not	1937	—	Hà Nam province	—	Kinh	Male	
Lê Đức Anh	Old	Resigned	1920	1938	Thừa Thiên Huế province	None	Kinh	Male	
Lê Hồng Anh	New	Reelected	1949	1968	Kiên Giang province	Political science	Kinh	Male	
Nguyễn Bá	Old	Not	1939	—	Nghệ An province	Finance	Kinh	Male	
Võ Đông Ba	New	Not					Kinh	Male	
Nguyễn Đình Bin	New	Not	1944	—	Hải Dương province	—	Kinh	Male	
Đào Đình Bình	New	Reelected	1945	—	Bắc Ninh province	—	Kinh	Male	
Nguyễn Đức Bình	Old	Not	1927	1945	Hà Tĩnh province	Philosophy	Kinh	Male	
Nguyễn Mạnh Cầm	Old	Not	1929	—	Nghệ An province	Russian studies	Kinh	Male	
Nguyễn Văn Chi	Old	Reelected	1945	1965	Đà Nẵng City	Economic Management	Kinh	Male	
Trần Thị Trung Chiến	New	Reelected	1946	—	Bến Tre province	Medicine	Kinh	Female	
Đặng Vũ Chư	Old	Not	1940	—	Nam Định province	—	Kinh	Male	
Vũ Đình Cự	Old	Not	1936	—	Thái Bình province	Physics	Kinh	Male	
Võ Văn Cương	Old	Not	1942	—	Tây Ninh Province	Economics & political science	Kinh	Male	
Nguyễn Văn Đăng	New	Reelected	1949	—	Bến Tre province	—	Kinh	Male	
Trần Văn Đăng	Old	Not	1933	—	Phú Thọ province	Engineering economics	Kinh	Male	
Nguyễn Khoa Điềm	New	Reelected	1943	—	Thừa Thiên Huế province	—	Kinh	Male	
Lư Văn Điền	Old	Not	1938	—	Cần Thơ province	None	Kinh	Male	
Phan Diễn	Old	Reelected	1937	1962	Quảng Nam province	—	Kinh	Male	
Chamaléa Điêu	New	Reelected	1948	—	Ninh Thuận province	—	Kinh	Male	
Nguyễn Cảnh Dinh	Old	Not	1934	—	Nghệ An province	Irrigation	Kinh	Male	
Lương Công Đoan	New	Died	1945	—	Phú Yên province	None	Kinh	Male	
Nguyễn Thị Doan	New	Reelected	1951	1981	Hà Nam province	Economics	Kinh	Female	
Hà Quang Dự	Old	Not	1945	—	Tuyên Quang province	Agricultural engineering	Tày	Male	
Hồ Nghĩa Dũng	New	Reelected	1950	1978	Đà Nẵng City	Steel rolling engineer	Kinh	Male	
Lê Văn Dũng	New	Reelected	1945	1965	Bến Tre province	Military science	Kinh	Male	
Nguyễn Tấn Dũng	Old	Reelected	1949	1967	Cà Mau province	Law	Kinh	Male	
Trương Quang Được	Old	Reelected	1940	—	Quảng Nam province	Mechanical engineering & economics	Kinh	Male	
Nguyễn Văn Được	New	Reelected	1946	—	Quảng Ngãi province	—	Kinh	Male	
Đỗ Bình Dương	Old	Reelected	1942	—	Bắc Giang province	—	Kinh	Male	
Nguyễn Khắc Dương	New	Not	1944	—	Thanh Hoá province	—	Kinh	Male	
Phạm Thế Duyệt	Old	Not	1936	1965	Hải Dương province	Mining engineering & economic management	Kinh	Male	
Lê Văn Dỹ	Old	Not	1934	1960	Long An province	Chemistry	Kinh	Male	
Trần Xuân Giá	New	Not	1939	—	Thừa Thiên Huế province	Economics	Kinh	Male	
Nguyễn Bình Giang	Old	Not	1940	—	Hà Nam province	Machine building engineering	Kinh	Male	
Phạm Minh Hạc	Old	Not	1935	—	Hà Nội City	Literature & psychology	Kinh	Male	
Nguyễn Ngô Hai	Old	Not	1941	1965	Nghệ An province	—	Kinh	Male	
Bùi Hữu Hải	New	Not	1942	—	Hải Hưng province	Agricultural engineering	Kinh	Male	
Trần Mai Hạnh	New	Not	1943	—	Hải Dương province	Literature	Kinh	Male	
Nguyễn Thị Hằng	Old	Reelected	1944	—	Hải Phòng City	Economics	Kinh	Female	
Cù Thị Hậu	Old	Reelected	1944	—	Phú Thọ province	—	Kinh	Female	
Nguyễn Minh Hiển	New	Reelected	1948	—	Thái Bình province	—	Kinh	Male	
Nguyễn Huy Hiệu	New	Reelected	1947	—	Nam Định province	Military science	Kinh	Male	
Nguyễn Văn Hiệu	Old	Not	1938	—	Hà Tây province	Physics	Kinh	Male	
Trương Mỹ Hoa	Old	Reelected	1945	—	Tiền Giang province	Economics & the arts	Kinh	Female	
Trần Hoà	New	Reelected	1946	—	Quảng Bình province	—	Kinh	Male	
Trần Đình Hoan	Old	Reelected	1939	1962	Hưng Yên province	Labour economics	Kinh	Male	
Nguyễn Đức Hoan	Old	Not	1938	—	Quảng Trị province	Agricultural engineering	Kinh	Male	
Trần Thị Minh Hoàng	New	Not	1945	—	Bà Rịa–Vũng Tàu province	None	Kinh	Female	
Vũ Tuyên Hoàng	Old	Not	1938	—	Hà Nội City	Agricultural science	Kinh	Male	
Đặng Thành Học	Old	Not	1938	—	Minh Hải province	—	Kinh	Male	
Hoàng Văn Hon	New	Reelected	1943	—	Hòa Bình province	—	Kinh	Male	
Nguyễn Thị Kim Hồng	Old	Reelected	1955	—	Tiền Giang province	—	Kinh	Female	
Võ Nhân Huân	New	Died	1946	—	—	—	Kinh	Male	
Bùi Văn Huấn	New	Reelected	1945	—	Đồng Tháp province	—	Kinh	Male	
Nguyễn Sinh Hùng	New	Reelected	1946	1977	Nghệ An province	Economics	Kinh	Male	
Vũ Quốc Hùng	Old	Reelected	1940	—	Hà Nội City	—	Kinh	Male	
Phan Thế Hùng	New	Not	1942	—	Hải Phòng City	Literature	Kinh	Male	
Lê Minh Hương	Old	Reelected	1936	—	Hà Tĩnh province	Military science	Kinh	Male	
Đặng Hữu	Old	Not	1930	—	Bình Định province	Transportation engineering	Kinh	Male	
Bùi Quang Huy	Old	Reelected	1941	—	Vĩnh Long	—	Kinh	Male	
Võ Đức Huy	New	Reelected	1950	—	Quảng Ngãi province	—	Kinh	Male	
Phan Văn Khải	Old	Reelected	1933	1959	Hồ Chí Minh City	Economics	Kinh	Male	
Phạm Gia Khiêm	New	Reelected	1944	1978	Hà Nội City	Political theory & metallurgy	Kinh	Male	
Hà Thị Khiết	Old	Reelected	1950	1969	Tuyên Quang province	Political science	Tày	Female	
Vũ Khoan	Old	Reelected	1937	—	Hà Tây province	Russian studies	Kinh	Male	
Đinh Hữu Khoá	New	Not					Kinh	Male	
Đoàn Khuê	Old	Not	1923	—	Quảng Trị province	Military science	Kinh	Male	
Cao Sỹ Kiêm	Old	Not	1941	1963	Thái Bình province	Economics	Kinh	Male	
Phan Trung Kiên	New	Reelected	1946	—	Hồ Chí Minh City	—	Kinh	Male	
Đoàn Văn Kiển	New	Not	1950	—	—	—	Kinh	Male	
Võ Văn Kiệt	Old	Resigned	1922	1939	Vĩnh Long province	None	Kinh	Male	
Vũ Trọng Kim	New	Reelected	1953	—	Quảng Nam province	Law & political science	Kinh	Male	
Hoàng Kỳ	New	Reelected	1946	—	Nam Định province	—	Kinh	Male	
Vũ Ngọc Kỳ	New	Reelected	1946	—	Yên Bái province	—	Kinh	Male	
Mai Thúc Lân	Old	Not	1935	—	Quảng Nam province	Agricultural engineering	Kinh	Male	
Đào Trọng Lịch	Old	Died	1939	1960	Vĩnh Phúc province	Military science	Kinh	Male	
Mai Kiều Liên	New	Not	1953	—	Hậu Giang province	—	Kinh	Female	
Ngô Xuân Lộc	Old	Not	1940	1963	Nam Định province	—	Kinh	Male	
Trần Đức Lương	Old	Reelected	1937	1961	Quảng Ngãi province	Geological engineering	Kinh	Male	
Bùi Danh Lưu	Old	Not	1935	—	Phú Thọ province	Transportation engineering	Kinh	Male	
Nông Đức Mạnh	Old	Reelected	1940	1963	Bắc Kạn Province	Economics & carpentry	Tày	Male	
Vũ Mão	Old	Reelected	1939	—	Nam Định province	Agricultural engineering & economics	Kinh	Male	
Nguyễn Ánh Minh	New	Reelected	1945	—	Quảng Ngãi province	—	Kinh	Male	
Nguyễn Thị Minh	Old	Not	1944	—	Tây Ninh province	None	Kinh	Female	
Đặng Vũ Minh	New	Reelected	1946	—	Nam Định province	—	Kinh	Male	
Nguyễn Thị Xuân Mỹ	Old	Not	1940	—	Hải Dương province	Law & economics	Kinh	Female	
Đỗ Hoài Nam	New	Reelected	1949	—	Bắc Ninh province	—	Kinh	Male	
Mai Văn Năm	New	Reelected	1948	—	Đà Nẵng City	—	Kinh	Male	
Thái Phụng Nê	Old	Not	1936	—	Phú Yên province	Hydropower engineering	Kinh	Male	
Phạm Thanh Ngân	Old	Not	1939	1961	Thái Nguyên province	Military science	Kinh	Male	
Hoàng Đức Nghi	Old	Not	1940	—	Cao Bằng province	Mechanical engineering	Tày	Male	
Hồ Tiến Nghị	New	Reelected	1940	—	Bắc Ninh province	Journalism	Kinh	Male	
Phạm Quang Nghị	New	Reelected	1949	1973	Thanh Hóa province	Philosophy & history	Kinh	Male	
Hoàng Văn Nghiên	Old	Reelected	1941	—	Nam Định province	Electronics	Kinh	Male	
Lê Huy Ngọ	Old	Reelected	1938	—	Thanh Hoá province	Agricultural engineering	Kinh	Male	
Tạ Quang Ngọc	New	Reelected	1944	—	Nghệ An province	—	Kinh	Male	
Trần Minh Ngọc	New	Not	1940	—	Nam Định province	—	Kinh	Male	
Võ Hồng Nhân	Old	Not	1944	—	Sa Đéc province	—	Kinh	Male	
Nguyễn Dy Niên	Old	Reelected	1935	—	Thanh Hoá province	Arts	Kinh	Male	
Tráng A Pao	Old	Reelected	1945	—	Lào Cai province	Economics	Hmong	Male	
Nguyễn Tấn Phát	New	Reelected	1944	—	Tiền Giang province	Pedagogy	Kinh	Male	
Lê Khả Phiêu	Old	Not	1931	1949	Thanh Hóa province	None	Kinh	Male	
Phạm Thanh Phong	New	Not	1942	—	Long An province	None	Kinh	Male	
Tòng Thị Phóng	New	Reelected	1954	1981	Sơn La province	Law	Thái	Female	
Lâm Phủ	New	Not					Khmer	Male	
Võ Hồng Phúc	New	Reelected	1945	1976	Hà Tĩnh province	Engineering economics	Kinh	Male	
Ksor Phước	New	Reelected	1954	—	Gia Lai province	—	Kinh	Male	
Đỗ Nguyên Phương	New	Reelected	1937	—	Hà Nội City	—	Kinh	Male	
Lò Văn Puốn	Old	Not	1940	—	Lai Châu province	Economic Management	Thái	Male	
Trần Hồng Quân	Old	Not	1937	—	Sóc Trăng province	Mechanical Engineering	Kinh	Male	
Nguyễn Văn Quân	New	Reelected	1949	—	Vĩnh Long province	—	Kinh	Male	
Nguyễn Duy Quý	Old	Not	1932	—	Nghệ An province	Philosophy	Kinh	Male	
Nguyễn Văn Rinh	New	Reelected	1942	1963	Hải Dương province	Military & political science	Kinh	Male	
Nguyễn Văn Rốp	New	Not	1949	—	Tây Ninh province	Political science	Kinh	Male	
Tô Huy Rứa	New	Reelected	1947	1967	Thanh Hóa province	Philosophy	Kinh	Male	
Đỗ Mười	Old	Resigned	1917	1939	Hà Nội City	None	Kinh	Male	
Chu Văn Rỵ	Old	Not					Kinh	Male	
Trương Tấn Sang	Old	Reelected	1949	1969	Long An province	Law	Kinh	Male	
Nguyễn Văn Son	New	Reelected	1946	1966	Hưng Yên province	Arts	Kinh	Male	
Phạm Thị Sơn	New	Not	1946	—	Bà Rịa–Vũng Tàu province	None	Kinh	Female	
Bùi Xuân Sơn	Old	Not	—	—	—	—	Kinh	Male	
Đỗ Trung Tá	New	Reelected	1945	—	Hà Nội City	Telecommunication	Kinh	Male	
Nguyễn Công Tạn	Old	Not	1935	—	Thái Bình province	Agricultural science	Kinh	Male	
Hoàng Tanh	Old	Not					Kinh	Male	
Sô Lây Tăng	Old	Not	1937	—	Kon Tum province	Medicine	Dẻ-Triêng	Male	
Nguyễn Văn Tâm	New	Not	1941	—	Hà Tây province	Pedagogy	Kinh	Male	
Nông Hồng Thái	Old	Not	1939	—	Cao Bằng province	Agronomy	Tày	Male	
Tạ Hữu Thanh	Old	Reelected	1942	—	Phú Thọ province	Banking	Kinh	Male	
Nguyễn Phúc Thanh	New	Reelected	1944	—	Hà Tây province	Military science	Kinh	Male	
Trần Thị Thanh Thanh	Old	Not	1940	—	Đà Nẵng City	Pedagogy	Kinh	Female	
Tổ Tử Thanh	New	Not					Kinh	Male	
Võ Thị Thắng	New	Reelected	1945	—	Long An province	History & law	Kinh	Female	
Trương Công Thận	Old	Not	1942	—	An Giang province	None	Kinh	Male	
Đào Trọng Thi	New	Reelected	1951	—	Hải Phòng City	—	Kinh	Male	
Ngô Yên Thi	New	Not	1945	—	Thừa Thiên Huế province	Law	Kinh	Male	
Nguyễn Hữu Thọ	New	Not	1910	—	Hồ Chí Minh City	Law	Kinh	Male	
Phạm Văn Thọ	Old	Reelected	1945	—	Hải Dương province	—	Kinh	Male	
Nguyễn Văn Thới	New	Not					Kinh	Male	
Nguyễn Thị Hoài Thu	New	Reelected	1943	—	Tiền Giang province	Political science	Kinh	Female	
Hoàng Thừa	Old	Died	1937	—	Hà Giang province	Economics	Tày	Male	
Lê Thế Tiệm	New	Reelected	1949	—	Quảng Nam province	—	Kinh	Male	
Nguyễn Khánh Toàn	New	Reelected	1945	—	Quảng Trị province	Law	Kinh	Male	
Ma Thanh Toàn	New	Reelected	1944	—	Cao Bằng province	—	Kinh	Male	
Tô Xuân Toàn	Old	Not	1937	—	Ninh Bình province	Agricultural science	Kinh	Male	
Phạm Văn Trà	Old	Reelected	1935	—	Bắc Ninh province	Military science	Kinh	Male	
Hà Mạnh Trí	Old	Reelected	1942	—	Thái Bình province	Law	Kinh	Male	
Nguyễn Thế Trị	Old	Reelected	1940	—	Hải Dương province	—	Kinh	Male	
Nguyễn Minh Triết	Old	Reelected	1942	1965	Bình Dương province	Mathematics & political science	Kinh	Male	
Nguyễn Đức Triều	Old	Reelected	1942	—	Thái Bình province	Economics	Kinh	Male	
Đỗ Ngọc Trinh	New	Not					Kinh	Male	
Nguyễn Tấn Trịnh	Old	Not	1936	—	Quảng Nam province	Fisheries science	Kinh	Male	
Nguyễn Phú Trọng	Old	Reelected	1944	1968	Hà Nội City	Political science & philology	Kinh	Male	
Trương Vĩnh Trọng	Old	Reelected	1942	—	Bến Tre province	Literature & economic management	Kinh	Male	
Đinh Trung	Old	Not					Kinh	Male	
Đỗ Quang Trung	Old	Reelected	1946	—	Hà Nội City	—	Kinh	Male	
Vũ Xuân Trường	New	Not					Kinh	Male	
Lê Văn Tu	Old	Not	1936	—	Thanh Hoá province	Metallurgical Engineering	Kinh	Male	
Trần Văn Tuấn	New	Reelected					Kinh	Male	
Lê Xuân Tùng	Old	Not	1936	—	Hà Tĩnh province	Economics	Kinh	Male	
Trương Đình Tuyển	New	Reelected	1942	—	Nghệ An province	Machine building engineering	Kinh	Male	
Nguyễn Văn Tự	Old	Reelected	1949	—	Khánh Hòa province	—	Kinh	Male	
Nguyễn Đình Tứ	Old	Died	1932	—	Nghệ Tĩnh province	Mathematics & physics	Kinh	Male	
Nguyễn Thị Hồng Vân	Old	Not	1944	—	Phú Khánh province	None	Kinh	Female	
Hồ Đức Việt	Old	Reelected	1947	1967	Nghệ An province	Mathematics & physics	Kinh	Male	
Hồng Vinh	New	Reelected	1945	—	Nam Định province	—	Kinh	Male	
Trần Văn Vụ	Old	Not					Kinh	Male	
Lê Danh Xương	Old	Not					Kinh	Male	
Nguyễn Văn Yểu	New	Reelected	1942	—	Hưng Yên province	Law	Kinh	Male	

== Bibliography ==
- Guan, Ang Cheng (2002). "Vietnam: Another Milestone and the Country Plods On". Southeast Asian Affairs. 2002. ISEAS–Yusof Ishak Institute: 345–356. JSTOR 27913216.
- Hung, Nguyen Manh (2000). "Vietnam in 1999: The Party's Choice". Asian Survey. 40 (1). University of California Press: 98–111. doi:10.2307/3021225. JSTOR 3021225.
- Vasavakul, Thaveeporn (1998). "Vietnam's One-Party Rule and Socialist Democracy?". Southeast Asian Affairs. ISEAS–Yusof Ishak Institute: 309–327. JSTOR 27912210.
- Thayer, Carlyle (2001). "Vietnam in 2000: Toward the Ninth Party Congress". Asian Survey. 41 (1). University of California Press: 81–89. doi:10.1525/as.2001.41.1.181. JSTOR 10.1525/as.2001.41.1.181.
