= 9th National Congress of the Communist Party of Vietnam =

Instance of the quinquennial congress of a political party

- The flag of the Communist Party of Vietnam
- Date: 19–22 April 2001 (4 days)
- Location: Ba Đình Hall
- Participants: 1,168 delegates (which includes the members of the 8th Central Committee)
- Outcome: The election of the 9th Central Committee

The 9th National Congress of the Communist Party of Vietnam (Vietnamese: Đại hội Đảng Cộng sản Việt Nam IX) was held in Ba Đình Hall, Hanoi from 19 to 22 April 2001. The congress occurs once every five years. A total of 1,168 delegates represented the party's 2,479,719 card-carrying members.

== Preparations ==
=== Dismissals and reassignments ===
Planning for the 9th National Congress began in August 1999 at the 7th plenum of the 8th Central Committee. Preparatory work for the congress began at the 8th plenum of the 8th Central Committee "by assigning various organizational tasks to senior party officials." After the 8th plenum several officials lost their post because of either disciplinary cases, government reshuffling or reassignment within the party. These changes were implemented because of widespread criticism of the Communist Party of Vietnam's (CPV) tackling of corruption, and in order to strengthen the coherence of national policy and its implementation. A statement issued by the 8th plenum stated that Ngô Xuân Lộc, a Deputy Prime Minister, and Cao Sĩ Kiêm, a party official working in the economic sector, had been given disciplinary warnings. In addition, the 8th plenum recommended to dismiss Ngô Xuân Lộc as a Deputy Prime Minister because of implication in the Thanh Long amusement park scandal. Cao Sĩ Kiêm on the other hand was criticised for mismanaging loans that resulted in a sudden increase in bad debts.

In December, the National Assembly dismissed Ngô Xuân Lộc as Deputy Prime Minister on the grounds of him being implicated in the Thanh Long scandal and for neglecting his duties. Nguyễn Tấn Dũng, a member of the 8th Politburo who held the posts of Deputy Prime Minister and Governor of the State Bank, had to relinquish his position as State Bank governor to his deputy Lê Đức Thúy. He was later made First Deputy Prime Minister and became responsible for supervising the works of the three other deputy prime ministers. Late in January 2001, the Standing Committee of the National Assembly announced that Nguyễn Mạnh Cầm had left his position as Minister of Foreign Affairs so as to be able to concentrate on his duties as a deputy prime minister. (Note: Nguyễn Dy Niên succeeded Nguyễn Mạnh Cầm as foreign minister.) Trương Đình Tuyển, the Minister of Trade, resigned and was succeeded by Vũ Khoan. Similar changes occurred within the party organization – for instance, Trương Tấn Sang, the Secretary of the Hồ Chí Minh City Party Committee, was reassigned to head the CPV's Central Economic Commission. Similar changes occurred with at least seven other party officials.

=== Lê Khả Phiêu's downfall ===
During 2000, Lê Khả Phiêu, the General Secretary of the 8th Central Committee, attempted to shore up support within the party for his reelection for a second term as general secretary. The 9th plenum of the 8th Central Committee (10–19 April) discussed draft proposals to strengthen the decision-making process at the top of the party. Three options were up for discussion; introducing direct elections of the Politburo Standing Committee by the Central Committee, to reestablish the Secretariat (abolished at the 8th National Congress), and the retention of the Politburo Standing Committee while at the same time reviving the Secretariat. After a visit to France, Lê Khả Phiêu reportedly tried to amend the state constitution and the CPV statutes to as to allow him to serve concurrently as general secretary and state president. His stewardship as general secretary was severely tested by rural unrest, the Asian financial crisis, and the continued influence of the Advisors to the Central Committee, most prominently among them being Đỗ Mười, Lê Khả Phiêu's predecessor as general secretary. Đỗ Mười still retained policy influence during Lê Khả Phiêu's term in office, and while he was no longer a member of the Politburo, he attended the meetings of the 8th Politburo. He was appointed the convenor of the 9th National Congress, a post which gave him considerable influence over congress proceedings. Anyway, Đỗ Mười together with Võ Văn Kiệt and Lê Đức Anh sent a joint letter to the 8th Central Committee which criticized Lê Khả Phiêu's leadership.

The first session of the 11th plenum of the 8th Central Committee (held in January 2001), issued a statement which said that no one over the age of 65 could be re-elected to the Central Committee, or any other central party position. However, after a hard-led counter-offensive by Lê Khả Phiêu, another statement by the Central Committee was issued which stated that certain exceptions could be made by "key cadres". Lê Khả Phiêu pointed to a wave of demonstrations by ethnic minorities in the Central Highland in February 2001 for a reason to stay in office, so as to assure stability. By the end of the second session of the 11th plenum it looked to outsiders that his position was secure. In a mid-April Politburo meeting, two-thirds of its members voted to retain Lê Khả Phiêu as general secretary, but on 17 April at the 12th plenum the Central Committee overturned the politburo's decision (in itself a very rare event) and voted to oust him from office.

=== Documents ===
At the 9th plenum of the 8th Central Committee, attended by the advisors to the Central Committee, discussed the drafting of four documents; the Political Report, the Socioeconomic Strategy for the 2001–2010 Period, the 7th Five-Year Plan (2001–2005), and the Report on the Revision of the Party Statutes. Nguyễn Phú Trọng, a member of the 8th Politburo and the Secretary of the Hanoi Party Committee, briefed the 9th plenum on the contentious matter that still needed to be discussed, such as sections of the Political Report and the need for further amendments to the party's statutes. The 10th plenum of the 8th Central Committee (26 June – 4 July), according to an official communique, "laid the ground work for the 9th National Party Congress." In the aftermath of the 10th plenum, the Vietnamese media gave increasing attention to internal party discussions and the then confidential political report, Bringing into Full Play the Strength of the Entire Nation, Continuing the Renovation Process, Accelerating Industrialization and Modernization, Building and Defending the Socialist Vietnamese Fatherland. The Political Report signalled no major changes from the political report given to the 8th National Congress. However, there were some minor changes. For instance, previously party documents had stated that the party and state's long term policy was "to develop the commodity-based multi-sector economy operating in accordance with the state-managed, socialist-orientated market mechanism", but the political report to the 9th National Congress condensed this into a single phrase, "to develop a socialist-oriented market economy." The political report still gave prominence to Hồ Chí Minh Thought, the period of transition to socialism (which can be shortened by "orderly steps and big leaps forward"), the leading role given to the state and cooperatives in the economy, and class struggle. According to the Political Report, "The principal content of class struggle is to successfully pursue the goal of industrialization and modernization along the lines of socialism, to struggle to frustrate all schemes and acts of sabotage by hostile forces, and to build Vietnam into a prosperous socialist country."

== Delegates ==
During the final quarter of 2000, and the beginning of 2001, party congresses were held at grassroots and provincial levels to elect the delegates to the 9th National Congress.

== The Congress and the 1st plenum ==
The 9th National Congress met from 19 to 22 April 2001. The elected Central Committee, the 9th, was composed of 150-members (the 8th Central Committee had 170 members). Of these, 87 had been members of the 8th Central Committee, the rest, 63 in total, were new members. The 9th Central Committee comprised primarily incumbent officials who held posts in either the central government or were provincial leaders. Lê Minh Hương, a member of the 9th Politburo and Minister of Public Security, led the five-member security bloc in the Central Committee, while Lê Hồng Anh was a prominent member of the bloc responsible for internal security. A third group, led by Nguyễn Văn An, the head of the Central Organizing and Personnel Commission, led what Carlyle Thayer referred to as the "personnel bloc".

The 1st plenum of the 9th Central Committee, held on 22 April, elected the 9th Politburo. The 9th Politburo consisted of 15 members (the 8th Politburo had 19 members). Nguyễn Tấn Dũng and Nguyễn Minh Triết, both considered reformers by outside observers, rose within the Politburo hierarchy, but so did Lê Minh Hương and Nguyễn Phú Trọng, who are labelled conservatives by outside observers. Lê Hồng Anh, the Chairman of the Central Inspection Commission, was a newcomer to the Politburo and was ranked ninth, "above two incumbent members". Military representation within the Politburo was reduced from four members in the 8th Politburo to one, General Phạm Văn Trà, in the 9th Politburo. In contrast, military representation within the Central Committee increased overall from the 8th Central Committee, but with the majority of military members being incumbents.

The Politburo Standing Committee and the Advisory Council to the Central Committee were abolished at the congress, and the Secretariat was reestablished. The Secretariat was elected by the 1st plenum of the 9th Central Committee. The abolishment of the Advisory Council effectively ended the behind-the-scenes influence of senior retirees. The congress reaffirmed Vietnam's plans of accelerating industrialization and modernization in order to become a modern-industrialized state by 2020, and adopted the 7th Five-Year Plan and the Socioeconomic Strategy for the 2001–2010. According to Carlyle Thayer, these documents "called for self-reliance, mobilization of domestic capital, the development of Vietnam's comparative advantage, and attracting external resources in the form of foreign investment capital, new technology, and managerial expertise." The Political Report stressed the need to retain good relations with fellow socialist states and neighboring countries, while at the same time improving relations with the capitalist world.

Lê Khả Phiêu stepped down as general secretary at the 1st plenum, and was succeeded by Nông Đức Mạnh. Hu Jintao, shortly prior to becoming the General Secretary of the Chinese Communist Party, served as an honorary delegate to the 9th National Congress and was rumored for lobbying on Lê Khả Phiêu's retention as general secretary on China's behalf. After his election to the general secretaryship, Nông Đức Mạnh pledged to Hu Jintao that "the relationship between Vietnam and China will develop better and better in the days to come." Not long after did Nông Đức Mạnh meet personally with then CCP general secretary Jiang Zemin.

== Bibliography ==
- Abuza, Zachary (April 2002). "The Lessons of Le Kha Phieu: Changing Rules in Vietnamese politics" (PDF). Contemporary Southeast Asia. 24 (1) CS24-1h. Institute of Southeast Asian Studies: 121–145. doi:10.1355/cs24-1h (inactive 1 July 2025). Archived from the original (PDF) on 2016-03-04.
- Thayer, Carlyle (January 2001). "Vietnam in 2000: Toward the Ninth Party Congress". Asian Survey. 41 (1). University of California Press: 181–188. doi:10.1525/as.2001.41.1.181. JSTOR 10.1525/as.2001.41.1.181.
- Thayer, Carlyle (January 2002). "Vietnam in 2001: The Ninth Party Congress and After". Asian Survey. 42 (1). University of California Press: 81–89. doi:10.1525/as.2002.42.1.81. JSTOR 10.1525/as.2002.42.1.81.
