= 9th Secretariat of the Communist Party of Vietnam =

Secretariat of Vietnam's Communist Party

The 9th Secretariat of the Communist Party of Vietnam (CPV), formally the 9th Secretariat of the Central Committee of the Communist Party of Vietnam (Vietnamese: Ban Bí thư Ban Chấp hành Trung ương Đảng Cộng sản Việt Nam Khoá IX), was partly elected by a decision of the 9th Politburo and partly elected by the 1st Plenary Session of the 9th Central Committee (CC) in the immediate aftermath of the 9th National Congress.

== Members ==
Members of the 9th Secretariat of the Communist Party of Vietnam
Rank	Name	8th PSC		10th SEC		Birth	PM	Birthplace	Education	Ethnicity	Gender	Ref.
Rank	Name	New	Rank	New	Rank	Birth	PM	Birthplace	Education	Ethnicity	Gender	Ref.
1	Nông Đức Mạnh	Old	4	Reelected	1	1940	1963	Bắc Kạn Province	Graduate	Tày	Male	
2	Lê Hồng Anh	New	—	Resigned	—	1949	1968	Kiên Giang province	Political science	Kinh	Male	
3	Nguyễn Văn An	New	—	Resigned	—	1937	1959	Nam Định province	Electrical engineering	Kinh	Male	
4	Trần Đình Hoan	New	—	Not	—	1939	1962	Hưng Yên province	Labour economics	Kinh	Male	
5	Nguyễn Khoa Điềm	New	—	Not	—	1943	—	Thừa Thiên Huế province	—	Kinh	Male	
6	Lê Văn Dũng	New	—	Reelected	6	1945	1965	Bến Tre province	Military science	Kinh	Male	
7	Tòng Thị Phóng	New	—	Reelected	7	1954	1981	Sơn La province	Law	Thái	Female	
8	Trương Vĩnh Trọng	New	—	Reelected	3	1942	—	Bến Tre province	Literature & economic management	Kinh	Male	
9	Vũ Khoan	New	—	Not	—	1937	—	Hà Tây province	Russian studies	Kinh	Male	
10	Phan Diễn	By-election	—	Not	—	1937	1962	Quảng Nam province	—	Kinh	Male	
11	Nguyễn Văn Chi	By-election	—	Reelected	4	1945	1965	Đà Nẵng City	Economic Management	Kinh	Male	

== Bibliography ==
- Truong, Mai (2022). "Declining opportunities for speaking out: The impact of Vietnam's new leadership on grassroots collective action". Asian Journal of Comparative Politics. OnlineFirst. doi:10.1177/20578911221139764. S2CID 254009559.
