= 9th Central Committee of the Communist Party of Vietnam =

Central Committee of the Communist Party of Vietnam

9th Central Committee
- Symbol of the Communist Party of Vietnam

22 April 2001 – 25 April 2006 (5 years, 3 days) Overview
- Type: Central Committee of the Communist Party of Vietnam
- Election: 9th National Congress

Leadership
- General Secretary: Nông Đức Mạnh
- Politburo: 15 members
- Secretariat: 9 members

Members
- Total: 150 members

The 9th Central Committee of the Communist Party of Vietnam was elected at the 9th National Congress of the Communist Party of Vietnam. It elected the 9th Politburo and the 9th Secretariat.

== Plenums ==
The Central Committee (CC) is not a permanent institution. Instead, it convenes plenary sessions between party congresses. When the CC is not in session, decision-making powers are delegated to its internal bodies; that is, the Politburo and the Secretariat. None of these organs are permanent bodies either; typically, they convene several times a month.

Plenary Sessions of the 9th Central Committee
Plenum	Date	Length	Ref.
1st Plenary Session	22 April 2001	1 day	
2nd Plenary Session	9–10 June 2001	2 days	
3rd Plenary Session	13–22 August 2001	6 days	
4th Plenary Session	5–13 November 2001	9 days	
5th Plenary Session	18 February – 2 March 2002	13 days	
6th Plenary Session	4–15 July 2002	12 days	
7th Plenary Session	7–9 November 2002	3 days	
8th Plenary Session	2 July 2003	1 day	
9th Plenary Session	5–12 January 2004	8 days	
10th Plenary Session	5–10 July 2004	6 days	
11th Plenary Session	17–25 January 2005	9 days	
12th Plenary Session	4–13 July 2005	7 days	
13th Plenary Session	11–18 January 2006	8 days	
14th Plenary Session	20–24 March 2006	5 days	
15th Plenary Session	14–16 April 2006	3 days	

== Composition ==
Members of the 9th Central Committee of the Communist Party of Vietnam
Name	8th CC	10th CC	BY	PM	Birthplace	Education	Ethnicity	Gender	Ref.
Nguyễn Văn An	Old	Not	1937	1959	Nam Định province	Electrical engineering	Kinh	Male	
Lê Hồng Anh	Old	Reelected	1949	1968	Kiên Giang province	Political science	Kinh	Male	
Lê Thị Bân	New	Reelected	1950	—	Hồ Chí Minh City	—	Kinh	Female	
Trịnh Long Biên	New	Reelected	1948	—	Bắc Giang province	—	Kinh	Male	
Đào Đình Bình	Old	Not	1945	—	Bắc Ninh province	—	Kinh	Male	
Nguyễn Thái Bình	New	Reelected	1954	1973	Trà Vinh province	Law & political science	Kinh	Male	
Nguyễn Văn Chi	Old	Reelected	1945	1965	Đà Nẵng City	Economic Management	Kinh	Male	
Trần Thị Trung Chiến	Old	Not	1946	—	Bến Tre province	Medicine	Kinh	Female	
Vũ Tiến Chiến	New	Reelected	1947	—	Hà Tây province	—	Kinh	Male	
Nguyễn Văn Chiền	New	Reelected	1945	1965	Đà Nẵng City	—	Kinh	Male	
Hoàng Xuân Cừ	New	Reelected	1946	—	Phú Thọ province	—	Kinh	Male	
Nguyễn Quốc Cường	New	Reelected	1952	1973	Bắc Giang province	Agricultural engineering	Kinh	Male	
Huỳnh Đảm	New	Reelected	1948	1968	Cà Mau province	Economics & law	Kinh	Male	
Nguyễn Văn Đẳng	Old	Reelected	1949	—	Bến Tre province	—	Kinh	Male	
Phan Tấn Đạt	New	Reelected	1949	—	Bạc Liêu province	—	Kinh	Male	
Nguyễn Khoa Điềm	Old	Not	1943	—	Thừa Thiên Huế province	—	Kinh	Male	
Phan Diễn	Old	Not	1937	1962	Quảng Nam province	—	Kinh	Male	
Chamaléa Điêu	Old	Not	1948	—	Ninh Thuận province	—	Kinh	Male	
Nguyễn Thị Doan	Old	Reelected	1951	1981	Hà Nam province	Economics	Kinh	Female	
Ngô Văn Dụ	New	Reelected	1947	1969	Vĩnh Phúc province	Economics	Kinh	Male	
Hồ Nghĩa Dũng	Old	Reelected	1950	1978	Đà Nẵng City	Steel rolling engineer	Kinh	Male	
Lê Văn Dũng	Old	Reelected	1945	1965	Bến Tre province	Military science	Kinh	Male	
Nguyễn Tấn Dũng	Old	Reelected	1949	1967	Cà Mau province	Law	Kinh	Male	
Nguyễn Văn Được	Old	Reelected	1946	—	Quảng Ngãi province	—	Kinh	Male	
Trương Quang Được	Old	Not	1940	—	Quảng Nam province	Mechanical engineering & economics	Kinh	Male	
Đỗ Bình Dương	New	Not	1942	—	Bắc Giang province	—	Kinh	Male	
Mai Thế Dương	New	Reelected	1954	—	Vĩnh Phúc province	—	Tày	Male	
Lê Nam Giới	New	Not	1946	—	Cần Thơ City	Arts	Kinh	Male	
Hoàng Trung Hải	New	Reelected	1959	1990	Thái Bình province	Business admin. & electrical engineering	Kinh	Male	
Lê Thanh Hải	New	Reelected	1950	1968	Tiền Giang province	Economics & the arts	Kinh	Male	
Nguyễn Thị Hằng	Old	Not	1944	—	Hải Phòng City	Economics	Kinh	Female	
Nguyễn Đức Hạt	New	Reelected	1945	—	Quảng Nam province	—	Kinh	Male	
Cù Thị Hậu	Old	Not	1944	—	Phú Thọ province	—	Kinh	Female	
Vũ Văn Hiến	New	Reelected	1947	1981	Hưng Yên province	Arts	Kinh	Male	
Hà Văn Hiền	New	Reelected	1948	1975	Hải Dương province	Mechanical engineering	Kinh	Male	
Vũ Văn Hiền	New	Reelected	1950	1972	Hải Dương province	Economics and politics	Kinh	Male	
Nguyễn Minh Hiển	Old	Not	1948	—	Thái Bình province	—	Kinh	Male	
Nguyễn Văn Hiện	New	Reelected	1954	1976	Ninh Bình province	Military science	Kinh	Male	
Nguyễn Huy Hiệu	Old	Reelected	1947	—	Nam Định province	Military science	Kinh	Male	
Trương Mỹ Hoa	Old	Not	1945	—	Tiền Giang province	Economics & the arts	Kinh	Female	
Trần Hòa	Old	Not	1946	—	Quảng Bình province	—	Kinh	Male	
Trần Đình Hoan	Old	Not	1939	1962	Hưng Yên province	Labour economics	Kinh	Male	
Hoàng Công Hoàn	New	Not	1959	—	Lạng Sơn province	Economics	Kinh	Male	
Hoàng Văn Hon	Old	Not	1943	—	Hòa Bình province	—	Kinh	Male	
Nguyễn Thị Kim Hồng	Old	Not	1955	—	Tiền Giang province	—	Kinh	Female	
Lê Doãn Hợp	New	Reelected	1951	1970	Nghệ An province	Economics	Kinh	Male	
Bùi Văn Huấn	Old	Reelected	1945	—	Đồng Tháp province	—	Kinh	Male	
Nguyễn Sinh Hùng	Old	Reelected	1946	1977	Nghệ An province	Economics	Kinh	Male	
Vũ Quốc Hùng	Old	Not	1940	—	Hà Nội City	—	Kinh	Male	
Lê Minh Hương	Old	Not	1936	—	Hà Tĩnh province	Military science	Kinh	Male	
Nguyễn Văn Hưởng	New	Reelected	1946	—	Quảng Ninh province	—	Kinh	Male	
Bùi Quang Huy	Old	Not	1941	—	Vĩnh Long	—	Kinh	Male	
Võ Đức Huy	Old	Reelected	1950	—	Quảng Ngãi province	—	Kinh	Male	
Đinh Thế Huynh	New	Reelected	1953	1974	Nam Định province	Journalism & political theory	Kinh	Male	
Huỳnh Hữu Kha	New	Not	1946	—	Tiền Giang province	—	Kinh	Male	
Phan Văn Khải	Old	Not	1933	1959	Hồ Chí Minh City	Economics	Kinh	Male	
Nguyễn Tuấn Khanh	New	Reelected	1954	1984	An Giang province	Political science & biology	Kinh	Male	
Phạm Gia Khiêm	Old	Reelected	1944	1978	Hà Nội City	Political theory & metallurgy	Kinh	Male	
Hà Thị Khiết	Old	Reelected	1950	1969	Tuyên Quang province	Political science	Tày	Female	
Vũ Khoan	Old	Not	1937	—	Hà Tây province	Russian studies	Kinh	Male	
Nguyễn Đức Kiên	New	Reelected	1948	1968	Hải Dương province	Political theory & economics	Kinh	Male	
Phan Trung Kiên	Old	Reelected	1946	—	Hồ Chí Minh City	—	Kinh	Male	
Vũ Trọng Kim	Old	Reelected	1953	—	Quảng Nam province	Law & political science	Kinh	Male	
Hoàng Kỳ	Old	Not	1946	—	Nam Định province	—	Kinh	Male	
Vũ Ngọc Kỳ	Old	Not	1946	—	Yên Bái province	—	Kinh	Male	
Phạm Văn Long	New	Not	1946	—	Hà Tĩnh province	Military science	Kinh	Male	
Nguyễn Hữu Luật	New	Not	1947	—	Quảng Ngãi province	Political science	Kinh	Male	
Trần Đức Lương	Old	Not	1937	1961	Quảng Ngãi province	Geological engineering	Kinh	Male	
Uông Chu Lưu	New	Reelected	1955	1983	Hà Tĩnh province	Law	Kinh	Male	
Hồ Xuân Mãn	New	Reelected	1949	—	Thừa Thiên Huế province	—	Kinh	Male	
Nông Đức Mạnh	New	Reelected	1940	1963	Bắc Kạn Province	Economics & carpentry	Tày	Male	
Vũ Mão	Old	Not	1939	—	Nam Định province	Agricultural engineering & economics	Kinh	Male	
Đặng Vũ Minh	Old	Reelected	1946	—	Nam Định province	—	Kinh	Male	
Nguyễn Ánh Minh	Old	Not	1945	—	Quảng Ngãi province	—	Kinh	Male	
Nguyễn Tuấn Minh	New	Reelected	1953	—	Bà Rịa–Vũng Tàu province	Finance	Kinh	Male	
Đỗ Hoài Nam	Old	Reelected	1949	—	Bắc Ninh province	—	Kinh	Male	
Mai Văn Năm	Old	Reelected	1948	—	Đà Nẵng City	—	Kinh	Male	
Nguyễn Thị Kim Ngân	New	Reelected	1954	1981	Bến Tre province	Economics & state budget finance	Kinh	Female	
Hồ Tiến Nghị	Old	Not	1940	—	Bắc Ninh province	Journalism	Kinh	Male	
Phạm Quang Nghị	Old	Reelected	1949	1973	Thanh Hóa province	Philosophy & history	Kinh	Male	
Lê Hữu Nghĩa	New	Reelected	1947	—	Quảng Ngãi province	—	Kinh	Male	
Hoàng Văn Nghiên	Old	Not	1941	—	Nam Định province	Electronics	Kinh	Male	
Nguyễn Khắc Nghiên	New	Reelected	1951	1972	Phú Thọ province	Military science	Kinh	Male	
Lê Huy Ngọ	Old	Not	1938	—	Thanh Hoá province	Agricultural engineering	Kinh	Male	
Tạ Quang Ngọc	Old	Not	1944	—	Nghệ An province	—	Kinh	Male	
Nguyễn Dy Niên	Old	Not	1935	—	Thanh Hoá province	Arts	Kinh	Male	
Tráng A Pao	Old	Not	1945	—	Lào Cai province	Economics	Hmong	Male	
Nguyễn Tấn Phát	Old	Not	1944	—	Tiền Giang province	Pedagogy	Kinh	Male	
Hoàng Văn Phong	New	Reelected	1948	—	Hà Nội City	—	Kinh	Male	
Tòng Thị Phóng	Old	Reelected	1954	1981	Sơn La province	Law	Thái	Female	
Phạm Đình Phú	New	Not	1948	—	Hưng Yên province	Finance	Kinh	Male	
Phùng Hữu Phú	New	Reelected	1948	—	Nam Định province	—	Kinh	Male	
Giàng Seo Phử	New	Reelected	1951	1978	Lào Cai province	Economics	Kinh	Male	
Võ Hồng Phúc	Old	Reelected	1945	1976	Hà Tĩnh province	Engineering economics	Kinh	Male	
Ksor Phước	Old	Reelected	1954	—	Gia Lai province	—	Kinh	Male	
Đỗ Nguyên Phương	Old	Not	1937	—	Hà Nội City	—	Kinh	Male	
Hoàng Bình Quân	New	Reelected	1959	1984	Thái Bình province	Foreign languages	Kinh	Male	
Lê Hoàng Quân	New	Reelected	1953	—	Bình Dương province	Political science	Kinh	Male	
Nguyễn Hồng Quân	New	Reelected	1949	1982	Hải Dương province	Hydropower engineering	Kinh	Male	
Nguyễn Văn Quân	Old	Not	1949	—	Vĩnh Long province	—	Kinh	Male	
Nguyễn Tấn Quyên	New	Reelected	1953	1969	Trà Vinh province	Arts & philology	Kinh	Male	
Trịnh Trọng Quyền	New	Not	1947	—	Thanh Hóa province	—	Kinh	Male	
Nguyễn Văn Rinh	Old	Not	1942	1963	Hải Dương province	Military & political science	Kinh	Male	
Tô Huy Rứa	Old	Reelected	1947	1967	Thanh Hóa province	Philosophy	Kinh	Male	
Trương Tấn Sang	Old	Reelected	1949	1969	Long An province	Law	Kinh	Male	
Nguyễn Văn Son	Old	Reelected	1946	1966	Hưng Yên province	Arts	Kinh	Male	
Khuất Hữu Sơn	New	Not	1945	—	Hà Tây province	Agricultural science	Kinh	Male	
Sơn Song Sơn	New	Reelected	1946	—	Trà Vinh province	Political science	Khmer	Male	
Đỗ Trung Tá	Old	Not	1945	—	Hà Nội City	Telecommunication	Kinh	Male	
Lê Thanh Tâm	New	Not	1946	—	Long An province	—	Kinh	Male	
Dương Mạc Thăng	New	Not	1946	—	Cao Bằng province	Agricultural engineering	Tày	Male	
Võ Thị Thắng	Old	Not	1945	—	Long An province	History & law	Kinh	Female	
Lê Bình Thanh	New	Not	1947	—	Thái Bình province	—	Kinh	Male	
Nguyễn Phúc Thanh	Old	Not	1944	—	Hà Tây province	Military science	Kinh	Male	
Phùng Quang Thanh	New	Reelected	1949	1968	Hà Nội City	Military science	Kinh	Male	
Quách Lê Thanh	New	Not	1947	—	Thanh Hoá province	Economics	Mường	Male	
Tạ Hữu Thanh	Old	Not	1942	—	Phú Thọ province	Banking	Kinh	Male	
Nguyễn Thế Thảo	New	Reelected	1952	1980	Bắc Ninh province	Economic management & architecture	Kinh	Male	
Đào Trọng Thi	Old	Reelected	1951	—	Hải Phòng City	—	Kinh	Male	
Phạm Văn Thọ	Old	Reelected	1945	—	Hải Dương province	—	Kinh	Male	
Nguyễn Thị Hoài Thu	Old	Not	1943	—	Tiền Giang province	Political science	Kinh	Female	
Niê Thuật	New	Reelected	1956	1981	Đắk Lắk province	Military science	Êđê	Male	
Lê Đức Thúy	New	Reelected	1948	—	Hà Tĩnh province	—	Kinh	Male	
Lê Thế Tiệm	Old	Reelected	1949	—	Quảng Nam province	—	Kinh	Male	
Bùi Sỹ Tiếu	New	Not	1947	—	Thái Bình province	—	Kinh	Male	
Nguyễn Văn Tình	New	Not	1945	—	Nam Định province	—	Kinh	Male	
Ma Thanh Toàn	Old	Not	1944	—	Cao Bằng province	—	Kinh	Male	
Nguyễn Khánh Toàn	Old	Reelected	1945	—	Quảng Trị province	Law	Kinh	Male	
Phạm Văn Trà	Old	Not	1935	—	Bắc Ninh province	Military science	Kinh	Male	
Hà Mạnh Trí	Old	Not	1942	—	Thái Bình province	Law	Kinh	Male	
Nguyễn Thế Trị	Old	Not	1940	—	Hải Dương province	—	Kinh	Male	
Nguyễn Minh Triết	Old	Reelected	1942	1965	Bình Dương province	Mathematics & political science	Kinh	Male	
Nguyễn Đức Triều	Old	Not	1942	—	Thái Bình province	Economics	Kinh	Male	
Nguyễn Phú Trọng	Old	Reelected	1944	1968	Hà Nội City	Political science & philology	Kinh	Male	
Trương Vĩnh Trọng	Old	Reelected	1942	—	Bến Tre province	Literature & economic management	Kinh	Male	
Mai Ái Trực	New	Not	1946	—	Bình Định province	—	Kinh	Male	
Đỗ Quang Trung	Old	Not	1946	—	Hà Nội City	—	Kinh	Male	
Mai Thế Trung	New	Reelected	1954	1974	Bình Dương province	Economics	Kinh	Male	
Trần Văn Truyền	New	Reelected	1950	1968	Bến Tre province	Law	Kinh	Male	
Nguyễn Văn Tự	Old	Reelected	1949	—	Khánh Hòa province	—	Kinh	Male	
Trần Văn Tuấn	Old	Reelected	1950	1974	Hải Dương province	Economics & mechanical engineering	Kinh	Male	
Phạm Minh Tuyên	New	Reelected	1949	1968	Ninh Bình province	Medicine & law	Kinh	Male	
Trương Đình Tuyển	Old	Not	1942	—	Nghệ An province	Machine building engineering	Kinh	Male	
Y Vêng	New	Reelected	1950	1968	Kon Tum province	—	Xê-đăng	Female	
Hồ Đức Việt	Old	Reelected	1947	1967	Nghệ An province	Mathematics & physics	Kinh	Male	
Lâm Chí Việt	New	Not	1950	—	Cần Thơ province	—	Kinh	Male	
Hồng Vinh	Old	Not	1945	—	Nam Định province	—	Kinh	Male	
Nguyễn Văn Yểu	Old	Not	1942	—	Hưng Yên province	Law	Kinh	Male	

== Bibliography ==
- Koh, David (2008). "Leadership Changes at the 10th Congress of the Vietnamese Communist Party". Asian Survey. 48 (4). University of California Press: 650–672. doi:10.1525/as.2008.48.4.650. JSTOR 10.1525/as.2008.48.4.650.
- Thayer, Carlyle (January 2002). "Vietnam in 2001: The Ninth Party Congress and After". Asian Survey. 42 (1). University of California Press: 81–89. doi:10.1525/as.2002.42.1.81. JSTOR 10.1525/as.2002.42.1.81.
- Thayer, Carlyle (2003). "Vietnam: The Stewardship of Nong Duc Manh". Southeast Asian Affairs. 2003. ISEAS–Yusof Ishak Institute: 311–326. JSTOR 27913241. S2CID 154958835.
