= 10th National Congress of the Communist Party of Vietnam =

Election of top leadership of Communist Party of Vietnam

- The flag of the Communist Party of Vietnam
- Date: 18–25 April 2006 (8 days)
- Location: Ba Đình Hall
- Participants: 1,176 delegates (which includes the members of the 9th Central Committee)
- Outcome: The election of the 10th Central Committee

The 10th National Congress of the Communist Party of Vietnam (Vietnamese: Đại hội Đảng Cộng sản Việt Nam lần thứ X) was held in Ba Đình Hall, Hanoi from 18 to 25 April 2006. The congress occurs every five years. 1,176 delegates represented the party's 3 million members. At the 13th plenum of the Central Committee, held before the congress, it was decided that eight members of the Communist Party's 9th Politburo had to retire. While certain segments within and outside the Politburo were skeptical, the decision was implemented. Because of party rules, the congress was not empowered to elect the general secretary, and it held a survey on whom the delegates wanted to be appointed General Secretary. The first plenum of the Central Committee, held in the immediate aftermath of the congress, re-elected Nông Đức Mạnh as general secretary.

The congress is noteworthy because of the extent of democratization which took place within the party. The role of the Central Committee in decision-making was strengthened, and the role of the Politburo as a supreme organ was weakened. Inner-party accountability was strengthened. The Eighth Five-Year Plan of the Socialist Republic of Vietnam was approved at the congress, renewed its Marxist–Leninist credentials and emphasized the need to continue to improve the socialist-oriented market economy.

== Preparations ==
Preparations for the 10th Congress were led by the Personnel Appointments subcommittee of the 9th Central Committee, probably chaired by General Secretary Nông Đức Mạnh. Mạnh worked closely with the Head of the Commission for Organization and Personnel to prepare a list of nominees for the election of the Central Committee at the upcoming congress. The 12th plenum of the 9th Central Committee, held in July 2005, laid down the principles for the Personnel Appointments subcommittee to work within:

- (i) quality of candidates in terms of qualifications and a "clean" CV
- (ii) reasonable distribution of candidates among different sectors and representations from among the population to ensure total Party leadership in all areas.

After the 12th plenum, the Personnel Appointments subcommittee began discussions with important organizations and individuals within the Party, most notably with the Central Commission for Inspection (which investigates complaints against Party members), party elders Đỗ Mười, Lê Đức Anh, Võ Văn Kiệt, Võ Nguyên Giáp and Nguyễn Đức Tâm, and with the 9th Politburo. The nomination list created in these discussions had to be voted on by the 9th Central Committee. At its 13th plenum, the 9th Central Committee, several changes to the nomination list recommended by Personnel Appointments subcommittee were made; the Central Committee decided to retire 8 out of 14 Politburo members, (Note: The eight members who were forced to retire, or retired voluntarily, were Nguyễn Văn An (Chairman of the National Assembly), Phan Văn Khải (Prime Minister), Trần Đức Lương (President), Phạm Văn Trà (Minister of Defence), Nguyễn Khoa Điềm (Head of the Commission for Ideology), Trương Quang Được (Head of the Commission for Mass Mobilization), Phan Diễn (Standing Secretary of the Secretariat) and Trần Đình Hoan (Head of the Commission for Organization and Personnel)) the largest number of en masse retirements in the history of the Politburo. However, in official pronouncements, this decision was referred to as a "survey", and not an election. Even so, the majority believed the eight people mentioned would retire rather than stay for another term. The retirements of Chairman of the National Assembly Nguyễn Văn An, who was considered a strong contender for the general secretaryship at the 11th Congress, and two leading proteges of Mạnh; the unofficial deputy general secretary Phan Diễn, and the Head of the Commission for Organization and Personnel Trần Đình Hoan, were unexpected.

Some party elders were seeking the removal of Mạnh as general secretary. While Đỗ Mười and Lê Đức Anh supported Mạnh's re-election, Võ Văn Kiệt and Võ Nguyên Giáp opposed him. However, all four of them agreed on retaining Nguyễn Văn An in the 10th Politburo. One point in Mạnh's favour was his lack of grave mistakes during his first tenure, and the lack of a credible opponent. Võ Văn Kiệt supported Nguyễn Minh Triết's candidacy for the general secretaryship, while the retiring prime minister Phan Văn Khải supported a possible candidacy by Nguyễn Văn An, even if the Central Committee had voted for his Politburo retirement in the "survey". Those who supported Mạnh's removal based their campaign on the fact that his son-in-law had worked at PMU 18 Department of the Ministry of Transport during the PMU 18 scandal. A more damaging rumour was that Mạnh had included Nguyễn Việt Tiến, the Deputy Minister of Transport who was implicated in the scandal, on the Central Committee nominee list.Also, Dao Đào Đình Bình, the Minister of Transport, was a close associate of Mạnh. Mạnh was accused of nepotism and of establishing a patronage system for himself within the party and state; his son Nông Quốc Tuấn was elected as Head of Youth Organizations in March 2005, and was thus entitled to attend the 10th Congress. At a meeting with some veteran politicians, Mạnh was asked by Lê Khả Phiêu and Võ Nguyên Giáp to resign from his post and not to run for a seat in the 10th Central Committee – Mạnh, however, refused to resign.

In a proposal to the 11th plenum of the 9th Central Committee, Võ Văn Kiệt suggested democratizing the political system by giving the delegates to a party congress the power to elect the general secretary, the Central Committee and the Central Commission for Inspection, and giving congress delegates ultimate power on all matters put before them at the congress. He called for the reduction of the Central Committee from one-fourth to one-third, holding the elections of state leaders at the National Assembly in the immediate aftermath of a congress (and not a year later), secret ballots for elections, empowering delegates to self-nominate to the Central Committee and merging the offices of President and General Secretary into one. These suggestions, with the exception of holding the National Assembly elections earlier, were rejected at the 11th plenum of the 9th Central Committee in January 2005.

At the 14th plenum of the 9th Central Committee, the Politburo proposed that Mạnh would be appointed president and resign from his post as general secretary to be succeeded by Nguyễn Văn An, while Phan Diễn would be retained for the sake of stability. The proposal was rejected in a formal vote by the 9th plenum, and the Central Committee upheld the results of the "survey". At the unplanned 15th plenum held 14–16 April, which was held due to pressure by Nguyễn Minh Triết, Nguyễn Văn An and Phan Văn Khải, it was decided that delegates at the upcoming congress had the right of self-nomination and that there would competing elections for the posts of general secretary, prime minister and chairman of the National Assembly. The loser of the contest for general secretary would be appointed president. Mạnh and Nguyễn Minh Triết were candidates for the general secretaryship, Nguyễn Tấn Dũng and Nguyễn Sinh Hùng for the prime ministership and Nguyễn Phú Trọng and Trương Tấn Sang for the National Assembly chairmanship. For the first time in the party's history, competing elections were held for offices of power.

== Delegates ==
1,176 delegates participated at the 10th Congress. These candidates were accepted on the basis of the Working Regulations of the party. 146 (12.37 percent) of the delegates were members of the 9th Central Committee. 1,025 (86.87 percent) of the delegates were elected by provincial and local subunits of the party. 9 (0.76 percent) of the delegates represented the party's overseas branches. 136 (11.56 percent) delegates were women, and 154 (13.10 percent) came from ethnic minorities. There were 18 (1.53 percent) delegates who had been awarded the Hero of the People's Armed Forces, 7 (0.60 percent) who had been awarded Hero of Labor, 4 (0.34 percent) who had been awarded the title People's Teacher, 13 (1.11 percent) who had been given the title Meritorious Teacher, 4 (0.34 percent) with the title of Meritorious Doctor, 27 (2.30 percent) with the honorary title 40 years of Party membership, 2 (0.17 percent) with the honorary title of 50 years of Party membership. 81.29 percent of the delegates had graduated from either college or university, and 16.59 percent of these had received PhD or had worked as professors or assistant professors. 96.52 percent of the delegates had received a bachelor's degree in political training courses. The average age of the delegates was 52.92 years – Dinh Huy (30 years of age) was the youngest delegate, and Do Quang Hung (77 years of age) was the oldest delegate.

== The Congress and the 1st plenum ==
The elected 10th Central Committee comprised 81 (52.5 percent) members from the 9th Central Committee, and 79 (47.5 percent) new members were elected. The candidate with the highest vote received 97.88 percent, while the candidate with the lowest vote received 63.41 percent. All the provinces, with the exception of Đắk Nông Province, elected officials to the 10th Central Committee. A number of surprises occurred during the election process; six ministers were not re-elected. (Note: The ministers who failed to get reelected were as follows; Đô ̃Quang Trung (Minister of the Interior), Nguyễn Minh Hien (Minister of Education and Training), Trần Thị Trung Chiến (Minister of Health), Đỗ Trung Tá (Minister of Post and Telecommunications), Tạ Quang Ngọc (Minister of Fisheries) and Đỗ Trung Tá (Inspector-General of the Government). Of these, the biggest surprise was Đô ̃ Quang Trung, the planned successor to Politburo member Trần Đình Hoan.) Another surprise was that no officials from the Ministry of Foreign Affairs were elected as full members. However, Phạm Bình Minh, the Director of the International Organizations Directorate of the Ministry of Foreign Affairs, was elected as an alternate member. None of the 34 self-nominated candidates at the congress were elected to the 10th Central Committee. It is unknown whether any of the self-nominees for alternate membership in the 10th Central Committee were elected. There was an increase in Central Committee officials working in the central government, the provinces, military and defence officials, public security officials and officials from mass organizations, but there was a decrease in officials from the sectors of information, social and cultural affairs, economics, business and financial affairs, and others.

As the meeting progressed, some delegates publicly demanded that the congress should be given the authority to elect the general secretary and the head of the Central Commission for Inspection. This was approved and a survey form which listed four possible candidates; Mạnh, Nguyễn Minh Triết, Nguyễn Văn An and Nguyễn Phú Trọng was created. Nguyễn Văn An withdrew his candidacy, knowing he would not be elected to the 10th Politburo because he was not elected to the 10th Central Committee. However, because of party rules which stated that the Central Committee after the congress elected the general secretary, the vote at the congress was considered a survey. Another version of the proceedings, that given by Mạnh at the press conference after the congress, was that the 1,176 congress delegates were given a list of the elected members of the 10th Central Committee, and were given a free choice of electing any of them to the general secretaryship. After the congress, on 25 April, the 1st plenum of the Central Committee convened to elect the general secretary. The two leading candidates at the congress survey, Mạnh and Nguyễn Minh Triết, stood for election at the plenum. Mạnh was elected and Nguyễn Minh Triết was appointed state president. However, rumours that Mạnh won narrowly over his rival, and that Nguyễn Minh Triết withdrew his candidature following the party tradition of appointing the general secretary, circulated after the congress.

The 10th Politburo comprised 14 members. As was decided at the first plenum, the ranking given to Politburo members was to be decided by the number of approval votes the official earned during the election. Lê Hồng Anh, the Minister of Public Security, was ranked second in the Politburo because he received the second-most approval votes for his candidacy. Of the 14 members of the Politburo, five were concurrently members of the 10th Secretariat. The Secretariat comprised eight members, amongst whom the highest rank was general secretary.

== Policy enactments ==
The official Congress communique set 2020 as a date on which Vietnam would reach the status of a modern, industrial society. To reach this goal, the targeted growth for gross domestic product (GDP) was set at 7.5–8 percent for 2006–2011. The congress promised to renew the socialist-oriented market economy, and step up its fight against political corruption. The communique emphasized the party's goal of a future society without exploitation, based on the ideology of Marxism–Leninism. The Political Report, the Eighth Five-Year Plan (2006–2010) – officially titled the Five Year Socio-economic Development Plan, the report on Party building and the amendment and revision to the Party's charter, were approved. Mạnh said that the approval of these documents were "the results of the intellect and the will of our entire Party and people, the in-depth practical and theoretical summation of 20 years of Renovation [Đổi Mới] and the improvement and development of the policy and philosophy of renovations in the current period of our country's revolution."

The Eighth Five-Year Plan is subordinate to the Ten Year Socio-economic Development Strategy (2001–2010) which aims to continue comprehensive reform and achieve fast, sustainable growth rates. The main goal of the Ten Year Plan is to lift Vietnam out of the category of underdeveloped countries and to reach the status of a modern-industrial nation by 2012. The Eighth Five-Year Plan, while approved by the Congress, had to earn the approval of the National Assembly before being implemented.

The delegates approved the general secretary's Political Report, Report on Orientations and Tasks for Socio-Economic Development for the 2006–10 Period, and the Report on Party building and amendments made to the party statute. These reports' main objectives were to accelerate the reform process and strengthen the socialist-oriented market economy. The congress allowed existing party members to engage in private ownership. This was a controversial amendment and was a break with the theory of exploitation of man by man. While the amendment was approved, the third plenum of the 10th Central Committee restricted the change to party members who had worked in state-owned enterprises which have been privatized.

== Democratization ==
An important characteristic of the 10th Congress was the internal democratization of the party leadership, most notably seen in the Politburo's willingness to follow the "survey" voted by the 13th plenum of the Central Committee. The top five members of the "survey" were rewarded with the five highest government positions in Vietnam. While the leadership selection process was not dramatically altered, the Central Committee as a collective unit was strengthened, and the Central Committee acquired control over personnel appointments and policy-making. In effect, these changes have reduced the roles of powerful individuals, who may be seen as taking too much control.

== Acknowledgement ==
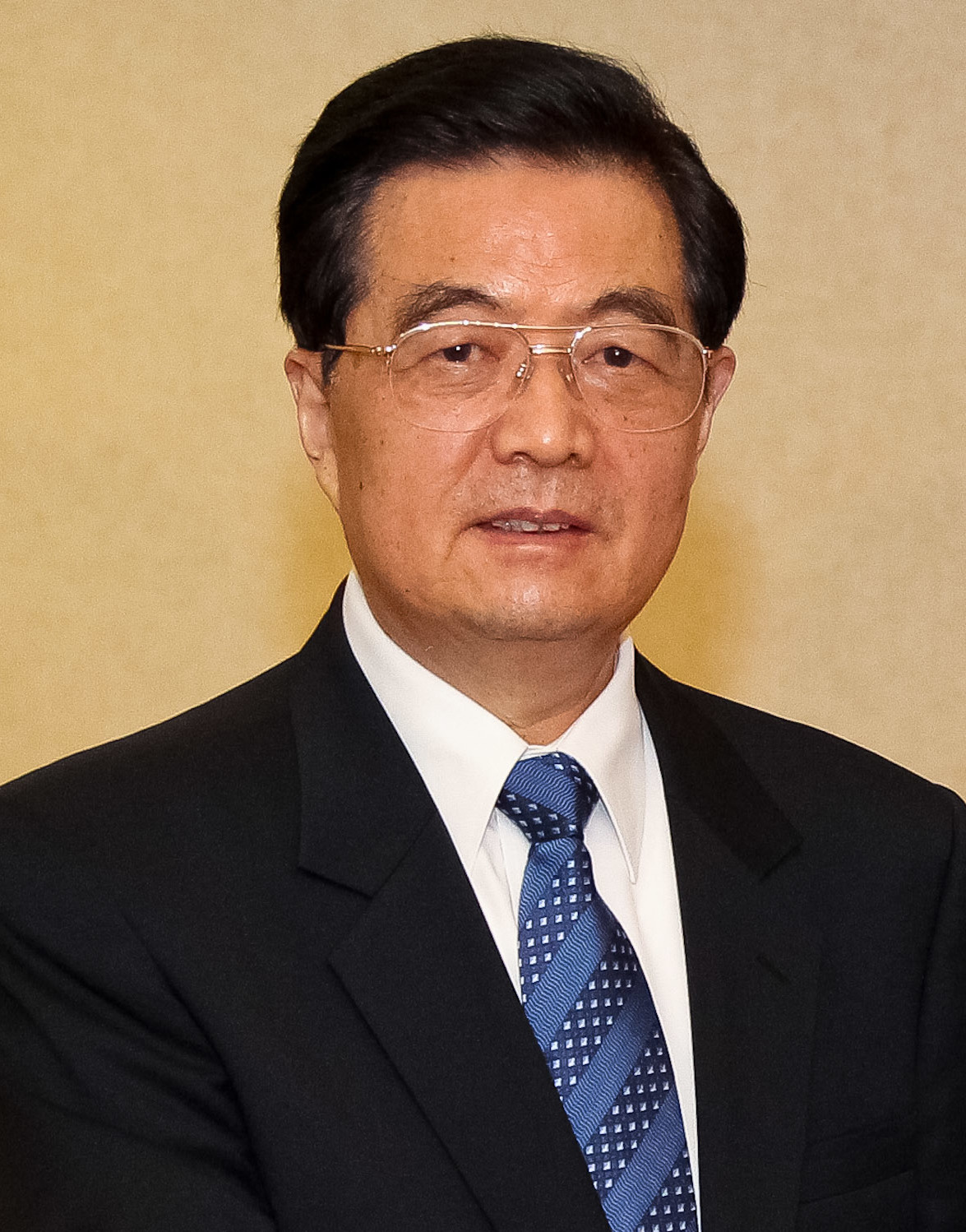
Hu Jintao, the CCP General Secretary, personally congratulated Nguyen Van Son on the holding of the 10th National Congress

35 foreign parties congratulated the CPV on holding its 10th Congress. Among these were ruling parties of the remaining socialist states, the Communist Party of Cuba, the Chinese Communist Party (CCP) and the Lao People's Revolutionary Party. Hu Jintao, the former CCP General Secretary, personally congratulated Nguyen Van Son, the Chairman of the CPV Commission for External Relations, on the CPV's holding of the 10th National Congress. Not all the parties which congratulated the CPV were communists, for example the Cambodian People's Party, the Social Democratic Party of Germany, the Uri Party and the Bulgarian Socialist Party.

The French Communist Party congratulated the CPV on holding its 10th National Congress, and stated that it "was a milestone and an occasion for the Party to reiterate its orientations and its determination to implement objectives as well as open new visions for the 21st century." In an official communique from the Central Committee of the Japanese Communist Party (JCP) to the CPV 10th Central Committee, the JPC Central Committee stated "The Communist Party of Viet Nam is advancing on the chosen path of building socialism through the market economy. This is a new discovery in the history of mankind." The Communist Party of India sent its "warmest fraternal greetings to the leadership and delegates to the 10th Congress of the Communist Party of Viet Nam." The Communist Party USA sent a "warm revolutionary greetings to the delegates and members of the Communist Party of Viet Nam on the occasion of your 10th National Party Congress. We wish you much success in your deliberations at this important event." The Communist Party of the Russian Federation stated, "Under the leadership of the Communist Party of Viet Nam, the Socialist Republic of Viet Nam has successfully carried out adopted policies. The industrious Vietnamese people have created favourable conditions for progress. The CPV has displayed a creative and principled approach to solving important and sophisticated problems, while remaining persistent in its socialist ideology."

The Portuguese Communist Party said, "The Tenth Party Congress and the objectives your congress was striving towards, given the present international situation, constitute something significant." The Communist Party of Brazil said, "We are very impressed by the efforts exerted by the Vietnamese people and Communists in building socialism in line with national development. The renewal process in Viet Nam has helped the country attain great achievements in modernization, industrialization and international integration." Mahmoud Abbas, Chairman of the Executive Committee of the Palestine Liberation Organization extended his greetings, and said "We are proud of our friendship and relationship, and once again reaffirm our determination to strengthen ties and solidarity for the mutual benefit of both our nations".

== Bibliography ==
- Koh, David (July–August 2008). "Leadership Changes at the 10th Congress of the Vietnamese Communist Party". Asian Survey. 48 (4). University of California Press: 650–672. doi:10.1525/as.2008.48.4.650. JSTOR 10.1525/as.2008.48.4.650.
- Luong, Hy V. (January–February 2007). "Vietnam in 2006: Stronger Global Integration and Resolve for Better Governance". Asian Survey. 47 (1). University of California Press: 168–174. doi:10.1525/as.2007.47.1.168. JSTOR 10.1525/as.2007.47.1.168.
- Thayer, Carlyle (2007). "Vietnam: The Tenth Party Congress and After". Southeast Asian Affairs. 2007 (1) SEAA07S. Institute of Southeast Asian Studies: 379–397. doi:10.1355/SEAA07S (inactive 1 July 2025). S2CID 154909701.
