= Permanent Member of the Communist Party of Vietnam Central Committee's Secretariat =

Communist Party of Vietnam position

Permanent Member of the Party Central Committee's Secretariat
- Emblem of the Communist Party of Vietnam

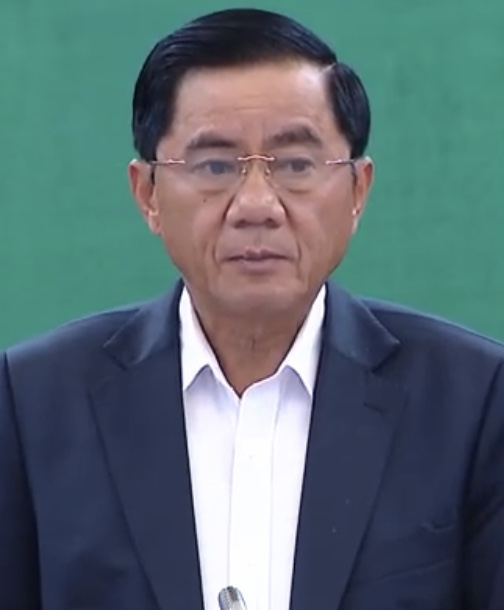
- Incumbent; Trần Cẩm Tú since 25 October 2024
- Secretariat of the Communist Party of Vietnam
- Style: Comrade
- Type: Permanent secretary
- Status: Fifth highest ranking official
- Member of: Central Committee, Political Bureau and the Secretariat
- Reports to: Central Committee
- Seat: Headquarters of the Party Central Committee; 1 Hùng Vương Street, Ba Đình district, Hà Nội
- Appointer: Political Bureau
- Term length: Five years, renewable
- Constituting instrument: Charter of the Communist Party of Vietnam
- Inaugural holder: Nguyễn Duy Trinh
- Formation: 49 years and 304 days
- Unofficial names: Standing Member; Executive Secretary
- Website: Homepage

The Permanent Member of the Communist Party of Vietnam Central Committee's Secretariat (Vietnamese: Thường trực Ban Bí thư Trung ương Đảng Cộng sản Việt Nam), informally the Permanent Member (Note: or alternately, Standing Member) of the Secretariat, (Note: also referred to as Executive Secretary of the Communist Party of Vietnam by foreign media) is a senior position within the Communist Party of Vietnam.

The Permanent Member is appointed by the Politburo, and is responsible for the management of directives and day-to-day work of the Secretariat. A member of both the Politburo and the Secretariat, the officeholder is often considered the fifth most powerful figure in Vietnam's political system — immediately behind the General Secretary of the Central Committee, the President, the Prime Minister and the Chair of the National Assembly.

The current officeholder is Trần Cẩm Tú, who was appointed by a decision of the 13th Politburo on 25 October 2024 to replace Lương Cường, who was appointed as President of Vietnam, succeeding General Secretary Tô Lâm.

== History ==
The office was established at the Party's 4th National Congress.

During the tenure of the 8th Central Committee (1996–2001), the Secretariat was replaced by the Politburo Standing Committee, thus, the office was known as Permanent Member of the Politburo Standing Committee.

== Selection process ==
=== Political qualifications ===
A Permanent Member of the Secretariat has to be a Central Committee member. To be elected to the Central Committee, one must show absolute loyalty to the Party’s interests, the nation and the people. Moreover, a Central Committee member must steadfastly commit to Marxism-Leninism, Ho Chi Minh Thought, national independence, socialism and the Party’s line. The Permanent Member must have an unwavering political stance and show political bravery. Therefore, the individual must resolutely protect the Party's ideology, the Party's Platform, the Party's line, the Constitution and the State's laws and combat erroneous views. Moreover, they must be patriotic, always put the interests of the Party, nation and the people above their personal interests, and be willing to sacrifice themself for the Party’s revolutionary cause, national independence and the people’s happiness.

As a Central Committee member, a Permanent Member must have exemplary ethics and live a good lifestyle. The 214-QD/TW regulations state that the Permanent Member has to have exemplary moral qualities such as living honestly, humbly, sincerely, purely, simply, tolerantly, and being thrift, having a high sense of integrity, fairness and impartiality. Furthermore, the regulation stresses that the officeholder must not have ambition for power, while stressing the need for enthusiasm and a high sense of responsibility for work. A Permanent Member cannot be corrupt, seek opportunities for personal profiteering and must resolutely combat, prevent and repel deterioration of political ideology, morality, lifestyle, manifestations of self-evolution, self-transformation, bureaucracy, corruption, negativity, waste, rights and group interests in the party-state. More specifically, the Permanent Member cannot let relatives and acquaintances take advantage of their positions and powers for profit. A Permanent Member must strictly implement the Party's organisational and disciplinary principles, especially the principles of democratic centralism and criticism and self-criticism. It is expected that the officeholder properly exercises their powers and responsibilities and direct the strict implementation of principles, regulations and procedures on cadre work as well as resolutely struggling against manifestations and deeds contrary to the regulations of the Party and the State in cadre work.

=== Work qualifications ===
Since every Permanent Member has also served concurrently in the Politburo, the party regulation 214-QD/TW of 2020 states explicitly that one must have served a full term in this body before the appointment. To guarantee a successful selection process and that the candidate possesses the appropriate qualifications, it is essential for the Permanent Member to possess the following traits and abilities: a high standing, a core of unity in the Central Committee, the Politburo, the Secretariat, and throughout the Party. Possess a strong degree of political acumen, broad knowledge and expertise in party building and political system construction. The Permanent Member is also expected to be well-informed about politics, economics, culture, society, defence, security and international relations. Understanding of politics, decision-making abilities in management, and the capability to coordinate the staff and agencies of the Party Central Committee, Fatherland Front, and socio-political organisations efficiently and harmoniously are all critical qualifications. Finally, the Permanent Member is expected to have former experience as a secretary of provincial and city committees or as a leader of central commissions, ministries, and branches.

According to party regulation 214-QD/TW, a Permanent Member should possess the following qualities: objectiveness, comprehensiveness, dialectical perspective, an understanding of history, innovative thinking, and strategic vision. Science-based working methods, political acumen, and the capability to lead, direct, and organise the effective implementation of Party policies and guidelines, as well as the laws of the State, are crucial for the officeholder. In addition, she or he must be capable of summarising practice, theoretical research, analysis, and forecasting. A Permanent Member must have an in-depth knowledge of the general situation, the fields, localities, agencies and units assigned to manage and take charge of them. As well as identifying contradictions, challenges, new problems, complex problems, limitations, and weaknesses in practice, the officeholder must also proactively propose feasible and effective tasks and solutions. An ideal candidate should be dynamic, creative, hardworking, industrious, daring to think, act, assume responsibility, do things decisively, and be open to experiencing difficulties. As a result, the permanent member must base his work on the premise that sayings go hand-in-hand with actions. A candidate must have outstanding achievements, have specific results and have made an essential contribution to promoting the development of industries, localities, agencies and units. Moreover, the candidate must be willing to work on issues that are important to the people and be willing to serve the people wholeheartedly. Last, as a Permanent Member, one must be able to form the nucleus that gathers and promotes the synergy of the political system and, as such, must be highly trusted by fellow Party members and the masses.

In addition to these, regulation 214-QD/TW states that the candidate must have obtained a university degree or undergone a course at the party school, the Hồ Chí Minh National Academy of Politics and Public Administration. Experience in state management as a senior specialist or equivalent is also a positive, as well as speaking a foreign language and having basic computer skills. A candidate should also be healthy enough to perform his duties. The candidate must fit the age requirements set by Party's regulations. Furthermore, a candidate should have experience as a successful leader and key manager of direct subordinates before being appointed.

== Duties and responsibilities ==
In accordance with Clause 5 of Article 7 of Regulation 80-QD/TW dated 18 August 2022, the Permanent Member is responsible for assuming the prime responsibility for, alongside the Head of the Central Organisation Commission and the Chairman of the Central Inspection Commission, reviewing the election results and deciding on the approval of the newly-elected executive committees, standing committees, secretaries and deputy secretaries. In addition, it must review the election results for inspection commissions and those of provincial committees, city committees and party committees directly under the Central Committee. The Permanent Member can, as long as they are not in breach of the Party's Charter, appoint additional members of standing committees directly under the Central Committee. In addition, the Permanent Member can appoint members of party delegations. Furthermore, the Permanent Member can give opinions on the personnel of members of the Politburo and the Secretariat, the Vice President of Vietnam, deputy prime ministers and the vice chairs of the National Assembly. In accordance with Politburo and/or Secretariat decisions, the Permanent Member may re-appoint cadres under the Secretariat to manage the work of party committees, agencies, units, and social organisations directly under its jurisdiction. In the event that they are not eligible for reappointment, they must inform the relevant authorities.

== Officeholders ==
Permanent Members of the Party Central Committee's Secretariat
No.	Portrait	Name	Took office	Left office	Duration	Electoral term	BY	PM	Birthplace	Gender	Ref.
1		Nguyễn Duy Trinh	20 December 1976	31 March 1982	5 years and 101 days	4th CC (1976–1982)	1910	1930	Nghệ An province	Male	
2		Lê Đức Thọ	30 April 1980	31 March 1982	1 year and 335 days	4th CC (1976–1982)	1911	1930	Nam Định province	Male	
3		Lê Thanh Nghị	30 April 1980	31 March 1982	1 year and 335 days	4th CC (1976–1982)	1911	1930	Hải Dương province	Male	
4		Võ Chí Công	31 March 1982	21 June 1986	4 years and 82 days	5th CC (1982–1986)	1912	1935	Quảng Nam province	Male	
5		Nguyễn Văn Linh	21 June 1986	18 December 1986	180 days	5th CC (1982–1986)	1915	1936	Hưng Yên province	Male	
6		Đỗ Mười	18 December 1986	22 June 1988	1 year and 187 days	6th CC (1986–1991)	1917	1939	Hà Nội City	Male	
7		Nguyễn Thanh Bình	22 June 1988	27 June 1991	3 years and 5 days	6th CC (1986–1991)	1918	1939	Bắc Ninh province	Male	
8		Lê Đức Anh	27 June 1991	23 September 1992	1 year and 88 days	7th CC (1991–1996)	1920	1938	Thừa Thiên Huế province	Male	
9		Đào Duy Tùng	23 September 1992	1 July 1996	3 years and 282 days	7th CC (1991–1996)	1924	1945	Phúc Yên City	Male	
10		Lê Khả Phiêu	1 July 1996	16 December 1997	1 year and 168 days	8th CC (1996–2001)	1931	1949	Thanh Hóa province	Male	
11		Phạm Thế Duyệt	16 December 1997	22 April 2001	3 years and 127 days	8th CC (1996–2001)	1936	1965	Hải Dương province	Male	
12		Nguyễn Phú Trọng	26 August 1999	22 April 2001	1 year and 239 days	8th CC (1996–2001)	1944	1968	Hà Nội City	Male	
13		Trần Đình Hoan	22 April 2001	27 June 2001	66 days	9th CC (2001–2006)	1939	1962	Hưng Yên province	Male	
14		Phan Diễn	27 June 2001	24 April 2006	4 years and 301 days	9th CC (2001–2006)	1937	1962	Quảng Nam province	Male	
15		Trương Tấn Sang	24 April 2006	3 August 2011	5 years and 101 days	10th CC (2006–2011)	1949	1969	Long An province	Male	
16		Lê Hồng Anh	3 August 2011	4 February 2016	4 years and 185 days	11th CC (2011–2016)	1949	1968	Kiên Giang province	Male	
17		Đinh Thế Huynh	4 February 2016	2 March 2018	2 years and 26 days	12th CC (2016–2021)	1953	1974	Nam Định province	Male	
18		Trần Quốc Vượng	2 March 2018	5 February 2021	2 years and 340 days	12th CC (2016–2021)	1953	1979	Thái Bình province	Male	
19		Võ Văn Thưởng	5 February 2021	6 March 2023	2 years and 29 days	13th CC (2021–2026)	1970	1993	Vĩnh Long province	Male	
20		Trương Thị Mai	6 March 2023	16 May 2024	1 year and 71 days	13th CC (2021–2026)	1958	1985	Quảng Bình province	Female	
21		Lương Cường	16 May 2024	25 October 2024	162 days	13th CC (2021–2026)	1957	1978	Phú Thọ province	Male	
22		Trần Cẩm Tú	25 October 2024	Incumbent	1 year and 360 days	14th CC (2026–2031)	1961	1990	Hà Tĩnh province	Male	

== See also ==
- General Secretary of the Communist Party of Vietnam
- Secretariat of the Communist Party of Vietnam
- Central Committee of the Communist Party of Vietnam
