= Mai Dịch Cemetery =

Cemetery in Hanoi, Vietnam

- Interactive map of Mai Dịch Cemetery

Details
- Location: Hồ Tùng Mậu road, Phú Diễn ward, Hanoi
- Country: Vietnam
- Coordinates: 21°02′21″N 105°46′10″E
- Type: memorial

The Mai Dịch Cemetery (Vietnamese: Nghĩa trang Mai Dịch) is a cemetery in Hanoi, Vietnam, which houses the graves of Communist government leaders and famous revolutionaries.

== Burials ==
Notable burials include:

- Phùng Chí Kiên (died 1941)
- Nguyễn Sơn (d. 1956)
- Nguyễn Chí Thanh (d. 1967)
- Nguyễn Lương Bằng (d. 1979)
- Tôn Đức Thắng (d. 1980)
- Nguyễn Phan Chánh (d. 1984)
- Xuân Thủy (d. 1985)
- Xuân Diệu (d. 1985)
- Hoàng Văn Thái (d. 1986)
- Lê Duẩn (d. 1986)
- Trần Quốc Hoàn (d. 1986)
- Lê Trọng Tấn (d. 1986)
- Phạm Hùng (d. 1988)
- Phạm Huy Thông (d. 1988)
- Trường Chinh (d. 1988)
- Giáp Văn Cương (d. 1990)
- Lê Đức Thọ (d. 1990)
- Văn Cao (d. 1995)
- Nguyễn Khắc Viện (d. 1997)
- Nguyễn Cơ Thạch (d 1998)
- Đoàn Khuê (d. 1999)
- Lê Quang Đạo (d. 1999)
- Phạm Văn Đồng (d. 2000)
- Văn Tiến Dũng (d. 2002)
- Tố Hữu (d. 2002)
- Nguyễn Đình Thi (d. 2003)
- Trần Hoàn (d. 2003)
- Lê Minh Hương (d. 2004)
- Huy Cận (d. 2005)
- Vũ Kỳ (d. 2005)
- Huy Du (d. 2007)
- Trần Lâm (d. 2011)
- Hồ Đức Việt (d. 2013)
- Trần Văn Quang (d. 2013)
- Lê Khả Phiêu (d. 2020)
- Nguyễn Phú Trọng (d. 2024)
