= 10th Politburo of the Communist Party of Vietnam =

Politburo of Vietnam's Communist Party

The 10th Politburo of the Communist Party of Vietnam (CPV), formally the 10th Political Bureau of the Central Committee of the Communist Party of Vietnam (Vietnamese: Bộ Chính trị Ban Chấp hành trung ương Đảng Cộng sản Việt Nam Khoá X), was elected at the 1st Plenary Session of the 10th Central Committee in the immediate aftermath of the 10th National Congress.

== Members ==
Members of the 10th Politburo of the Communist Party of Vietnam
Rank	Name	9th POL		11th POL		Birth	PM	Birthplace	Education	Ethnicity	Gender	Ref.
Rank	Name	New	Rank	New	Rank	Birth	PM	Birthplace	Education	Ethnicity	Gender	Ref.
1	Nông Đức Mạnh	Old	1	Not	—	1940	1963	Bắc Kạn Province	Graduate	Tày	Male	
2	Lê Hồng Anh	Old	9	Reelected	6	1949	1968	Kiên Giang province	Undergraduate	Kinh	Male	
3	Nguyễn Tấn Dũng	Old	5	Reelected	4	1949	1967	Cà Mau province	Undergraduate	Kinh	Male	
4	Nguyễn Minh Triết	Old	4	Not	—	1942	1965	Bình Dương province	Undergraduate	Kinh	Male	
5	Trương Tấn Sang	Old	10	Reelected	2	1949	1969	Long An province	Undergraduate	Kinh	Male	
6	Nguyễn Phú Trọng	Old	10	Reelected	1	1944	1968	Hà Nội City	Graduate	Kinh	Male	
7	Phạm Gia Khiêm	New	—	Not	—	1944	1978	Hà Nội City	Graduate	Kinh	Male	
8	Phùng Quang Thanh	New	—	Reelected	3	1949	1968	Hà Nội City	Graduate	Kinh	Male	
9	Trương Vĩnh Trọng	New	—	Not	—	1942	—	Bến Tre province	Graduate	Kinh	Male	
10	Lê Thanh Hải	New	—	Reelected	7	1950	1968	Tiền Giang province	Undergraduate	Kinh	Male	
11	Nguyễn Sinh Hùng	New	—	Reelected	5	1946	1977	Nghệ An province	Graduate	Kinh	Male	
12	Phạm Quang Nghị	New	—	Reelected	9	1949	1973	Thanh Hóa province	Graduate	Kinh	Male	
13	Hồ Đức Việt	New	—	Not	—	1947	1967	Nghệ An province	Graduate	Kinh	Male	
14	Nguyễn Văn Chiền	New	—	Not	—	1949	1974	Hải Dương province	Undergraduate	Kinh	Male	
15	Tô Huy Rứa	By-election	—	Reelected	8	1947	1967	Thanh Hóa province	Graduate	Kinh	Male	

== Bibliography ==
- Chân dung 19 ủy viên Bộ Chính trị khóa XII
