= 8th Politburo of the Communist Party of Vietnam =

Politburo of Vietnam's Communist Party

The 8th Politburo of the Communist Party of Vietnam (CPV), formally the 8th Political Bureau of the Central Committee of the Communist Party of Vietnam (Vietnamese: Bộ Chính trị Ban Chấp hành trung ương Đảng Cộng sản Việt Nam Khoá VIII), was elected at the 1st Plenary Session of the 8th Central Committee in the immediate aftermath of the 8th National Congress.

== Members ==
=== 1st Plenary Session (1996–97) ===
Members of the 8th Politburo of the Communist Party of Vietnam
Rank	Name	7th POL		4th PLE		Birth	PM	Birthplace	Education	Ethnicity	Gender	Ref.
Rank	Name	New	Rank	New	Rank	Birth	PM	Birthplace	Education	Ethnicity	Gender	Ref.
1	Đỗ Mười	Old	1	Resigned	—	1917	1939	Hà Nội City	None	Kinh	Male	
2	Lê Đức Anh	Old	2	Resigned	—	1920	1938	Thừa Thiên Huế province	Military science	Kinh	Male	
3	Võ Văn Kiệt	Old	3	Resigned	—	1922	1939	Vĩnh Long province	None	Kinh	Male	
4	Nông Đức Mạnh	Old	10	Renewed	4	1940	1963	Bắc Kạn Province	Economics & carpentry	Tày	Male	
5	Lê Khả Phiêu	Old	14	Renewed	1	1931	1949	Thanh Hóa province	Military science	Kinh	Male	
6	Đoàn Khuê	Old	5	Renewed	6	1923	—	Quảng Trị province	Military science	Kinh	Male	
7	Phan Văn Khải	Old	8	Renewed	3	1933	1959	Hồ Chí Minh City	Economics	Kinh	Male	
8	Nguyễn Mạnh Cầm	Old	16	Renewed	7	1929	—	Nghệ An province	Russian studies	Kinh	Male	
9	Nguyễn Đức Bình	Old	12	Renewed	8	1927	1945	Hà Tĩnh province	Philosophy	Kinh	Male	
10	Nguyễn Văn An	New	—	Renewed	9	1937	1959	Nam Định province	Electrical engineering	Kinh	Male	
11	Phạm Văn Trà	New	—	Renewed	5	1935	—	Bắc Ninh province	Military science	Kinh	Male	
12	Trần Đức Lương	New	—	Renewed	2	1937	1961	Quảng Ngãi province	Geological engineering	Kinh	Male	
13	Nguyễn Thị Xuân Mỹ	New	—	Renewed	10	1940	—	Hải Dương province	Law & economics	Kinh	Female	
14	Trương Tấn Sang	New	—	Renewed	11	1949	1969	Long An province	Law	Kinh	Male	
15	Lê Xuân Tùng	New	—	Renewed	12	1936	—	Hà Tĩnh province	Economics	Kinh	Male	
16	Lê Minh Hương	New	—	Renewed	13	1936	—	Hà Tĩnh province	Military science	Kinh	Male	
17	Nguyễn Đình Tứ	New	—	Not	—	1932	—	Nghệ Tĩnh province	Mathematics & physics	Kinh	Male	
18	Phạm Thế Duyệt	New	—	Renewed	14	1936	—	Hải Dương province	Mining engineering & economic management	Kinh	Male	
19	Nguyễn Tấn Dũng	New	—	Renewed	15	1949	1967	Cà Mau province	Law	Kinh	Male	

=== 4th Plenary Session (1997–01) ===
Members of the 8th Politburo of the Communist Party of Vietnam
Rank	Name	4th PLE		9th POL		Birth	PM	Birthplace	Education	Ethnicity	Gender	Ref.
Rank	Name	New	Rank	New	Rank	Birth	PM	Birthplace	Education	Ethnicity	Gender	Ref.
1	Lê Khả Phiêu	Old	5	Not	—	1931	1949	Thanh Hóa province	Military science	Kinh	Male	
2	Trần Đức Lương	Old	12	Reelected	2	1937	1961	Quảng Ngãi province	Geological engineering	Kinh	Male	
3	Phan Văn Khải	Old	7	Reelected	3	1933	1959	Hồ Chí Minh City	Economics	Kinh	Male	
4	Nông Đức Mạnh	Old	4	Reelected	1	1940	1963	Bắc Kạn Province	Economics & carpentry	Tày	Male	
5	Phạm Văn Trà	Old	11	Reelected	11	1935	—	Bắc Ninh province	Military science	Kinh	Male	
6	Đoàn Khuê	Old	6	Not	—	1923	—	Quảng Trị province	Military science	Kinh	Male	
7	Nguyễn Mạnh Cầm	Old	8	Not	—	1929	—	Nghệ An province	Russian studies	Kinh	Male	
8	Nguyễn Đức Bình	Old	9	Not	—	1927	1945	Hà Tĩnh province	Philosophy	Kinh	Male	
9	Nguyễn Văn An	Old	10	Reelected	12	1937	1959	Nam Định province	Electrical engineering	Kinh	Male	
10	Nguyễn Thị Xuân Mỹ	Old	13	Not	—	1940	—	Hải Dương province	Law & economics	Kinh	Female	
11	Trương Tấn Sang	Old	14	Reelected	10	1949	1969	Long An province	Law	Kinh	Male	
12	Lê Xuân Tùng	Old	15	Not	—	1936	—	Hà Tĩnh province	Economics	Kinh	Male	
13	Lê Minh Hương	Old	16	Reelected	6	1936	—	Hà Tĩnh province	Military science	Kinh	Male	
14	Phạm Thế Duyệt	Old	18	Not	—	1936	—	Hải Dương province	Mining engineering & economic management	Kinh	Male	
15	Nguyễn Tấn Dũng	Old	19	Reelected	5	1949	1967	Cà Mau province	Law	Kinh	Male	
16	Phạm Thanh Ngân	New	—	Not	—	1939	1961	Thái Nguyên province	Military science	Kinh	Male	
17	Phan Diễn	New	—	Reelected	8	1937	1962	Quảng Nam province	—	Kinh	Male	
18	Nguyễn Minh Triết	New	—	Reelected	4	1942	1965	Bình Dương province	Mathematics & political science	Kinh	Male	
19	Nguyễn Phú Trọng	New	—	Reelected	7	1944	1968	Hà Nội City	Political science & philology	Kinh	Male	

== Bibliography ==
- Chân dung 19 ủy viên Bộ Chính trị khóa XII
