= 8th Politburo Standing Committee of the Communist Party of Vietnam =

Politburo of Vietnam's Communist Party

The 8th Politburo Standing Committee of the Communist Party of Vietnam (CPV), formally the 8th Standing Committee of the Political Bureau of the Central Committee of the Communist Party of Vietnam (Vietnamese: Thường vụ Bộ Chính trị Ban Chấp hành Trung ương Đảng Cộng sản Việt Nam Khoá VIII), was elected at the 1st Plenary Session of the 8th Central Committee in the immediate aftermath of the 8th National Congress.

== Members ==
=== 1st Plenary Session (1996–97) ===
Members of the 8th Politburo Standing Committee of the Communist Party of Vietnam
Rank	Name	7th SEC		4th PLE		Birth	PM	Birthplace	Education	Ethnicity	Gender	Portrait	Ref.
Rank	Name	New	Rank	New	Rank	Birth	PM	Birthplace	Education	Ethnicity	Gender	Portrait	Ref.
1	Đỗ Mười	Old	1	Resigned	—	1917	1939	Hà Nội City	None	Kinh	Male		
2	Lê Đức Anh	Old	2	Resigned	—	1920	1938	Thừa Thiên Huế province	Military science	Kinh	Male		
3	Võ Văn Kiệt	Old	3	Resigned	—	1922	1939	Vĩnh Long province	None	Kinh	Male		
4	Lê Khả Phiêu	Old	14	Renewed	1	1931	1949	Thanh Hóa province	Military science	Kinh	Male		
5	Nguyễn Tấn Dũng	New	—	Not	—	1949	1967	Cà Mau province	Law	Kinh	Male		

=== 4th Plenary Session (1997–01) ===
Members of the 8th Politburo Standing Committee of the Communist Party of Vietnam
Rank	Name	4th PLE		9th SEC		Birth	PM	Birthplace	Education	Ethnicity	Gender	Portrait	Ref.
Rank	Name	New	Rank	New	Rank	Birth	PM	Birthplace	Education	Ethnicity	Gender	Portrait	Ref.
1	Lê Khả Phiêu	Old	4	Not	—	1931	1949	Thanh Hóa province	Military science	Kinh	Male		
2	Trần Đức Lương	New	—	Not	—	1937	1961	Quảng Ngãi province	Geological engineering	Kinh	Male		
3	Phan Văn Khải	New	—	Not	—	1933	1959	Hồ Chí Minh City	Economics	Kinh	Male		
4	Nông Đức Mạnh	New	—	Reelected	1	1940	1963	Bắc Kạn Province	Economics & carpentry	Tày	Male		
5	Phạm Thế Duyệt	New	—	Not	—	1936	1965	Hải Dương province	Mining engineering & economic management	Kinh	Male		
6	Nguyễn Phú Trọng	By-election	—	Not	—	1944	1968	Hà Nội City	Political science & philology	Kinh	Male		

== Bibliography ==
- Abuza, Zachary (December 1998). "Leadership Transition in Vietnam since the Eighth Party Congress: The Unfinished Congress". Asian Survey. 38 (12). University of California Press: 1105–1121. doi:10.2307/2645824. JSTOR 2645824.
