= 9th Central Committee =

9th Central Committee may refer to:

- Central Committee of the 9th Congress of the Russian Communist Party (Bolsheviks), 1920–1921
- 9th Central Committee of the Chinese Communist Party, 1969–1973
- 9th Central Committee of the Lao People's Revolutionary Party, 2011–2016
- 9th Central Committee of the Communist Party of Vietnam, 2001–2006
