= 9th Politburo of the Communist Party of Vietnam =

Politburo of Vietnam's Communist Party

The 9th Politburo of the Communist Party of Vietnam (CPV), formally the 9th Political Bureau of the Central Committee of the Communist Party of Vietnam (Vietnamese: Bộ Chính trị Ban Chấp hành trung ương Đảng Cộng sản Việt Nam Khoá IX), was elected at the 1st Plenary Session of the 9th Central Committee in the immediate aftermath of the 9th National Congress.

== Members ==
Members of the 9th Politburo of the Communist Party of Vietnam
Rank	Name	8th POL		10th POL		Birth	PM	Birthplace	Education	Ethnicity	Gender	Ref.
Rank	Name	New	Rank	New	Rank	Birth	PM	Birthplace	Education	Ethnicity	Gender	Ref.
1	Nông Đức Mạnh	Old	4	Reelected	—	1940	1963	Bắc Kạn Province	Economics & carpentry	Tày	Male	
2	Trần Đức Lương	Old	2	Not	—	1937	1961	Quảng Ngãi province	Geological engineering	Kinh	Male	
3	Phan Văn Khải	Old	3	Not	—	1933	1959	Hồ Chí Minh City	Economics	Kinh	Male	
4	Nguyễn Minh Triết	Old	18	Reelected	4	1942	1965	Bình Dương province	Mathematics & political science	Kinh	Male	
5	Nguyễn Tấn Dũng	Old	15	Reelected	3	1949	1967	Cà Mau province	Law	Kinh	Male	
6	Lê Minh Hương	Old	13	Not	—	1936	—	Hà Tĩnh province	Military science	Kinh	Male	
7	Nguyễn Phú Trọng	Old	19	Reelected	6	1944	1968	Hà Nội City	Political science & philology	Kinh	Male	
8	Phan Diễn	Old	17	Not	—	1937	1962	Quảng Nam province	—	Kinh	Male	
9	Lê Hồng Anh	New	—	Reelected	2	1949	1968	Kiên Giang province	Political science	Kinh	Male	
10	Trương Tấn Sang	Old	11	Reelected	5	1949	1969	Long An province	Law	Kinh	Male	
11	Phạm Văn Trà	New	—	Not	—	1935	—	Bắc Ninh province	Military science	Kinh	Male	
12	Nguyễn Văn An	Old	9	Not	—	1937	1959	Nam Định province	Electrical engineering	Kinh	Male	
13	Trương Quang Được	New	—	Not	—	1940	—	Quảng Nam province	Mechanical engineering & economics	Kinh	Male	
14	Trần Đình Hoan	New	—	Not	—	1939	1962	Hưng Yên province	Labour economics	Kinh	Male	
15	Nguyễn Khoa Điềm	New	—	Not	—	1943	—	Thừa Thiên Huế province	—	Kinh	Male	

== Bibliography ==
- Chân dung 19 ủy viên Bộ Chính trị khóa XII
