= 16 Word Guideline =

The 16 Word Guideline, or the 16-letter Principle (Chinese: 十六字方针; Vietnamese: Phương châm 16 chữ) is a set of diplomatic principles acknowledged between the People's Republic of China and the Socialist Republic of Vietnam in 1999 as the two countries sought to improve their strained relations after the Cambodian-Vietnamese War and the subsequent Sino-Vietnamese War.

These principles, said to be "guiding the development of bilateral relations in the new century", were jointly set by the highest leaders from both countries' ruling communist parties: Lê Khả Phiêu, Vietnamese Communist Party's general secretary and Jiang Zemin, Chinese Communist Party's general secretary.

== Contents ==
The contents of the "16 words" are disputed among various sources. However, there are two distinct versions of this informal guideline that are widely known: a Chinese version and a Vietnamese version.

The Chinese version, often cited by high-ranking Chinese officials in many official visits between the two countries and is believed to be the original version proposed by the Chinese prior to the 1999 meeting, is as follows:

Chinese	Sino-Vietnamese	English
山水相連	Sơn thủy tương liên,	Our borders interlinked,
理想相通	Lý tưởng tương thông,	Ideals interconnected,
文化相同	Văn hóa tương đồng,	Cultures interwoven,
運命相關	Vận mệnh tương quan.	And our fates intertwined.

The Vietnamese version, said to be the adaptation of the aforementioned version and commonly cited in Vietnamese state-run media during high-level visits between Vietnam and China, is as follows:

Vietnamese	Chinese	Sino-Vietnamese	English
Láng giềng hữu nghị,	睦邻友好	Mục lân hữu hảo,	Friendly neighbourliness,
Hợp tác toàn diện,	全面合作	Toàn diện hợp tác,	Comprehensive cooperation,
Ổn định lâu dài,	长期稳定	Trường kỳ ổn định,	Long-term stability,
Hướng tới tương lai.	面向未来	Diện hướng vị lai.	Future-oriented thinking.

== Controversies ==
The 16 Word Guideline is often the subject of controversies and public discourse in Vietnam, especially during important diplomatic events between Vietnam and China. Government critics view the principle, among other agreements with China during the normalization of relations between the two countries, as a concession to China. This view is said to stem from anti-communist sentiments as well as deep-rooted wariness since the people of Vietnam has been at constant war with China for millennia and because of territorial disputes regarding Paracel and Spratly.

== See also ==
- China–Vietnam relations
- Territorial disputes in the South China Sea
