= Võ Hồng Phúc =

Vietnamese politician

Võ Hồng Phúc (born October 19, 1945 in Vinh town, Nghệ An Province, Vietnam) is a retired Senior Vietnamese communist politician who was the Minister of Planning and Investment in Vietnam from 2002 to 2011.

Phúc graduated in 1968 from the Hanoi University of Technology. After graduation, he became an employee of the Department of Industry of the SPC, rising in 1992 to become vice-chairman. A member of the central committee of the Vietnamese Communist Party, Phúc was the Minister of Planning and Investment from 2002 to 2011.

In October 2003, Phúc visited Washington, D.C.

In 2012, Japan recognized Võ Hồng Phúc's work by awarding him the Grand Cordon class of the Order of the Rising Sun.
