= Lê Khả Phiêu =

Vietnamese politician (1932–2020)

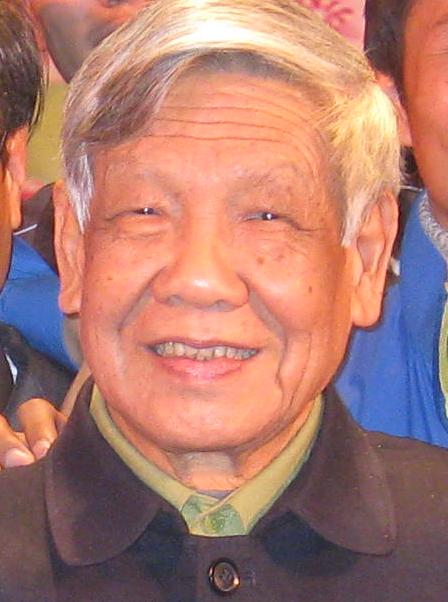
- Lê Khả Phiêu in 2011

General Secretary of the Communist Party of Vietnam
- In office 26 December 1997 – 22 April 2001
- Preceded by: Đỗ Mười
- Succeeded by: Nông Đức Mạnh

Secretary of the Central Military Commission of the Communist Party
- In office 29 December 1997 – 22 April 2001
- Preceded by: Đỗ Mười
- Succeeded by: Nông Đức Mạnh

Permanent Member of the Politburo
- In office 1 July 1996 – 26 December 1997
- General Secretary: Đỗ Mười
- Preceded by: Đào Duy Tùng
- Succeeded by: Phạm Thế Duyệt

Director of the General Political Department of the Vietnam People's Army
- In office 30 September 1991 – 29 December 1997
- Preceded by: Nguyễn Quyết
- Succeeded by: Phạm Thanh Ngân

Personal details
- Born: 27 December 1931 Thanh Hóa province, French Indochina
- Died: 7 August 2020 (aged 88) Hanoi, Vietnam
- Party: Communist Party of Vietnam
- Occupation: Political commissar; politician

Military service
- Allegiance: Vietnam
- Branch: Vietnam People's Army
- Service years: 1950–1997
- Rank: Colonel General
- Conflicts: Cambodian–Vietnamese War; Vietnam War; First Indochina War

Lê Khả Phiêu (Vietnamese pronunciation: [le˧˧ xaː˧˩ fiəw˧˧], 27 December 1931 – 7 August 2020) was a Vietnamese politician and army officer who served as General Secretary of the Communist Party of Vietnam from December 1997 to April 2001. A career political officer in the Vietnam People's Army, he served in the First and Second Indochina Wars and in the Cambodian–Vietnamese War, and became director of the army's General Political Department in 1991.

Phiêu joined the Politburo in 1994 and was chosen in 1997 to complete the term of Đỗ Mười as party leader. His tenure saw a campaign against corruption within the party, a settlement of the land and maritime borders with China, and the 2000 visit of Bill Clinton. He was criticized for weak leadership, a stagnant economy and alleged misuse of military intelligence, and the Central Committee replaced him with Nông Đức Mạnh in April 2001.

== Early life ==
Phiêu was born on 27 December 1931 in Đông Khê commune, Đông Sơn district, Thanh Hóa province. From 1947 to 1949, he taught literacy classes in his commune. In 1949, he was in charge of propaganda and headed the office of the commune party cell, and he joined the Indochinese Communist Party on 19 June 1949.

== Military career ==
=== First Indochina War ===
In May 1950, Phiêu enlisted in the army. By August 1954, he had risen from private to squad leader, platoon leader, deputy company political officer and company political officer in the 66th Regiment of the 304th Division. After a basic military and political course from September 1954 to March 1955, he served as deputy head and then head of the political office of the 66th Regiment until March 1958. In April 1958, he enrolled at the Intermediate and Advanced Political School.

=== Vietnam War ===
From June 1961 to 1966, Phiêu held cadre and organization posts in the political department of the 304th Division, and then became deputy political commissar and political commissar of its 9th Regiment in the Hữu Ngạn Military Region. In July 1967, he went to fight on the Trị Thiên battlefield as political commissar of the 9th Regiment, and from January 1968 he also commanded the regiment. In 1970, he became head of the organization department of the Trị Thiên Military Region. He served as its deputy political director from October 1971 and became its political director in March 1974, in a command that later became the 2nd Corps.

=== Southwestern border and Cambodia ===
In February 1978, Phiêu became political director and then deputy political commissar of Military Region 9. From 1978 to 1981, he was among the leaders of the region's forces in the war against the Khmer Rouge on Vietnam's southwestern border, where local troops knew him as "Uncle Nam Phiêu". During the 1979 Cambodian–Vietnamese War, he was a member of the frontline high command of Military Region 9. He became the region's deputy commander for political affairs in August 1980.

The command of Vietnamese volunteer forces in Cambodia, known as Command 719, was founded in May 1981, and according to the People's Army Newspaper, Phiêu was appointed head of its political department at that time. His official biography dates this appointment to April 1984, when he was also promoted to major general. In 1986, he became deputy commander for political affairs of Command 719.

=== General Political Department ===
Phiêu was promoted to lieutenant general in June 1988, and in August he became deputy director of the General Political Department, responsible for organization, cadres and security. At the 7th National Congress in June 1991, he was elected to the Central Committee and became director of the General Political Department and a standing member of the Central Military Party Committee. He was promoted to colonel general in June 1992.

== Rise in the party ==
Phiêu was elected to the Secretariat at the third plenum of the 7th Central Committee in June 1992. He was a protégé of the general secretary Đỗ Mười. At the party's mid-term national conference in January 1994, he was elected to the Politburo. At the 8th National Congress in June 1996, he was re-elected to the Central Committee and the Politburo, joined the Politburo's Standing Board and was put in charge of the Central Internal Political Protection Board. He was also a deputy to the 9th and 10th National Assembly.

== General Secretary (1997–2001) ==
In December 1997, at the fourth plenum of the 8th Central Committee, Phiêu replaced Đỗ Mười as general secretary. He was appointed to complete the remainder of the five-year term, and he also became secretary of the Central Military Party Committee. The New York Times described his selection as a compromise. Immediately after taking office, he reshuffled the Politburo's Standing Board to strengthen his authority.

=== Domestic policy ===
Phiêu was a consistent supporter of strong administrative, inspection and control measures to combat corruption. In 1999, the party launched a two-year national campaign of criticism and self-criticism among its 2.3 million members. VnExpress wrote that he is remembered for a resolution setting out the task of building the party into a force for fighting corruption. According to the political scientist Carlyle Thayer, his focus on political stability and party unity continually took priority over economic concerns, and his leadership style led to "reform immobilism". His leadership was also tested by rural unrest during 2000.

Phiêu has often been viewed as a conservative. The historian Martin Gainsborough has challenged this categorization, pointing to Phiêu's outspoken comments about problems in the party.

=== Foreign relations ===
In 1999, Phiêu visited Beijing, where he met the Chinese Communist Party general secretary Jiang Zemin and announced a joint 16 Word Guideline for improved bilateral relations, and a Joint Statement for Comprehensive Cooperation was issued in 2000. In 2000, Vietnam and China resolved long-standing disputes over their land border and maritime rights in the Gulf of Tonkin, including the cession of land surrounding the Friendship Pass to China. Critics accused Phiêu of pursuing a pro-China policy and of approving concessions to China in the border negotiations.

Phiêu delayed the signing of Vietnam's first bilateral trade agreement with the United States because he was concerned about the potential Chinese response. Critics of his foreign policy contended that he deferred too much to China. In November 2000, Bill Clinton became the first US president to visit Vietnam since the end of the war in 1975, and he met Phiêu, President Trần Đức Lương and Prime Minister Phan Văn Khải. Phiêu told Clinton that the United States must bear a disproportionate share of responsibility for the Vietnam War, and that "the past can neither be changed nor forgotten". According to The New York Times, Clinton described the exchange as "spirited", and Phiêu told him that Vietnam had "reaffirmed socialism" after the collapse of the Soviet Union. Thayer called the meeting "a stilted affair" and wrote that Phiêu was playing to party conservatives, while reformers saw his rigid views as backward.

=== Removal ===
During 2000, the Central Committee's three advisers, members of the former leadership troika, sent a joint letter criticizing Phiêu for weak leadership. Phiêu angered the former leadership by proposing to abolish their posts as advisers, and he advocated merging the posts of general secretary and state president. He was accused of misusing the military intelligence services to wiretap his fellow Politburo members. Thayer wrote that Phiêu had used a specialized unit known as A10 in General Department II for this purpose. He was also criticized for ineffective leadership, failure to revive the stagnant economy and nepotism in appointing associates from Thanh Hóa.

In April 2001, on the eve of the last Central Committee plenum before the 9th National Congress, the Politburo voted 12 to 6 to recommend Phiêu's reappointment, but the Central Committee overturned the recommendation. Thayer reported that China had lobbied for his retention. On 17 April 2001, the Central Committee removed Phiêu amid dissatisfaction with his leadership and chose Nông Đức Mạnh to replace him, and Mạnh was confirmed as general secretary at the congress.

== Later life ==
Phiêu retired in October 2006. Before the 10th National Congress in 2006, he criticized what he called the "illness of partyization" (bệnh đảng hoá), meaning the party's control of everything. In 2013, the Cambodian prime minister Hun Sen visited him at his home in Hanoi and called him a former superior. Hun Sen also described Phiêu as a good friend of Cambodia. In 2014, he received the 65-year party membership badge.

== Death and funeral ==
Phiêu died at his home in Hanoi on 7 August 2020, after a period of serious illness. He was 88, although Vietnamese state media gave his age as 89. Two days of national mourning were held on 14 and 15 August. His body lay in state at the National Funeral House in Hanoi, where General Secretary Nguyễn Phú Trọng headed the funeral committee. He was buried at Mai Dịch Cemetery on the afternoon of 15 August. Memorial services were also held in Ho Chi Minh City and Thanh Hóa. Chinese leader Xi Jinping sent condolences, calling Phiêu a close comrade and friend of the Chinese Communist Party and the Chinese people.

The New York Times wrote that Phiêu left office ignominiously "amid unusually public infighting". Thayer wrote that the ideological stance that first won Phiêu support "later proved his undoing".

== Awards and honors ==
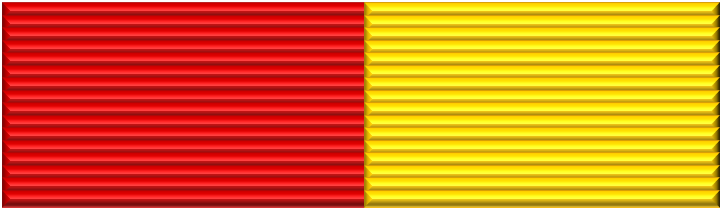

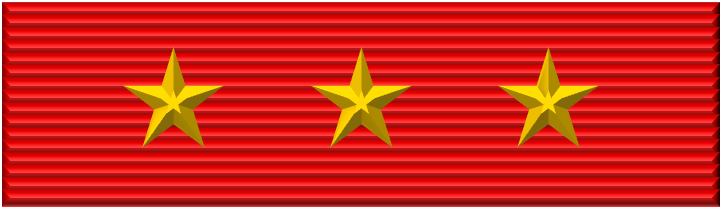

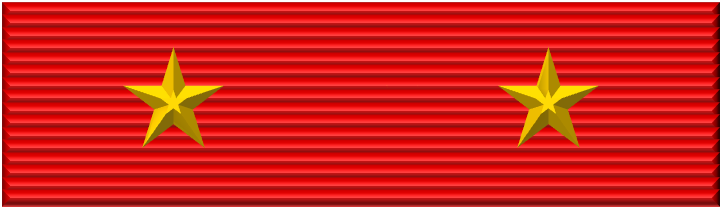

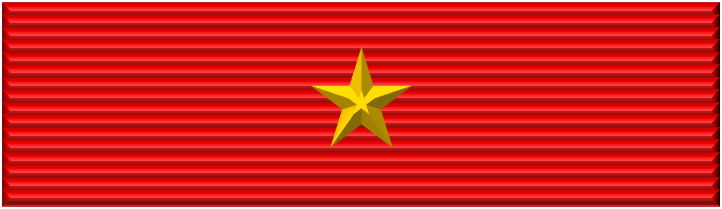

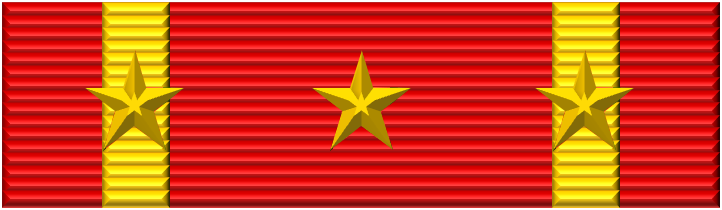

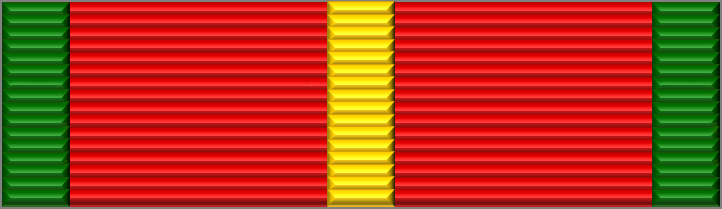

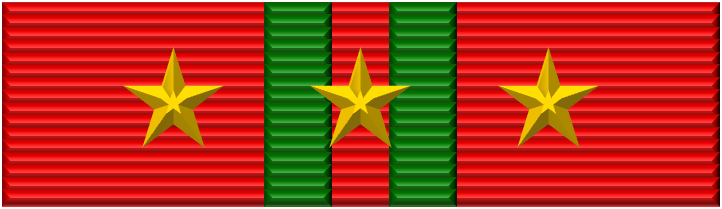

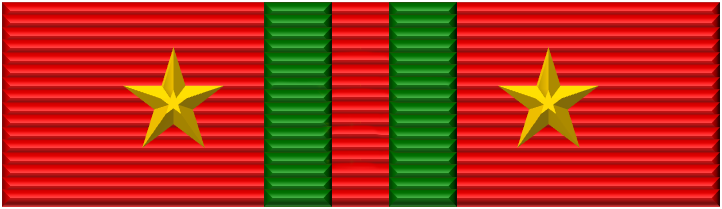

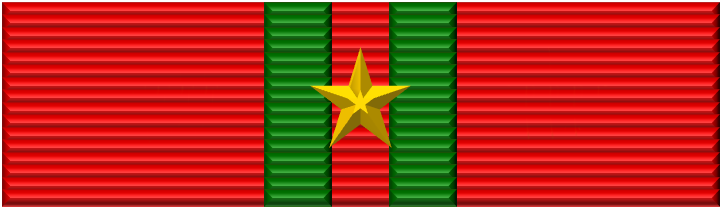

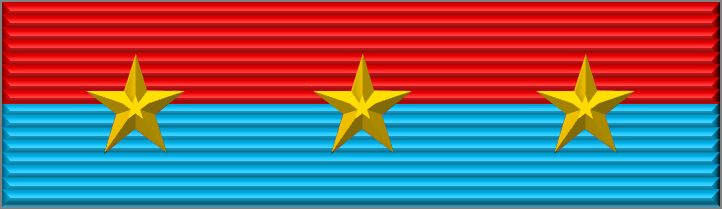

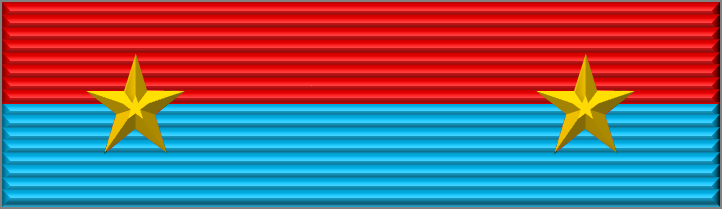

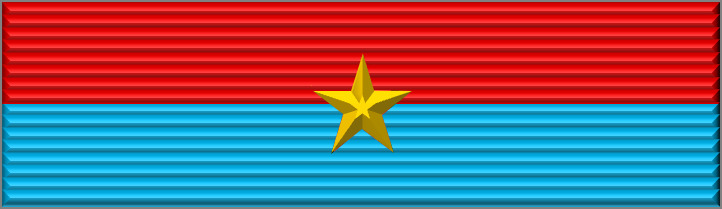

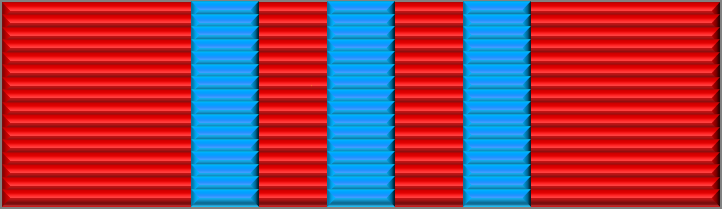

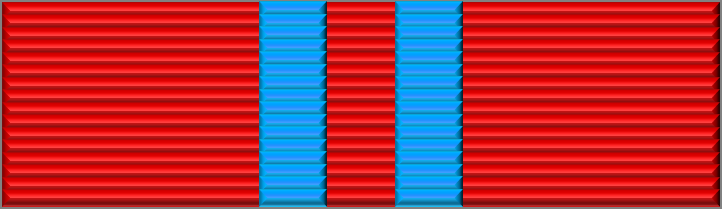

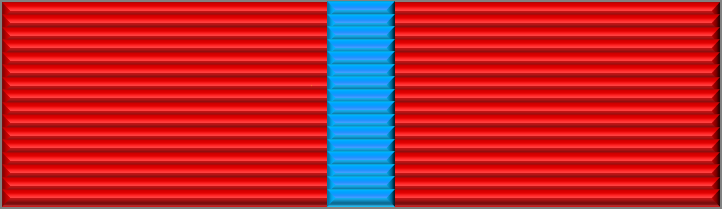

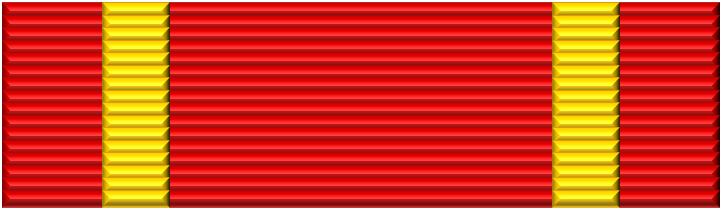

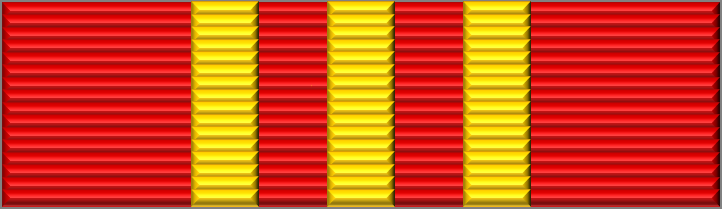

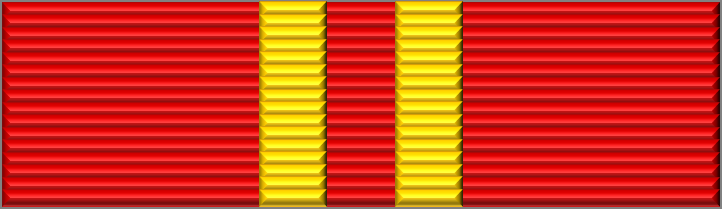

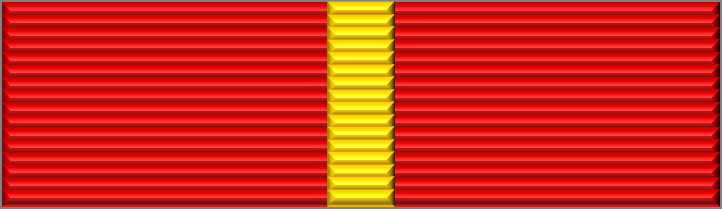

Gold Star Order (2007)
Military Exploit Order; First class	Military Exploit Order; Second class	Military Exploit Order; Third class	Resistance Order; First class	Resolution for Victory Order; Third class
Feat Order; First class	Feat Order; Second class	Feat Order; Third class	Medal for the Victory of Liberation; First Class	Medal for the Victory of Liberation; Second Class
Medal for the Victory of Liberation; Third Class	Liberation Order; First Class	Liberation Order; Second Class	Liberation Order; Third Class	Victory Banner Medal
Glorious Fighter Medal; First Class	Glorious Fighter Medal; Second Class	Glorious Fighter Medal; Third Class	Order of José Martí (Cuba)	Freedom Medal (Laos)

Other decorations include:

- 65-year Party membership badge (2014)

Party political offices
Preceded by Đỗ Mười	General Secretary of the Communist Party of Vietnam; 1997–2001	Succeeded by Nông Đức Mạnh
