= Hồ Đức Việt =

Vietnamese politician

Hồ Đức Việt (13 August 1947 – 31 May 2013) was a Vietnamese politician. Hồ Đức Việt was the Deputy Doctor of Mathematics, former lecturer – Deputy Dean of Mathematics – Mechanical Faculty, Hanoi University, then joined the Ho Chi Minh Communist Youth Union. Later he became First Secretary of the Central Youth Union, he was former Secretary of the Provincial Communist Party Committee Quảng Ninh, and former Secretary of Thái Nguyên Provincial Communist Party Committee, he was the former Politburo Member Central Committee Chairman.

== Early life and career ==
Hồ Đức Việt was born on 13 August 1947 in Quỳnh Lưu District in Nghệ An Province. He was the youngest son of the revolutionary martyr Hồ Mỹ Xuyên (former deputy party secretary of Nghệ An province), he is the grandson of revolutionary Hồ Tùng Mậu. In 1965 Hồ Đức Việt was sent to study in the field of Mathematics – he was Physics at the University of Karlova in Prague (Univerzita Karlova v Praze), Czechoslovakia. He was admitted to the Communist Party of Vietnam on 19 October 1967, and became an official member on 19 October 1968 in Czechoslovakia. In 1974 he successfully defended his doctoral dissertation in Mathematics – Physics.

In 1975, he returned to Vietnam and became a lecturer at the Faculty of Mathematics, Mechanical Engineering, Hanoi University. In 1976, he was appointed deputy secretary of Ho Chi Minh Communist Youth Union of Hanoi University. In 1979, he was appointed Deputy Dean of Mathematics – Mechanical.

In the early 1980s, he was appointed deputy secretary of the Hanoi Youth Union. Later that year, he was appointed as a senior trainee in Paris (France), as the head of the delegation of students in Paris.
