= Russian studies =

Area studies focused on Russia

Russian studies is an interdisciplinary field crossing politics, history, culture, economics, and languages of Russia and its neighborhood, often grouped under Soviet and Communist studies. Russian studies should not be confused with the study of the Russian literature or linguistics, which is often a distinct department within universities.

In university, a Russian studies major includes many cultural classes teaching Russian politics, history, geography, linguistics, Russian language, literature, and arts. Mysticism and folklore are commonly studied, the introduction of Christianity, rule under the tsars and expansion of Russian Empire, later rule under communism, history of the Soviet Union, and its collapse and studies about present-day Russia.

Russian studies rose in prominence during the Cold War, but experienced a decline after the collapse of the Soviet Union. Aggressive behavior by Russia, particularly its invasion of Ukraine, led to increased attention to Russian studies and a reevaluation of its precepts in terms of decolonization.

== See also ==
- Area studies
- Kremlinology
- List of Russian studies centers
- Russian culture
- Slavic studies
- Byzantine studies
- Education in Russia
