= Lê Minh Hương =

Vietnamese politician

Colonel general Lê Minh Hương

Minister of Public Security
- In office 1996 – 28 January 2002
- Prime Minister: Võ Văn Kiệt; Phan Văn Khải
- Preceded by: Bùi Thiện Ngộ
- Succeeded by: Lê Hồng Anh

Member of the Politburo term VIIIth, IXth
- In office 1 July 1996 – 23 May 2004; 7 years, 327 days

Member of the Party Central Committee term VIIth, VIIIth, IXth
- In office 27 June 1991 – 23 May 2004; 12 years, 331 days

Personal details
- Born: 3 October 1936 Sơn Tân, Hương Sơn, Hà Tĩnh, French Indochina
- Died: 23 May 2004 (aged 67) Hanoi, Vietnam
- Spouse: Phạm Thị Hiền
- Children: Lê Minh Hùng; Lê Minh Hà; Lê Minh Hưng

Military service
- Branch/service: Vietnam People's Public Security
- Years of service: 1996–2002
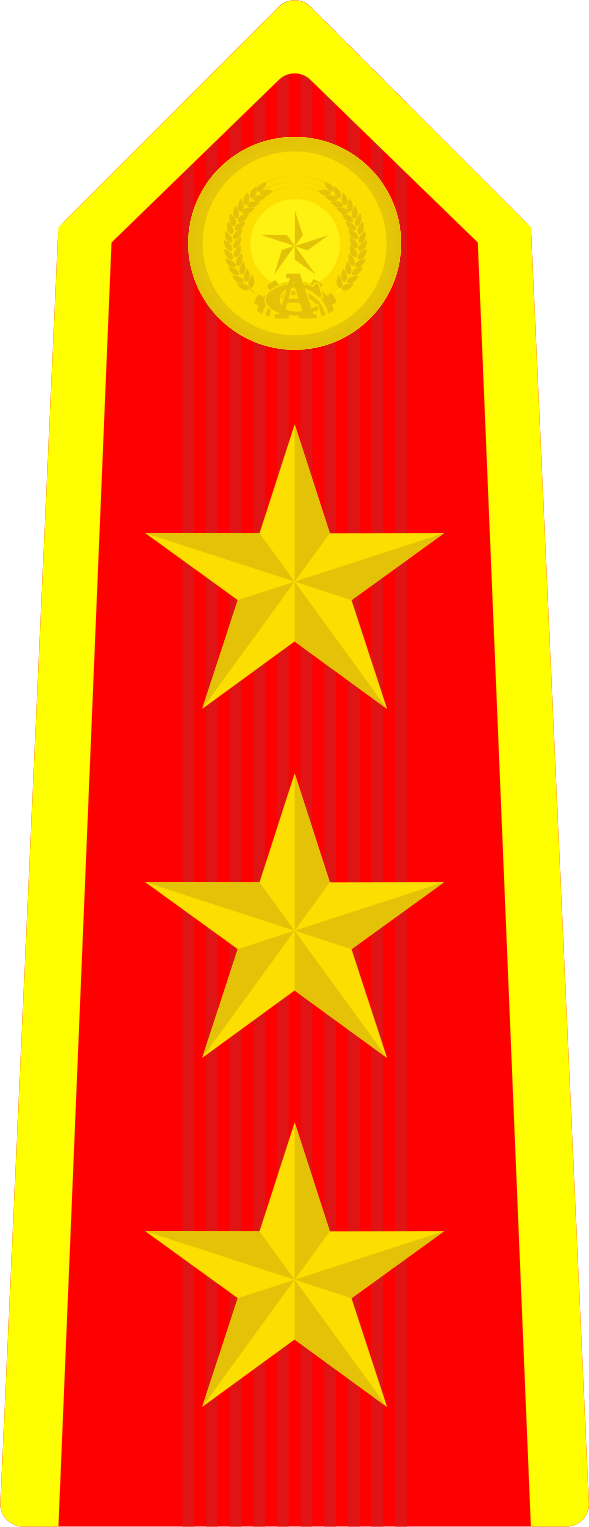
- Rank: Colonel General

Lê Minh Hương (October 3, 1936 – May 23, 2004) was a Vietnamese politician who was the Minister of Public Security of Vietnam from 1996 to 2002. He was born in Hương Sơn District, Hà Tĩnh Province and he was posthumously awarded the Ho Chi Minh Medal by the President on March 5, 2008.

He is the late father of Lê Minh Hưng, the incumbent Prime Minister of Vietnam and former State Bank of Vietnam Governor.

== History of military rank conferment ==
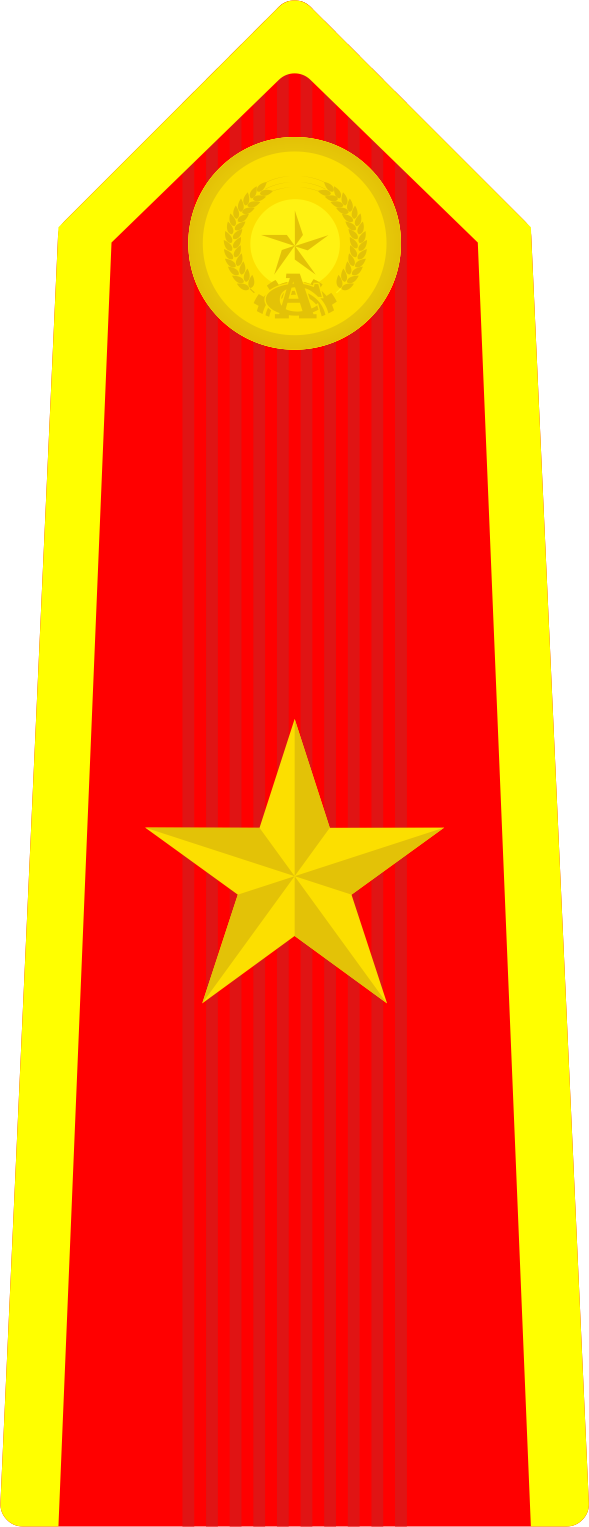
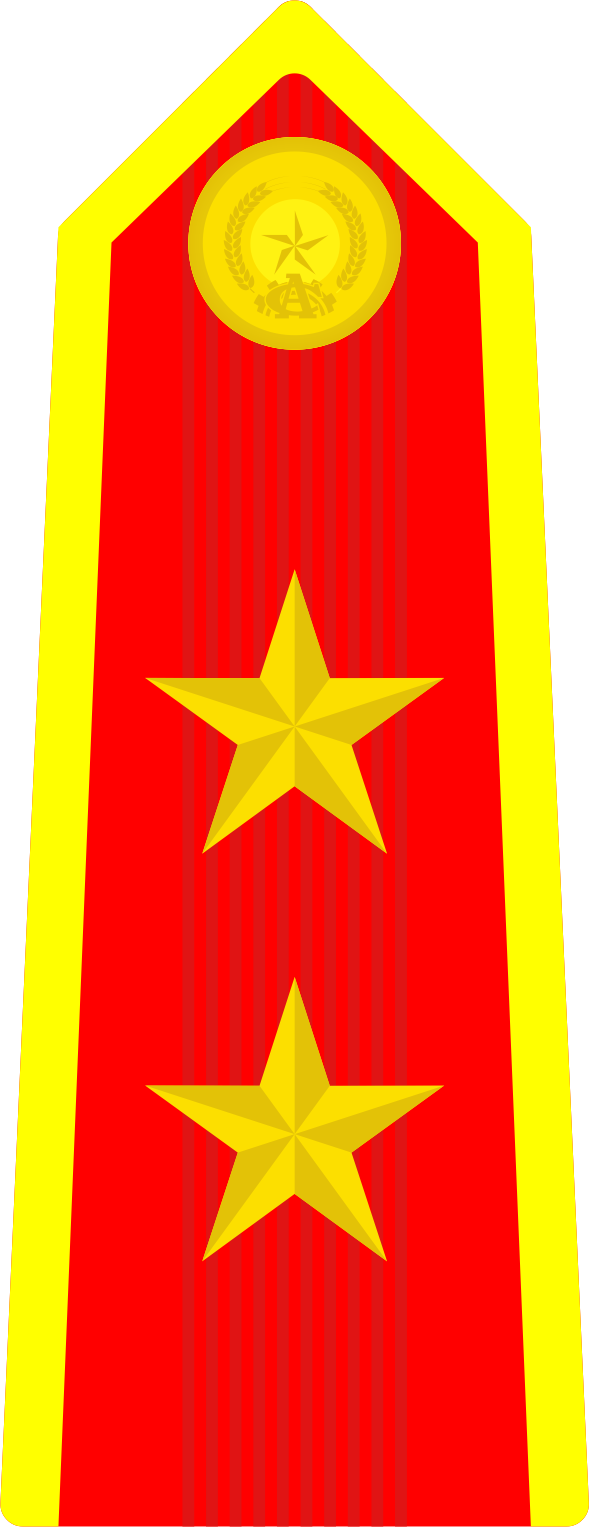
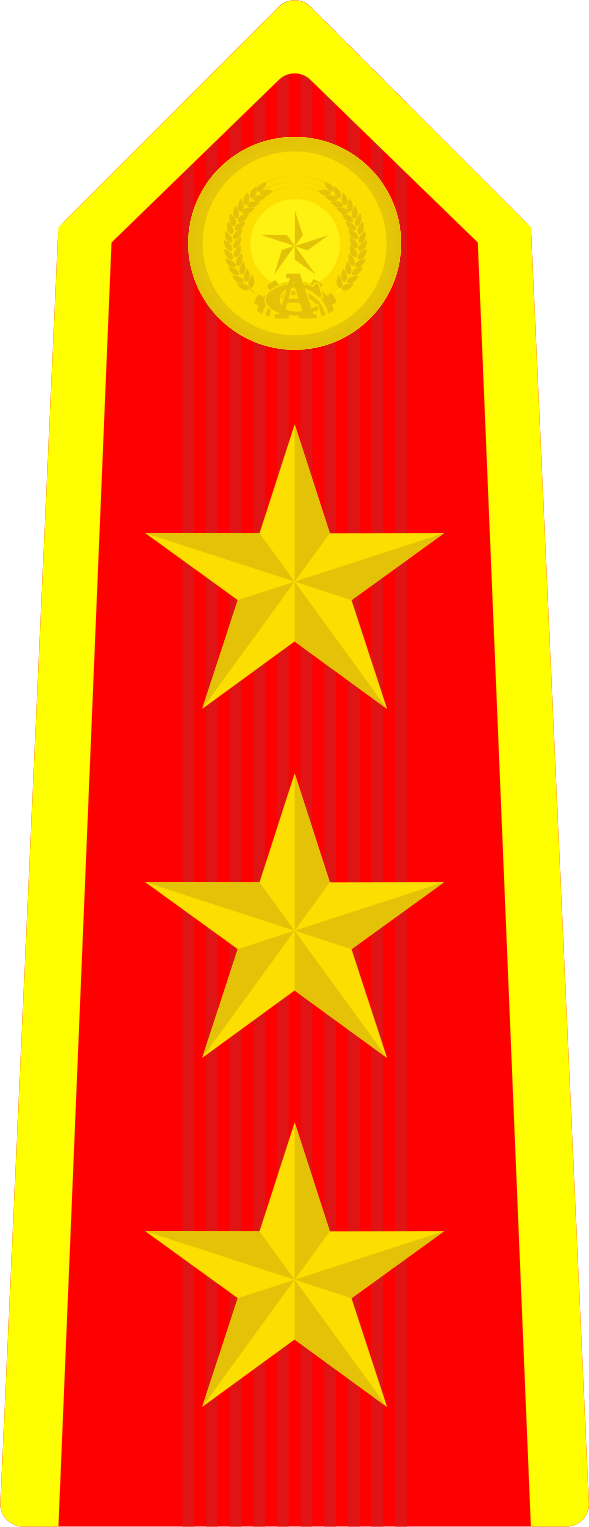
Year of ordination	1990	1992	1998
Rank
Rank name	Major general	Lieutenant general	Colonel general
