= Trương Quang Được =

Trương Quang Được (10 February 1940 – 27 October 2016) was a senior Vietnamese politician. Despite already being a member of Vietnam's Politburo he was additionally appointed Vice-Chairman of Vietnam's National Assembly in 2003.
