= Asian Survey =

Bimonthly academic journal of Asian studies

- Discipline: Asian studies
- Language: English
- Edited by: Uk Heo

Publication details
- Former names: Far Eastern Survey, Memorandum (Institute of Pacific Relations, American Council)
- History: 1932–present
- Publisher: University of California Press on behalf of the Institute of East Asian Studies at the University of California, Berkeley (United States)
- Frequency: Bimonthly
- Impact factor: 1.9 (2025)

Standard abbreviations
- ISO 4: Asian Surv.

Indexing
- ISSN: 0004-4687 (print); 1533-838X (web)
- LCCN: 64044237
- JSTOR: 00044687
- OCLC no.: 610384862

Links
- Journal homepage; Online access; Online archive

Asian Survey: A Bimonthly Review of Contemporary Asian Affairs is a bimonthly academic journal of Asian studies published by the University of California Press on behalf of the Institute of East Asian Studies at the University of California, Berkeley.

== History ==
The journal was established in 1932 as Memorandum (Institute of Pacific Relations, American Council), but was renamed Far Eastern Survey in 1935. It acquired its current name in 1961. The journal uses double-blind peer review.

According to the Journal Citation Reports, it has a 2023 impact factor of 1.3. The editor-in-chief is Uk Heo (University of Wisconsin-Milwaukee).

== Abstracting and indexing ==
The journal is abstracted and indexed in:

- GEOBASE
- Scopus
- MLA - Modern Language Association Database
- Worldwide Political Science Abstracts
- Historical Abstracts
