= Lê Hồng Anh =

Vietnamese politician

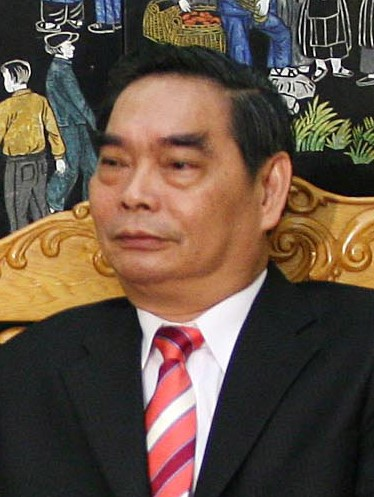

Permanent Member of the Secretariat
- In office 3 August 2011 – 4 February 2016
- General Secretary: Nguyễn Phú Trọng
- Preceded by: Trương Tấn Sang
- Succeeded by: Đinh Thế Huynh

Minister of Public Security
- In office 28 January 2002 – 3 August 2011
- Prime Minister: Phan Văn Khải; Nguyễn Tấn Dũng
- Preceded by: Lê Minh Hương
- Succeeded by: Trần Đại Quang

Chairman of the Central Inspection Commission of the Communist Party of Vietnam
- In office 22 April 2001 – 28 January 2002
- Preceded by: Nguyễn Thị Xuân Mỹ
- Succeeded by: Nguyễn Văn Chi

Member of the Politburo
- In office 22 April 2001 – 27 January 2016

Vice Chairman of the Central Inspection Commission
- In office June 1997 – 22 April 2001
- Chair: Nguyễn Thị Xuân Mỹ

Party Secretary of Kiên Giang
- In office December 1994 – June 1997
- Preceded by: Nguyễn Tấn Dũng
- Succeeded by: Lâm Chí Việt

Personal details
- Born: November 12, 1949 (age 76) Kien Giang Province, Vietnam

Military service
- Branch/service: Vietnam People's Public Security
- Years of service: 2002-2011
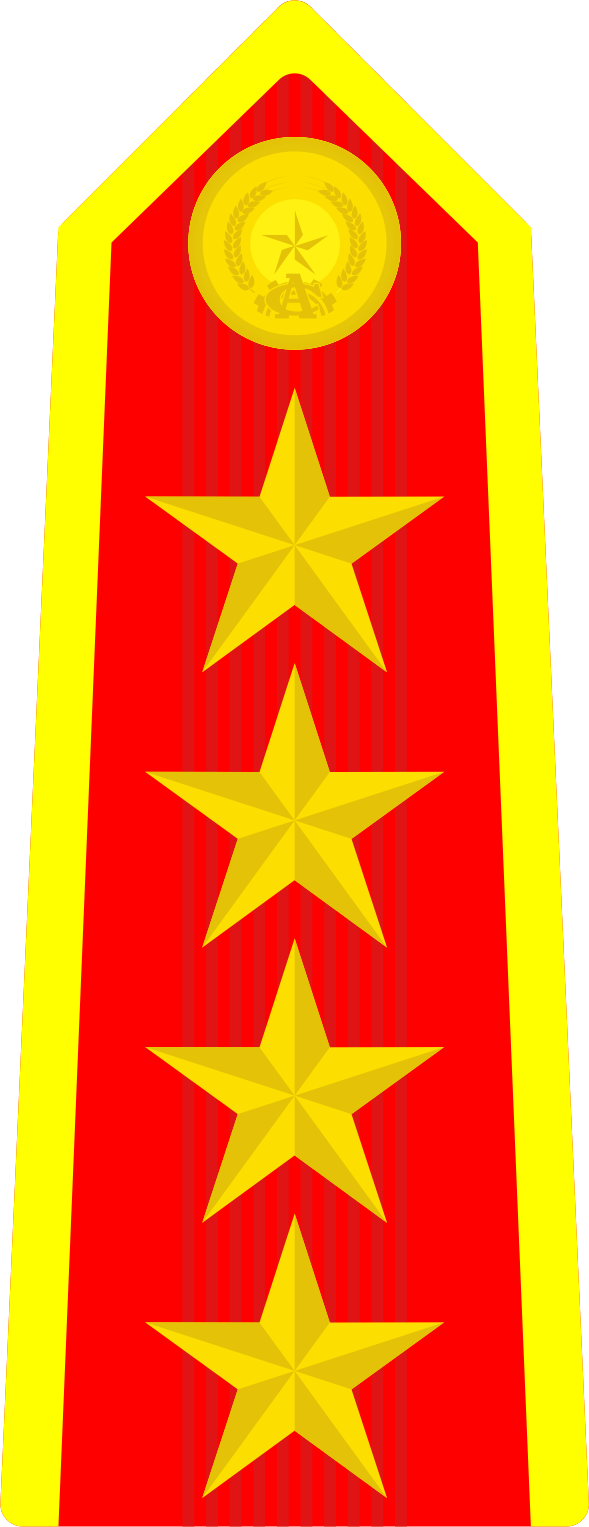
- Rank: General

Lê Hồng Anh (Vietnamese pronunciation: [le˧˧ həwŋ͡m˨˩ ʔajŋ̟˧˧]; born November 12, 1949) is a Vietnamese politician who was the Minister of Public Security of Vietnam from 2002 to 2011. He was conferred the rank of General by the President of Vietnam on January 9, 2005.

In 2011, Lê Hồng Anh was a member of the Politburo, Permanent Member of the Party Central Committee's Secretariat of the Communist Party of Vietnam, one the country's five key leaders, along with General Secretary, President, Prime Minister, and Chairman of the National Assembly.

Lê Hồng Anh is also called "Út Anh", and was born in Vĩnh Bình Bắc Commune, Vĩnh Thuận District, Kiên Giang Province in southern Vietnam. Lê Hồng Anh studied law and gained a bachelor of law and a bachelor of politics. Lê Hồng Anh became member of the Communist Party of Vietnam on 2 March 1968.

== Career ==
In 1960: Participated in revolutionary activities.

Kien Giang Province

1960–1968: Worked as a commune Youth Union official in Vinh Binh Bac Commune, Vinh Thuan District, Kien Giang Province.

1969–1977: Served as a provincial Youth Union official, then a member of the Executive Committee, a member of the Standing Committee of the provincial Youth Union, a member of the Rach Gia Town Party Committee and Secretary of the Rach Gia Youth Union, and Deputy Secretary of the Kien Giang Provincial Youth Union.

1978–1980: Studied and graduated from the Nguyen Ai Quoc Central School (now the Ho Chi Minh National Academy of Politics).

1981: Became a member of the Provincial Party Committee (2nd term), Secretary of the Provincial Youth Union, and then Deputy Head of the Kien Giang Provincial Party Committee's Organization Department.

1986–1991: Held positions including: Member of the Provincial Party Committee's Standing Committee, Chairman of the Inspection Committee, Head of the Provincial Party Committee's Organization Department, Secretary of the Chau Thanh District Party Committee (Kien Giang), and then Standing Deputy Secretary of the Kien Giang Provincial Party Committee.

June 1996: At the 8th National Congress of the Party, he was elected a member of the Central Committee of the Party and Secretary of the Kien Giang Provincial Party Committee.

Central Inspection Committee

From June 1997: Served as Vice Chairman of the Central Inspection Committee.

April 2001: At the 9th National Congress of the Party, he was elected to the Central Committee of the Party, and the Central Committee elected him to the Politburo, assigning him the positions of Secretary of the Central Committee of the Party and Chairman of the Central Inspection Committee. He was also a member of the 11th National Assembly.

Minister of Public Security (2002–2011)

August 2002: At the first session of the 11th National Assembly, he was approved by the National Assembly to serve as Minister of Public Security. He was considered the youngest Minister of Public Security in nearly 26 years prior to that.

January 2003: Relinquished the positions of Secretary of the Central Committee and Chairman of the Central Inspection Committee.

January 9, 2005: President Tran Duc Luong signed Decision No. 12 QD/CTN to promote Mr. Le Hong Anh, Politburo member and Minister of Public Security, to the rank of Senior General of the People's Public Security. The announcement ceremony was held on January 10, 2005.

April 2006: At the 10th National Congress of the Party, he was elected to the Central Committee of the Party, and the Central Committee elected him to the Politburo.

July 2006: Appointed Secretary of the Central Public Security Party Committee for the 2006–2010 term.

August 2, 2007: At the first session of the 12th National Assembly, he was re-approved to hold the position of Minister of Public Security.

== Awards and honors ==
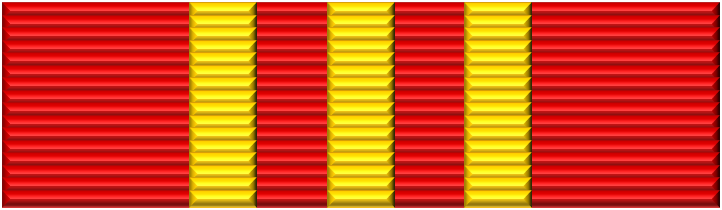
- Order of Ho Chi Minh (2025)
