= 3rd Central Committee of the Workers' Party of Vietnam =

Central Committee of the Workers' Party of Vietnam

3rd Central Committee
- Symbol of the Communist Party of Vietnam

10 September 1960 – 20 December 1976 (16 years, 101 days) Overview
- Type: Central Committee of the Workers' Party of Vietnam
- Election: 3rd National Congress

Leadership
- Chairman: Hồ Chí Minh (1960-1969)
- First Secretary: Lê Duẩn
- Politburo: 11 members 2 alternates
- Secretariat: 7 members

Members
- Total: 47 members

Alternates
- Total: 31 alternates

Apparatus

The 3rd Central Committee of the Workers' Party of Vietnam (WPV) was elected at the 3rd WPV National Congress. It elected the 3rd Politburo and the 3rd Secretariat.

== Plenums ==
The Central Committee (CC) is not a permanent institution. Instead, it convenes plenary sessions between party congresses. When the CC is not in session, decision-making powers are delegated to its internal bodies; that is, the Politburo and the Secretariat. None of these organs are permanent bodies either; typically, they convene several times a month.

Plenary Sessions of the 3rd Central Committee
Plenum	Date	Length	Ref.
1st Plenary Session	10 September 1960	1 day	
2nd Plenary Session	November 1960	Not made public.	
3rd Plenary Session	30 December 1960 – 5 January 1961	6 days	
4th Plenary Session	April 1961	Not made public.	
5th Plenary Session	July 1961	Not made public	
6th Plenary Session	30 November – 2 December 1961	3 days	
7th Plenary Session	June 1962	Not made public.	
8th Plenary Session	April 1963	Not made public.	
9th Plenary Session	December 1963	Not made public.	
10th Plenary Session	December 1964	Not made public.	
11th Plenary Session	25–27 March 1965	1 day	
12th Plenary Session	27 December 1965	1 day	
13th Plenary Session	23–26 January 1967	4 days	
14th Plenary Session	January 1968	Not made public.	
15th Plenary Session	28–31 August 1968	4 days	
16th Plenary Session	8 May 1969	1 day	
17th Plenary Session	September 1969	Not made public.	
18th Plenary Session	18 January 1970	1 day	
19th Plenary Session	28 February 1971	1 day	
20th Plenary Session	4 April 1972	1 day	
21st Plenary Session	July 1973	Not made public.	
22nd Plenary Session	December 1973	Not made public.	
23rd Plenary Session	25 December 1974	1 day	
24th Plenary Session	September 1975	Not made public.	
25th Plenary Session	24 September – 24 October 1976	31 days	

== Composition ==
=== Members ===
Members of the 3rd Central Committee of the Workers' Party of Vietnam
Listing	Name	2nd CC	4th CC	BY	PM	Birthplace	Education	Ethnicity	Gender	Ref.
1	Hồ Chí Minh	Old	Not	1890	1930	Nghệ An province	Marxist studies	Kinh	Male	
2	Lê Duẩn	Old	Reelected	1907	1930	Quảng Trị Province	—	Kinh	Male	
3	Võ Nguyễn Giáp	Old	Reelected	1911	1930	Quảng Bình province	—	Kinh	Male	
4	Phạm Hùng	Old	Reelected	1912	1930	Vĩnh Long province	—	Kinh	Male	
5	Nguyễn Duy Trinh	Old	Reelected	1910	1930	Nghệ An province	—	Kinh	Male	
6	Nguyễn Chí Thanh	Old	Not	1914	1937	Thừa Thiên Huế province	Military science	Kinh	Male	
7	Tôn Đức Thắng	Old	Reelected	1888	1930	Long Xuyên province	—	Kinh	Male	
8	Chu Văn Tấn	Old	Not	1909	1936	Lạng Sơn province	Military science	Kinh	Male	
9	Nguyễn Văn Linh	New	Reelected	1915	1936	Hưng Yên province	—	Kinh	Male	
10	Trường Chinh	Old	Reelected	1907	1930	Nam Định province	—	Kinh	Male	
11	Phạm Văn Đồng	Old	Reelected	1906	1930	Quảng Ngãi province	—	Kinh	Male	
12	Nguyễn Lương Bằng	Old	Reelected	1904	1930	Hải Dương province	—	Kinh	Male	
13	Văn Tiến Dũng	Alternate	Reelected	1917	1937	Hà Nội City	—	Kinh	Male	
14	Nguyễn Văn Trân	Alternate	Not	1917	1935	Bắc Ninh province	—	Kinh	Male	
15	Song Hào	New	Reelected	1917	1939	Nam Định province	—	Kinh	Male	
16	Phan Văn Đáng	New	Reelected	1918	1939	Vĩnh Long province	—	Kinh	Male	
17	Phạm Văn Xô	New	Not	1910	1931	Nam Định province	—	Kinh	Male	
18	Trần Tử Bình	New	Not	1907	1930	Hà Nam province	Military science	Kinh	Male	
19	Lê Thanh Nghị	Old	Reelected	1911	1930	Hải Dương province	—	Kinh	Male	
20	Tố Hữu	Old	Reelected	1920	1938	Thừa Thiên Huế province	—	Kinh	Male	
21	Xuân Thuỷ	Old	Reelected	1912	1941	Hà Đông City	—	Kinh	Male	
22	Ung Văn Khiêm	New	Not	1910	1930	Long Xuyên province	—	Kinh	Male	
23	Lê Văn Lương	Old	Reelected	1912	1930	Bắc Ninh province	—	Kinh	Male	
24	Nguyễn Thị Thập	Old	Reelected	1908	1931	Mỹ Tho province	—	Kinh	Female	
25	Võ Chí Công	New	Reelected	1912	1935	Đà Nẵng City	—	Kinh	Male	
26	Lê Đức Thọ	Old	Reelected	1911	1930	Nam Định province	—	Kinh	Male	
27	Trần Quốc Hoàn	Old	Reelected	1916	1934	Nghệ An province	—	Kinh	Male	
28	Hoàng Anh	Alternate	Reelected	1912	1937	Thừa Thiên Huế province	—	Kinh	Male	
29	Đỗ Mười	Old	Reelected	1917	1939	Hà Nội City	—	Kinh	Male	
30	Hoàng Quốc Việt	Old	Reelected	1905	1930	Bắc Ninh province	—	Kinh	Male	
31	Hoàng Văn Hoan	Old	Not	1905	1930	Nghệ An province	—	Kinh	Male	
32	Lê Hiến Mai	New	Reelected	1918	1939	Sơn Tây City	—	Kinh	Male	
33	Lê Quảng Ba	New	Not	1914	1936	Cao Bằng province	Military science	Tày	Male	
34	Trần Nam Trung	Old	Reelected	1912	1931	Quảng Ngãi province	Military science	Kinh	Male	
35	Nguyễn Côn	New	Reelected	1916	1937	Nghệ An province	—	Kinh	Male	
36	Hà Huy Giáp	Alternate	Not	1908	1930	Hà Tĩnh province	—	Kinh	Male	
37	Bùi Quang Tạo	Old	Reelected	1913	—	Thái Bình province	—	Kinh	Male	
38	Trần Hữu Dực	Old	Reelected	1910	1930	Quảng Trị province	—	Kinh	Male	
39	Nguyễn Lam	New	Reelected	1922	1943	Hà Nam province	—	Kinh	Male	
40	Nguyễn Khang	Alternate	Not	1919	1936	Thái Bình province	—	Kinh	Male	
41	Hà Thị Quế	New	Reelected	1921	1941	Ninh Bình province	—	Kinh	Female	
42	Hoàng Văn Thái	New	Reelected	1915	1938	Thái Bình province	Military science	Kinh	Male	
43	Chu Huy Mân	New	Reelected	1913	1930	Nghệ An province	Military science	Kinh	Male	
44	Võ Thúc Đồng	New	Reelected	1914	1930	Nghệ An province	—	Kinh	Male	
45	Nguyễn Văn Kỉnh	Alternate	Not	1916	1938	Sài Gòn City	—	Kinh	Male	
46	Lê Quốc Thân	New	Reelected	1919	1940	Hà Nam province	—	Kinh	Male	
47	Phan Trọng Tuệ	New	Reelected	1917	1934	Sơn Tây City	—	Kinh	Male	
—	Trương Chí Cương	Promoted	Not	1919	1936	Quảng Nam province	—	Kinh	Male	
—	Trần Độ	Promoted	Reelected	1923	1940	Thái Bình province	—	Kinh	Male	
—	Trần Văn Quang	Promoted	Not	1917	1936	Nghệ An province	Military science	Kinh	Male	
—	Võ Văn Kiệt	Promoted	Reelected	1922	1939	Vĩnh Long province	—	Kinh	Male	

=== Alternates ===
Alternates of the 3rd Central Committee of the Workers' Party of Vietnam
Rank	Name	2nd CC	4th CC	BY	PM	Birthplace	Education	Ethnicity	Gender	Ref.
1	Phạm Thái Bường	New	Not	1915	1938	Trà Vinh province	—	Kinh	Male	
2	Võ Văn Kiệt	New	Promoted	1922	1939	Vĩnh Long province	—	Kinh	Male	
3	Lê Toàn Thư	New	Not	1921	1940	Ninh Bình province	—	Kinh	Male	
4	Lê Quang Đạo	New	Member	1921	1940	Bắc Ninh province	—	Kinh	Male	
5	Trần Độ	New	Promoted	1923	1940	Thái Bình province	—	Kinh	Male	
6	Lý Ban	New	Not	1912	1930	Long An province	—	Kinh	Male	
7	Lê Liêm	New	Not	1922	1939	Hà Đông province	—	Kinh	Male	
8	Nguyễn Hữu Mai	New	Member	1914	1940	Quảng Trị province	Railway engineering	Kinh	Male	
9	Nguyễn Đôn	New	Not	1918	1938	Quảng Ngãi province	Military science	Kinh	Male	
10	Bùi Công Trừng	New	Not	1902	—	Thừa Thiên Huế province	Marxist studies	Kinh	Male	
11	Ngô Minh Loan	New	Not	1915	—	Nghệ An province	—	Kinh	Male	
12	Trần Quang Huy	New	Member	1922	—	Khánh Hòa province	—	Kinh	Male	
13	Trần Danh Tuyên	New	Not	1911	1937	Bắc Giang province	—	Kinh	Male	
14	Nguyễn Văn Lộc	New	Not	1914	1938	Hà Đông province	—	Kinh	Male	
15	Nguyễn Thanh Bình	New	Member	1918	1939	Bắc Ninh province	—	Kinh	Male	
16	Hoàng Tùng	New	Member	1920	1943	Hà Nam province	—	Kinh	Male	
17	Nguyễn Thọ Chân	New	Not	1922	1939	Hà Nội City	—	Kinh	Male	
18	Nguyễn Khai	New	Not					Kinh	Male	
19	Trần Văn Trà	New	Member	1919	1938	Quảng Ngãi province	—	Kinh	Male	
20	Nguyễn Trọng Vĩnh	New	Not	1916	1937	Thanh Hóa province	—	Kinh	Male	
21	Hoàng Văn Kiểu	New	Member	1921	1942	Lạng Sơn province	—	Tày	Male	
22	Hà Kế Tấn	New	Member	1912	1937	Hà Nội City	—	Kinh	Male	
23	Lê Hoàng	New	Not					Kinh	Male	
24	Lê Thành	New	Not	1922	1940	Thái Bình province	—	Kinh	Male	
25	Trần Quý Hai	New	Not	1913	1930	Quảng Ngãi province	Military science	Kinh	Male	
26	Nguyễn Khánh Toàn	New	Not	1905	1930	Nghệ An province	History	Kinh	Male	
27	Nguyễn Văn Vịnh	New	Not	1918	1942	Nam Định province	—	Kinh	Male	
28	Đinh Đức Thiện	New	Member	1914	1939	Nam Định province	Explosives engineering	Kinh	Male	
29	Nguyễn Hữu Khiếu	New	Member	1915	—	Quảng Trị province	—	Kinh	Male	
30	Ngô Thuyền	New	Not	1910	1939	Thanh Hóa province	—	Kinh	Male	
31	Đinh Thị Cẩn	New	Not	1920	—	Nghệ An province	—	Kinh	Female	
32	Trương Chí Cương	New	Promoted	1919	1936	Quảng Nam province	—	Kinh	Male	
33	Trần Văn Quang	New	Promoted	1917	1936	Nghệ An province	Military science	Kinh	Male	

== Bibliography ==
- Guan, Ang Cheng (2002). "Vietnam: Another Milestone and the Country Plods On". Southeast Asian Affairs. 2002. ISEAS–Yusof Ishak Institute: 345–356. JSTOR 27913216.
- Hung, Nguyen Manh (2000). "Vietnam in 1999: The Party's Choice". Asian Survey. 40 (1). University of California Press: 98–111. doi:10.2307/3021225. JSTOR 3021225.
- Vasavakul, Thaveeporn (1998). "Vietnam's One-Party Rule and Socialist Democracy?". Southeast Asian Affairs. ISEAS–Yusof Ishak Institute: 309–327. JSTOR 27912210.
- Thayer, Carlyle (2001). "Vietnam in 2000: Toward the Ninth Party Congress". Asian Survey. 41 (1). University of California Press: 81–89. doi:10.1525/as.2001.41.1.181. JSTOR 10.1525/as.2001.41.1.181.
