= List of recipients of the Gold Star Order =

This list is an incomplete list of the recipients of the Gold Star Order of Vietnam

== Vietnamese ==
Full name	birth year and death year	highest position	awarded year
Tôn Đức Thắng	1888-1980	President	1958
Nguyễn Thị Thập	1908-1996	Member of Central Party Committee, Vice Chairman of National Assembly	1985
Phạm Văn Đồng	1906-2000	Prime Minister, Member of Politburo	1990
Võ Nguyên Giáp	1911- 2013	General, Commander in chief of People's Army of Vietnam, Member of Politburo	1992
Võ Chí Công	1913-2011	Member of Politburo, President	1992
Nguyễn Hữu Thọ	1910-1996	Chairman of National Assembly, Acting President, Chairman of Vietnamese Fatherland Front	1993
Tố Hữu	1920-2002	Member of Politburo, Vice Prime Minister	
Văn Tiến Dũng	1917-2002	General, Minister of Defense, Member of Politburo	1995
Nguyễn Lương Bằng	1904-1979	Vice President	
Hoàng Quốc Việt	1905-1992	Head of Supreme People's Procuracy of Vietnam, Chairman of Vietnamese Fatherland Front	
Nguyễn Duy Trinh	1910-1985	Member of Politburo, Minister of Foreign Affairs	
Lê Đức Thọ	1911-1990	Member of Politburo, Head of the Central Organizing Committee	
Lê Thanh Nghị	1911-1989	Member of Politburo, Vice President	
Phạm Hùng	1912-1988	Member of Politburo, Prime Minister	
Lê Văn Lương	1912-1995	Member of Politburo, Head of the Central Organizing Committee	
Chu Huy Mân	1913-2006	General, Chairman of the General Political Department, Member of Politburo	
Nguyễn Chí Thanh	1914-1967	General, Chairman of the General Political Department, Member of Politburo	
Nguyễn Văn Linh	1915-1998	General Secretary	
Trần Quốc Hoàn	1916-1986	Member of Politburo, Minister of Public Security	
Đỗ Mười	1917-2018	General Secretary, Prime Minister, Member of Politburo	
Lê Đức Anh	1920-2019	General, President, Minister of Defense, Member of Politburo	
Võ Văn Kiệt	1922-2008	Prime Minister, Member of Politburo	1997
Lê Quang Đạo	1921-1999	Chairman of National Assembly, Chairman of Fatherland Front	2002
Song Hào	1917-2004	Colonel General, Chairman of the General Political Department, Secretary of Central Party	2003
Phạm Văn Xô	1910-2005	Secretary of Central Party, Vice Head of the Central Inspection Committee	2004
Xuân Thủy	1912-1985	Secretary of Central Party, Minister of Foreign Affairs	2005
Huỳnh Tấn Phát	1913-1989	President of Provisional Revolutionary Government of the Republic of South Vietnam, Chairman of Father Front	2005
Cù Huy Cận	1919-2005	Minister of Agricultural, Duty Minister of Cultural	
Trần Quốc Hương	1924-2020	Secretary of Central Party	2006
Trần Nam Trung	1912-2009	Colonel General, Inspector-General of the Government, Minister of Defense of Republic of South Vietnam (1969-1975).	2007
Hoàng Anh	1912-2016	Secretary of Central Party, Vice Prime Minister	2007
Lê Trọng Tấn	1914-1986	General, Duty Minister of Defense cum Chief of General staff	2007
Nguyễn Chánh	1914-1957	Vice Chief of General staff	2007
Đặng Việt Châu	1914-1987	Vice Prime Minister	2007
Võ Thúc Đồng	1914-2007	Minister of Agricultural	2007
Hoàng Văn Thái	1915-1986	General, Duty Minister of Defense, First Chief of General staff	2007
Phan Trọng Tuệ	1917-1991	Vice Prime Minister	2007
Nguyễn Đức Tâm	1920-2010	Member of Politburo, Head of the Central Commission of Organizing	2007
Mai Chí Thọ	1922-2007	Police General, Minister of Internal Affairs	2007
Nguyễn Cơ Thạch	1921-1998	Member of Politburo, Minister of Foreign Affairs	2007
Nguyễn Thanh Bình	1920-2010	Member of Politburo, Chief party of Hanoi	2007
Trần Kiên	1920-2003	Secretary of Central Party, Head of Central Commission of Inspection	2007
Nguyễn Văn Trân	1917-2018	Secretary of Central Party, Chief party of Hanoi	2007
Đồng Sỹ Nguyên	1923-2019	Member of Politburo, Vice Prime Minister	2007
Trần Hữu Dực	1920-2003	Vice Prime Minister	2007
Trần Quỳnh	1920-2005	Vice Prime Minister	2007
Nguyễn Côn	1917-2022	Vice Prime Minister	2007
Nguyễn Lam	1921-1990	Vice Prime Minister	2007
Trần Đức Lương	1937-2025	Member of Politburo, President	2007
Nguyễn Quyết	1922-2024	Vice Chairman of Council of State, General	2007
Đàm Quang Trung	1921-1995	Vice Chairman of Council of State, Colonel General	2007
Đoàn Khuê	1923-1998	Minister of Defense, General, Member of Politburo	2007
Hoàng Tùng	1920-2010	Secretary of Central Party, Head of Central Propaganda Committee	2007
Trần Quyết	1922-2010	Secretary of Central Party, Head of Supreme People's Procuracy	2007
Vũ Oanh	1924-2022	Member of Politburo, Head of Central Mobilize Committee	2007
Lê Khả Phiêu	1931-2020	General Secretary	2007
Phan Văn Đáng	1918-1997	Vice Chairman of National Assembly	2008
Lê Văn Hiến	1904-1997	Minister of Labour, Minister of Finance	2008
Nguyễn Khánh Toàn	1905-1993	Duty Minister of Education	2008
Phan Văn Khải	1933-2018	Prime Minister	2008
Trần Tử Bình	1907-1967	Secretary of Party's Committee of North Vietnam, Ambassador of Vietnam in China	
Hồ Tùng Mậu	1896-1961	Inspector-General of the Government	2008
Dương Quang Đông	1902-2003	Standing Member of Party's Committee of South Vietnam	2008
Nguyễn Văn Lộc (bộ trưởng)	1914-1979	Minister of Agricultural	2008
Lê Chưởng	1914-1973	Secretary of Party's Committee of Central Vietnam, Major General, Duty Minister of Education	2008
Trần Danh Tuyên	1911-1997	Member of Party's Committee of North Vietnam, Chief party of Hanoi	2008
Trần Quý Hai	1913-1985	Lieutenant General, Duty Minister of Defense	2008
Đinh Đức Thiện	1913-1987	Colonel General, Minister of Mechanics and Metallurgy, Minister of Oil and Gas	2008
Nguyễn Văn Tạo	1908-1970	Chairman of the Office of the Government	2009
Trần Văn Quang	1917-2013	Colonel General, Vice Chief of General staff, Duty Minister of Defense	2009
Đặng Quân Thụy	1928-	Lieutenant General, Vice Chairman of National Assembly	2009
Trần Đăng Ninh	1910-1955	Chairman of General Logistical Department, People's Army of Vietnam	2009
Nguyễn Thanh Sơn	1910-1996	Secretary of Party's Committee of South Vietnam, Duty Minister of Finance, Senior Colonel	2009
Hoàng Trường Minh	1922-1989	Vice Chairman of National Assembly, Head of the Committee on Ethnics	2010
Nguyễn Văn Tố	1889-1947	First Head of Standing Committee of National Assembly	2011
Tôn Quang Phiệt	1900-1973	Vice Head of Standing Committee of National Assembly	2011
Nguyễn Xiển	1917-1997	Vice Chairman of National Assembly, General Secretary of Socialist Party of Vietnam	2011
Nguyễn Xuân Linh	1909-1988	Secretary of Standing Committee of National Assembly	2011
Nghiêm Xuân Yêm	1913-2001	Vice Chairman of National Assembly, General Secretary of Democratic Party of Vietnam, Minister of Agricultural	2011
Nguyễn Phú Trọng	1944-2024	General Secretary of the Communist Party of Vietnam	2024
Nông Đức Mạnh	1940-	General Secretary of the Communist Party of Vietnam	2025
Nguyễn Tấn Dũng	1949-	Prime minister	2025

== Foreigners ==
Full name	birth year and death year	highest position	awarded year	Ref.
Leonid Ilyich Brezhnev	1906-1982	General Secretary of the Communist Party of the Soviet Union, Chairman of the Presidium of the Supreme Soviet	1980	
Alexei Nikolayevich Kosygin	1904-1980	Chairman of the Council of Ministers of the Soviet Union	1980	
Mikhail Andreyevich Suslov	1902-1982	Second Secretary of the Communist Party of the Soviet Union	1980	
Gustáv Husák	1913-1991	General Secretary of the Communist Party of Czechoslovakia and President	1983	
Losonczi Pál	1919-2005	Head of state of the Hungarian People's Republic	1984	
Indira Gandhi	1917–1984	Prime Minister of the Republic of India	1985 (posthumously)	
Jambyn Batmönkh	1926-1997	General Secretary of the Mongolian People's Revolutionary Party, President of the Mongolian People's Republic	1986	
Heng Samrin	1934-	General Secretary of the People's Republic of Kampuchea, President of the Cambodian People's Party	1986	
Kim Il Sung	1912-1994	President of the Korean People's Democratic Republic	1988	
Kaysone Phomvihane	1920-1992	President of the Lao People's Democratic Republic		
Khamtai Siphandon	1924-2025	President of the Lao People's Democratic Republic	1993	
Choummaly Sayasone	1936-	President of the Lao People's Democratic Republic	2006	
Fidel Castro	1926-2016	President of the Republic of Cuba		
Samane Vignaket	1927-2016	Chairman of the National Assembly of Laos	2007	
Sisavath Keobounphanh	1928-2020	Prime Minister of Laos	2007	
Bounnhang Vorachith	1937-	Vice President of the Lao People's Democratic Republic	2007	

== Sources ==
- Danh sách cá nhân, tập thể được trao tặng Huân chương Sao Vàng
