= 2nd Central Committee of the Workers' Party of Vietnam =

Central Committee of the Workers' Party of Vietnam

2nd Central Committee
- Symbol of the Communist Party of Vietnam

19 February 1951 – 10 September 1960 (9 years, 204 days) Overview
- Type: Central Committee of the Workers' Party of Vietnam
- Election: 2nd National Congress

Leadership
- General Secretary: Trường Chinh (February 1951-October 1956); Hồ Chí Minh (October 1956-September 1960)
- Chairman: Hồ Chí Minh
- Politburo: 7 members 1 alternate
- Secretariat: 3 members

Members
- Total: 19 members

Alternates
- Total: 10 alternates

The 2nd Central Committee of the Workers' Party of Vietnam (WPV) was elected at the 2nd WPV National Congress. It elected the 2nd Politburo and the 2nd Secretariat.

== Plenums ==
The Central Committee (CC) is not a permanent institution. Instead, it convenes plenary sessions between party congresses. When the CC is not in session, decision-making powers are delegated to its internal bodies; that is, the Politburo and the Secretariat. None of these organs are permanent bodies either; typically, they convene several times a month.

Plenary Sessions of the 2nd Central Committee
Plenum	Date	Length	Ref.
1st Plenary Session	13 March 1951	1 day	
2nd Plenary Session	27 September – October 1951	Not made public.	
3rd Plenary Session	22–28 April 1952	7 days	
4th Plenary Session	25–30 January 1953	6 days	
5th Plenary Session	14 November 1953	1 day	
6th Plenary Session	15–18 July 1954	4 days	
7th Plenary Session	3–12 March 1955	10 days	
8th Plenary Session	13–20 August 1955	8 days	
9th Plenary Session	24 April 1956	1 day	
10th Plenary Session	September – 29 October 1956	1 day	
11th Plenary Session	3 December 1956	1 day	
12th Plenary Session	March 1957	Not made public.	
13th Plenary Session	19–21 February 1957	Not made public.	
14th Plenary Session	January 1958	Not made public.	
15th Plenary Session	5 January 1959	1 day	
16th Plenary Session	April 1959	Not made public.	
17th Plenary Session	October 1959	Not made public.	

== Composition ==
=== Members ===
Members of the 2nd Central Committee of the Workers' Party of Vietnam
Listing	Name	1st CC	3rd CC	BY	PM	Birthplace	Ethnicity	Gender	Ref.
1	Hồ Chí Minh	Old	Reelected	1890	1930	Nghệ An province	Kinh	Male	
2	Trường Chinh	Old	Reelected	1907	1930	Nam Định province	Kinh	Male	
3	Lê Duẩn	Old	Reelected	1907	1930	Quảng Trị Province	Kinh	Male	
4	Phạm Văn Đồng	Alternate	Reelected	1906	1930	Quảng Ngãi province	Kinh	Male	
5	Võ Nguyễn Giáp	Old	Reelected	1911	1930	Quảng Bình province	Kinh	Male	
6	Lê Đức Thọ	Old	Reelected	1911	1930	Nam Định province	Kinh	Male	
7	Nguyễn Chí Thanh	Old	Reelected	1914	1937	Thừa Thiên Huế province	Kinh	Male	
8	Nguyễn Lương Bằng	Old	Reelected	1904	1930	Hải Dương province	Kinh	Male	
9	Hoàng Quốc Việt	Old	Reelected	1905	1930	Bắc Ninh province	Kinh	Male	
10	Chu Văn Tấn	Old	Reelected	1909	1936	Lạng Sơn province	Kinh	Male	
11	Tôn Đức Thắng	New	Reelected	1888	1930	Long Xuyên province	Kinh	Male	
12	Lê Văn Lương	Alternate	Reelected	1912	1930	Bắc Ninh province	Kinh	Male	
13	Trần Đăng Ninh	Alternate	Died	1910	1936	Hà Tây province	Kinh	Male	
14	Hoàng Văn Hoan	Old	Reelected	1905	1930	Nghệ An province	Kinh	Male	
15	Trần Quốc Hoàn	New	Reelected	1916	1934	Nghệ An province	Kinh	Male	
16	Lê Thanh Nghị	New	Reelected	1911	1930	Hải Dương province	Kinh	Male	
17	Nguyễn Duy Trinh	New	Reelected	1910	1930	Nghệ An province	Kinh	Male	
18	Phạm Hùng	New	Reelected	1912	1930	Vĩnh Long province	Kinh	Male	
19	Ung Văn Khiêm	New	Reelected	1910	1930	Long Xuyên province	Kinh	Male	
—	Trần Hữu Dực	Promoted	Reelected	1910	1930	Quảng Trị province	Kinh	Male	
—	Tố Hữu	Promoted	Reelected	1920	1938	Thừa Thiên Huế province	Kinh	Male	
—	Trần Nam Trung	Promoted	Reelected	1912	1931	Quảng Ngãi province	Kinh	Male	
—	Đỗ Mười	Promoted	Reelected	1917	1939	Hà Nội City	Kinh	Male	
—	Bùi Quang Tạo	Promoted	Reelected	1913	—	Thái Bình province	Kinh	Male	
—	Nguyễn Thị Thập	Promoted	Reelected	1908	1931	Mỹ Tho province	Kinh	Female	
—	Xuân Thuỷ	Promoted	Reelected	1912	1941	Hà Đông City	Kinh	Male	

=== Alternates ===
Alternates of the 2nd Central Committee of the Workers' Party of Vietnam
Listing	Name	1st CC	3rd CC	BY	PM	Birthplace	Ethnicity	Gender	Ref.
1	Nguyễn Khang	New	Member	1919	1936	Thái Bình province	Kinh	Male	
2	Nguyễn Văn Trân	New	Member	1917	1935	Bắc Ninh province	Kinh	Male	
3	Hà Huy Giáp	New	Member	1908	1930	Hà Tĩnh province	Kinh	Male	
4	Hồ Viết Thắng	New	Not	1918	1939	Nghệ An province	Kinh	Male	
5	Văn Tiến Dũng	New	Member	1917	1937	Hà Nội City	Kinh	Male	
6	Tố Hữu	New	Promoted	1920	1938	Thừa Thiên Huế province	Kinh	Male	
7	Hồ Tùng Mậu	New	Died	1896	1930	Nghệ An province	Kinh	Male	
8	Nguyễn Văn Kỉnh	New	Member	1916	1938	Sài Gòn City	Kinh	Male	
9	Nguyễn Chánh	New	Died	1914	1931	Quảng Ngãi province	Kinh	Male	
10	Hoàng Anh	New	Member	1912	1937	Thừa Thiên Huế province	Kinh	Male	
11	Trần Hữu Dực	New	Promoted	1910	1930	Quảng Trị province	Kinh	Male	
12	Bùi Quang Tạo	New	Promoted	1913	—	Thái Bình province	Kinh	Male	
13	Xuân Thuỷ	New	Promoted	1912	1941	Hà Đông City	Kinh	Male	
14	Trần Nam Trung	New	Promoted	1912	1931	Quảng Ngãi province	Kinh	Male	
15	Nguyễn Thị Thập	New	Promoted	1908	1931	Mỹ Tho province	Kinh	Female	
16	Đỗ Mười	New	Promoted	1917	1939	Hà Nội City	Kinh	Male	

== Bibliography ==
- Guan, Ang Cheng (2002). "Vietnam: Another Milestone and the Country Plods On". Southeast Asian Affairs. 2002. ISEAS–Yusof Ishak Institute: 345–356. JSTOR 27913216.
- Hung, Nguyen Manh (2000). "Vietnam in 1999: The Party's Choice". Asian Survey. 40 (1). University of California Press: 98–111. doi:10.2307/3021225. JSTOR 3021225.
- Vasavakul, Thaveeporn (1998). "Vietnam's One-Party Rule and Socialist Democracy?". Southeast Asian Affairs. ISEAS–Yusof Ishak Institute: 309–327. JSTOR 27912210.
- Thayer, Carlyle (2001). "Vietnam in 2000: Toward the Ninth Party Congress". Asian Survey. 41 (1). University of California Press: 81–89. doi:10.1525/as.2001.41.1.181. JSTOR 10.1525/as.2001.41.1.181.
