= 4th Central Committee of the Communist Party of Vietnam =

Central Committee of the Communist Party of Vietnam

4th Central Committee
- Symbol of the Communist Party of Vietnam

20 December 1976 – 31 March 1982 (5 years, 101 days) Overview
- Type: Central Committee of the Communist Party of Vietnam
- Election: 4th National Congress

Leadership
- General Secretary: Lê Duẩn
- Politburo: 14 members 3 alternates
- Secretariat: 9 members

Members
- Total: 101 members

Alternates
- Total: 32 alternates

The 4th Central Committee of the Communist Party of Vietnam (CPV) was elected at the 4th CPV National Congress. It elected the 4th Politburo and the 4th Secretariat.

== Plenums ==
The Central Committee (CC) is not a permanent institution. Instead, it convenes plenary sessions between party congresses. When the CC is not in session, decision-making powers are delegated to its internal bodies; that is, the Politburo and the Secretariat. None of these organs are permanent bodies either; typically, they convene several times a month.

Plenary Sessions of the 4th Central Committee
Plenum	Date	Length	Ref.
1st Plenary Session	20 December 1976	1 day	
2nd Plenary Session	21 June 1977	1 day	
3rd Plenary Session	January 1978	Not made public.	
4th Plenary Session	27 July 1978	1 day	
5th Plenary Session	December 1978	Not made public.	
6th Plenary Session	26 September 1979	1 day	
7th Plenary Session	March 1980	Not made public.	
8th Plenary Session	4–10 September 1980	7 days	
9th Plenary Session	3–10 December 1980	8 days	
10th Plenary Session	9 January 1981	1 day	
11th Plenary Session	7–16 December 1981	10 days	
12th Plenary Session	1 March 1982	1 day	

== Composition ==
=== Members ===
Members of the 4th Central Committee of the Communist Party of Vietnam
Rank	Name	3rd CC	5th CC	BY	PM	Birthplace	Education	Ethnicity	Gender	Ref.
1	Lê Duẩn	Old	Reelected	1907	1930	Quảng Trị Province	—	Kinh	Male	
2	Tôn Đức Thắng	Old	Not	1888	1930	Long Xuyên province	—	Kinh	Male	
3	Lê Thanh Nghị	Old	Reelected	1911	1930	Hải Dương province	—	Kinh	Male	
4	Nguyễn Lương Bằng	Old	Not	1904	1930	Hải Dương province	—	Kinh	Male	
5	Phạm Văn Đồng	Old	Reelected	1906	1930	Quảng Ngãi province	—	Kinh	Male	
6	Nguyễn Duy Trinh	Old	Reelected	1910	1930	Nghệ An province	—	Kinh	Male	
7	Xuân Thuỷ	Old	Not	1912	1941	Hà Đông City	—	Kinh	Male	
8	Hoàng Văn Thái	Old	Reelected	1915	1938	Thái Bình province	Military science	Kinh	Male	
9	Võ Nguyễn Giáp	Old	Reelected	1911	1930	Quảng Bình province	—	Kinh	Male	
10	Trần Quốc Hoàn	Old	Reelected	1916	1934	Nghệ An province	—	Kinh	Male	
11	Lê Quang Đạo	Alternate	Reelected	1921	1940	Bắc Ninh province	—	Kinh	Male	
12	Lê Văn Lương	Old	Reelected	1912	1930	Bắc Ninh province	—	Kinh	Male	
13	Chu Huy Mân	Old	Reelected	1913	1930	Nghệ An province	Military science	Kinh	Male	
14	Nguyễn Đức Thuận	New	Reelected	1916	1937	Nam Hà province	—	Kinh	Male	
15	Nguyễn Đức Tâm	New	Reelected	1920	1944	Thái Bình province	—	Kinh	Male	
16	Đỗ Mười	Old	Reelected	1917	1939	Hà Nội City	—	Kinh	Male	
17	Trần Nam Trung	Old	Not	1912	1931	Quảng Ngãi province	Military science	Kinh	Male	
18	Lê Đức Thọ	Old	Reelected	1911	1930	Nam Định province	—	Kinh	Male	
19	Văn Tiến Dũng	Old	Reelected	1917	1937	Hà Nội City	—	Kinh	Male	
20	Nguyễn Lam	Old	Reelected	1922	1943	Hà Nam province	—	Kinh	Male	
21	Đồng Sĩ Nguyên	New	Reelected	1923	1938	Quảng Bình province	Military science	Kinh	Male	
22	Đàm Quang Trung	New	Reelected	1921	1939	Cao Bằng province	Military science	Tày	Male	
23	Lê Việt Thắng	New	Reelected					Kinh	Male	
24	Tố Hữu	Old	Reelected	1920	1938	Thừa Thiên Huế province	—	Kinh	Male	
25	Nguyễn Quyết	New	Reelected	1922	1940	Hưng Yên province	—	Kinh	Male	
26	Võ Chí Công	Old	Reelected	1912	1935	Đà Nẵng City	—	Kinh	Male	
27	Trần Sâm	New	Not	1918	1939	Quảng Trị province	Military science	Kinh	Male	
28	Phan Ngọc Sến	New	Not	1919	1946	Bạc Liêu provinc€	—	Kinh	Male	
29	Lê Văn Hiền	New	Reelected					Kinh	Male	
30	Nguyễn Thị Thập	Old	Not	1908	1931	Mỹ Tho province	—	Kinh	Female	
31	Vũ Ngọc Linh	New	Reelected	1920	1943	Bắc Ninh province	—	Kinh	Male	
32	Lê Văn Phẩm	New	Reelected	1922	—	Tiền Giang province	—	Kinh	Male	
33	Trần Hữu Dực	Old	Not	1910	1930	Quảng Trị province	—	Kinh	Male	
34	Nguyễn Hữu Mai	Alternate	Not	1914	1940	Quảng Trị province	Railway engineering	Kinh	Male	
35	Đoàn Khuê	New	Reelected	1923	—	Quảng Trị province	Military science	Kinh	Male	
36	Nguyễn Thanh Bình	Alternate	Reelected	1918	1939	Bắc Ninh province	—	Kinh	Male	
37	Bùi Quang Tạo	Old	Not	1913	—	Thái Bình province	—	Kinh	Male	
38	Ngô Duy Đông	New	Reelected	1917	1939	Thái Bình province	—	Kinh	Male	
39	Song Hào	Old	Reelected	1917	1939	Nam Định province	—	Kinh	Male	
40	Nguyễn Cơ Thạch	New	Reelected	1921	1943	Nam Định province	—	Kinh	Male	
41	Vũ Lập	New	Reelected	1924	—	Cao Bằng province	—	Tày	Male	
42	Hoàng Quốc Việt	Old	Not	1905	1930	Bắc Ninh province	—	Kinh	Male	
43	Võ Văn Kiệt	Old	Reelected	1922	1939	Vĩnh Long province	—	Kinh	Male	
44	Lê Hiến Mai	Old	Not	1918	1939	Sơn Tây City	—	Kinh	Male	
45	Lê Trọng Tấn	New	Reelected	1914	1945	Hà Đông City	Military science	Kinh	Male	
46	Hoàng Trường Minh	New	Reelected	1922	1945	Bắc Kạn province	Agricultural economics	Tày	Male	
47	Trần Lê	New	Reelected	1921	1943	Quảng Nam province	—	Kinh	Male	
48	Trường Chinh	Old	Reelected	1907	1930	Nam Định province	—	Kinh	Male	
49	Hoàng Cầm	New	Reelected	1920	1947	Hà Đông City	—	Kinh	Male	
50	Nguyễn Thành Lê	New	Not	1920	1945	Hà Nam province	—	Kinh	Male	
51	Nguyễn Xuân Hữu	New	Reelected	1923	1946	Quảng Nam province	—	Kinh	Male	
52	Hoàng Văn Kiểu	Alternate	Not	1921	1942	Lạng Sơn province	—	Tày	Male	
53	Bùi Phùng	New	Reelected	1920	1946	Bắc Ninh province	Military science	Kinh	Male	
54	Đinh Đức Thiện	Alternate	Not	1914	1939	Nam Định province	Explosives engineering	Kinh	Male	
55	Trần Quang Huy	Alternate	Not	1922	—	Khánh Hòa province	—	Kinh	Male	
56	Lê Đức Anh	New	Reelected	1920	1938	Thừa Thiên Huế province	—	Kinh	Male	
57	Nguyễn Hữu Khiếu	Alternate	Not	1915	—	Quảng Trị province	—	Kinh	Male	
58	Nguyễn Vịnh	New	Reelected					Kinh	Male	
59	Trần Đông	New	Reelected	1925	1946	Hải Phòng City	—	Kinh	Male	
60	Phan Trọng Tuệ	Old	Not	1917	1934	Sơn Tây City	—	Kinh	Male	
61	Trần Văn Long	New	Reelected					Kinh	Male	
62	Võ Thúc Đồng	Old	Not	1914	1930	Nghệ An province	—	Kinh	Male	
63	Trần Văn Trà	Alternate	Not	1919	1938	Quảng Ngãi province	—	Kinh	Male	
64	Lê Quang Chữ	New	Reelected	1922	—	Quảng Bình province	—	Kinh	Male	
65	Nguyễn Văn Chí	Old	Reelected	1945	1965	Đà Nẵng City	Economic Management	Kinh	Male	
66	Đỗ Văn Nguyện	New	Not	1927	—	Tây Ninh province	—	Kinh	Male	
67	Trần Kiên	New	Reelected	1920	1945	Quảng Ngãi province	—	Kinh	Male	
68	Vũ Đình Liệu	New	Reelected	1919	1946	Nam Định province	—	Kinh	Male	
69	Hoàng Minh Thi	New	Not	1922	1945	Quảng Ngãi province	Military science	Kinh	Male	
70	Phạm Hùng	Old	Reelected	1912	1930	Vĩnh Long province	—	Kinh	Male	
71	Hoàng Anh	Old	Not	1912	1937	Thừa Thiên Huế province	—	Kinh	Male	
72	Lê Quốc Thân	Old	Not	1919	1940	Hà Nam province	—	Kinh	Male	
73	Trần Quỳnh	New	Reelected	1920	1945	Quảng Trị province	—	Kinh	Male	
74	Hà Kế Tấn	Alternate	Not	1912	1937	Hà Nội City	—	Kinh	Male	
75	Đặng Quốc Bảo	New	Not	1927	1945	Nam Định province	—	Kinh	Male	
76	La Lâm Gia	New	Reelected	1919	1947	Bạc Liêu province	—	Kinh	Male	
77	Nguyễn Ngọc Trìu	New	Reelected	1926	1946	Thái Bình province	Political theory	Kinh	Male	
78	Hà Thị Quế	Old	Not	1921	1941	Ninh Bình province	—	Kinh	Female	
79	Nguyễn Côn	Old	Reelected	1916	1937	Nghệ An province	—	Kinh	Male	
80	Nguyễn Thị Định	New	Reelected	1920	1938	Bến Tre province	—	Kinh	Female	
81	Lê Quang Hoà	New	Not	1914	1939	Hưng Yên province	—	Kinh	Male	
82	Trần Văn Sớm	New	Reelected	1918	1936	Bạc Liêu province	—	Kinh	Male	
83	Trần Quyết	New	Reelected	1922	1943	Hà Nam province	—	Kinh	Male	
84	Mai Chí Thọ	New	Reelected	1922	1939	Nam Định province	—	Kinh	Male	
85	Đặng Thí	New	Reelected	1921	1938	Quảng Trị province	—	Kinh	Male	
86	Bùi San	New	Reelected	1914	1930	Thừa Thiên Huế province	—	Tày	Male	
87	Phan Văn Đáng	Old	Not	1918	1939	Vĩnh Long province	—	Kinh	Male	
88	Trần Văn Hiển	New	Not	1922		Sơn Tây City		Kinh	Male	
89	Võ Văn Thạnh	New	Not					Kinh	Male	
90	Phạm Văn Kiết	New	Not	1929	1945	Bạc Liêu province	—	Kinh	Male	
91	Trần Quốc Hương	New	Reelected	1924	1943	Hà Nam province	—	Kinh	Male	
92	Tạ Hồng Thanh	New	Not					Kinh	Male	
93	Nguyễn Thị Bạch Tuyết	New	Not	1925	—	Long An province	—	Kinh	Female	
94	Trần Độ	Old	Reelected	1923	1940	Thái Bình province	—	Kinh	Male	
95	Nguyễn Quang Lâm	New	Not	1919	1946	Quảng Nam province	—	Kinh	Male	
96	Nguyễn Thành Thơ	New	Not	1925	1930	Cần Thơ province	—	Kinh	Male	
97	Nguyễn Văn Linh	New	Reelected	1915	1936	Hưng Yên province	—	Kinh	Male	
98	Đặng Hữu Khiêm	New	Not					Kinh	Male	
99	Vũ Tuân	New	Not	1922	—	Hải Dương province	—	Kinh	Male	
100	Hoàng Tùng	Alternate	Reelected	1920	1943	Hà Nam province	—	Kinh	Male	
101	Nguyễn Thị Như	New	Reelected	1928	—	Hà Nội City	—	Kinh	Female	
—	Hoàng Minh Thảo	Promoted	Not	1921	1945	Hưng Yên province	—	Kinh	Male	
—	Đào Duy Tùng	Promoted	Reelected	1924	1945	Phúc Yên City	—	Kinh	Male	

=== Alternates ===
Alternates of the 4th Central Committee of the Communist Party of Vietnam
Rank	Name	3rd CC	5th CC	BY	PM	Birthplace	Education	Ethnicity	Gender	Ref.
1	Vũ Oanh	New	Member	1924	1941	Hải Hưng province	—	Kinh	Male	
2	Nguyễn Văn Chính	New	Member	1924	1946	Hồ Chí Minh City	—	Kinh	Male	
3	Đào Duy Tùng	New	Promoted	1924	1945	Phúc Yên City	—	Kinh	Male	
4	Lương Văn Nghĩa	New	Not					Kinh	Male	
5	Trần Hanh	New	Not	1932	1950	Nam Định province	—	Kinh	Male	
6	Vũ Thị Hồng	New	Member					Kinh	Female	
7	Cao Đăng Chiếm	New	Member	1921	1946	Mỹ Tho province	—	Kinh	Male	
8	Nguyễn Chấn	New	Alternate	1929	—	Bắc Ninh province	—	Kinh	Male	
9	Nguyễn Tường Lân	New	Not	1921	—	Thái Bình province	Transportation engineering	Kinh	Male	
10	Trần Hữu Dư	New	Not					Kinh	Male	
11	Trần Phương	New	Member	1927	1946	Hưng Yên province	Economics	Kinh	Male	
12	Lê Khắc	New	Member	1916	1947	Hà Nội City	—	Kinh	Male	
13	Nguyễn Đình Tứ	New	Member	1932	—	Nghệ Tĩnh province	Mathematics & physics	Kinh	Male	
14	Trần Lâm	New	Member	1911	—	Hà Nội City	—	Kinh	Male	
15	Hoàng Minh Thảo	New	Promoted	1921	1945	Hưng Yên province	—	Kinh	Male	
16	Lê Ngọc Hiền	New	Member	1928	1945	Hà Đông City	—	Kinh	Male	
17	Lê Văn Tri	New	Not	1920	—	Quảng Bình province	—	Kinh	Male	
18	Hoàng Thế Thiện	New	Not	1922	1945	Hải Phòng City	—	Kinh	Male	
19	Đặng Vũ Hiệp	New	Member	1928	—	Hưng Yên province	—	Kinh	Male	
20	Đỗ Chính	New	Member	1926	1946	Hưng Yên province	—	Kinh	Male	
21	Trần Vỹ	New	Member	1921	1945	Hưng Yên province	—	Kinh	Male	
22	Nguyễn Ngọc Cừ	New	Not					Kinh	Male	
23	Nguyễn Hữu Thụ	New	Member	1926	—	Hà Đông City	—	Kinh	Male	
24	Hoàng Văn Hiều	New	Not	1931	—	Thanh Hoá province	—	Kinh	Male	
25	Trương Văn Kiện	New	Not	1929	—	Nghệ An province	—	Kinh	Male	
26	Bùi Thanh Khiết	New	Member	1924	—	Sa Đéc province	—	Kinh	Male	
27	Nguyễn Đáng	New	Member	1925	1947	Trà Vinh province	—	Kinh	Male	
28	Lê Phước Thọ	New	Member	1927	1949	Cà Mau province	—	Kinh	Male	
29	Hồ Nghinh	New	Member	1915	1946	Quảng Nam province	—	Kinh	Male	
30	Nguyễn Văn Sĩ	New	Member	1930	—	Gia Lai province	Medicine	Ra-glai	Male	
31	Y Một	New	Member	1939	1957	Kon Tum province	—	Giẻ Triêng	Female	
32	Y Ngông Niêk Đăm	New	Member	1922	—	Đắk Lắk province	Medicine	Kinh	Male	

== Bibliography ==
- Guan, Ang Cheng (2002). "Vietnam: Another Milestone and the Country Plods On". Southeast Asian Affairs. 2002. ISEAS–Yusof Ishak Institute: 345–356. JSTOR 27913216.
- Hung, Nguyen Manh (2000). "Vietnam in 1999: The Party's Choice". Asian Survey. 40 (1). University of California Press: 98–111. doi:10.2307/3021225. JSTOR 3021225.
- Vasavakul, Thaveeporn (1998). "Vietnam's One-Party Rule and Socialist Democracy?". Southeast Asian Affairs. ISEAS–Yusof Ishak Institute: 309–327. JSTOR 27912210.
- Thayer, Carlyle (2001). "Vietnam in 2000: Toward the Ninth Party Congress". Asian Survey. 41 (1). University of California Press: 81–89. doi:10.1525/as.2001.41.1.181. JSTOR 10.1525/as.2001.41.1.181.
