= 1st Central Committee of the Indochinese Communist Party =

Central Committee of the Indochinese Communist Party

1st Central Committee
- Symbol of the Communist Party of Vietnam

31 March 1935 – 19 February 1951 (15 years, 325 days) Overview
- Type: Central Committee of the Indochinese Communist Party
- Election: 1st National Congress

Leadership
- General Secretary: Lê Hồng Phong; Hà Huy Tập; Nguyễn Văn Cừ; Trường Chinh

The 1st Central Committee of the Indochinese Communist Party was in session from 1935 to 1951.

== Plenums ==
The Central Committee (CC) is not a permanent institution; it convenes plenary sessions between party congresses. When not in session, its decision-making powers are delegated to internal bodies—the Politburo and the Secretariat. None of these organs are permanent bodies either; typically, they convene several times a month.

Plenary Sessions of the 1st Central Committee
Plenum	Date	Length	Ref.
1st Plenary Session	April 1935	1 day	
2nd Plenary Session	26 July 1936	1 day	
3rd Plenary Session	26 July 1936	1 day	
4th Plenary Session	25 August – 4 September 1937	11 days	
5th Plenary Session	29–30 March 1938	6 days	
6th Plenary Session	2, 7–8 November 1939	1 day	
7th Plenary Session	6–9 November 1940	4 days	
8th Plenary Session	10–19 May 1941	10 days	

== Composition ==
=== Members ===
Members of the 1st Central Committee of the Indochinese Communist Party
Name	2nd CC	Birth	Death	PM	Birthplace	Ethnicity	Gender	Ref.
Vũ Anh	Not	?	?	?	?	Kinh	Male	
Nguyễn Lương Bằng	Reelected	1904	1979	1930	Hải Dương province	Kinh	Male	
Trường Chinh	Reelected	1907	1988	1930	Nam Định province	Kinh	Male	
Nguyễn Văn Cừ	Not	1912	1941	1930	Bắc Ninh province	Kinh	Male	
Nguyễn Chí Diểu	Not	1911	1939	1930	Thừa Thiên Huế province	Kinh	Male	
Lê Duẩn	Reelected	1907	1986	1930	Quảng Trị Province	Kinh	Male	
Nguyễn Văn Dựt	Not	?	?	?	?	Kinh	Male	
Võ Nguyên Giáp	Reelected	1911	2013	1930	Quảng Bình province	Kinh	Male	
Võ Nguyên Hiến	Not	1890	1975	1930	Nghệ An province	Kinh	Male	
Hoàng Văn Hoan	Reelected	1905	1991	1930	Nghệ An province	Kinh	Male	
Nguyễn Thị Minh Khai	Not	1910	1941	1930	Nghệ An province	Kinh	Female	
Phùng Chí Kiên	Not	1901	1941	1930	Nghệ An province	Kinh	Male	
Phan Đăng Lưu	Not	1902	1941	1930	Nghệ An province	Kinh	Male	
Hồ Chí Minh	Reelected	1890	1969	1930	Nghệ An province	Kinh	Male	
Hoàng Văn Nọn	Not	1905	1968	1930	Cao Bằng province	Kinh	Male	
Lê Hồng Phong	Not	1902	1942	1930	Nghệ An province	Kinh	Male	
Chu Văn Tấn	Reelected	1909	1984	1936	Lạng Sơn province	Nùng	Male	
Võ Văn Tần	Not	1894	1941	1930	Chợ Lớn province	Kinh	Male	
Hà Huy Tập	Not	1906	1941	1930	Hà Tĩnh province	Kinh	Male	
Đinh Thanh	Not	?	?	?	?	Kinh	Male	
Nguyễn Chí Thanh	Reelected	1914	1967	1937	Thừa Thiên Huế province	Kinh	Male	
Lê Đức Thọ	Reelected	1911	1990	1930	Nam Định province	Kinh	Male	
Hoàng Văn Thụ	Not	1909	1944	1930	Lạng Sơn province	Tày	Male	
Ngô Tuân	Not	?	?	?	?	Kinh	Male	
Hoàng Quốc Việt	Reelected	1905	1992	1930	Bắc Ninh province	Kinh	Male	
Thẩu Xỉ	Not	?	?	?	?	Lao	Male	

=== Alternates ===
Alternates of the 1st Central Committee of the Indochinese Communist Party
Name	2nd CC	Birth	Death	PM	Birthplace	Ethnicity	Gender	Ref.
Nguyễn Lương Bằng	Promoted	1904	1979	1930	Hải Dương province	Kinh	Male	
Phạm Văn Đồng	Member	1906	2000	1930	Quảng Ngãi province	Kinh	Male	
Lê Văn Lương	Member	1912	1995	1930	Bắc Ninh province	Kinh	Male	
Trần Đăng Ninh	Member	1910	1955	1936	Hà Tây province	Kinh	Male	
Lê Đức Thọ	Promoted	1911	1990	1930	Nam Định province	Kinh	Male	

== Bibliography ==
- Van, Canh Nguyen; Cooper, Earle (1983). Vietnam under Communism, 1975–1982. Hoover Press. ISBN 9780817978518.
