= Trần Đăng Ninh =

Chairman of the Central Inspection Commission
- In office October 1948 – late 1950
- Preceded by: Office established
- Succeeded by: Hồ Tùng Mậu

Personal details
- Born: Nguyễn Tuấn Đáng; 1910 Ứng Hòa, Hà Đông, Tonkin (French protectorate)
- Died: 1955 (aged 44–45) Hà Nội, Democratic Republic of Vietnam
- Party: Communist Party of Vietnam
- Awards: Gold Star Order (posthumously)
- Nickname: Bao Gong of Vietnam

Military service
- Allegiance: Democratic Republic of Vietnam
- Branch/service: People's Army of Vietnam
- Rank: General
- Battles/wars: First Indochina War; Battle of Đông Khê

Trần Đăng Ninh (1910 – 6 October 1955) was a Vietnamese revolutionary and senior official in the People's Army of Vietnam. He was a former Secretary of the Northern Party Committee (Tonkin Party Committee, Xứ uỷ Bắc Kỳ). Trần Đăng Ninh was the first Chairman of the Central Inspection Commission of the Communist Party of Vietnam, and the first chairman of the General Department of Supply (now General Department of Logistics) of the People's Army of Vietnam from 1950 until his death in 1955. In 2003 he was awarded Vietnam's Gold Star Medal.

== Early life ==
Trần Đăng Ninh was born in 1910 as Nguyễn Tuấn Đáng in the hamlet of Quảng Nguyên, Quảng Phú Cầu commune, Ứng Hòa District of Hà Tây Province (now part of Hanoi), where he completed primary school. Rather than remaining a serf tied to the land, he moved to Hanoi where he worked in the Lê Văn Tân Printworks.

== Party work and generalship ==
Trần Đăng Ninh was attracted by the ideals of a Marxist revolution and joined the Indochinese Communist Party in 1936. In 1939 he became a member of the Party's Hanoi Committee, and in 1940 became a member of the Northern Party Committee (Tonkin Party Committee, Xứ uỷ Bắc Kỳ). In November 1940, he participated in the 7th Conference of the Central Committee of the Party. In May 1941, at the 8th Conference of the Central Committee held in the forest near Pác Bó, he was elected an alternate member of the Central Committee of the Party. In July 1941, he became Secretary of the Northern Party Committee.

Later in 1941, Trần Đăng Ninh was arrested by the Vichy French and sentenced to twenty years in prison. He was first sent to Hỏa Lò Prison in Hanoi, but as a problem prisoner he was transferred to Son La Prison at the end of 1942. There, he was active in the Party's secret organization in the prison, participating in political and military training for political prisoners. In March 1943, he escaped from Son La Prison along with Nguyễn Lương Bằng, Nguyễn Văn Trân and Lưu Đức Hiểu. He returned to work for the Standing Committee of the Northern Party Committee. But in September 1943, he was rearrested and again sent to Hỏa Lò Prison. In March 1945, he escaped a second time in a large prison-break of over a hundred political prisoners. After that, Trần Đăng Ninh was appointed as a member of the Tonkin Revolutionary Military Committee, and put in charge of the Hoàng Hoa Thám battlefield (i.e., Bắc Sơn – Võ Nhai base area).

In August 1945, Hồ Chí Minh sent Trần Đăng Ninh to the Việt Minh General Committee, to join the National Uprising Committee, in which capacity he attended the National Assembly at Tân Trào, Sơn Dương. He was then assigned to General Giáp. Trần Đăng Ninh liberated the town of Thái Nguyên, and provided the protection detail that accompanied Hồ Chí Minh's triumphal entrance into Hanoi in September 1945.

In 1947 he was appointed as the Party's Chairman of the Central Inspection Commission, and served as a deputy inspector in the Government Inspectorate from December 1949 to February 1951.

In 1950, he was appointed a member of the Party's Military Commission and specifically made head of the military's General Department of Supply (now General Department of Logistics, Cục Hậu cần). He was also charged with heading the Party's Campaign Supply Committee. He also accompanied Hồ Chí Minh on a secret mission to China in 1950 to establish diplomatic relations and request China's support in Vietnam's resistance war against France.

During 1952–1953 he developed the supply policy of "mobilize logistics in place", in other words to develop local labor and food resources from areas near the front. This reduced both food consumption and transport labor.

=== Death ===
Trần Đăng Ninh suffered from malaria and intestinal problems brought on by his time in prison. In September 1953 he fell ill and was originally treated at the Trần Quốc Toản Clinic (now Military Hospital 354) in Mỹ Yên, Đại Từ District. By December he was unable to attend the Politburo Conference in Tỉn Keo. In September 1954 he was taken to China, and then on to the Soviet Union for medical treatment. In June 1955 he returned home and he died in Hanoi on 6 October 1955.

== Commemoration ==
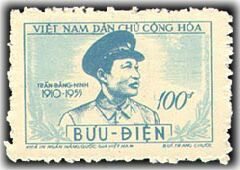
1956 stamp honoring Trần Đăng Ninh

- Trần Đăng Ninh's name was given to a street in Hanoi, a street and a ward in the city of Nam Định and a street in the city of Điện Biên Phủ.
- In July 1956, the Democratic Republic of Vietnam Post Office issued a set of four stamps, with his portrait, commemorating his work.
- A secondary school in Nam Định and the high school in Hoa Son commune, Ứng Hòa District, are named after him.
- In 2003, a memorial was built in Hanoi on the former land of his family in Quang Nguyen hamlet, Quang Phu Cau commune, Ứng Hòa District.
- in 2013, the "Monument of the Communist Soldier Tran Dang Ninh" was erected on the campus of Trần Đăng Ninh High School.
