= Xuân Thủy =

North Vietnamese politician and diplomat

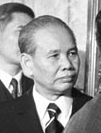

Vice Chairman and Secretary General of the Council of State
- In office 4 July 1981 – 28 June 1982; 5 years, 155 days
- President: Trường Chinh
- Succeeded by: Lê Thanh Nghị
- Constituency: Vietnam

Head of the Central Committee for Mass Mobilization and United Front
- In office March 1976 – July 1978
- Preceded by: Position re-established
- Succeeded by: Nguyễn Văn Linh
- Constituency: Vietnam

Chief Negotiator of the Government of the Democratic Republic of Vietnam
- In office 15 April 1968 – 27 January 1973; 5 years, 142 days
- Preceded by: Position established
- Succeeded by: Position abolished

Head of the Central Committee for Foreign Liaison Head of the Western Zone Affairs Committee
- In office April 1966 – December 1979
- Preceded by: Hoàng Văn Hoan
- Succeeded by: Nguyễn Thành Lê

Minister of Foreign Affairs of the Democratic Republic of Vietnam
- In office 30 April 1963 – 1 April 1965; 5 years, 137 days
- Prime Minister: Phạm Văn Đồng
- Preceded by: Ung Văn Khiêm
- Succeeded by: Nguyễn Duy Trinh

Secretary General of the Standing Committee of the National Assembly
- In office 1976–1985
- President: Trường Chinh
- Preceded by: Chu Văn Tấn
- Succeeded by: Lê Thanh Nghị

Vice Chairman of the National Assembly of Vietnam
- In office 15 July 1960 – 18 June 1985 (died); 5 years, 134 days
- President: Trường Chinh

Member of the Standing Committee of the National Assembly (2nd time)
- Incumbent
- Assumed office 25 January 1957

Member of the Standing Committee of the National Assembly (1st time)
- In office 2 March 1946 – 8 November 1946; 5 years, 120 days
- President: Nguyễn Văn Tố

Member of the Member of the National Assembly for the 1st to 8th terms
- In office 6 January 1946 – 18 June 1985; 5 years, 120 days

Alternate member of the 2nd Central Committee Member of the 3rd and 4th Central Committee
- In office 12 March 1955 – 31 March 1982; 5 years, 129 days

President of the Vietnam Journalists Association
- In office 21 April 1950 – 17 April 1959; 5 years, 124 days
- Preceded by: First
- Succeeded by: Hoàng Tùng

Personal details
- Born: 2 September 1912 Từ Liêm, Hanoi, Tonkin, French Indochina
- Died: 18 June 1985 (aged 72) Hanoi, Vietnam

Xuân Thủy (September 2, 1912 – June 20, 1985) was a Vietnamese political figure. He was the Foreign Minister of the Democratic Republic of Vietnam from 1963 to 1965 and then chief negotiator at the Paris Peace talks and also Vice Chairman and Secretary General of the Council of State.

== Early life and work ==
He was born Nguyễn Trọng Nhâm on September 2, 1912 in Hòe Thị village, Phương Canh canton, Hoài Đức district, Hà Đông province (now Phương Canh ward, Nam Từ Liêm district, Hanoi) . He was a fellow villager and born in the same year as Dr. Trần Duy Hưng, another revolutionary figure of Vietnam.

Born into a family with a Confucian tradition, he was raised in a Catholic cultural environment in his hometown from a young age, and was later sent to Hanoi for his education.

== Revolutionary journalism and early activism ==
Becoming interested in nationalist politics in his early teens, the fourteen-year-old Thuỷ entered the Revolutionary Youth League of the communist leader Ho Chi Minh. At sixteen, he was arrested for the first time. When he was eighteen, he was sent to the penal colony on Côn Sơn Island in the South China Sea. During his studies in Hanoi, Xuân Thủy became active in various patriotic organizations opposed to colonial rule. He began his career as a journalist in the 1930s and engaged in revolutionary activities through journalism starting in 1932. It was during this period that he adopted the pen name "Xuân Thủy," which he would use throughout his life.

In 1941, Thuỷ became a member of the Indochina Communist Party. After the outbreak of the Second World War in 1939, he was imprisoned in Sơn La, being held there until in 1944. However, he used his internment to edit the underground communist newspaper Suoi Reo.

In early 1944, after being released, Xuân Thủy resumed revolutionary activity within the Việt Minh movement. He became Editor-in-Chief of the Cứu Quốc newspaper, the main publication of the Việt Minh Central Committee during its clandestine period when headquartered in Núi Thầy. Under the leadership of General Secretary Trường Chinh, Xuân Thủy directed the newspaper's operations. After the success of the August Revolution, Cứu Quốc was publicly circulated daily from its new office near Hoàn Kiếm Lake, Hanoi. In early 1946, he was elected a National Assembly deputy representing Hà Đông province. The Assembly was started by the Viet Minh as a vehicle of resistance against French colonial rule in what would become the First Indochina War.

== Political and diplomatic career ==
When nationwide resistance broke out, he followed Cứu Quốc to the Việt Bắc war zone. In 1948, he became a standing member of the Việt Minh’s Central Committee, a position he held until 1950. In 1949, he founded the Huỳnh Thúc Kháng journalism training course, laying the foundation for the first generation of wartime journalists. In 1950, he was elected as the first President of the Vietnamese Journalists’ Association. The following year, he was appointed Secretary-General of the Central Committee of the Liên Việt Front. Speaking both French and Chinese fluently and known as an expert in agitprop, Thuỷ traveled both Asia and Europe visiting Vienna, Stockholm, Rangoon, Beijing, and Moscow in 1950 to gather support for the Vietnamese cause.

After the Democratic Republic of Vietnam fully regained control of North Vietnam in 1955, Xuân Thủy transitioned to higher party leadership. He served as Minister of Foreign Affairs (1963–1965) and as the chief negotiator of the Democratic Republic of Vietnam at the Paris Peace Accords from 1968 to 1973. His diplomatic skill and firm negotiation style were noted by international observers.

Throughout his political career, Xuân Thủy held various high-ranking positions: Vice Chairman and Secretary General of the Council of State (1981–1982), Vice Chairman of the National Assembly, and head of several Central Party Commissions, including those for Mass Mobilization, External Relations, and Western Affairs. He was a member of the Central Committee of the Communist Party of Vietnam and served in the Politburo from 1968 to 1982.

He died on 18 June 1985 in Hanoi at the age of 73 and was buried at Mai Dịch Cemetery.

== Honors ==
He was awarded the Ho Chi Minh Order, the Order of Independence (First Class), and the Resistance Order (First Class).

== Works ==
Xuân Thủy was a Vietnamese journalist who served on the Executive Committee of the International Organization of Journalists (OIJ), from which he also received a distinction.

In addition to being a journalist, Xuân Thủy was also a poet and translator. He is well known for translating Hồ Chí Minh’s poem Nguyên tiêu into Vietnamese under the title Rằm tháng Giêng. His poems are widely anthologized and studied in Vietnamese high schools and universities, with many included in the Xuân Thủy Selected Works collection.

His final work was the memoir titled Những chặng đường báo Cứu quốc (Milestones in the Cứu Quốc Newspaper).

He also used the pen name "Chu Lang," though it was rarely employed.

Major works

- Thơ Xuân Thủy (poetry collection, 1974)
- Đường xuân (poetry collection, 1979)
