= General Secretary of the Communist Party of Vietnam =

Political position in Vietnam

General Secretary of the Communist Party of Vietnam Central Committee
- Tổng Bí thư Ban Chấp hành Trung ương Đảng Cộng sản Việt Nam
- Emblem of the Communist Party of Vietnam

- Flag of the Communist Party of Vietnam

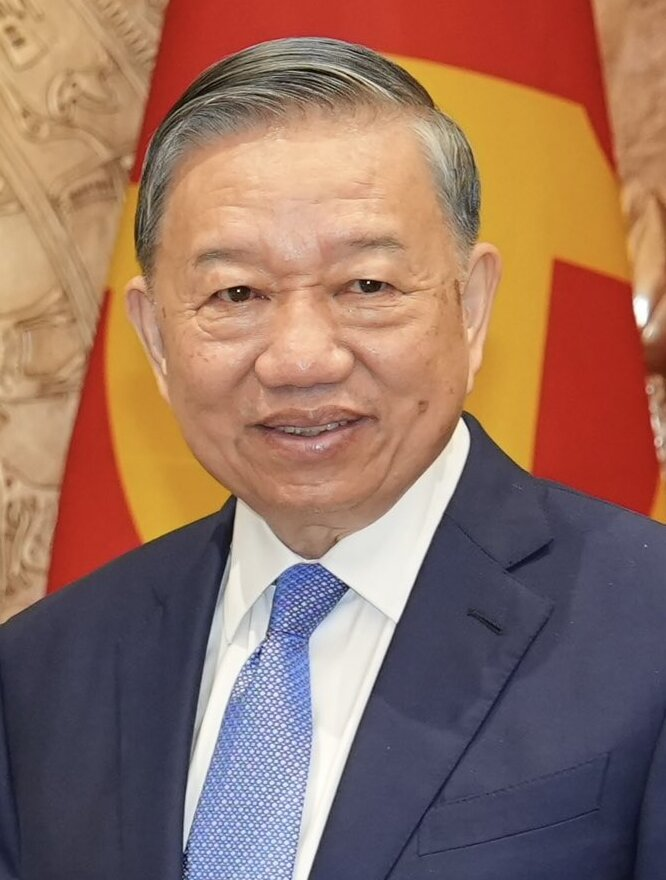
- Incumbent; Tô Lâm since 3 August 2024
- Type: Party leader
- Status: Highest ranking official / Political chief
- Member of: Central Committee; Political Bureau; Central Military Commission; Secretariat
- Appointer: Central Committee
- Term length: Five years, renewable once (but exemptions can be given)
- Precursor: Chairman; First Secretary
- Inaugural holder: Trần Phú
- Formation: 27 October 1930; 95 years ago
- Salary: 30,420,000₫ monthly ($1,186 USD)

The general secretary of the Communist Party of Vietnam Central Committee (Vietnamese: Tổng Bí thư Ban Chấp hành Trung ương Đảng Cộng sản Việt Nam) is the contemporary title for the holder of the highest office within the Communist Party of Vietnam (CPV), being in practice the highest position in the politics of Vietnam and is considered the highest political authority of Vietnam (above the president and prime minister).

== The general secretary ==
The general secretaryship used to be the second-highest office within the party when Hồ Chí Minh was the chairman, a post which existed from 1951 to 1969, and since 1969, the general secretary has generally been regarded as the highest leader of Vietnam. The general secretary also holds the title of secretary of the Central Military Commission, the leading party organ on military affairs, being the highest political and ideological leader of the People's Army of Vietnam; however, unlike other Communist Parties' leaders, the Vietnamese position rarely assumes a co-official government office or title such as State President at the same time, alongside the consensus-based five pillars slightly diluting the position's superiority in the Vietnamese political system as compared to other one-party states. The current general secretary is Tô Lâm, ranking first in the Politburo. The position was once designated the first secretary (Vietnamese: Bí thư Thứ nhất) from 1960 to 1976.

Trần Phú, one of the founding members of the Indochinese Communist Party, was the party's first general secretary. A year after being elected, he was sentenced to prison by the French authorities because of anti-French activities. He died in prison the same year. Trần's de facto successor was Lê Hồng Phong who led the party through the office of General Secretary of the Overseas Executive Committee (OEC). The OEC general secretary led the party because the Central Committee had been all but annihilated. Hà Huy Tập, the third general secretary, was removed from his post in March 1938, and was arrested by the authorities in May. Nguyễn Văn Cừ, the fourth general secretary, was arrested by the authorities in January 1940, and executed by shooting on 28 August 1941. He was succeeded by Trường Chinh. On 11 November 1945, under pressure from the Chinese Nationalist occupation of northern Vietnam, the Indochinese Communist Party was nominally dissolved and renamed the Institute for Studying Marxism in Indochina, though it continued to operate clandestinely. It was publicly reestablished as the Workers’ Party of Vietnam in February 1951.

An article in Nhân Dân on 25 March 1951 described Trường Chinh's role as the "builder and commander" of the revolution, while Hồ Chí Minh was referred to as "the soul of the Vietnamese revolution and the Vietnamese resistance". Trường Chinh was demoted as first secretary in 1956 because of his role in the Land Reform Campaign. Hồ Chí Minh took over the office of first secretary, but quickly appointed Lê Duẩn acting first secretary. Lê Duẩn was elected first secretary in 1960 and was second only to Hồ Chí Minh until the latter's death on 2 September 1969.

From 2 September 1969 until his death on 10 July 1986, Lê Duẩn was the undisputed leader of Vietnam. He died two months before the next National Party Congress. He was succeeded by Trường Chinh, the former general secretary who had served as the second-most powerful politician in Vietnam since Hồ Chí Minh's death. Trường Chinh was demoted from his post at the 6th National Party Congress and was succeeded by Nguyễn Văn Linh. The Western press called Nguyễn Văn Linh "Vietnam's Gorbachev" because of his reformist policies. He resigned because of bad health in 1991, and Đỗ Mười was appointed to the general secretaryship by the 7th National Congress. He ruled until 1997, when he was ousted from power by the reformist-wing of the party. Lê Khả Phiêu was Đỗ Mười's successor, and he was elected as a compromise candidate. He was ousted in 2001, before the 10th National Party Congress, when the Central Committee overturned a decision of the Politburo; a majority in the Central Committee voted to remove Lê Khả Phiêu as general secretary. Nông Đức Mạnh succeeded him, and he came to be considered a modernizer. Nông Đức Mạnh was also the first general secretary with a university degree. He retired in 2011, and was succeeded by Nguyễn Phú Trọng, who ruled for thirteen years before his death. After his death in 2024, Tô Lâm succeeded Trọng.

Lâm was re-elected at the 14th Party Congress.

The general secretary presides over the work of the Central Committee, the Political Bureau, the Secretariat, and chairs meetings with key leaders (Working Regulation of the Central Committee, 2011).

== List ==
General Secretary of the Indochinese Communist Party Central Committee Tổng Bí thư Ban Chấp hành Trung ương Đảng Cộng sản Đông Dương
No. (Note: These numbers are not official.)	Portrait	Name (Birth–Death)	Took office	Left office	Rank (Note: The Central Committee when it convenes for its first session after being elected by a National Party Congress elects the Politburo. According to David Koh, in interviews with several high-standing Vietnamese officials, the Politburo ranking is based upon the number of approval votes given by the Central Committee. Lê Hồng Anh, the Minister of Public Security, was ranked 2nd in the 10th Politburo because he received the second-highest number of approval votes. Another example being Tô Huy Rứa of the 10th Politburo, he was ranked at the bottom because he received the lowest number of approval votes. This system was implemented at the 1st plenum of the 10th Central Committee. Before the 10th Party Congress Politburo rankings functioned as the official order of precedence, but it no longer does (however, there are some who disagree with this view).)	Central Committee
1	A young man, in a suit with a pale shirt and dark tie	Trần Phú (1904–1931)	27 October 1930	6 September 1931†	1	Provisional Central Committee (1930–35)
2	A young man, in a suit with a pale shirt and dark tie	Lê Hồng Phong (1902–1942)	27 October 1931	26 July 1936	1	1st Central Committee (1935–45)
3	A young man, in a suit with a pale shirt and dark tie	Hà Huy Tập (1906–1941)	26 July 1936	30 March 1938	1	1st Central Committee (1935–45)
4	A young man, in a pale shirt and dark jacket	Nguyễn Văn Cừ (1912–1941)	30 March 1938	9 November 1940	1	1st Central Committee (1935–45)
5	A balding man looking to the left, dressed in a dark jascket buttoned to the neck	Trường Chinh (1907–1988)	9 November 1940	11 November 1945	1 (Note: He was ranked No. 1 until the 1945 August Revolution led by Hồ Chí Minh.)	1st Central Committee (1935–45)
First Secretary of the Workers' Party of Vietnam Central Committee Bí thư Thứ nhất Ban Chấp hành Trung ương Đảng Lao động Việt Nam
No.	Portrait	Name (Birth–Death)	Took office	Left office	Rank	Central Committee
5	A balding man looking to the left, dressed in a dark jascket buttoned to the neck	Trường Chinh (1907–1988)	19 February 1951	5 October 1956	2	2nd Central Committee (1951–60)
6	A thin-faced man with a long beard wearing traditional clothing	Hồ Chí Minh (1890–1969)	5 October 1956	10 September 1960	1	2nd Central Committee (1951–60)
6	A thin-faced man with a long beard wearing traditional clothing	Hồ Chí Minh (1890–1969)	5 October 1956	10 September 1960	1	3rd Central Committee (1960–76)
7		Lê Duẩn (1907–1986)	10 September 1960	20 December 1976	2 (Note: He was ranked second until the death of Hồ Chí Minh, the CPV chairman, on 2 September 1969.)	3rd Central Committee (1960–76)
General Secretary of the Communist Party of Vietnam Central Committee Tổng Bí thư Ban Chấp hành Trung ương Đảng Cộng sản Việt Nam
7		Lê Duẩn (1907–1986)	20 December 1976	10 July 1986†	1	4th Central Committee (1976–81)
7		Lê Duẩn (1907–1986)	20 December 1976	10 July 1986†	1	5th Central Committee (1981–86)
5	A balding man looking to the left, dressed in a dark jacket buttoned to the neck	Trường Chinh (1907–1988)	14 July 1986	18 December 1986	1	5th Central Committee (1981–86)
8		Nguyễn Văn Linh (1915–1998)	18 December 1986	28 June 1991	1	6th Central Committee (1986–91)
9	An old graying man wearing white jacket	Đỗ Mười (1917–2018)	28 June 1991	26 December 1997	1	7th Central Committee (1991–96)
9	An old graying man wearing white jacket	Đỗ Mười (1917–2018)	28 June 1991	26 December 1997	1	8th Central Committee (1996–2001)
10		Lê Khả Phiêu (1931–2020)	26 December 1997	22 April 2001	1	8th Central Committee (1996–2001)
11	a man with greying black hair, wearing a suit and tie	Nông Đức Mạnh (born 1940) (Note: He is currently the only living former general secretary)	22 April 2001	19 January 2011	1	9th Central Committee (2001–2006)
11	a man with greying black hair, wearing a suit and tie	Nông Đức Mạnh (born 1940)	22 April 2001	19 January 2011	1	10th Central Committee (2006–2011)
12		Nguyễn Phú Trọng (1944–2024)	19 January 2011	19 July 2024†	1	11th Central Committee (2011–2016)
12		Nguyễn Phú Trọng (1944–2024)	19 January 2011	19 July 2024†	1	12th Central Committee (2016–2021) 13th Central Committee (2021–2024)
12		Nguyễn Phú Trọng (1944–2024)	19 January 2011	19 July 2024†	1	13th Central Committee partial (2024–2026)
13		Tô Lâm (born 1957)	3 August 2024	Incumbent	1	13th Central Committee partial (2024–2026)
13		Tô Lâm (born 1957)	3 August 2024	Incumbent	1	14th Central Committee (2026–2031)

Chairman of the Workers' Party of Vietnam Central Committee Chủ tịch Ban Chấp hành Trung ương Đảng Lao động Việt Nam
No.	Portrait	Name (Birth–Death)	Took office	Left office	Rank	Central Committee
*	A thin-faced man with a long beard wearing traditional clothing	Hồ Chí Minh (1890–1969)	19 February 1951	2 September 1969†	1	2nd Central Committee (1951–1960); 3rd Central Committee (1960–1976)

Key

† Died in office

== See also ==
- Permanent Member of the Secretariat
- General Secretary of the Chinese Communist Party
- General Secretary of the Workers' Party of Korea
- General Secretary of the Communist Party of the Soviet Union

== Bibliography ==
- Abuza, Zachary (2001). The Lessons of Le Kha Phieu: Changing Rules in Vietnamese politics. Vietnamese Professionals of America. The Catholic University of America.
- Brocheux, Pierre (2007). Ho Chi Minh: a Biography. Cambridge University Press. ISBN 9780521850629.
- Corfield, Justin (2008). The History of Vietnam. ABC-CLIO. ISBN 9780313341946.
- Currey, Cecil (2005). Victory At Any Cost: The Genius of Vietnam's Gen. Vo Nguyen Giap. Potomac Books. ISBN 9781612340104.* Dodd, Jan; Lewis, Mark; Emmons, Ron (2003). Rough Guide to Vietnam. Rough Guides. ISBN 9781843530954.
- Koh, David (July–August 2008). "Leadership Changes at the 10th Congress of the Vietnamese Communist Party". Asian Survey. 48 (4). University of California Press: 650–672. doi:10.1525/as.2008.48.4.650. JSTOR 10.1525/as.2008.48.4.650.
- Largo, V. (2002). Vietnam: Current Issues and Historical Background. Nova Publishers. ISBN 9781590333686.
- Mason, Michael G.; Mason, Mike (1997). Development and Disorder: A History of the Third World Since 1945. University Press of New England. ISBN 9780874518290.
- Ooi, Keat Gin (2004). Southeast Asia: a Historical Encyclopedia, from Angkor Wat to East Timor. Vol. 2. ABC-CLIO. ISBN 9781576077702.
- Porter, Gareth (1993). Vietnam: The Politics of Bureaucratic Socialism. Cornell University Press. ISBN 9780801421686.
- Quinn-Judge, Sophie (2002). Ho Chi Minh: The Missing Years, 1919–1941. University of California Press. ISBN 9780520235335.
- Van, Canh Nguyen; Cooper, Earle (1983). Vietnam under Communism, 1975–1982. Hoover Press. ISBN 9780817978518.
- Woods, L. Shelton (2002). Vietnam: a Global Studies Handbook. ABC-CLIO. ISBN 9781576074169.
- Thai, Quang Trung (2002). Collective Leadership and Factionalism: an Essay on Ho Chi Minh's Legacy. Institute of Southeast Asian Studies. ISBN 9789971988012.
