= Gold Star Order =

Huân chương Sao vàng (Gold Star Order)
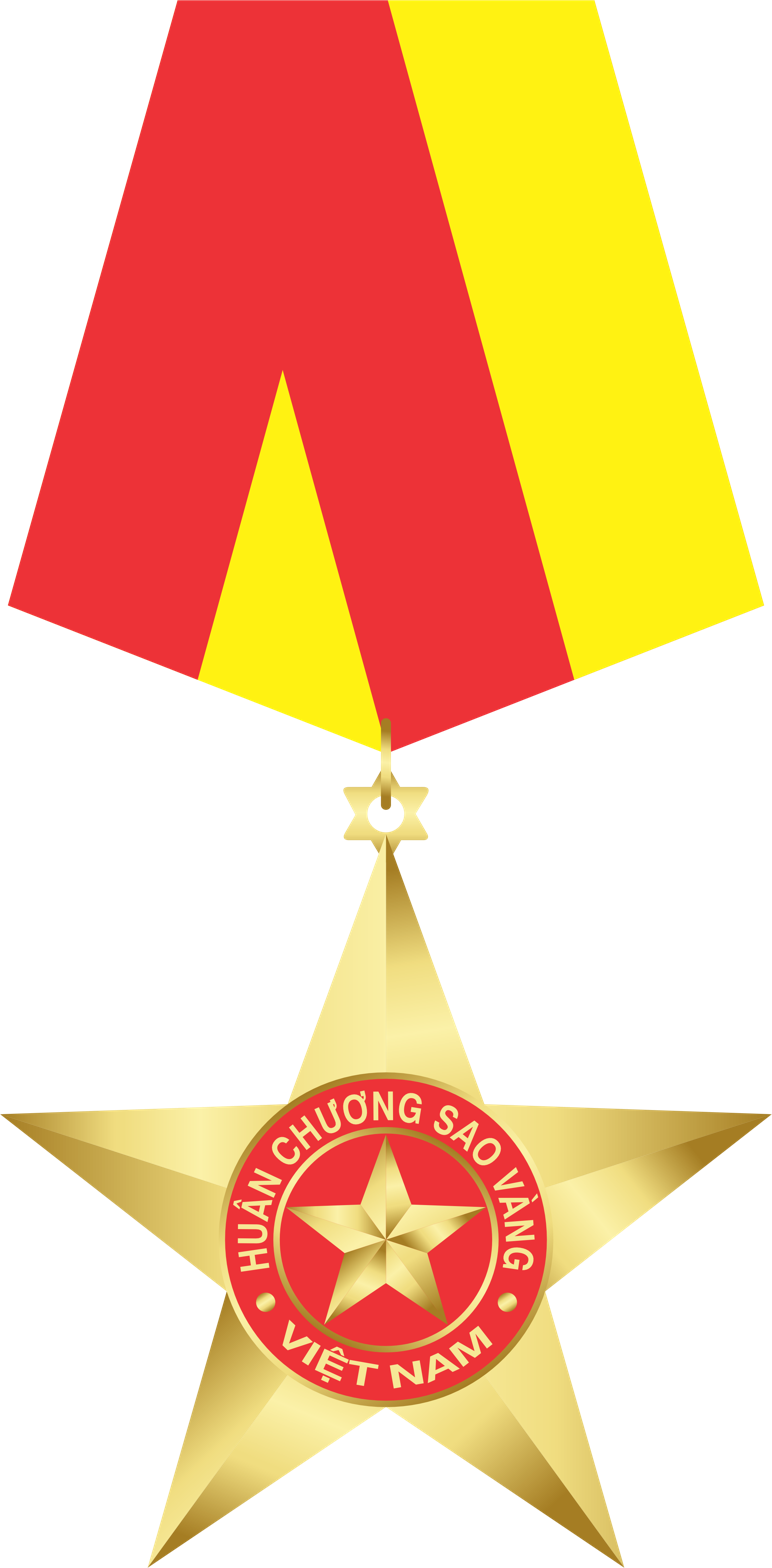
- Type: Single-grade order
- Awarded for: "personnel who completed exceptional service or organization established excellent achievement for the revolutionary cause of the Party and Nation."
- Presented by: the Government of Vietnam
- Eligibility: Military and civil personnel or organization
- Status: Currently awarded
- Established: June 6, 1947
- First award: 1958
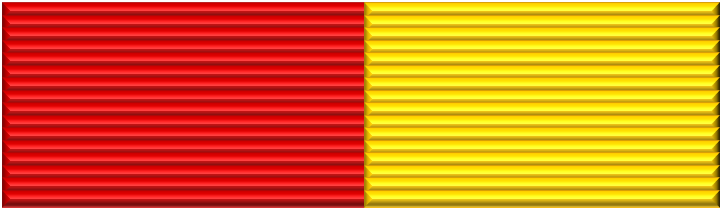
- Ribbon bar of the order

Precedence
- Next (higher): None
- Next (lower): Ho Chi Minh Order

Gold Star Order (Vietnamese: Huân chương Sao vàng) is the highest decoration in Vietnam awards and decorations awarded by the Government of Vietnam for a military or civil "personnel who completed exceptional service or organization established excellent achievement for the revolutionary cause of the Party and Nation." The order was established on June 6, 1947, following the decree No. 58/SL by the Government of the Democratic Republic of Vietnam, its design was modified by the Law of Emulation and Reward promulgated on November 26, 2003.

== Appearance ==
According to the 1947 decree, the medal of Gold Star Order consisted of two parts, a five-pointed star in gilt-bronze attached to a red neckband with yellow edge. The 2003 Law proposed a new model of the medal which are composed of three parts, the five-pointed star, the ribbon and the bar symbolizing the Flag of Vietnam.

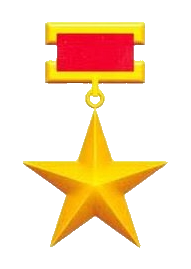
The Gold Star Order in 1947 to 2003

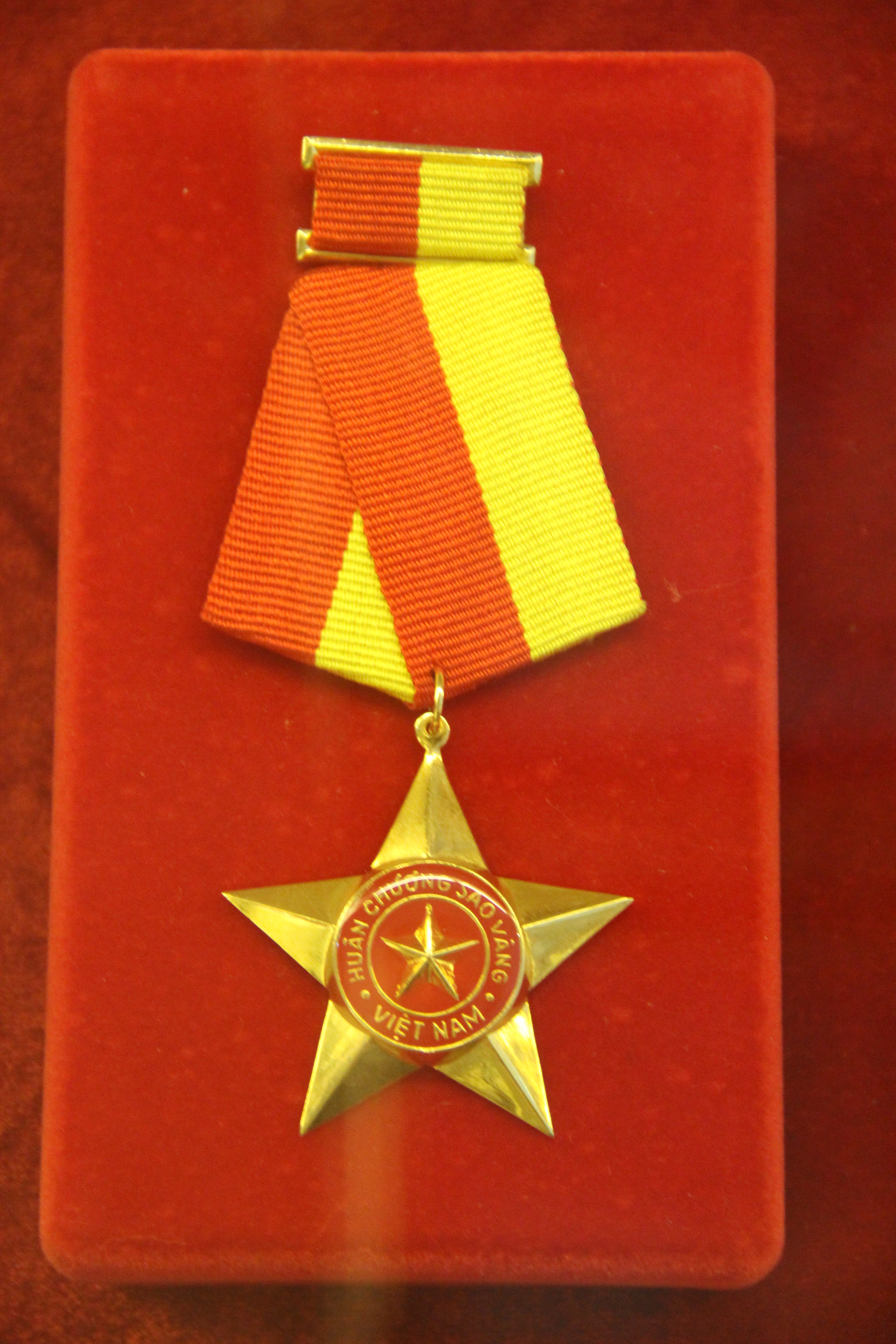
Current Gold Star Order on display at Vietnam Military History Museum.

== Criteria ==
The Gold Star Order is bestowed on the person who has exceptional contribution for the Party and the Nation, for example ones who had participated in the revolutionary movement before 1935 and had occupied the positions of leaders of the Party, the Government or commander in chief of the Vietnam People's Army. If the person began to dedicate for the revolutionary cause and the country after 1945, to be eligible for the Order, that person has to undertake one of the positions of General Secretary of the Party, President of Vietnam, Prime Minister of Vietnam, President of the National Assembly or General of the armed forces before April 30, 1975. The person who brought significant change to the country or had works with deep impact for the society, security and economy of Vietnam is also available for the Gold Star Order. Heads of foreign states who actively contributed to Vietnam are sometimes recognized by the Government of Vietnam with the Gold Star Order. Additionally, the Gold Star Order can be awarded collectively for an organization, civil or military unit, who did excellent achievements for the Party and the Nation.

== Notable recipients ==
=== Individual ===
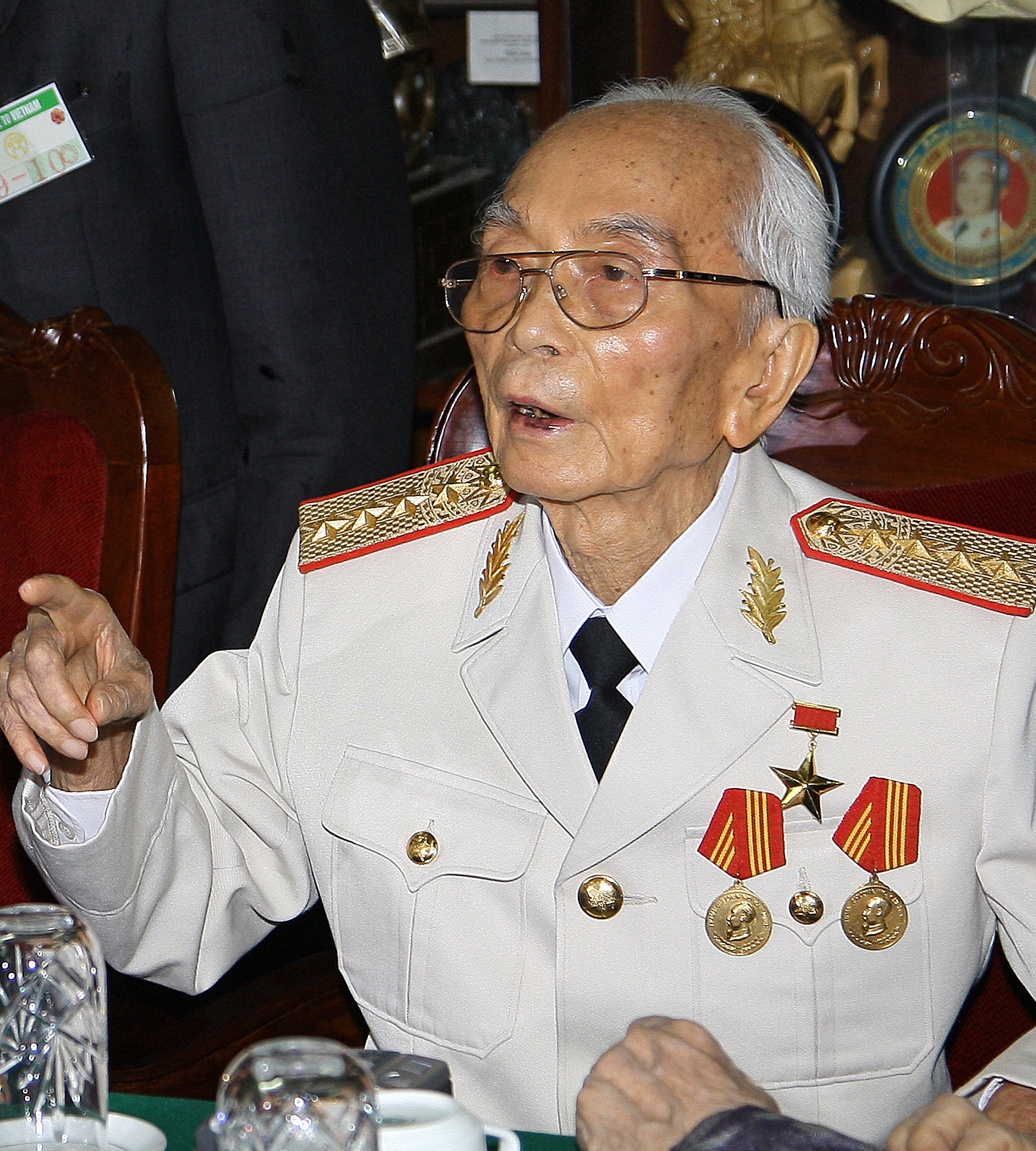
Gen. Võ Nguyên Giáp with his Gold Star Order (old style) between two Ho Chi Minh Orders.

| Recipient | Birth-death | Position | Year awarded | Ref |
|---|---|---|---|---|
| Tôn Đức Thắng | 1888–1980 | President of Vietnam | 1958 | |
| Võ Nguyên Giáp | 1911–2013 | General, Commander-in-chief of the Vietnam People's Army, Minister of Defence of Vietnam | 1992 | |
| Lê Duẩn | 1907–1986 | General Secretary of the Communist Party of Vietnam | | |
| Trường Chinh | 1907–1988 | President of Vietnam, General Secretary of the Party | | |
| Phạm Văn Đồng | 1906–2000 | Prime Minister of Vietnam | 1990 | |
| Phạm Hùng | 1912–1988 | Prime Minister of Vietnam | | |
| Nguyễn Văn Linh | 1915–1998 | General Secretary of the Party | | |
| Lê Đức Thọ | 1911–1990 | Head of the Central Organizing Department | | |
| Võ Chí Công | 1912–2011 | President of Vietnam | 1992 | |
| Võ Văn Kiệt | 1922–2008 | Prime Minister of Vietnam | 1997 | |
| Lê Quang Đạo | 1921–1999 | President of the National Assembly of Vietnam | 2002 (posthumously) | |
| Văn Tiến Dũng | 1917–2002 | General, Minister of Defence of Vietnam | | |
| Lê Đức Anh | 1920–2019 | President of Vietnam, Minister of Defence of Vietnam | | |
| Nguyễn Hữu Thọ | 1910–1996 | President of the National Assembly, Acting President of Vietnam | 1993 | |
| Đỗ Mười | 1917–2018 | General Secretary of the Party, Prime Minister of Vietnam | | |
| Huỳnh Tấn Phát | 1913–1989 | Chairman of Government of the Republic of South Vietnam | 2005 (posthumously) | |
| Nguyễn Chí Thanh | 1914–1967 | General, Director of the Department of Politics of the Vietnam People's Army | posthumously | |
| Lê Trọng Tấn | 1914–1986 | General, Chief of the General Staff | 2007 (posthumously) | |
| Hoàng Văn Thái | 1915–1986 | General, Chief of the General Staff | 2007 (posthumously) | |
| Trần Nam Trung | 1912–2009 | Colonel General, Minister of Defense of Republic of South Vietnam (1969–1975) | 2007 | |
| Trần Quý Hai | 1913–1985 | Lieutenant General, Deputy Chief of the General Staff | 2008 (posthumously) | |
| Jambyn Batmönkh | 1926–1997 | President of Mongolia | | |
| Kaysone Phomvihane | 1920–1992 | President of Laos | | |
| Khamtai Siphandone | 1924–2025 | President of Laos | | |
| Fidel Castro | 1926–2016 | President of Cuba | 1982 | |
| Kim Il Sung | 1912–1994 | President of North Korea | | |

=== Collective ===
| Recipient | Year awarded |
|---|---|
| The City of Hanoi | 2003 and 2004 (two times) |
| People's Army of Vietnam | five times |
| People's Police of Vietnam | 1980, 1985, 2000 (three times) |
| Hanoi Medical University | |
| Vietnam National University, Hanoi | 2006 |
| Vietnam News Agency | |

== See also ==
- Vietnam awards and decorations
- The list of individuals and collectives awarded Gold Star Order (Vietnam)
