= 3rd National Congress of the Workers' Party of Vietnam =

1960 congress in Hanoi, Vietnam

The Third National Congress of the Workers' Party of Vietnam took place from September 5 to 10, 1960 in Hanoi, North Vietnam. The congress was attended by 525 official delegates and 51 alternate delegates, representing 500,000 party members from both regions of the country, along with the presence of more than 16 Communist Parties across the world and other international organizations.

== Historical context ==
The Third Congress of the Workers' Party of Vietnam took place in the context of North Vietnam having just completed economic recovery after the Resistance war against France and Land Reform along with Industrial and Commercial Reform; while in South Vietnam, an insurgency against Ngo Dinh Diem and American influence had been taking place since late 1959 and had become the Đồng Khởi Movement since early 1960.

== Work ==
The Congress discussed and assessed that the revolution in the two regions was making important progress. From that assessment, the Congress set out the strategic tasks of the revolution in the whole country and the tasks of each region; clearly pointed out the position and role of the revolution in each region and the relationship between the revolution in the two regions.

=== Northern revolutionary mission ===
After completing the work of overcoming the consequences of the Resistance War against France and carrying out the initial tasks of the people's democratic government based on the experience of the Soviet Union and Eastern Europe after World War II, the Congress decided to lead the North to the socialist revolution, made an assessment of the socialist revolution, prioritised the development of heavy industry in a reasonable manner, and at the same time made efforts to develop agriculture and light industry in the North, which would play the most decisive role in the development of the entire Vietnamese revolution and in the cause of national reunification.

=== Southern revolutionary mission ===
Because France did not hold a general election according to the 1954 Geneva Agreement and the movement to implement the agreement was suppressed by the Diem government, due to fear of failure, Vietnam could not be unified. Therefore, the Congress decided to carry out a People's national democratic revolution in the South and determined that this revolution would have a direct decisive role in the cause of liberating the South.

=== Revolutionary relations between the two regions ===
The Congress recognized that the revolutions of the two regions were closely related, closely linked and had mutual impacts in order to complete the People's national democratic revolution throughout the country and achieve peaceful national reunification. The North increased production, providing manpower and resources for the southern front to advance to complete the revolution and completely unify the country.

=== The first five-year plan 1961–1965 ===
In order to realize the goal of advancing rapidly, strongly, and steadily toward socialism, the Congress proposed the First Five–Year Plan 1961–1965. The main task of this Plan was socialist industrialization, taking the development of heavy industry as the foundation, while striving to develop light industry and agriculture.

=== Other activities ===
Through the Political Report, the Report on the Amendment of the Party Charter. Elected a new Central Executive Committee consisting of 47 official members and 31 alternate members. The new Executive Committee elected a Politburo consisting of 11 official members and 2 alternate members. Ho Chi Minh continued to be the Party Chairman, Lê Duẩn became the First Secretary (General Secretary).

== See more ==
- Communist Party of Vietnam
- Five-Year Plans of Vietnam
