= Nguyễn Thị Thập =

Vietnamese revolutionary and politician

- Born: Nguyễn Thị Ngọc Tốt; 10 October 1908; Mỹ Tho, French Cochinchina
- Died: 19 March 1996 (aged 87); Ho Chi Minh City, Vietnam
- Resting place: Tiền Giang
- Political party: Communist Party of Indochina

Career in the Vietnamese Women's Union

President of the VWU
- In office 1956-1974
- Preceded by: Lê Thị Xuyến [vi]
- Succeeded by: Hà Thị Quế [vi]

Honorary President of the VWU
- In office 1974-1982
- President: Hà Thị Quế [vi]

Parliamentary career

Member of the National Assembly
- In office 1946-1971
- Constituency: Mỹ Tho
- In office 1971-1976
- Constituency: Hanoi
- In office 1976-1981
- Constituency: Tiền Giang province

Vice Chair of the National Assembly
- In office 1964-1975 Serving with Hoàng Văn Hoan, Nguyễn Xiển [vi], Trần Đăng Khoa [vi], Chu Văn Tấn, Nguyễn Văn Hưởng [vi]
- President: Tôn Đức Thắng
- Prime Minister: Phạm Văn Đồng
- Chair of the assembly: Trường Chinh

Nguyễn Thị Thập (Mỹ Tho Province, 10 October 1908 – 19 March 1996) was a Vietnamese revolutionary and politician. She was a deputy to the National Assembly of Vietnam and President of Vietnam Women's Union (1956–1974). She was also the first woman and only woman awarded the Gold Star Medal in 1985, the highest honour in Vietnam.

== Biography ==
Nguyễn Thị Thập was born Nguyễn Thị Ngọc Tốt on October 10, 1908, in Long Hưng, Châu Thành, in the then Mỹ Tho Province (today Tiền Giang Province). At the age of 20, she became enlightened revolutionary ideal, participation and Agriculture organization at home. In 1931 she joined the Communist Party of Indochina (Đảng Cộng sản Đông Dương). From there she took the alias Mười Thập or Nguyễn Thị Thập. She took part in revolutionary movements in Mỹ Tho, Tân An, Bến Tre, and Saigon. On 4 March 1935 she was elected to the Party Committee of the South. May 1935, she was arrested by the French, sentenced to prison. End of her term, her home secretly engaged in revolutionary activities. After the tax farmers protest leaders in Long Hung Commune, she was arrested again, but the people of Long Hung, Long Dinh pull to release her.

In 1940, she was a leading female figure in the Cochinchina uprising in Mỹ Tho Province. Her husband was also a soldier who had been imprisoned by the French in Côn Đảo in 1930. After the 1940 Cochinchina uprising, her husband was arrested (January 1941) by the French for taking part in the uprising and executed. In 1945 she joined leaders to seize power in Mỹ Tho Province. In 1946 she was elected a delegate to the first National Assembly of Vietnam Democratic Republic.

During 9 years of war against the French, she was appointed as Secretary of the Party Group Southern women, the Women's Head of the South. After practicing for the North (1954), she was elected President of the Vietnam Women's Union (1956–1974). In 1955, she was elected to the Central Committee of the Vietnam Workers' Party until retirement (1980). She was assigned by the Party and State of Vietnam many important positions: Secretary of the Party Group of women, Head of the spare carrier Party Central Committee (Trưởng ban phụ vận Trung ương Đảng).

She was elected to the National Assembly of Vietnam for 6 consecutive terms, from 1946 to 1981. She was also Vice Chair of the National Assembly from its third and fourth terms, 1964 to 1975. She was awarded the Gold Star Order (Sao vàng) - the highest medal of the State of Vietnam, as well as the Vietnamese heroine mother title.

She died on March 19, 1996, in Ho Chi Minh City. She was buried in the cemetery of martyrs of Tiền Giang Province (Nghĩa trang liệt sỹ tỉnh Tiền Giang), next to the grave of her husband. Streets have been named for her in Ho Chi Minh City, My Tho City and other cities.
