= Trần Phương =

Vietnamese politician (1927–2025)

Minister of Domestic Trade
- In office 22 January 1981 – 23 April 1982
- Prime Minister: Phạm Văn Đồng
- Preceded by: Trần Văn Hiển
- Succeeded by: Lê Đức Thịnh

Personal details
- Born: 1 July 1927 Mỹ Hào, Tonkin, French Indochina
- Died: 18 October 2025 (aged 98) Hanoi, Vietnam
- Party: CPV
- Education: Chu Văn An High School, Hanoi
- Occupation: Military officer

Trần Phương (1 July 1927 – 18 October 2025) was a Vietnamese politician. A member of the Communist Party, he served as Minister of Domestic Trade from 1981 to 1982.

Trần died in Hanoi on 18 October 2025, at the age of 98.
