= Trần Quý Hai =

Lieutenant general in the People's Army of Vietnam (1913–1985)

Lieutenant General Trần Quý Hai

Deputy Chief of General Staff
- In office 1955–1961
- President: Hồ Chí Minh
- Minister: Võ Nguyên Giáp

Deputy Minister of Ministry of Defence
- In office 1961–1980
- President: Hồ Chí Minh, Tôn Đức Thắng
- Minister: Võ Nguyên Giáp

Personal details
- Born: Bùi Chấn; 20 May 1913 Sơn Tịnh, Quảng Ngãi, Annam (French protectorate)
- Died: 1985 (aged 71–72) Socialist Republic of Vietnam
- Party: Communist Party of Vietnam
- Awards: Gold Star Order (posthumously); Ho Chi Minh Order
- Nickname: Võ Văn Khế

Military service
- Allegiance: Democratic Republic of Vietnam and later Vietnam
- Branch/service: People's Army of Vietnam
- Rank: Lieutenant General
- Commands: 101st Regiment (Trần Cao Vân Regt.); 325th Division) (Bình Trị Thiên Div.); B5 Front (Highway 9– Northern Quảng Trị Front)
- Battles/wars: First Indochina War; Lower Laos campaign; Vietnam War; Battle of Đông Hà; Battle of Khe Sanh; 2nd Battle of Quảng Trị

Trần Quý Hai (born Bùi Chấn)(1913–1985) was a lieutenant-general in the People's Army of Vietnam (PAVN) active during the First Indochina War, and the Vietnam War. He commanded Việt Cộng forces in Battle of Khe Sanh and Second Battle of Quảng Trị.

== Early years ==
Trần Quý Hai was born in 1913 as Bùi Chấn to a poor peasant family in Châu Sa commune, Sơn Tịnh district of Quảng Ngãi province. He took part in revolutionary movements since early ages and joined the Indochinese Communist Party in October 1930. In mid-1931, Bùi Chấn was jailed by the French colonial authorities for supporting Nghệ-Tĩnh Soviets. Freed in 1932, Chấn continued operating in communist movements till 1939 – when he was arrested again for leading anti-tax movement in Sơn Tịnh and Bình Sơn districts.

When Chấn's prison term was over in mid-1944, the colonial authorities sent him to Ba Tơ exile house where he and his comrades like Trương Quang Giao, Phạm Kiệt, Trần Lương and Nguyễn Đôn clandestinely established the Provisional Provincial Party Committee of Quảng Ngãi. Together with other comrades in the committee, Bùi Chấn led Ba Tơ uprising in March 1945, then August Revolution in Quảng Ngãi successfully. In September 1945, he was named Secretary of the provincial committee.

== Military career ==
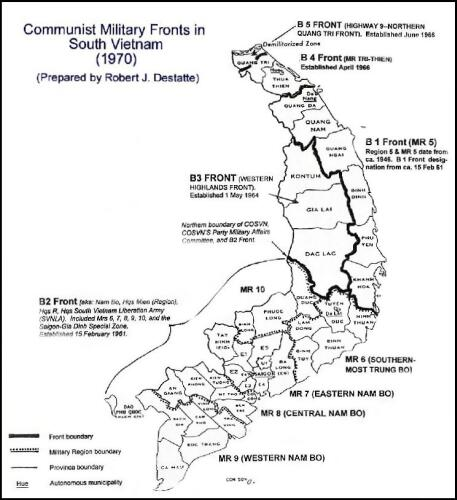
NLF Fronts and Military regions, 1970

In early 1946, Chấn was sent to fighting against the French in Thừa Thiên-Huế front. After voted to the standing committee of the Provincial Party Committee of Thừa Thiên-Huế, Bùi Chấn changed his name to Trần Quý Hai. In February 1947, he was assigned commissar of Trần Cao Vân regiment (aka the 101st regiment).

In 1949, the General Staff established Bình Trị Thiên front (later divided to B4 and B5 fronts), appointed Trần Quý Hai to commissar beside Hà Văn Lâu - the front commander. Two years later, he was assigned to commander cum commissar of the newly formed 325th Brigade.

During the Vietnam War, Trần Quý Hai was promoted to Deputy Chief of the General Staff in 1955, major general in 1958, then Deputy Defence Minister of Vietnam in 1961.

During 1968, Gen. Hai commanded DMZ Front (aka B5 Front or Highway 9–Northern Quảng Trị Front by PAVN) fighting Battle of Khe Sanh in Tet Offensive, and Battle of Đông Hà in May Offensive.

In 1972, he commanded B5 Front fighting Second Battle of Quảng Trị.

== Award and legacy ==
In 2008, LTG Trần Quý Hai was posthumously awarded Gold Star Order.
