= Hồ Tùng Mậu =

Vietnamese activist and politician

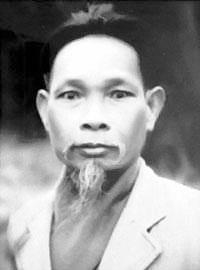
Image of Hồ Tùng Mậu

Hồ Tùng Mậu (15 June 1896 – 23 July 1951) was a revolutionary activist and politician in Vietnam. He was a member of both the Chinese Communist Party and the Communist Party of Vietnam, a member of the Central Central Committee of the Communist Party of Vietnam, the Inspector General of the Government Inspectorate.

== Biography ==
In March 1926, he joined the Chinese Communist Party. After four years, he became a member of the Communist Party of Vietnam. He was arrested three times by the Chiang Kai-shek government in 1927, 1928 and 1929. Released late in 1929, he actively contributed to the unification of Vietnamese communist organizations in Kowloon (Hong Kong) on February 3, 1930.

After the August Revolution, he was assigned to the positions of: Head of the Main Military School, President of the Inter-Zone IV Resistance Committee, and Standing Member of the Inter-Regional Party Committee. In 1947, he was the head of the Government Inspectorate Board, and later became the president of Friendship Association of Viet Hoa. At the Second Party Congress in February 1951, he was elected as an alternate member of the Central Committee of the Communist Party.

On July 23, 1951, he sacrificed on his way into the Inter-operative Zone IV, being hit by a French plane in Phố Còng, Tĩnh Gia district, Thanh Hóa province.

== Legacy ==
After news of his death, Ho Chi Minh signed a decree posthumously awarded the Order of Ho Chi Minh.

In 2008, he was awarded Gold Star Medal, the most noble medal of Vietnam.

His name is set for many streets and schools in Vietnam.

== See also ==
- List of recipients of the Gold Star Order (Vietnam)
