= Nguyễn Lam (footballer) =

Vietnamese footballer (born 1997)

Personal information
- Birth name: Nguyễn Lam
- Date of birth: 26 December 1997 (age 28)
- Place of birth: Ninh Thuận, Vietnam
- Height: 1.65 m (5 ft 5 in)
- Positions: Attacking midfielder; winger

Team information
- Current team: Khatoco Khánh Hòa
- Number: 4

Youth career
- 2007–2014: HAGL–Arsenal JMG

Senior career*
| Years | Team | Apps | (Gls) |
| 2015–2021 | Hoàng Anh Gia Lai | 6 | (1) |
| 2018 | → Bình Định (loan) | | |
| 2019 | → Hải Phòng (loan) | 2 | (0) |
| 2020–2021 | → Bà Rịa-Vũng Tàu (loan) | 8 | (0) |
| 2021–2022 | Đắk Lắk | 7 | (0) |
| 2022–2023 | Cần Thơ | | |
| 2023–2024 | Bình Phước | 10 | (0) |
| 2024– | Khatoco Khánh Hòa | 1 | (0) |
- * Club domestic league appearances and goals as of 21 June 2025

Nguyễn Lam (born 26 December 1997) is a Vietnamese professional footballer who play as an attacking midfielder or winger for V.League 2 club Khatoco Khánh Hòa.

== Early life ==
When Lam was a child, his father died early, leading his mother to raise their two sons alone.

== Club career ==
Lam joined HAGL–Arsenal JMG Academy in 2007, being one of the youngest players in the team at that time.

In 2015, Lam was promoted to Hoàng Anh Gia Lai's first team. He made his first V.League 1 debut against QNK Quảng Nam on 15 July 2015, at 17 years and 206 days old, set a record as the youngest player ever to play in the V.League 1 (this record was later broken by Bùi Tiến Dụng). On 5 September 2016, he scored his first professional goal against Đồng Tháp.

In 2018, Lam left Hoàng Anh Gia Lai, played for several clubs in V.League 2 and Vietnam Second Division.

In 2024, he joined Khatoco Khánh Hòa.

== Style of play ==
Lam can play as an attacking midfielder, striker and winger. He also has a good finishing and dribbling ability, similar to Nguyễn Công Phượng. However, his low physical and his short height is a disadvantage.
