= Hoàng Văn Hoan =

Vietnamese politician (1905–1991)

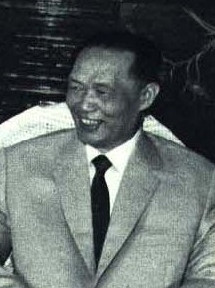

Vice Chairman of the National Assembly of Vietnam (1st, 2nd, 3rd, 4th, 5th, 6th)
- In office 23 April 1958 – 24 June 1979
- Chairman: Trường Chinh

General Secretary of the Standing Committee of the National Assembly (1st, 2nd)
- In office April 1958 – June 1962
- Chairman: Trường Chinh
- Succeeded by: Xuân Thủy

Communist Party Secretary of Hanoi
- In office January 1961 – June 1961
- Deputy: Nguyễn Thọ Chân; Trần Minh Việt; Trần Anh Liên
- Preceded by: Trần Danh Tuyên
- Succeeded by: Nguyễn Lam

Member of the Politburo of the Communist Party of Vietnam (2nd, 3rd)
- In office October 1956 – December 1976
- General Secretary: Hồ Chí Minh; Lê Duẩn (as First Secretary)

Ambassador of Vietnam to China with accreditation as North Korea & Mongolia
- In office 1950 – April 1957
- Succeeded by: Nguyễn Khang (to China); Trần Xuân Độ (to North Korea)

Member of the Central Committee of the Communist Party of Vietnam
- In office August 1945 – December 1976
- General Secretary: Trường Chinh; Hồ Chí Minh; Lê Duẩn (as First Secretary)

Personal details
- Born: Hoàng Ngọc Ân; 1905 Quỳnh Lưu, Nghệ An Province, Annam Protectorate, French Indochina
- Died: 18 May 1991 (aged 85–86) Beijing, China
- Party: Communist Party of Vietnam (expelled in 1979)

Hoàng Văn Hoan (1905 – 18 May 1991) was a Vietnamese politician and diplomat. An early member of the Indochinese Communist Party, he became an ally of Ho Chi Minh during the struggle against French colonial rule. Following independence, he became an important politician in Hồ's communist-controlled Democratic Republic of Vietnam (North Vietnam) and served as a member of the Politburo of the Communist Party of Vietnam from 1960 to 1976. He was a leading figure of the Party's pro-China wing, and his political fortunes deteriorated in tandem with Sino-Vietnamese relations. Following the 1979 Sino-Vietnamese War, he controversially defected to China and spent the rest of his life in exile.

== Biography ==
=== Early life and political career ===
Hoan was born in Nghệ An Province in 1905. In later years, it was occasionally rumored that he was part of Vietnam's Hoa Chinese minority. However, he denied the accusations and said that he was "100% ethnic Vietnamese."

In the 1920s, he moved to Guangzhou, China, a base for revolutionaries from then-French Indochina. He studied at the Whampoa Military Academy and became an associate of Ho Chi Minh. In 1930, he helped Ho found the Indochinese Communist Party. In 1941, he set up the Viet Minh to fight against French colonial rule. He was a delegate to the 1954 Geneva Conference, which addressed lingering issues from the First Indochina War.

Following independence, he served as Vice Chairman of the Standing Committee of the North Vietnam (and later all-Vietnam) National Assembly from 1958 to 1979, and was on the Politburo from 1960 to 1976.

=== Relationship with China ===
Hoan was known for his pro-Chinese stance. During the years when North and South Vietnam were divided, he was a crucial link between North Vietnam and the People's Republic of China. He served as North Vietnam's first ambassador to China from 1950 to 1957.

Hoan's influence peaked in the early 1960s when North Vietnam's leadership temporarily aligned with China during the Sino-Soviet dispute. In 1963, as part of this policy shift, Hoan was appointed head of the party's International Liaison Department at the same time that the more pro-Chinese Xuân Thủy became Foreign Minister.

Beginning around 1965, however, as Soviet aid became critical to the war effort, Hanoi began to improve relations with the Soviet Union, leading to increased tensions with Beijing. In this new political atmosphere, the Vietnamese leadership, directed by First Secretary Lê Duẩn, replaced officials who were strongly identified with the previous pro-Chinese policy. Both Xuân Thủy and Hoan were removed from their key foreign policy posts. Despite his diminished role, Hoan was still used for sensitive diplomatic missions due to his personal connections in Beijing. In May 1973, he conducted secret talks in China regarding the Cambodian Civil War. He traveled to China again in 1974, officially for "medical treatment," a trip that coincided with unsuccessful Sino-Vietnamese border negotiations.

His political career effectively ended at the Fourth National Party Congress in December 1976, where he was removed from the Politburo and the Central Committee as the party formalized its pro-Soviet orientation.

=== Defection and exile ===
In early 1979, Vietnam and China fought a brief, but significant, war. Hoan was subjected to political isolation and surveillance.

After the war ended, Hoan defected to China in July 1979. While traveling to East Germany for medical care, he eluded his escorts during a transit stop in Karachi, Pakistan, and sought refuge at the Chinese consulate before flying to Beijing. At a press conference in August 1979, Hoan stated that Vietnam's persecution of its ethnic Chinese minority was "even worse than Hitler's treatment of the Jews" and accused Vietnamese leaders of becoming "subservient to a foreign power," a reference to the Soviet Union. The Vietnamese authorities denounced Hoan as a traitor and sentenced him to death in absentia.

During his exile, Hoan attacked the Vietnamese government and defended China against Vietnamese complaints, such as a November 1979 allegation that China undermined Vietnamese revolutionaries during the revolution against France. He said that North Vietnam enraged China by entering peace talks with the United States in 1968 without consulting Beijing, and even claimed that Lê Duẩn had deceived the ailing Ho Chi Minh about his intentions to negotiate. He also authored a political memoir titled Giọt nước trong biển cả (released in English as A Drop in the Ocean: Hoang Van Hoan's Revolutionary Reminiscences). In his writings, he alleged, without providing evidence, that the CPV's Central Committee had decided in 1982 to increase opium production to raise foreign currency.

In January 1991, Hoan was hospitalized with a lung infection. He died in Beijing on May 18, 1991.

== Works ==
- Hoang Van Hoan (1988). A Drop in the Ocean: Hoang Van Hoan's Revolutionary Reminiscences. Beijing: Foreign Languages Press. ISBN 9780835122559.
- — (1989). Selected Works of Hoang Van Hoan. Beijing: Foreign Languages Press. ISBN 9787119006048.
