= Nguyễn Chí Thanh =

North Vietnamese commander (1913–1967)

Army general Nguyễn Chí Thanh
- Born: 1 January 1914; Huế, Annam, French Indochina
- Died: 6 July 1967 (aged 53); Hanoi, North Vietnam
- Military career
- Allegiance: Democratic Republic of Vietnam
- Branch: People's Army of Vietnam
- Rank: Army General
- Nicknames: Revolutionary alias, Xuan; Pen name, Truong Son
- Commands: COSVN
- Conflicts: First Indochina War; Vietnam War
- Awards: Gold Star Order; Ho Chi Minh Order; Resolution for Victory Order

Nguyễn Chí Thanh (Vietnamese pronunciation: [ŋwiən˦ˀ˥ t͡ɕi˧˦ tʰajŋ̟˧˧]; 1 January 1914 – 6 July 1967) was a general in the People's Army of Vietnam and communist politician. Nguyễn Chí Thanh was born in Thừa Thiên province in Central Vietnam to a peasant family. His original name was Nguyễn Văn Vịnh. He joined the Indochinese Communist Party in the mid-1930s and apparently spent most of the Second World War in a French prison. He worked for the Party in Central Vietnam until his rise to the Politburo in 1951. During the First Indochina War Thanh was made a general of the People's Army of Vietnam. From 1965 until his death, he served as the leading strategist and military commander of the Central Office for South Vietnam, the southern headquarters of communist military and political operations within South Vietnam. In 1967, he presented plans for what was to become the Tet Offensive to the Politburo, but died shortly after receiving permission to implement his plan.

== Revolutionary cause ==
Nguyễn Chí Thanh was born on January 1, 1914, in the village of Quảng Điền in Thừa Thiên province. Thanh was son of Nguyễn Hán and Trần Thị Thiển, the sixth of 11 children. He grew up in a middle-class family, and was well educated. At the age of 14, his father died, and his family became poor. Thanh then started to work as a farmer.

In 1937, he joined the Communist Party of Vietnam, Thanh became Party Secretary for Thừa Thiên in 1938. From 1938 to 1943, he was arrested many times by the French colonial authorities. After being released from prison he was sent to attend the National People's Congress in Tân Trào (1945). At the Party Congress he was nicknamed Nguyễn Chí Thanh, was elected to the Central Committee of the Communist Party and was appointed Secretary of the Central Committee to monitor and organize the winning Central Government in the August Revolution. From 1945 to 1947 he headed the party's regional committee for Central Vietnam. From 1948 to 1950 he headed the party's zone committee for Zone 4 (the northern half of Central Vietnam).

From 1950 to 1960 he headed the General Political Directorate of the People's Army of Vietnam. He was promoted to membership in the Politburo of the Vietnamese Workers' Party in 1951.

Portrait of Thanh found by American forces at COSVN headquarters

At the Third National Party Congress in 1960 in Hanoi, Thanh was appointed to the Secretariat. In 1961, he was assigned to charge the Agriculture Board of the Party. During the Vietnam War he returned to the military. In 1961, he continuously launched emulation movements in cooperatives, helping to stabilize the development situation in agricultural production in the North. From 1965 to 1967, he was assigned to the South, serving as Secretary of the Central Office for South Vietnam (COSVN), and the Political Commissar of the Liberation Army of South Vietnam (LASV). During this time he took the name of Sáu Vi, when writing newspapers, he often took the pen name Trường Sơn. On the battlefield the LASV adopted the tactic to "Hit the enemies by holding their belts", using proximity to limit the firepower superiority of American troops.

== Death ==
The Vietnamese claim that Thanh died in Hanoi on July 6, 1967, due to a heart attack after a night of heavy drinking after reporting to the Politburo on the situation in the South. The United States claims that Thanh was severely wounded during a B-52 raid on COSVN, evacuated overland to Phnom Penh and then flown to Hanoi where he died of his wounds. According to former Viet Cong deputy regimental commander and chief of staff Dương Đình Lôi, Thanh died when a fallen tree branch struck him near the secret base on Route 30, Long Nguyên just after a B-52 bombing raid, and his body was hurriedly airlifted to Hanoi. In the aftermath of Thanh's death, the party purged dozens of senior members who held more moderate positions in contrast to the more belligerent stance of Lê Duẩn and his allies. Phạm Hùng, another close ally of Lê Duẩn, was appointed to replace Thanh as head of COSVN.

== Bibliography ==
- McGarvey, Patrick J. (1969). Visions of Victory: Selected Vietnamese Communist Military Writings, 1964-1968. Stanford, CA: Hoover Institution. Contains two items published by Nguyen Chi Thanh under his own name and two under the name Truong Son.
- Truong Son (1966). A Bitter Dry Season for the Americans. Hanoi: Foreign Languages Publishing House.
- Dai Tuong Nguyen Chi Thanh voi cuoc khang chien chong My, cuu nuoc. Hanoi: Quan doi nhan dan. 2004. A collection of General Thanh's writings. Despite the title, a significant part of the volume (pp. 345-416) deals with policies toward agriculture and the peasants.
