= Nguyễn Côn =

Vietnamese politician (1916–2022)

Deputy Prime Minister of Vietnam
- In office November 1967 – 2 July 1976
- Prime Minister: Phạm Văn Đồng

Personal details
- Born: 15 May 1916 Thanh Chương District, Annam, French Indochina, France
- Died: 9 January 2022 (aged 105) Hanoi, Vietnam
- Party: Communist Party of Vietnam

Nguyễn Côn (15 May 1916 – 9 January 2022) was a Vietnamese politician.

== Biography ==
He served as Deputy Prime Minister of Vietnam between 1967 and 1976. In October 2021, he celebrated 85 years of membership in the Communist Party of Vietnam. He died on 9 January 2022, at the age of 105.
