= Nguyễn Khang (politician) =

Vietnamese politician

Nguyễn Khang (1919 in Kiến Xương, Thái Bình – 1976 in Hanoi) was a popular Vietnamese communist politician. He was a member of the Standing Committee of the Communist Party of Indochina, Tonkin, Chairman of the Provisional Revolutionary Committee in the North, and General Director of Hanoi during the August revolution in 1945 following the surrender of Japan. Subsequently he was Vietnam's Ambassador to the People's Republic of China.
