= Trần Nam Trung =

Vietnamese general

Colonel General Trần Nam Trung

Defence Minister of Provisional Revolutionary Government of the Republic of South Vietnam
- In office 1969–1976
- Prime Minister: Huỳnh Tấn Phát
- Preceded by: Office established
- Succeeded by: Office merged

Personal details
- Born: Trần Khuy; 6 January 1912 Mộ Đức, Quảng Ngãi, Annam (French protectorate)
- Died: 10 May 2009 (aged 97) Hà Nội, Việt Nam
- Party: Communist Party of Vietnam
- Awards: Gold Star Order; Ho Chi Minh Order
- Nickname(s): Trần Lương, Hai Hậu

Military service
- Allegiance: Democratic Republic of Vietnam and later Republic of South Vietnam
- Branch/service: People's Army of Vietnam
- Rank: Colonel General
- Battles/wars: First Indochina War; Vietnam War

Trần Nam Trung (born Trần Khuy) (1912–2009) was a colonel-general in the People's Army of Vietnam active during the First Indochina War and Vietnam War. He was the unique Defence Minister of Provisional Revolutionary Government of the Republic of South Vietnam.

== Early years ==
Trần Nam Trung was born Trần Khuy in a peasant family in Mộ Đức district, Quảng Ngãi province of the Annam Protectorate, French Indochina in 1912. He joined the Communist Party of Annam in 1927, then the Indochinese Communist Party in 1931.

== Career ==
After Ba Tơ uprising, Trần Nam Trung was appointed to Secretary of the Quảng Ngãi–Bình Định Provincial Party Committee. After August uprising, he held the position of political commissar of War Zone 5 and Buôn Hồ–An Khê front.

Since 1976, Trần Nam Trung left military, was appointed to Chief of Government Inspectorate and kept the position till he retired in 1982. He was promoted to Major General in 1962, and Colonel General in 1974.
