= Trần Quốc Hoàn =

Minister of Public Security of North Vietnam
- In office 1952–1981
- Preceded by: New post

Personal details
- Born: Nguyễn Trọng Cảnh; 23 January 1916 Nam Trung, Nam Đàn District, Nghệ An Province, Vietnam
- Died: 5 September 1986 (aged 70)
- Party: Communist Party of Vietnam

Trần Quốc Hoàn (23 January 1916 – 5 September 1986) was the first and longest-serving Minister of Public Security of North Vietnam. He served in that role from 1952 through unification to 1981. He laid the foundation for structure of Vietnam's security services. He was a member of the Politburo from 1972 until 1980.

== Early life ==
He was born as Nguyễn Trọng Cảnh on 23 January 1916, in Nam Trung village, Nam Đàn District, Nghệ An Province. He participated in the 1930 uprising, and joined the Indochina Communist party in March 1934. During the late 1930s he was involved with the student movement in Huế and Hanoi, as well as various youth organizations. He joined the Indochina Democratic Front (Mặt trận Thống nhất Dân chủ Đông Dương) and was Secretary of the Committee (1937–1939). In May 1940, he was arrested and sent to the prison at Sơn La. Released in May 1945, he continued his revolutionary activities, becoming Party Secretary for Tonkin. In 1951 he was elected to the Party Central Committee and made Deputy Minister of police. On 2 May 1952 he became Director General of Public Security of Vietnam, and the following year the agency's name was changed to Ministry of Security (Bộ Công an) with Trần Quốc Hoàn at its head.

== Minister of Security ==
Trần was known as the Beria of Vietnam, in reference to Lavrentiy Beria, Joseph Stalin's notorious secret police chief.

== Honors ==
A street in the Cầu Giấy District of Hanoi is named after Trần Quốc Hoàn.
