= Nguyễn Văn Trân =

Vietnamese politician

Nguyễn Văn Trân (15 January 1917, Yên Phong, Bắc Ninh, Indochina [now Vietnam] – 7 December 2018) was a Vietnamese politician who served as Secretary of the Party Central Committee, Secretary of the City Party Committee and Chairman of the Hanoi Resistance Committee, Inspector General of the Government and, later, as Minister of Transport and Postal Affairs in the Government of Vietnam.
