= Chu Văn Tấn =

Vietnamese general

Colonel General Chu Văn Tấn

1st Minister of Defence (Vietnam)
- In office 2 September 1945 – 2 March 1946
- Prime Minister: Hồ Chí Minh
- Succeeded by: Phan Anh

Personal details
- Born: May 22, 1909 Võ Nhai, Thái Nguyên, Tonkin (French protectorate)
- Died: 22 May 1984 (aged 75) Hà Nội, Việt Nam
- Party: Communist Party of Vietnam

Military service
- Allegiance: Democratic Republic of Vietnam and later Vietnam
- Branch/service: People's Army of Vietnam
- Rank: Colonel General
- Battles/wars: First Indochina War; Vietnam War

Chu Văn Tấn (1909–1984) was a colonel-general in the People's Army of Vietnam active during the First Indochina War. He was the first Minister of Defence of Vietnam.

== Early years ==
Tấn was born in Võ Nhai district, Thái Nguyên province of the Tonkin Protectorate, French Indochina in May 1909.

In 1934, he participated in building the revolutionary movement and directed guerrilla warfare in Tràng Xá, Võ Nhai, Bắc Sơn

In 1935, Hoàng Văn Thụ, a member of the Central Committee of the Communist Party of Vietnam, arrived to establish a base and form a joint Communist Party cell spanning the districts of Võ Nhai and Bắc Sơn. He was invited to participate in the cell's activities, even though he was not yet a Party member.

He joined the Indochinese Communist Party in 1936 under the pseudonym Tân Hồng.

== Career ==
Tấn was a member of the 1st Central Committee of the Communist Party of Vietnam and Minister of Defense in the 1945 provisional cabinet of the DRV.

From 1949 to 1954, Tấn was the chief of Interregional, secretary zone party committee, Tribunal president of Military court, president of administrative committee of Việt Bắc Interzone.
