= Phạm Hùng =

Vietnamese politician

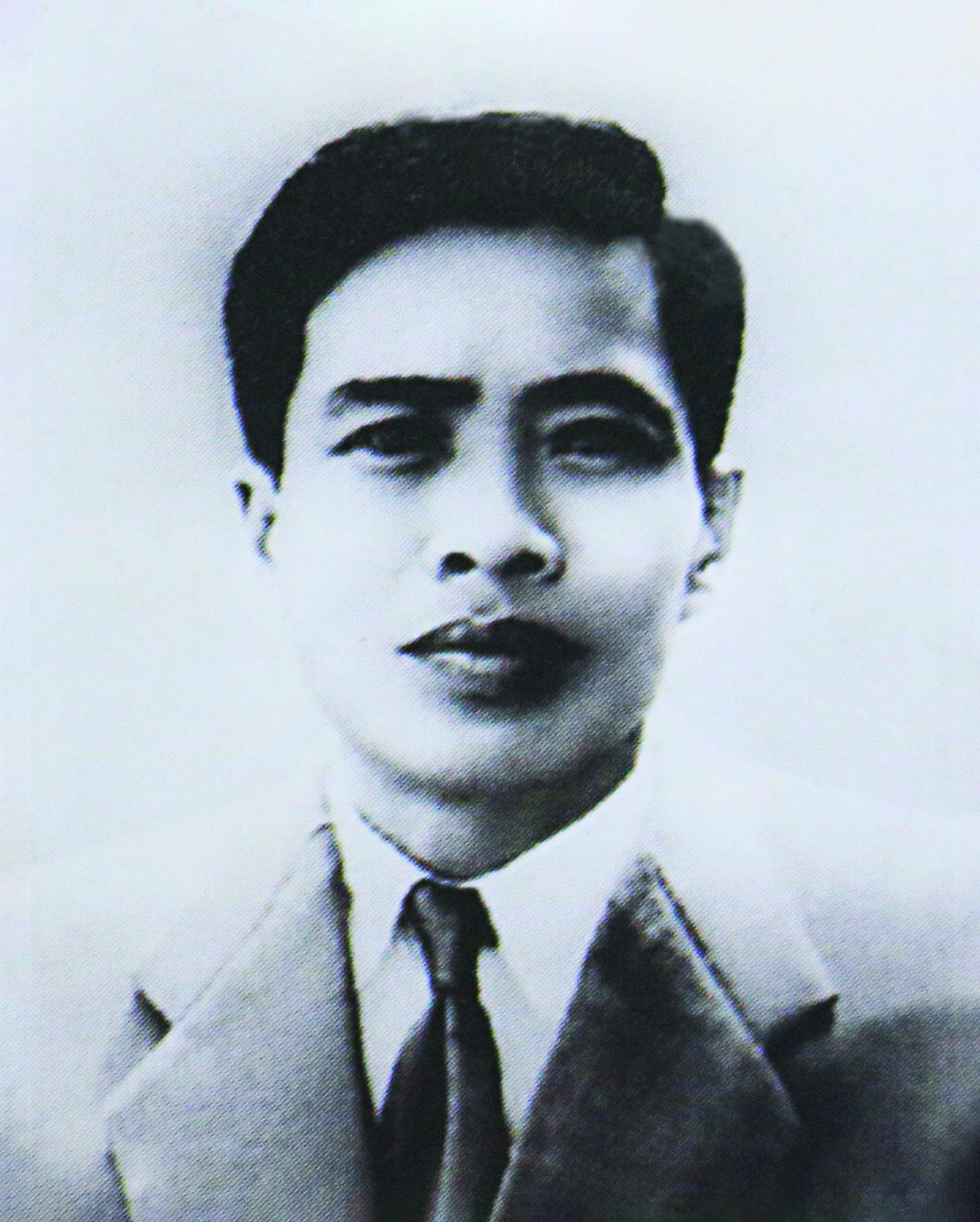

2nd Chairman of the Council of Ministers
- In office 18 June 1987 – 10 March 1988
- President: Võ Chí Công
- Preceded by: Phạm Văn Đồng
- Succeeded by: Võ Văn Kiệt (acting)

Personal details
- Born: 11 June 1912; Vĩnh Long Province, French Indochina
- Died: 10 March 1988 (aged 75); Ho Chi Minh City, Vietnam
- Party: Communist Party of Vietnam (1930–1988)

Military service
- Branch/service: Vietnam People's Public Security
- Rank: Police senior colonel

Phạm Hùng (Note: In this Vietnamese name, the surname is Phạm, but is often simplified to Pham in English-language text. In accordance with Vietnamese custom, this person should be referred to by the given name, Hùng.) (Vietnamese: [faːm˧˨ʔ hʊwŋ͡m˨˩]; 11 June 1912 – 10 March 1988) was a South Vietnamese politician and the second Prime Minister of the Socialist Republic of Vietnam from 1987 to 1988.

== Life ==
Hùng was born on 11 June 1912, in Vĩnh Long Province, in the Mekong River Delta of southern Vietnam. He was a member of the Communist Party of Indochina since 1930. The following year, he was arrested by the French colonial authorities for killing a landowner and sentenced to death. His sentence was converted into a prison sentence. In 1936, he was amnestied. He was arrested again in 1939 and remained imprisoned until 1945 on the infamous prison island Poulo Condore. Hùng is described as one of the leaders of the communist prisoners during his imprisonment. After getting out of prison in 1945 he promptly became a member of the Nam Bo Regional Committee, the organization controlling the Communist Party in the southern part of Vietnam (also called Cochinchina). During the First Indochina War, he was one of the active party leaders in the south of the country and although in a formally subordinate position, controlled large sections of the Viet Minh security forces in the south. In 1951, Hùng was appointed a member of the Central Committee of the party. At that time or soon after he became a member and deputy secretary of the Central Committee Southern Branch, the organization that the Americans later called COSVN.

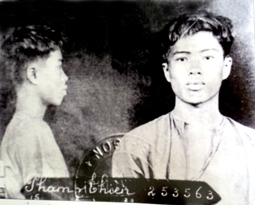
Hùng as a prisoner of the French colonialists in 1932

After the 1954 Geneva Accords separated North and South Vietnam, Hùng was ordered in 1955 to Hanoi. In 1957, he became a member of the Politburo of the party. From 1956 to 1958 he headed the Central Reunification Committee. He was closely allied with Lê Duẩn who by early 1964 had become the effective leader of North Vietnam. Lê Duẩn and his supporters adopted a more belligerent approach to the armed struggle in South Vietnam in contrast to moderates such as Ho Chi Minh and Võ Nguyên Giáp.

In July 1967, after the mysterious death of Lê Duẩn ally Nguyễn Chí Thanh, under the code name Bay Cuong, Hùng became secretary (head) of COSVN. In this position he is sometimes described as having been political commissar to the Viet Cong.

After the war, Hùng returned to his role in the Politburo. In 1979, he became Minister of the Interior. In 1987, he took over the post of prime minister after the withdrawal of Phạm Văn Đồng.

== Notes ==
Preceded by Phạm Văn Đồng - acting	Prime Minister of Vietnam 1987–1988	Succeeded by Võ Văn Kiệt - acting
