= Order of Ho Chi Minh =

Order of Ho Chi Minh Huân chương Hồ Chí Minh
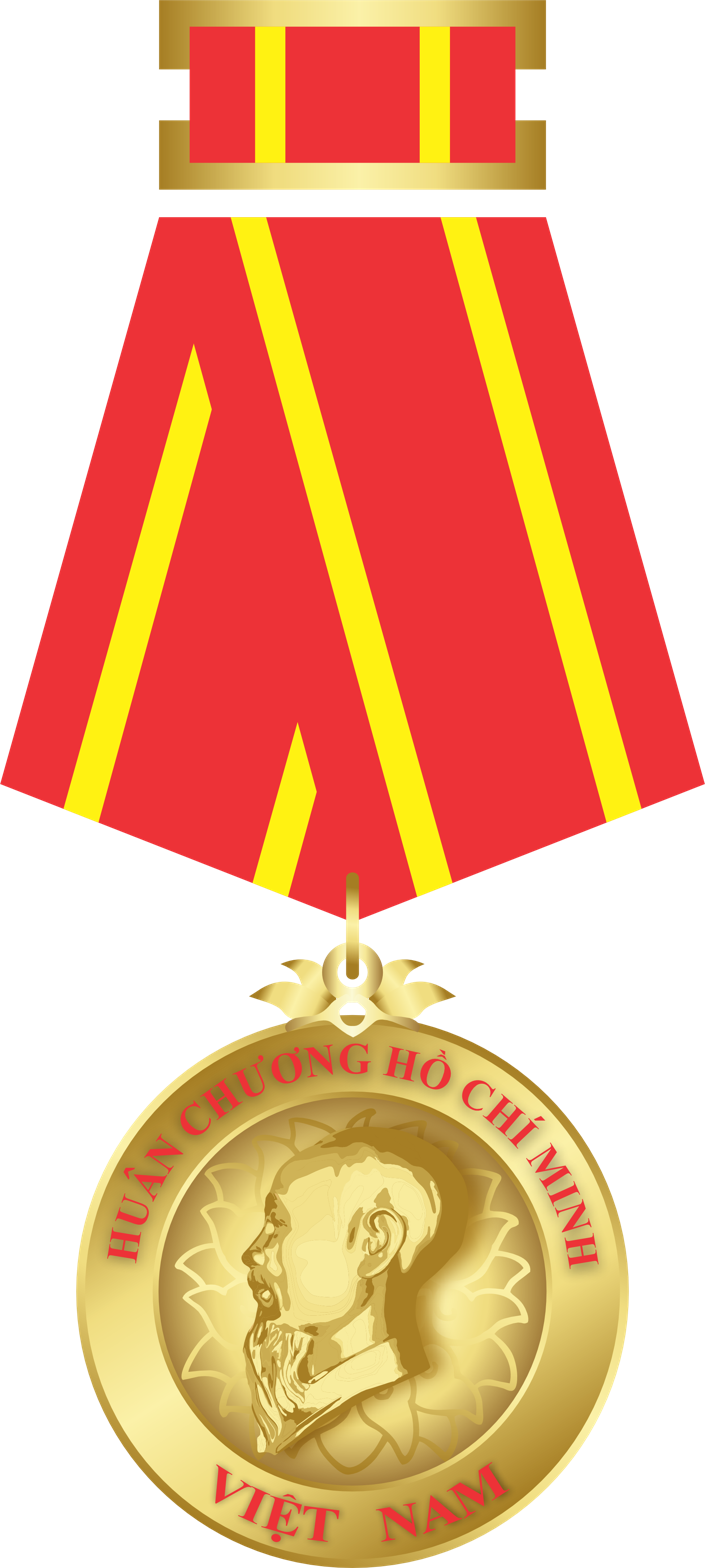
- Type: Single-grade order
- Awarded for: Outstanding achievements in one of the areas of politics, economics, literature, arts, science, technology, national defense, security, diplomacy or other fields.
- Presented by: the Government of Vietnam
- Eligibility: Vietnamese civilians, military personnel, and organization. Foreigners.
- Status: Currently awarded
- Established: 6 June 1947

Precedence
- Next (higher): Gold Star Order
- Next (lower): Order of Independence

The Order of Ho Chi Minh (Vietnamese: Huân chương Hồ Chí Minh) is a decoration of the Socialist Republic of Vietnam that was first instituted on 6 June 1947. The creator of the order was the president Hồ Chí Minh.

The Order of Ho Chi Minh is conferred or posthumously conferred on individuals who have rendered great meritorious services, recorded numerous outstanding achievements in one of the political, economic, social, literature, art, scientific, technological, defense, security, diplomatic or other domains.

When first instituted, the Ho Chi Minh Order had three classes, but since 1981 the Order has become a single one. Currently, the Ho Chi Minh Order is the second highest national order of the Socialist Republic of Vietnam (after the Gold Star). The Order is bestowed on citizens who have rendered outstanding services to the State, or members of the Vietnamese People's Armed Forces for acts of bravery in action against an enemy force. The decoration may also be awarded to cities, regions, collectives, military units and ships for the same reasons.

== Gallery ==
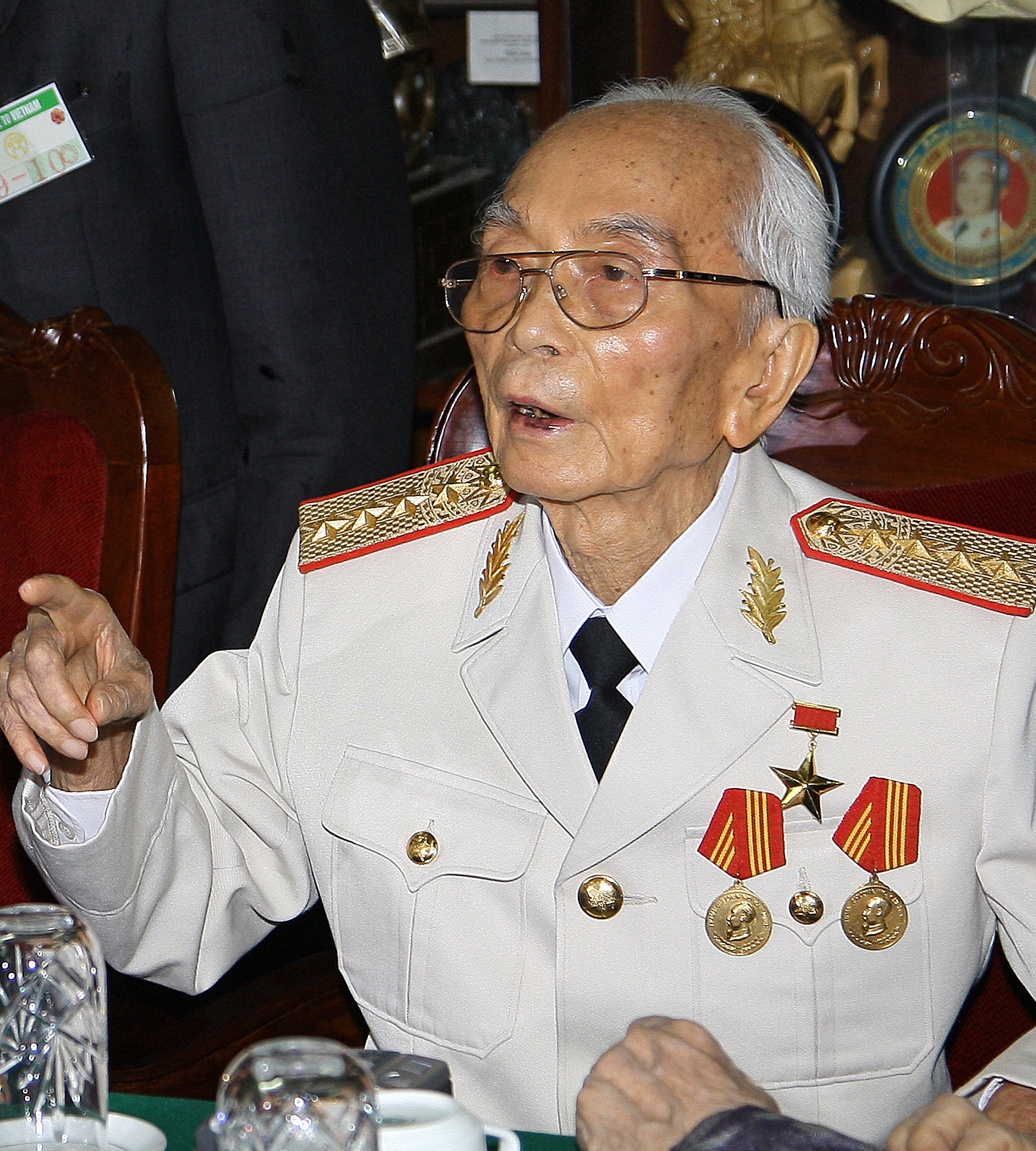
Võ Nguyên Giáp wearing two Ho Chi Minh Orders

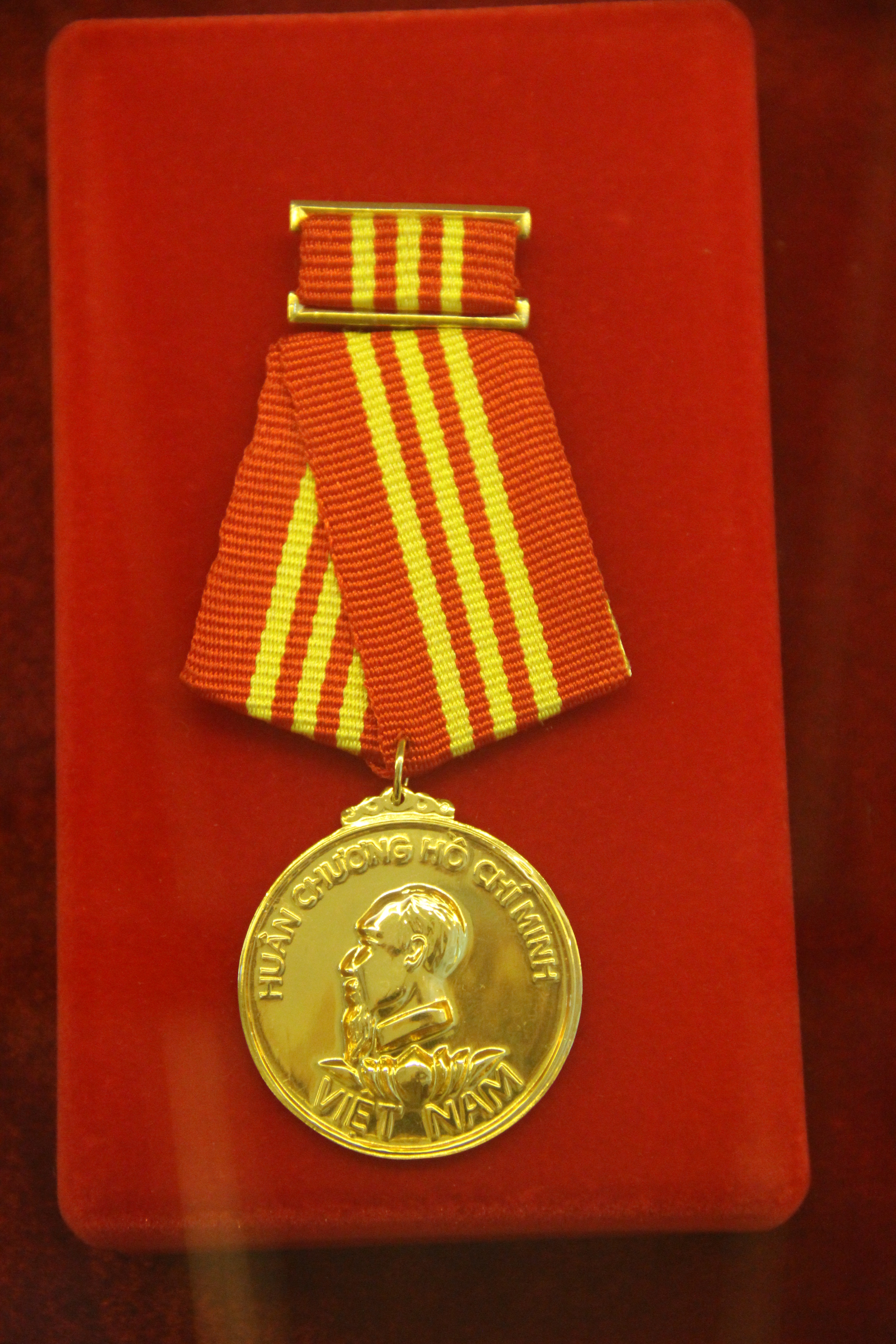
Pre-2003 design Ho Chi Minh Order displayed at Weapons Museum, Hanoi

== See also ==
- Vietnam awards and decorations
