= Vo Thi My Linh =

Vietnamese writer

- Born: Vo Thi My Linh; 25 April 1989 (age 37); Huong Van- Huong Tra - Thua Thien Hue Province, Vietnam
- Education: Master's in International Development, Duke University, Bachelor of Journalism, Human University of Social Sciences and Humanities, Vietnam
- Occupations: Writer, Founder of VHV

Vo Thi My Linh is a Vietnamese writer and the founder of Volunteer House Vietnam.

Her prominence further increased following a letter to the Minister of Education in which she advocated for enhanced English education programs in Vietnam.

In 2015, Linh published her first novel, Over the Hill (Vietnamese: Bên kia đồi), and co-authored ten books of short stories for teenagers.

Linh is also the founder of Volunteer House Vietnam, a non-profit organization that connects travelers with Vietnamese children learning English.

== Life story ==
Linh was born and raised in central Vietnam. Her father worked as a bomb sawyer, harvesting unexploded ordnance after the war as a means of survival. He extracted TNT from bombs to use for fishing bait, while the outer shells were sold as scrap metal. He was injured by a bomb on a nearby hill, an accident that required a corneal graft and a six‐month recovery period. The incident had a profound impact on her family. Linh remarked, "It was not a big deal though. The big deal is that every year, around 4,000 people in Vietnam are severely injured and die due to accidents with explosives. The danger is not a deterrent for bomb sawyers, who regard it as their only source of income. It is ridiculous, isn't it?"

=== Nepal avalanche survivor ===
In 2014, an avalanche on Annapurna in Nepal killed at least 43 of the 168 trekkers. Linh survived the incident and helped save the life of a porter. She explained, "Sometimes, life is a pile of shit. To find faith, somebody has to climb up the mountain to see a flower which blooms on stone and realize that life is still beautiful."

When young people expressed admiration for her, Linh noted, "Climbing a mountain doesn't mean you are strong. The women who stay at home and take care of their family every day are really strong women."

=== Letter to the Minister of Education ===
Having once struggled with English, Linh was aware of the disadvantages faced by those who did not speak the language. While volunteering in Aruchour village—a remote area in Nepal—she observed that local people spoke English well despite their poverty. After spending an entire day in a primary school library reading a Nepalese English textbook, she compared it with the textbooks used in Vietnam and concluded that the Vietnamese versions were deficient. Consequently, she wrote a letter to the Minister of Education, which she later published on Facebook. The letter received more than 24,000 "likes" and over 10,000 shares, eventually going viral. Linh stated, "I still don't know why people appreciated me after that. I suppose that anybody can write a letter like me, to say anything they want to say. That was not bravery. That was a type of freedom of speech."

=== Founder of Volunteer House Vietnam ===
Linh founded Volunteer House Vietnam, a non-profit organization that provides free accommodations for foreign travelers in exchange for free English lessons for underprivileged children. The organization aims to establish at least one free English class in each province of Vietnam by 2020, focusing especially on disadvantaged children aged 9–12 years.

Explaining her focus on English, Linh recalled her time in Nepal, noting that people in deep poverty spoke English well despite lacking modern amenities. She added, "As a person who is not very good at English, I see those who are good at the language having the chance to land well-paid jobs in Vietnam. I don't want language to be a barrier for Vietnamese people." She further stated, "Our target is not how many VHV students we teach but raising people's awareness of how important English is. When people understand the language's importance, they will learn it voluntarily."

Volunteer House Vietnam has since registered over 2,000 volunteers from across the country, provided 80 free accommodations in 20 provinces, and established four English classes in both Ho Chi Minh City and Hanoi.

With growing community support, Linh believes that Vietnamese children will soon be able to communicate confidently in English, opening the door to global opportunities.

=== Writing career ===
Linh began writing at an early age and later became a journalist, novelist, and co-author of ten collections of short stories for teenagers. Her first writing assignment was drafting a divorce agreement for her mother, which she believed was necessary to protect her from domestic violence—a common issue in rural Vietnam where many women hesitate to divorce due to societal judgment and the normalization of abuse. In 2015, Linh published her first novel, Over the Hill (Vietnamese: Bên kia đồi). The novel tells the story of Nu, a young woman with a unique perspective. Growing up near a hill reputed to be haunted by the souls of soldiers from the American War, Nu was initially afraid to approach it. However, as she matured and became disillusioned with the mundane lives of those around her, she left her job to travel in search of meaning. During her journey— which included a troubling encounter with a monk—Nu eventually returned to her home village. Climbing the hill, she discovered a new perspective: although the view revealed no ghosts or miraculous blooms, it allowed her to see the enduring beauty of her village, symbolizing her personal growth and maturity. The novel received positive reviews from critics.

== Comments ==
=== Regarding the letter to the Minister ===
Former Deputy Prime Minister Vũ Khoan stated, "I was very impressed by Linh. When her letter became famous on social media, some blamed the Minister of Education for it. However, in an interview, Linh said, 'I don't want to blame the Minister because my English was not good. I blame myself first because I didn't try everything to learn it. Don't blame anyone if you can't take ownership of your own life. My father taught me, 'Your life is yours, not mine!'"

Dr. Nguyen Lan Dung, a professor of biology, commented, "I agree with Linh's points about English in Vietnam. If Linh studied Biology, I would be willing to invite her for some type of collaboration."

Senior journalist Le Thanh Phong remarked, "Linh's letter attracted attention because of the beauty in her heart and her sense of civic responsibility. A young woman quit her job to travel—not for sightseeing—but to study English textbooks from another country and share her findings with the Vietnamese people. There are many who are more fluent in English than Linh, but none promote the language in the same way because they do not see it as their responsibility. Many complain about a lack of patriotism, yet they ultimately neglect their country."

=== Regarding the novel: Over the Hill ===
Literary critic, researcher, and translator Phan Nhat Chieu wrote, "This novel is like the prelude of a musical piece—full of excitement, strong personality, and experience, all accompanied by a natural, profound tone."

Book reviewer Ho Huong Giang of the Vietnamnet Online Newspaper stated, "The fascination of this novel is that society is truthfully depicted through the perspective of a child—much like the child in Hans Christian Andersen's 'The Emperor's New Clothes,' who dares to speak his mind in front of everyone. In this novel, Nu—a child full of questions—discovers many flaws in the adults around her, which leads her to leave her country. However, in the end, she returns and accepts those imperfections, realizing that she has become an adult."

== Rotary Peace Fellow ==
In 2018, Linh received a full scholarship at Duke University to study international development policy. The scholarship was sponsored by the Rotary Foundation. During her time in the United States, she actively engaged with various Rotary clubs and was invited to speak at numerous Rotary events and conferences.
