= Võ Nguyên Giáp =

Vietnamese general and communist politician (1911–2013)

General Võ Nguyên Giáp
- Giáp in 1957

Secretary of the Central Military Commission of the Communist Party
- In office 1946–1978
- Succeeded by: Lê Duẩn (as General Secretary)

Commander-in-Chief of the People's Army of Vietnam
- In office 2 March 1946 – 30 April 1975
- Deputy: Vũ Hồng Khanh (1946)
- Preceded by: Office established
- Succeeded by: Ho Chi Minh, Tôn Đức Thắng (as President of Vietnam)

Deputy Chairman of the Council of the Ministers
- In office 20 September 1955 – August 1991
- President: Ho Chi Minh; Tôn Đức Thắng; Trường Chinh; Võ Chí Công
- Prime Minister: Phạm Văn Đồng; Phạm Hùng; Đỗ Mười
- Succeeded by: Phan Văn Khải

Minister of Defence
- In office 1948–1980
- Prime Minister: Ho Chi Minh; Phạm Văn Đồng
- Preceded by: Tạ Quang Bửu
- Succeeded by: Văn Tiến Dũng
- In office 11 May 1946 – 8 May 1947
- Prime Minister: Ho Chi Minh
- Preceded by: Phan Anh
- Succeeded by: Tạ Quang Bửu

Personal details
- Born: 25 August 1911 Lệ Thủy, Quảng Bình, Annam, French Indochina
- Died: 4 October 2013 (aged 102) Hanoi, Vietnam
- Party: Tân Việt Revolutionary Party (1923–1930); Communist Party of Vietnam (1930–2013)
- Spouses: Nguyễn Thị Quang Thái (m. 1938; died 1944); Đặng Bích Hà (m. 1946)
- Children: 5
- Education: Indochinese University

Military service
- Allegiance: Viet Minh (1944–1945); North Vietnam (1945–1976); Vietnam (1976–1992)
- Branch/service: People’s Army of Vietnam
- Years of service: 1944–1992
- Rank: Army general
- Battles/wars: World War II; Battles of Khai Phat and Na Ngan; August Revolution; Battle of Thái Nguyên; First Indochina War; Battle of Hanoi (1946); Operation Léa; Battle of Route Coloniale 4; Battle of Vĩnh Yên; Battle of Mạo Khê; Battle of the Day River; Battle of Hòa Bình; Second Battle of Nghĩa Lộ; Battle of Nà Sản; Upper Laos campaign; Lower Laos and Northeast Cambodia campaign; Battle of Dien Bien Phu; Second Indochina War; Tet Offensive; Battle of Khe Sanh; Easter Offensive; 1975 spring offensive; Fall of Saigon; FULRO insurgency; Third Indochina War; Cambodian–Vietnamese War; Sino-Vietnamese War; Sino-Vietnamese conflicts (1979–1991); Vietnamese border raids in Thailand; Thai-Laotian Border War
- Awards: Gold Star Order; Ho Chi Minh Order (2); Military Exploit Order (2); Fatherland Defense Order; Feat Order; Resolution for Victory Order (6)
- Vietnamese alphabet: Võ Nguyên Giáp

Võ Nguyên Giáp ( chữ Hán: 武元甲, Vietnamese pronunciation: [vɔ̌ˀ ŋʷīən jǎːp]; 25 August 1911 – 4 October 2013) was a Vietnamese general, communist revolutionary and politician. Highly regarded as a military strategist, Giáp led Vietnamese communist military forces to victory in the decades-long Indochina wars. Giáp was the military commander of the Việt Minh and the People's Army from 1941 to 1972, minister of defense of the Democratic Republic of Vietnam (North Vietnam) and the Socialist Republic of Vietnam in 1946–1947 and from 1948 to 1980, and deputy prime minister from 1955 to 1991. He was a member of the Politburo of the Communist Party of Vietnam.

Born in Quảng Bình province to an affluent peasant family, Giáp began participating in anti-colonial political activity in 1925. Sources conflict as to whether he joined the Indochinese Communist Party in 1930, or not until 1940. Giáp rose to prominence during World War II as the military leader of the Việt Minh resistance against the Japanese occupation, and after the war led anti-colonial forces in the First Indochina War against the French. He won a decisive victory at the 1954 Battle of Dien Bien Phu, which ended the war. In the Vietnam War, Giáp led the PAVN against South Vietnam and the United States. Giáp was commander of the army during the 1968 Tet Offensive and 1972 Easter Offensive, after which he was succeeded by Văn Tiến Dũng, but remained defense minister through the U.S. withdrawal and final victory against South Vietnam in 1975. Giáp oversaw his final campaigns in the successful Vietnamese invasion of Cambodia in 1978 and the 1979 Sino-Vietnamese War. He resigned as defense minister in 1980 and left the Politburo in 1982. Giáp remained on the Central Committee and as deputy prime minister until 1991, and died in 2013 at age 102.

Giáp is widely regarded as a gifted military leader. During the First Indochina War, he transformed a disorganized band of rebels to a "fine light-infantry army" fielding cryptography, artillery and advanced logistics capable of challenging the larger, modernised French Far East Expeditionary Corps and Vietnamese National Army. Giáp, who in the 1930s had studied law and worked as a history teacher, had never received any military training prior to World War II. A highly effective logistician, he was the principal architect of the Ho Chi Minh trail, the logistical network from North to South Vietnam, through the kingdoms of Laos and Cambodia, which is recognised as one of the 20th century's great feats of military engineering.

Giáp is often credited with North Vietnam's military victory over the United States and South Vietnam. He was crucial to the transformation of the PAVN into "one of the largest, most formidable" mechanised and combined-arms fighting force capable of defeating the Army of the Republic of Vietnam (ARVN) in conventional warfare.

== Biography ==
=== Early life ===
Võ Nguyên Giáp was born on 25 August 1911 (or 1912 according to some sources) in Quảng Bình province, Annam, French Indochina. Giáp's father and mother, Võ Quang Nghiêm and Nguyễn Thị Kiên, worked the land, rented some to neighbours, and lived a relatively comfortable life.

Giáp's father was both a minor official and a committed Vietnamese nationalist, having participated in the Cần Vương movement in the 1880s. He was arrested for subversive activities by the French colonial authorities in 1919 and died in prison a few weeks later. Giáp had two sisters and one brother, and soon after his father's incarceration, one of his sisters was also arrested. Although she was not held for long, the privations of prison life made her ill and she too died a few weeks after being released.

Giáp was taught at home by his father before going to the village school. His precocious intelligence meant that he was soon transferred to the district school and in 1924, at the age of thirteen, he left home to attend the Quốc Học (also known in English as the "National Academy"), a French-run lycée in Huế, where he studied arithmetic, history, geography, literature, and natural science. This school had been founded by a Catholic official named Ngo Dinh Kha, and his son, Ngô Đình Diệm also attended it. Diem later became President of South Vietnam (1955–63). Years earlier the same school had educated another boy, Nguyễn Sinh Cung, also the son of an official. In 1943 Cung adopted the name Ho Chi Minh.

At age 14, Giáp became a messenger for the Haiphong Power Company. He was expelled from the school after two years for taking part in protests, and went home to his village for a while. While there, he joined the Tân Việt Revolutionary Party, an underground group founded in 1924, which introduced him to communism. He returned to Hue and continued his political activities. He was arrested in 1930 for taking part in student protests and served 13 months of a two-year sentence at Lao Bảo Prison. By Giáp's own account the reason for his release was lack of evidence against him. He joined the Communist Party of Vietnam in 1931 and took part in several demonstrations against French rule in Indochina as well as assisting in founding the Democratic Front in 1933.

Although he denied it, Giáp was said by the historian Cecil B. Currey to have also spent some time in the prestigious Hanoi Lycée Albert Sarraut, where the local elite was educated to serve the colonial regime. He was said to have been in the same class as Phạm Văn Đồng, a future Prime Minister, who also denied studying at Albert Sarraut, and Bảo Đại, the last Emperor of Annam. From 1933 to 1938, Giáp studied at the Indochinese University in Hanoi where he earned a bachelor's degree in law with a major in political economy.

=== Political activism ===
While a student, Giáp had taken lodgings with Professor Dang Thai Minh, whose daughter, Nguyen Thi Minh Giang (also cited as Nguyễn Thị Quang Thái; 1915–1944), he had first met at school in Hue. She too had learned nationalism from her father and had joined the revolutionary activities with which Giáp was involved. In June 1938 (or, according to some sources, April 1939) they were married and in May 1939 they had a daughter, Hong Anh (Red Queen of Flowers). Giáp's busy political activities took a toll on his postgraduate studies, and he failed to pass the examinations for the Certificate of Administrative Law. Unable therefore to practice as a lawyer, he took a job as a history teacher at the Thăng Long School in Hanoi.

As well as teaching in school, Giáp was busy producing and writing articles for Tiếng Dân (Voice of the People) founded by Huỳnh Thúc Kháng and many other revolutionary newspapers, while actively participating in various revolutionary movements. All the while, Giáp was a dedicated reader of military history and philosophy, revering Sun Tzu. He also made a particular study of Napoleon's generalship, and greatly admired T. E. Lawrence's Seven Pillars of Wisdom, learning from it practical examples of how to apply minimum military force to maximum effect. He also read and was influenced by historical figures including Carl von Clausewitz, George Washington, and Vladimir Lenin. During the Popular Front years in France, he founded Hồn Trẻ tập mới (Soul of Youth), an underground socialist newspaper. He also founded the French-language paper Le Travail (on which Phạm Văn Đồng also worked).

After the signing of the Molotov–Ribbentrop Pact, the French authorities outlawed the Indochinese Communist Party. Its leaders decided that Giáp should leave Vietnam and go into exile in China. On 3 May 1940 he said farewell to his wife, left Hanoi and crossed the border into China. Giáp's wife went to her family home in Vinh, where she was arrested, sentenced to fifteen years imprisonment, and incarcerated in the Hoa Lo Central Prison in Hanoi. In China, Giáp joined up with Ho Chi Minh, then an adviser to the People's Liberation Army. Giáp adopted the alias Duong Huai-nan, learned to speak and write Chinese, and studied the strategy and tactics of the Chinese Communist Party.

In September 1940, Vichy France agreed to the Japanese occupation of Vietnam, to 'protect' Indochina. In May 1941 the Eighth Congress of the Indochinese Communist Party decided to form the Viet Minh; Giáp was made responsible for establishing an intelligence network and organising political bases in the far north of the country. To begin propaganda work among the population, a news-sheet called Việt Nam Độc Lập was produced. Giáp wrote many articles for it, and was repeatedly criticised by Ho Chi Minh for the excessive verbosity of his writing style.

=== Military career ===
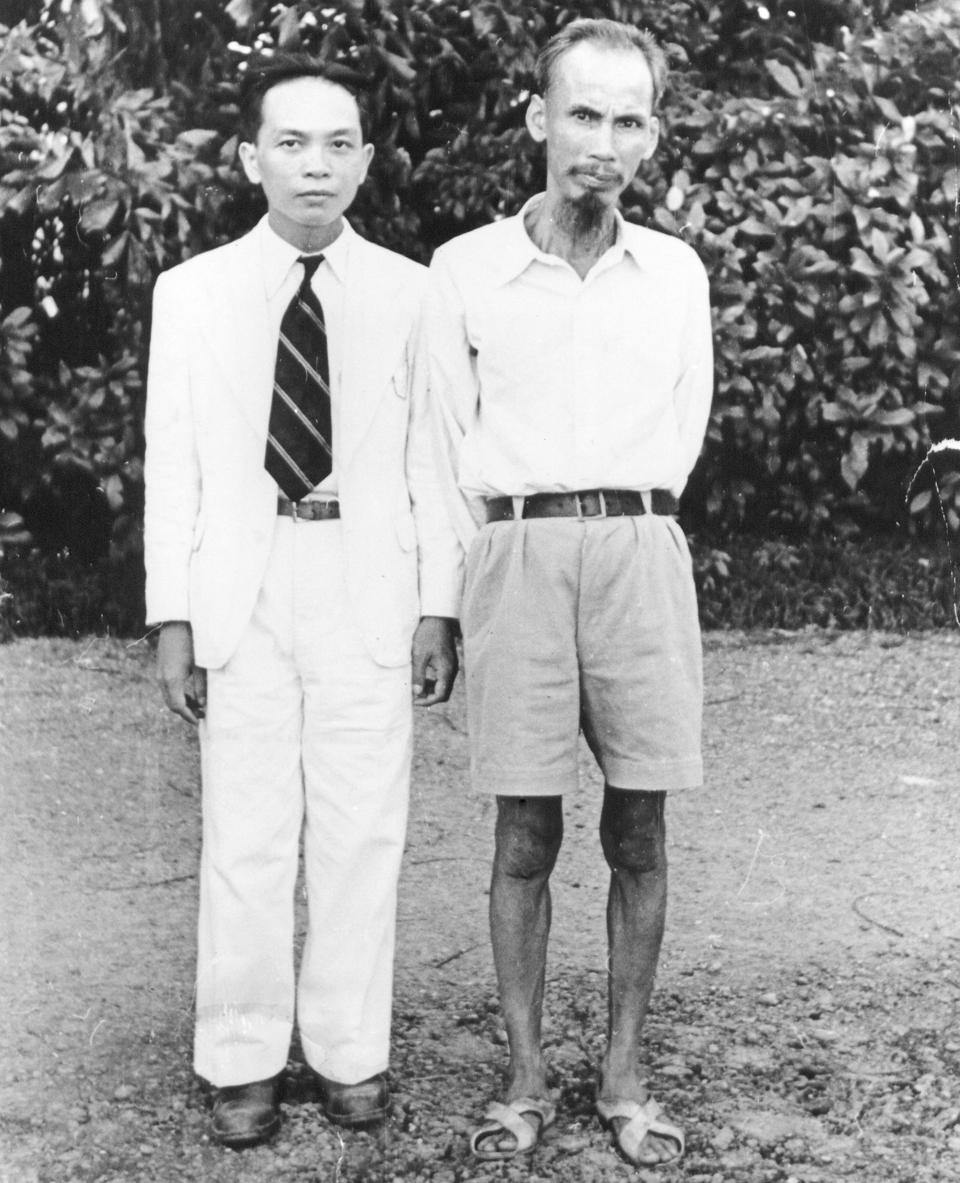
Võ Nguyên Giáp and Ho Chi Minh in 1945

In 1942, Giáp and about forty men moved back into Vietnam and established themselves in remote caves near the village of Vu Nhai. This and similar small groups in the mountains were the basis of the Viet Minh, the armed wing of the Vietnam Independence League. The local Nùng people spoke little Vietnamese, so Giáp and his colleagues had to learn local dialects and draw pictures to communicate. When Vichy security patrols approached, they would conceal themselves in a cave under a waterfall, or, at times, in the lands of the Man Trang people.

For the next few years he and his comrades worked steadily to build up a small military force and to win local people over to the communist cause. By the end of 1943 several hundred men and women had joined the Viet Minh. It was in the summer of 1943 that Giáp was told that his wife had been beaten to death by guards in the central prison in Hanoi. Her sister was guillotined.

In September 1944 the first Revolutionary Party Military Conference was held and it was agreed that the time was now right to take the military struggle forward into a new phase. The formation of the Vietnam Liberation army was proclaimed, with Giáp as its commander. Ho Chi Minh directed him to establish Armed Propaganda Brigades and the first one, consisting of thirty-one men and three women, was formed in December 1944. Named the Tran Hung Dao Platoon after the great Vietnamese hero, it was armed with two revolvers, seventeen rifles, one light machine gun, and fourteen breech-loading flintlocks dating from the Russo-Japanese War.

Ho Chi Minh decided that for propaganda purposes, the Armed Propaganda Unit had to win a military victory within a month of being established, so on 25 December 1944 Giáp led successful attacks against French outposts in the Battles of Khai Phat and Na Ngan. Two French lieutenants were killed and the Vietnamese soldiers in the outposts surrendered. The Viet Minh attackers suffered no casualties. A few weeks later, Giáp was wounded in the leg when his group attacked another outpost at Dong Mu.

Through the first half of 1945, Giáp's military position strengthened as the political position of the French and Japanese weakened. On 9 March the Japanese removed the titular French regime and placed the emperor Bảo Đại at the head of a puppet state, the Empire of Vietnam.

By April the Viet Minh had nearly five thousand members, and was able to attack Japanese posts with confidence. Between May and August 1945, the United States, keen to support anti-Japanese forces in mainland Asia, actively supplied and trained Giáp and the Viet Minh. Major Archimedes Patti, in charge of the so-called 'Deer Team' unit, taught the Viet Minh to use flamethrowers, grenade launchers and machine guns.

In a single month they succeeded in training around 200 hand-picked future leaders of the army they were to oppose a few decades later. Growing stronger, Giáp's forces took more territory and captured more towns up until the announcement on 15 August by the Japanese Emperor of his country's unconditional surrender to the allies.

On 28 August 1945, Giáp led his men into Hanoi, and on 2 September, Ho Chi Minh declared the independence of the Democratic Republic of Vietnam. He formed a new government, with Giáp as Minister of the Interior. Unbeknownst to the Việt Minh, President Harry S. Truman, Prime Minister Winston Churchill and Premier Joseph Stalin had already decided the future of postwar Vietnam at a summit meeting at Potsdam. They agreed that the country would be occupied temporarily to get the Japanese out; the northern half would be under the control of the Republic of China and the southern half under the British.

On 9 September, the Republic of China forces crossed the border and quickly took control of the north, while on 12 September, the British Indian Army arrived in Saigon. By October French forces had begun to arrive in Vietnam, and the British handed control of the south back to them and in May 1946, an agreement between the French and the Chinese saw the Chinese withdraw from the north and the French move in there as well. Ho Chi Minh and Võ Nguyên Giáp pursued lengthy negotiations with the French, seeking to avoid an all-out war to cement their independence. Giáp led the Vietnamese delegation at the Dalat conference in April 1946, which yielded nothing, and, returning to Hanoi, he was made Minister of Defense. Ho Chi Minh departed for France on 31 May, to negotiate with the French at Fontainebleau, and he remained in France until November.

With Ho in France, Giáp was effectively in charge of the government in Hanoi. Up to then, the Democratic Republic of Vietnam had allowed nationalist and other newspapers to publish, but when they began attacking and vilifying the government, he cracked down on them and closed them all. He also deployed Viet Minh forces against non-communist nationalist troops in the suburbs of Hanoi, and had their leaders arrested and imprisoned. During this period he also began a relationship with a famous and beautiful dancer, Thuong Huyen, and was seen in public with her at nightclubs. This conduct caused serious concern in the upper ranks of the Party as it was contrary to the very strict and abstemious moral code by which all members were expected to abide. Wanting to protect him, Ho Chi Minh arranged for him to meet a graduate from a well-known family, Đặng Bích Hà (1928–2024).

They married in August 1946, and went on to have five children.

==== First Indochina War ====
The tense standoff between the Vietnamese government and the French occupiers escalated dramatically on 23 October when the French commander Argenlieu ordered the cruiser Suffren to bombard Haiphong in response to repeated skirmishes with Vietnamese forces as they tried to bring arms and contraband into the port. Around six thousand people were killed, and fourteen thousand wounded in the bombardment. Giáp, acting as de facto president in the absence of Ho Chi Minh, tried to maintain some kind of peace but by the time Ho returned in November, both sides were on a war footing. Local fighting broke out repeatedly and on 27 November, Ho's government, concluding that it could not hold Hanoi against the French, retreated up into the northern mountains where it had been based two years previously. On 19 December, the Vietnamese government officially declared war on France and fighting erupted all over the country. After this time, detailed information on Giáp's personal life becomes much scarcer and in most sources the emphasis is on his military achievements and, later, on his political work.

The first few years of the war involved mostly a low-level, semi-conventional resistance fight against the French occupying forces. Võ Nguyên Giáp first saw real fighting at Nha Trang, when he traveled to south-central Vietnam in January–February 1946, to convey the determination of leaders in Hanoi to resist the French. In 1947, though French ambitious armored, amphibious, and airborne drives had plunged into the northern mountains and along the Annam coast, Viet Minh sabotage and raids along lines of communication had mounted steadily, and the French had come to realize that France had lost the military initiative.

French Union forces included colonial troops from many parts of the former French empire (Moroccan, Algerian, Tunisian, Laotian, Cambodian, Vietnamese and Vietnamese ethnic minorities), French professional troops and units of the French Foreign Legion. The use of metropolitan recruits (i.e. recruits from France itself) was forbidden by French governments to prevent the war from becoming even more unpopular at home. It was called the "dirty war" (la sale guerre) by supporters of the Left in France and intellectuals (including Jean-Paul Sartre) during the Henri Martin affair in 1950.

When it became clear that France was becoming involved in a drawn-out and so far unsuccessful war, the French government tried to negotiate an agreement with the Viet Minh. They offered to help set up a national government and promised that they would eventually grant Vietnam its independence. Ho Chi Minh and the other leaders of the Viet Minh did not trust the word of the French and continued the war.

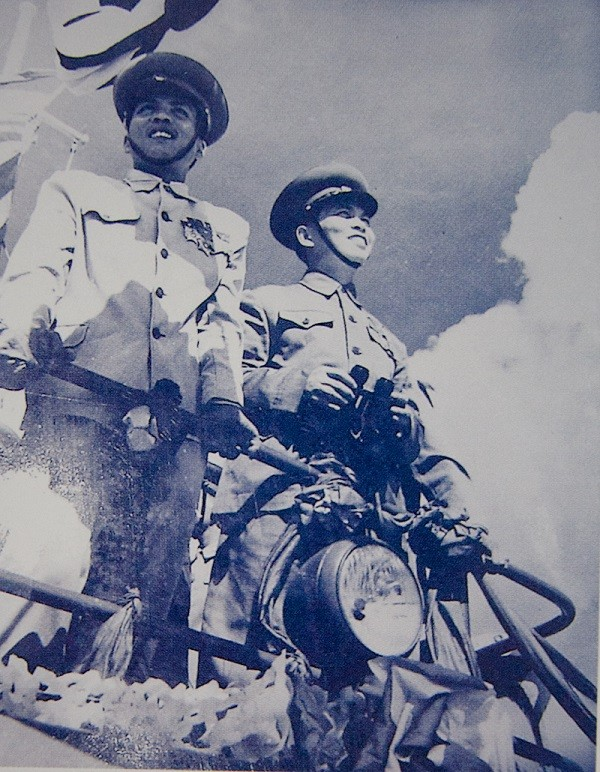
Võ Nguyên Giáp attending the ceremony establishing two naval squadrons – the first naval units of the Vietnamese People's Navy, 1954.

French public opinion continued to move against the war. Between 1946 and 1952 many French troops had been killed, wounded, or captured. Additionally, France was attempting to build up its economy after the devastation of the Second World War. The cost of the war had so far been twice what they had received from the United States under the Marshall Plan.

The war had lasted for seven years and there was still no sign of a clear French victory. A growing number of people in France had reached the conclusion that their country did not have any moral justification for being in Vietnam, and parts of the French left supported the goals of the Việt Minh to form a socialist state.

While growing stronger in Vietnam, the Việt Minh also expanded the war and lured the French to spread their force to remote areas such as Laos. In December 1953, French military commander General Henri Navarre set up a defensive complex at Ðiện Biên Phủ in the Mường Thanh Valley, disrupting Việt Minh supply lines passing through Laos. He surmised that in an attempt to reestablish the route, Giáp would be forced to organize a mass attack on Ðiện Biên Phủ, thus fighting a conventional battle, in which Navarre could expect to have the advantage.

Giáp took up the French challenge. While the French dug in at their outpost, the Việt Minh were also preparing the battlefield. While diversionary attacks were launched in other areas, Giáp ordered his men to covertly position their artillery by hand. Defying standard military practice, he had his twenty-four 105 mm howitzers placed on the forward slopes of the mountains around Dien Bien Phu, in deep, mostly hand-dug emplacements protecting them from French aircraft and counter-battery fire.

With anti-aircraft guns supplied by the Soviet Union, Giáp was able to severely restrict the ability of the French to supply their garrison, forcing them to drop supplies inaccurately from high altitude. Giáp ordered his men to dig a trench system that encircled the French. From the outer trench, other trenches and tunnels were gradually dug inward towards the center. The Viet Minh were now able to move in close to the French troops defending Dien Bien Phu.

When Navarre realized that he was trapped, he appealed for help. The United States was approached and some advisers suggested the use of tactical nuclear weapons against the Viet Minh, but this was never seriously considered. Another suggestion was that conventional air raids would be enough to scatter Giáp's troops. U.S. President Dwight D. Eisenhower, however, refused to intervene unless the British and other Western allies agreed. British Prime Minister Winston Churchill declined, claiming that he wanted to wait for the outcome of the peace negotiations taking place in Geneva, before becoming involved in escalating the war.

On 13 March 1954, Giáp launched his offensive. For 54 days, the Viet Minh seized position after position, pushing the French until they occupied only a small area of Dien Bien Phu. Colonel Piroth, the artillery commander, blamed himself for the destruction of French artillery superiority. He told his fellow officers that he had been "completely dishonoured" and committed suicide with a hand grenade. General De Castries, French Commander in Dien Bien Phu, was captured alive in his bunker. The French surrendered on 7 May. Their casualties totaled over 2,200 killed, 5,600 wounded, and 11,721 taken prisoner. The following day the French government announced that it intended to withdraw from Vietnam.

Giáp's victory over the French was an important inspiration to anti-colonial campaigners around the world, particularly in French colonies, and most particularly in North Africa, not least because many of the troops fighting on the French side in Indochina were from North Africa.

==== Interwar years ====
After the Geneva Peace Accords, Giáp moved back into Hanoi as the North Vietnamese government re-established itself. He expanded and modernised the army, re-equipping it with Soviet and Chinese weapons systems. On 7 May 1955, he inaugurated the Vietnam People's Navy and on 1 May 1959, the Vietnam People's Air Force. During the late 1950s Giáp served as Minister of Defence, Commander in Chief of the People's Army of Vietnam (PAVN), Deputy Prime Minister, and deputy chairman of the Defence Council. In terms of his personal life, he was also able to move back in with his wife, from whom he had been separated for eight years during the war. She was working as a professor of history and social science at that time. Together they raised two boys and two girls. In the little spare time he had, he said in interviews that he occasionally enjoyed playing the piano, as well as reading Goethe, Shakespeare and Tolstoy.

During the late 1950s the top priority of the re-established Vietnamese government was the rapid establishment of a socialist economic order and Communist Party rule. This involved collectivisation of agriculture and central management of all economic production. The process did not go smoothly and it led to food shortages and revolts. At the 10th Plenum of the Communist Party, 27–29 October 1956, Giáp stood in front of the assembled delegates and said:

Cadres, in carrying out their antifeudal task, created contradictions in the tasks of land reform and the Revolution, in some areas treating them as if they were separate activities. We indiscriminately attacked all families owning land. Many thousands were executed. We saw enemies everywhere and resorted to widespread violence and terror. In some places, in our efforts to implement land reform, we failed to respect religious freedoms and the right to worship. We placed too much emphasis on class origins rather than political attitudes. There were grave errors.

The departure of the French and the partition of Vietnam meant that the Hanoi government only controlled the north part of the country. In South Vietnam there were still several thousand guerillas, known as Viet Cong (VC), fighting against the government in Saigon. The Party Plenum in 1957 ordered changes to the structure of their units and Giáp was put in charge of implementing them and building their strength to form a solid basis for an insurrection in the South. The 1959 Plenum decided that the time for escalating the armed struggle in the South was right and in July that year Giáp ordered the opening up of the Ho Chi Minh trail to improve supply lines to VC units.

==== Vietnam War ====
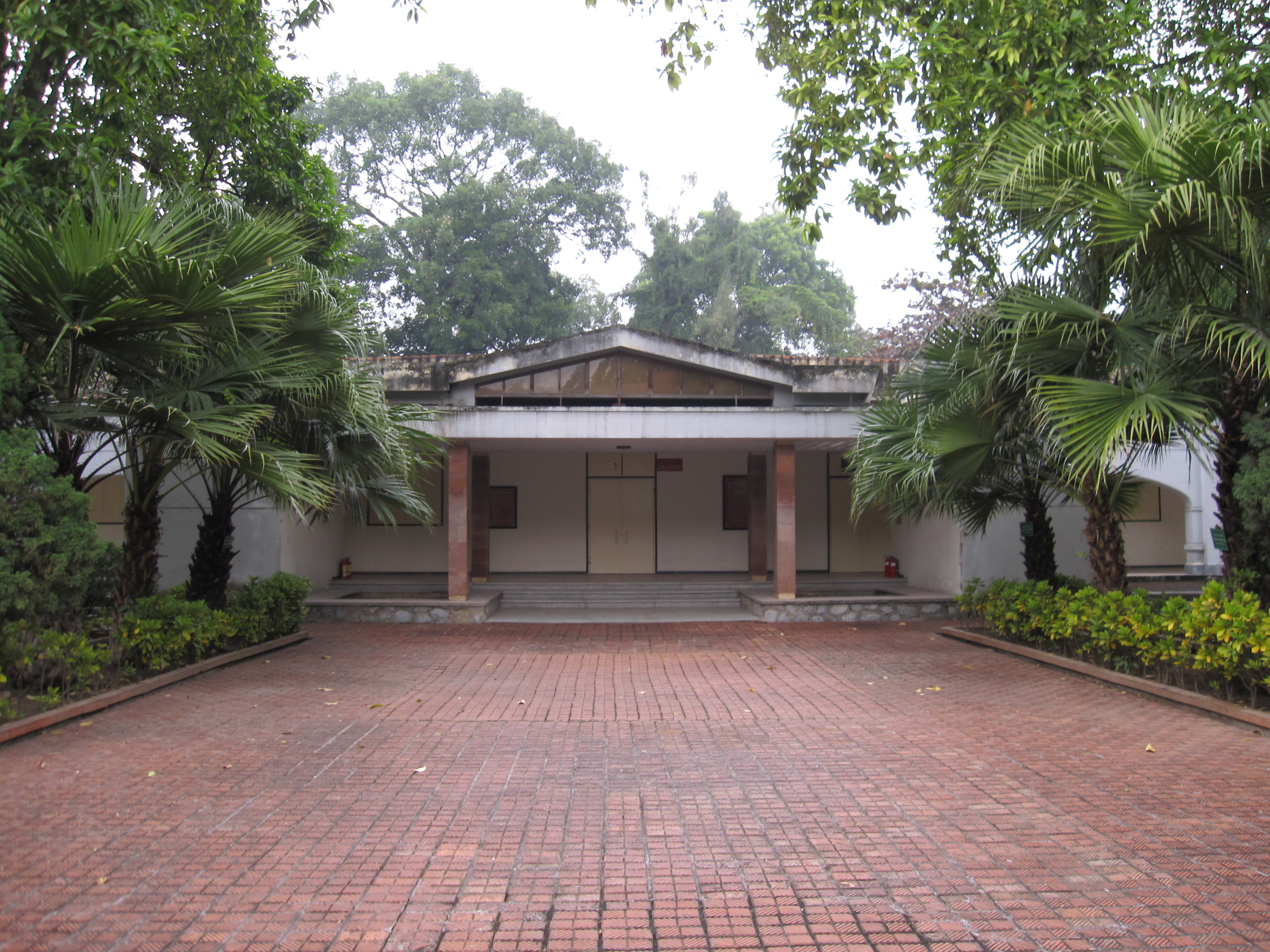
D67 in Hanoi Citadel was the military headquarters of General Giáp during the war

Giáp remained commander in chief of the PAVN throughout the war against South Vietnam and its allies, the United States, South Korea, Australia, Thailand, New Zealand and the Philippines. He oversaw the expansion of the PAVN from a small self-defense force into a large conventional army, equipped by its communist allies with considerable amounts of relatively sophisticated weaponry, although that did not usually match the weaponry of the Americans.

Giáp opposed the implementation of the Tết Offensive of 1968, considering focus on guerrilla tactics in the south to be more effective. The best evidence suggests that when it became obvious that Lê Duẩn and Văn Tiến Dũng were going to conduct it anyway, he left North Vietnam for medical treatment in Hungary and did not return until after the offensive had begun. Although their attempt to spark a general uprising against the southern government failed disastrously, it was a significant political victory through convincing American politicians and the public that their commitment to South Vietnam could not be open-ended. Giáp later argued that the Tết Offensive was not a "purely military strategy" but part of a "general strategy, an integrated one, at once military, political and diplomatic."

Peace negotiations between representatives from the United States, South Vietnam, North Vietnam and the VC began in Paris in January 1969. US President Richard Nixon, like his predecessor Lyndon B. Johnson, was convinced that a U.S. withdrawal was necessary, but four years passed before the last American troops departed.

In October 1972, the negotiators came close to agreeing to a formula to end the conflict. The proposal was that the remaining U.S. troops would withdraw from South Vietnam in exchange for a cease-fire and the return of American prisoners held by North Vietnam. It was also agreed that the governments in North and South Vietnam would remain in power, and reunification would be "carried out step by step through peaceful means". Although the North's Easter Offensive of 1972 had been beaten back with high casualties, the proposal did not require them to leave the South. PAVN would thus be able to maintain control of considerable territory in South Vietnam from which to launch future offensives.

In an effort to put pressure on both North and South Vietnam during the negotiations, Nixon ordered a series of air raids on Hanoi and Haiphong, codenamed Operation Linebacker II. The operation ended on 29 December 1972, after 12 days with 42 U.S. casualties and over 1,600 North Vietnamese killed. North Vietnam then agreed to sign the Paris Peace Accords that had been proposed in October, although with added conditions favorable to both the U.S. and to North Vietnam. South Vietnam objected, but had little choice but to accept it.

The last U.S. military personnel (except for the staff of the Defense Attache's Office and the US Embassy's Marine Security Guards) completed their withdrawal in March 1973. Despite the agreement, there was no end in fighting. South Vietnamese attempts to regain communist-controlled territory inspired their opponents to change strategy. Communist leaders met in Hanoi in March for a series of meetings to plan for a massive offensive against the South. In June 1973, the U.S. Congress passed the Case–Church Amendment, which prohibited any further U.S. military involvement, and the PAVN supply routes could operate normally without any fear of U.S. bombing.

==== Fall of Saigon ====
The Western view of this period is that after Ho Chi Minh's death in September 1969, Giáp lost a power struggle in 1972 shortly after the failed Easter Offensive where he was blamed by the Politburo for the offensive's failure. Giáp was recalled to Hanoi where he was replaced as field commander of the PAVN and from then on watched subsequent events from the sidelines, with the glory of victory in 1975 going to the chief of the general staff, General Văn Tiến Dũng. Giáp's contribution to the 1975 victory is largely ignored by official Vietnamese accounts.

=== Later life ===
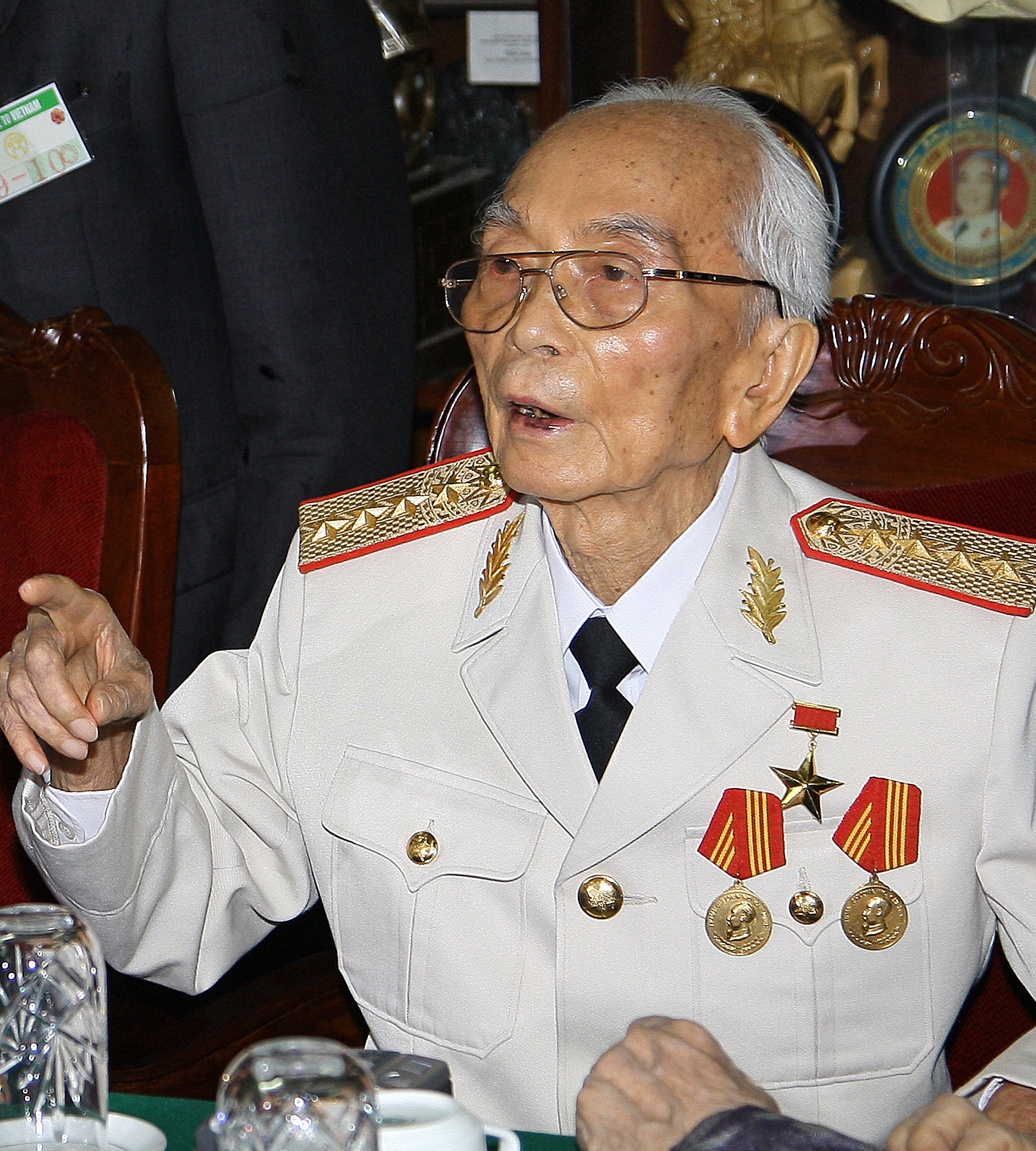
Giáp at a meeting in 2008

Soon after the fall of Saigon, the Socialist Republic of Vietnam was established. In the new government, Giáp was made Deputy Prime Minister in July 1976. In December 1978 he oversaw the successful Cambodian–Vietnamese War which drove the Khmer Rouge from power and ended the Cambodian genocide. In retaliation, Cambodia's ally China responded by invading the Cao Bang province of Vietnam in January 1979 and once again Giáp was in overall responsibility for the response, which drove the Chinese out after a month. He finally retired from his post at the Defense Ministry in 1981 and retired from the Politburo in 1982. He remained on the Central Committee and Deputy Prime Minister until he retired in 1991.

Giáp wrote extensively on military theory and strategy. His works include Big Victory, Great Task; People's Army, People's War; Ðiện Biên Phủ; and We Will Win.

In 1995, former U.S. Secretary of Defense Robert McNamara met Giáp to ask what happened on 4 August 1964 in the second Gulf of Tonkin Incident. "Absolutely nothing", Giáp replied. Giáp said that the attack on 4 August 1964, had been imaginary.

The final and conclusive evidence that there had not been any Vietnamese attack against U.S. ships on the night of 4 August 1964 was provided by the 2005 release, though slightly sanitized, of a classified analysis by National Security Agency historian, Robert J. Hanyok

In a 1998 interview, William Westmoreland criticized the battlefield prowess of Giáp, stating, "By his own admission, by early 1969, I think, he had lost, what, a half million soldiers? He reported this. Now such a disregard for human life may make a formidable adversary, but it does not make a military genius. An American commander losing men like that would hardly have lasted more than a few weeks."

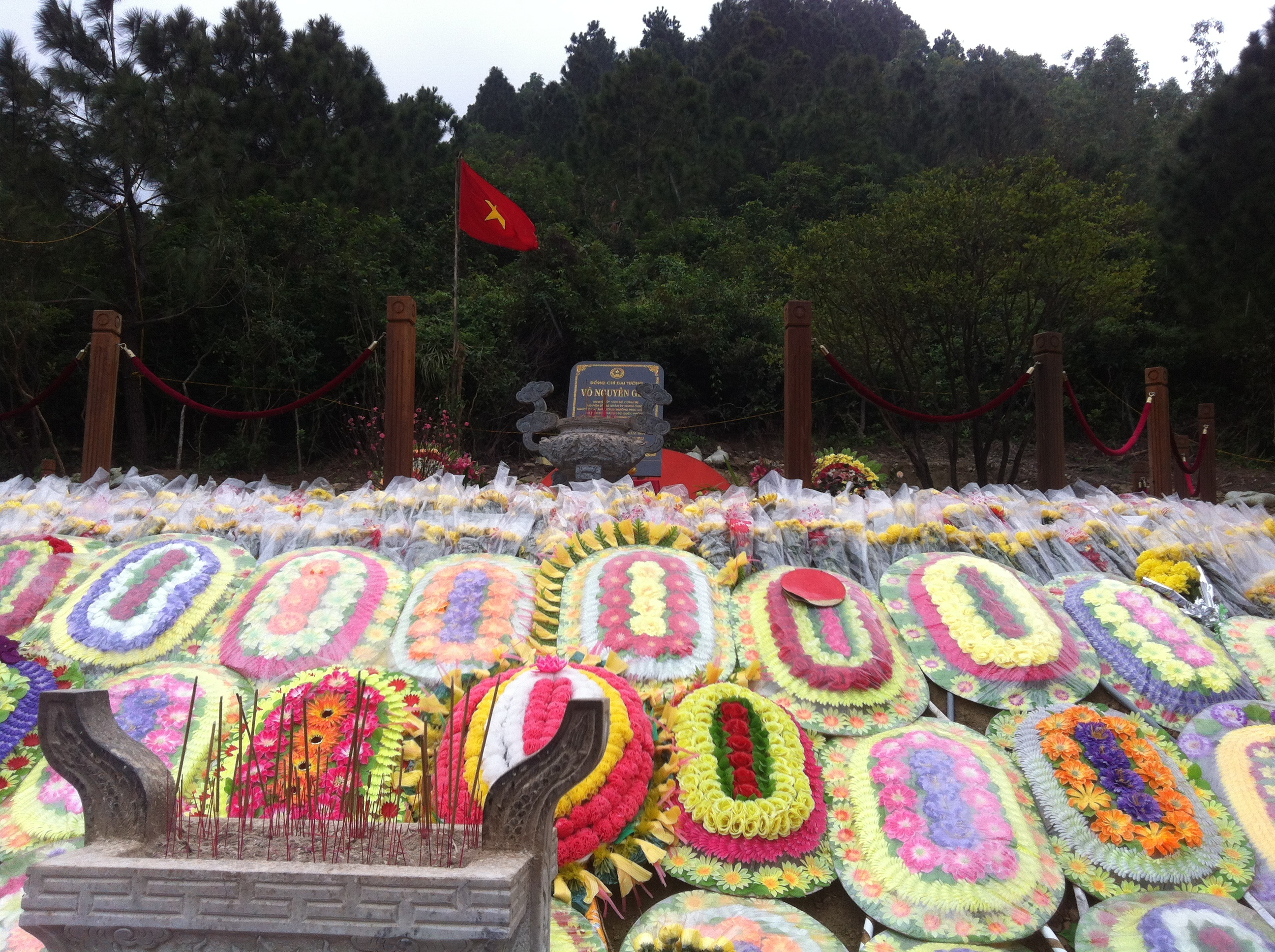
Tomb of Võ Nguyên Giáp in Quảng Bình Province

American historian Derek Frisby criticized Westmoreland's view, which he said reflected a failure in understanding Giáp's core philosophy of "revolutionary war". According to Frisby, "Giáp understood that protracted warfare would cost many lives but that did not always translate into winning or losing the war. In the final analysis, Giáp won the war despite losing many battles, and as long as the army survived to fight another day, the idea of Vietnam lived in the hearts of the people who would support it, and that is the essence of 'revolutionary war'." Nixon's Secretary of State Henry Kissinger said: "We fought a military war; our opponents fought a political one. We sought physical attrition; our opponents aimed for our psychological exhaustion. In the process we lost sight of one of the cardinal maxims of guerrilla war: the guerrilla wins if he does not lose. The conventional army loses if it does not win. The North Vietnamese used their armed forces the way a bull-fighter uses his cape — to keep us lunging in areas of marginal political importance."

Compared to other North Vietnamese leaders who favored an all-out quick offensive in the South to bring victory in a short period like Lê Duẩn, Giáp was relatively cautious, and he believed in a more protracted military struggle, which would not be as costly in manpower. However, he was willing to spend the lives of his soldiers with what American commanders would regard as reckless abandon, if that was what it took to win the war. Giáp explained to American journalist Stanley Karnow in 1990:

''We were not strong enough to drive out a half-million American troops, that wasn't our aim. Our intention was to break the will of the American government to continue the war. Westmoreland was wrong to expect that his superior firepower would grind us down. If we had focused on the balance of forces, we would have been defeated in two hours. We were waging a people's war . . . America's sophisticated arms, electronic devices and all the rest were to no avail in the end. In war there are two factors—human beings and weapons. Ultimately, though, human beings are the decisive factor.''

After the conclusion of the Vietnam War, Giáp extensively wrote about his military strategy. The subsequent passage from one of his books explains his method of defeating a powerful foreign enemy:

"The war of liberation is a protracted war and a hard war in which we must rely mainly on ourselves—for we are strong politically but weak materially, while the enemy is very weak politically but stronger materially."

"Guerrilla warfare is a means of fighting a revolutionary war that relies on the heroic spirit to triumph over modern weapons. It is the means whereby the people of a weak, badly equipped country can stand up against an aggressive army possessing better equipment and techniques."

"The correct tactics for a protracted revolutionary war are to wage guerrilla warfare, to advance from guerrilla warfare to regular warfare and then closely combine these two forms of war; to develop from guerrilla to mobile and then to siege warfare."

"Accumulate a thousand small victories to turn into one great success."

In 2009, Giáp became a prominent critic of bauxite mining in Vietnam following government plans to open large areas of the Central Highlands to the practice. Giáp supported a 1980s study in which experts advised against mining that damaged the environment and national security.

=== Death and legacy ===
On 4 October 2013, the Communist Party of Vietnam and government officials announced that Võ Nguyên Giáp had died, aged 102, at 18:09, at Central Military Hospital 108 in Hanoi. He was given a state funeral on 12–13 October, and his body was laid in state at the national morgue in Hanoi until his burial in his home province of Quảng Bình. After his death, several cities in Vietnam renamed some of their most prominent streets after him.

== Awards and decorations ==
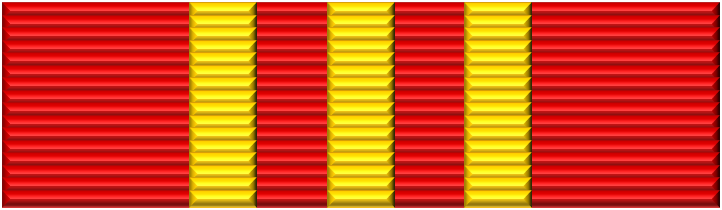

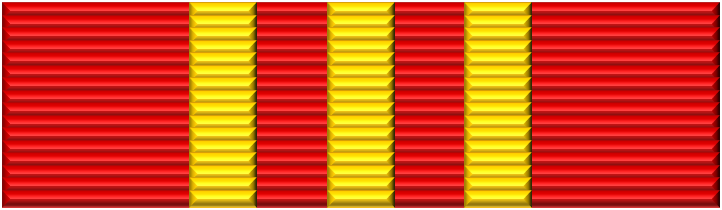

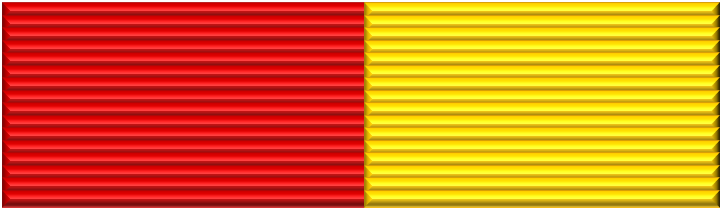

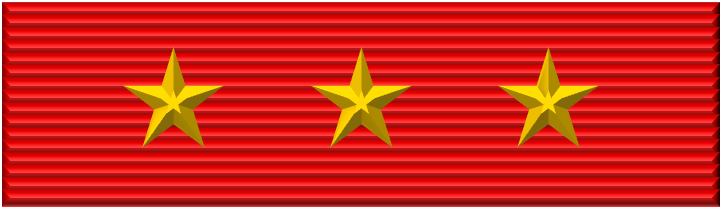

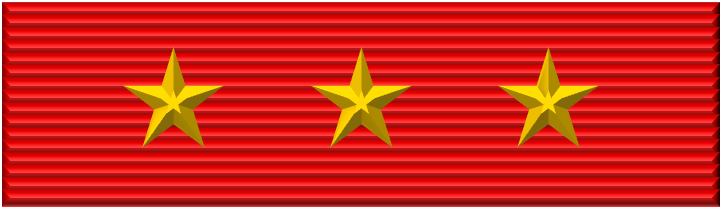

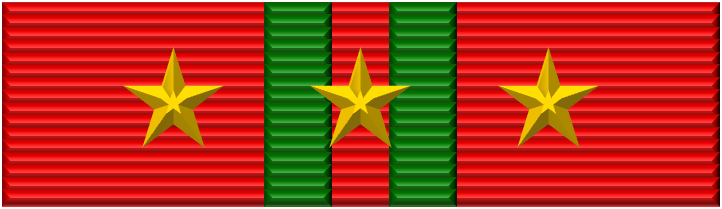

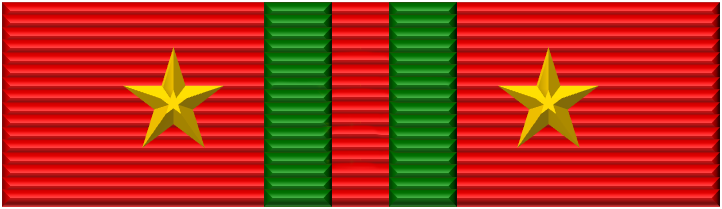

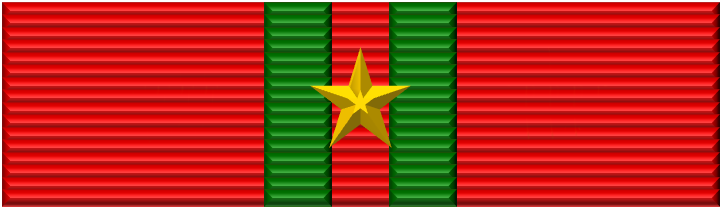

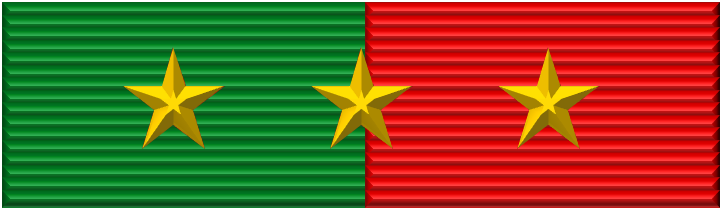

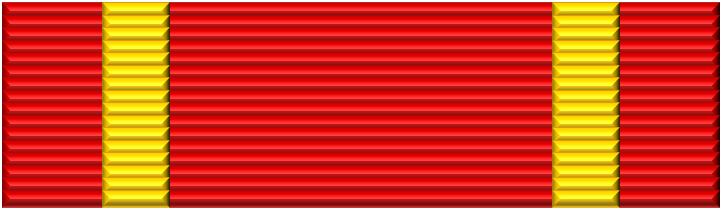

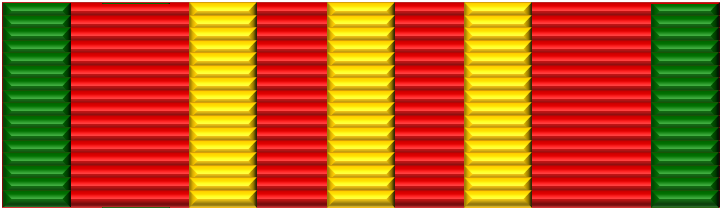

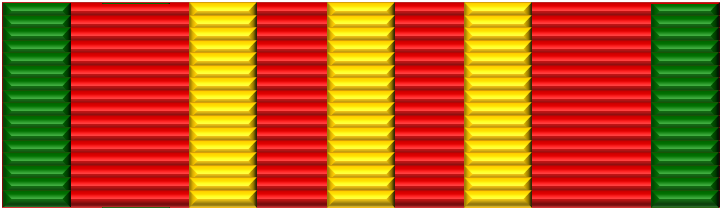

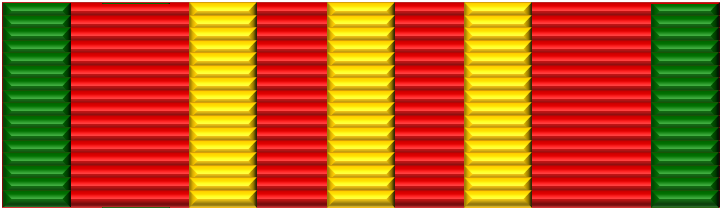

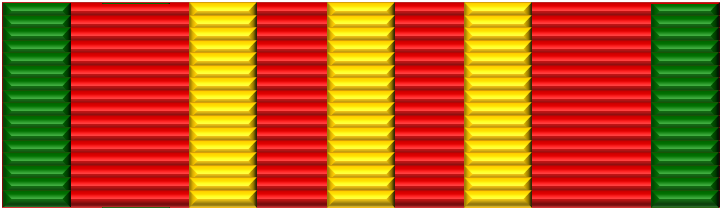

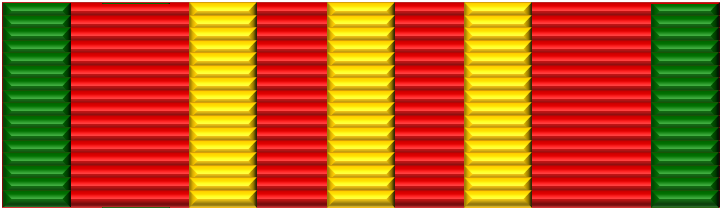

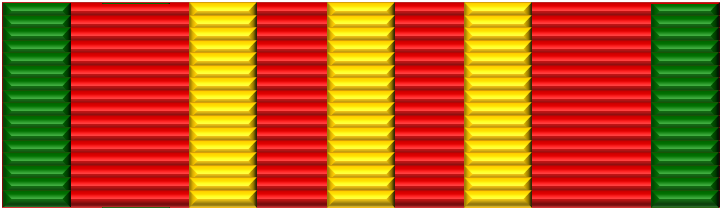

Hero of the People's Armed Forces
| Order of Ho Chi Minh; 1st award | Order of Ho Chi Minh; 2nd award | Gold Star Order | Military Exploit Order; First class 1st award |
| Military Exploit Order; First class 2nd award | Feat Order; First class | Feat Order; Second class | Feat Order; Third class |
| Fatherland Defense Order; First class | Victory Banner Medal | Resolution for Victory Order; 1st award | Resolution for Victory Order; 2nd award |
| Resolution for Victory Order; 3rd award | Resolution for Victory Order; 4th award | Resolution for Victory Order; 5th award | Resolution for Victory Order; 6th award |

== See also ==
- Vietnam
- Vietnam War
- History of Vietnam
- Sino-Vietnamese War

== Bibliography ==
- Currey, Cecil B. (2000). Victory at Any Cost: The Genius of Viet Nam's Gen. Vo Nguyen Giap. Washington: Brassey's Inc. ISBN 1-57488-194-9.
- Currey, Cecil B. (2005). Victory at Any Cost: The Genius of Viet Nam's Gen. Vo Nguyen Giap. Potomac Books, Inc. ISBN 9781612340104.
- Davidson, Phillip B. (1991). Vietnam at War: The History, 1946–1975. Oxford University Press. ISBN 0195067924.
- Dupuy, Trevor N.; Curt Johnson; David L. Bongard (1995). The Harper Encyclopedia of Military Biography. New York: Castle Books. ISBN 0-7858-0437-4.
- Giáp, Võ Nguyên (1970). Military Art of People's War: Selected Writings. New York: Monthly Review Press. ISBN 978-0-85345-193-8.
- Karnow, Stanley (1997). Vietnam: A History. New York: Penguin. ISBN 0-14-026547-3.
- Lawrence, Mark Atwood; Logevall, Fredrik (2007). The First Vietnam War: Colonial Conflict and Cold War Crisis. Harvard University Press. ISBN 9780674023710.
- Macdonald, Peter (1993). Giap: The Victor in Vietnam. Fourth Estate. ISBN 1-85702-107-X.
- Morris, Virginia and Hills, Clive (2006). The Road to Freedom: A History of the Ho Chi Minh Trail, Orchid Press. ISBN 9745240761
- Morris, Virginia and Hills, Clive (2018). Ho Chi Minh's Blueprint for Revolution: In the Words of Vietnamese Strategists and Operatives, McFarland & Co Inc. ISBN 9781476665634
- Morris, Virginia, Huy, Le Do and Hills, Clive (2024). War Site Discoveries of Vietnam, Through rich personal experiences with those who fought, Thế Giới Publishers. ISBN 9786043923735
- Nguyen, Lien-Hang T. Hanoi's War: An International History of the War for Peace in Vietnam. University of North Carolina Press 2012 ISBN 978-0-8078-3551-7
- Pribbenow, Merle (2002). Victory in Vietnam: A History of the People's Army of Vietnam, 1954–1975. Lawrence, Kansas: University Press of Kansas. ISBN 978-0-7006-1175-1.
- Secrets of War: Vietnam Special Operations. Documedia Group. 1998.
- Willbanks, James H. (2013). Vietnam War: The Essential Reference Guide. ABC-CLIO. ISBN 9781610691031.
- Woods, L. Shelton (2002). Vietnam: A Global Studies Handbook. ABC-CLIO. ISBN 9781576074169.
