= Phạm Thị Thanh Trà =

Vietnamese politician (born 1964)

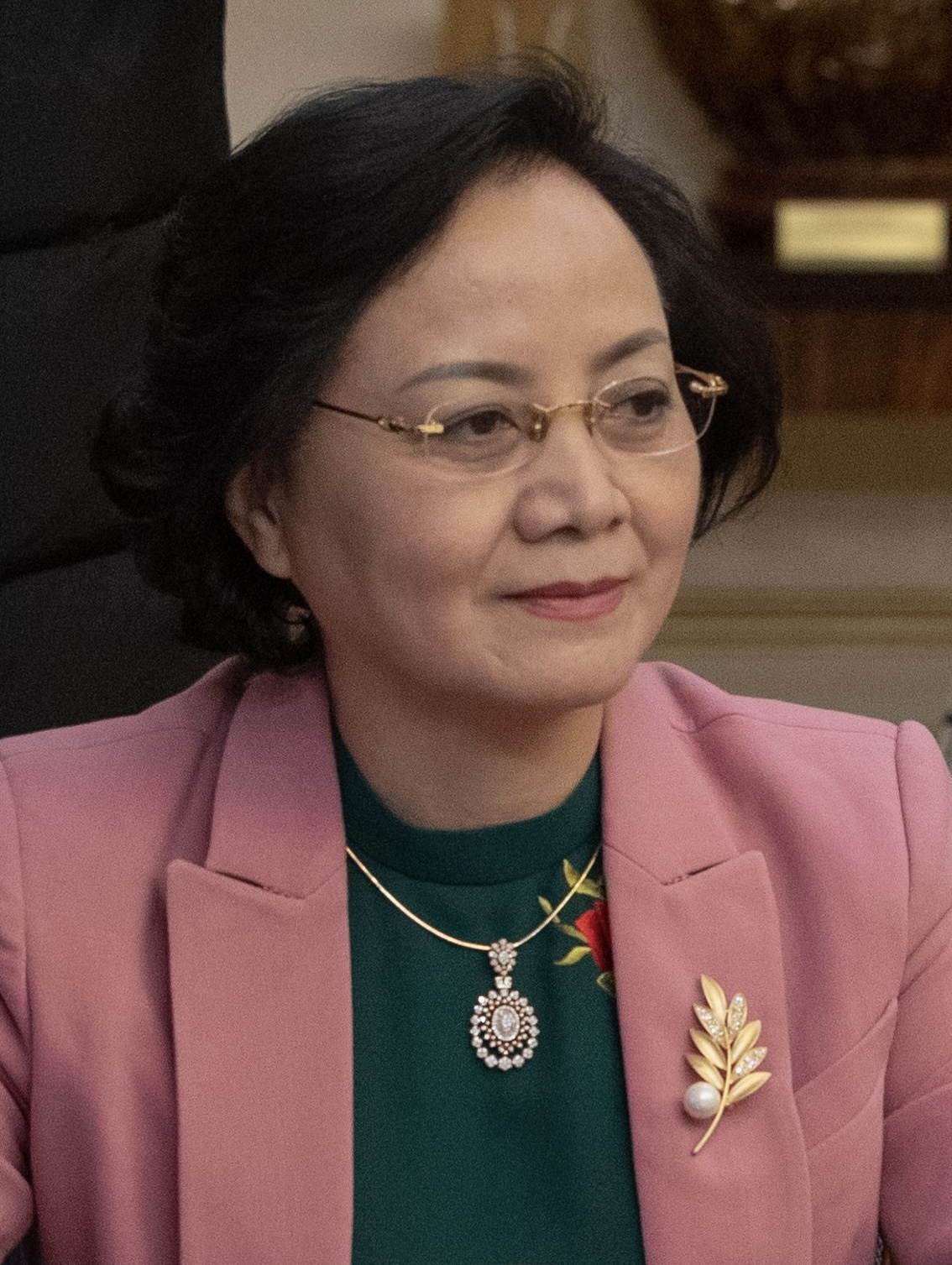
- Trà in 2019

Deputy Prime Minister of Vietnam
- Incumbent
- Assumed office 25 October 2025
- Prime Minister: Phạm Minh Chính; Lê Minh Hưng

Minister of Home Affairs of Vietnam
- In office 8 April 2021 – 24 October 2025
- Prime Minister: Phạm Minh Chính
- Preceded by: Lê Vĩnh Tân
- Succeeded by: Đỗ Thanh Bình

Personal details
- Born: 21 January 1964 (age 62) Nam Đàn district, North Vietnam
- Party: Communist Party of Vietnam

Phạm Thị Thanh Trà (born 21 January 1964) is a Vietnamese politician who is the first female Deputy Prime Minister of Vietnam since 2025. She previously served as Minister of Home Affairs between 2021 and 2025.

== Career ==
Trà was born on 21 January 1964 in Nam Đàn district, North Vietnam.

Trà joined the Communist Party of Vietnam on 12 June 1993. Her career began in Yên Bái and worked in the education sector as deputy director of the Disctrict Education Office. Trà also served as vice-chair of the District People's Committee, deputy secretary and secretary of the Yen Bai Provincial Youth League Committee, vice-chair of the Provincial People's Committee, member of the Standing Committee of the Yen Bai Provincial Committee of the Communist Party of Vietnam, and secretary of the Municipal Committee. In 2014, she was promoted to undersecretary of the Yen Bai Provincial Committee of the Communist Party of Vietnam. In 2015, Trà also served as chairwoman of the Yen Bai Provincial People's Committee.

Trà was elected in January 2026 member of the 12th Central Committee of the Communist Party of Vietnam.

In August 2016, after Pham Duy Cuong, secretary of the Yen Bai Provincial Committee of the Communist Party of Vietnam was assassinated, Trà succeeded him until 2020.

Prime Minister Nguyễn Xuân Phúc appointed Trà deputy Minister of Home Affairs of Vietnam in September 2020. In 2021 Trà was re-elected member of the 13th Central Committee of the Communist Party of Vietnam.

On 8 April 2021, the National Assembly appointed Trà the new Minister of Home Affairs. Trà became the first female Deputy Prime Minister of Vietnam on 25 October 2025.
