= Nguyễn Phú Nguyên =

Vietnamese footballer (born 1995)

Personal information
- Full name: Nguyễn Phú Nguyên
- Date of birth: 29 October 1995 (age 31)
- Place of birth: Nam Đàn, Nghệ An, Vietnam
- Height: 1.70 m (5 ft 7 in)
- Position: Winger

Team information
- Current team: Quảng Nam
- Number: 22

Youth career
- 2006–2016: Sông Lam Nghệ An

Senior career*
Years	Team	Apps	(Gls)
2016–2020	Sông Lam Nghệ An	11	(1)
2019	→ Hải Phòng	4	(0)
2021–2023	Hải Phòng	22	(2)
2023–2024	Bình Phước	6	(1)
2024–	Quảng Nam	7	(0)
- * Club domestic league appearances and goals as of 12 April 2025

Nguyễn Phú Nguyên (born 29 October 1995) is a Vietnamese professional footballer who plays as a winger for V.League 1 side Quảng Nam.

== Career ==
Born in Nghệ An, Phú Nguyên was formed at the Sông Lam Nghệ An, where he spent 10 years. He made his senior debut in the 2016 V.League 1.

In 2019, Phú Nguyên was loaned to Hải Phòng for one season but the move was deemed disappointing as he didn't have much game team. He returned to Sông Lam Nghệ An and remained there one year before his contract expired. He then returned to Hải Phòng, signing a three-year contract. In the 2021 V.League 1 season, Phú Nguyên's performance led his team to clinch the top position in the first rounds of the league. However, the league was later cancelled due to the COVID-19 pandemic in Vietnam. In the following seasons, he suffered from several long-term injuries, which result in his limited game time.

In summer 2023, Phú Nguyên signed for V.League 2 side Bình Phước. He left the team after one season and joined V.League 1 side Quảng Nam in September 2024, signing a two-year contract.

== Honours ==
Sông Lam Nghệ An

- Vietnamese Cup: 2017
