= Deputy Prime Minister of Vietnam =

Political Office in Vietnam

Deputy Prime Minister of the Government of the Socialist Republic of Vietnam Phó Thủ tướng Chính phủ nước Cộng hòa Xã hội chủ nghĩa Việt Nam
- Seal of the Government

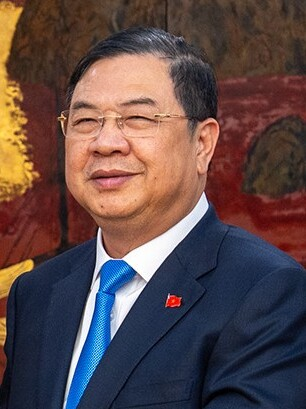
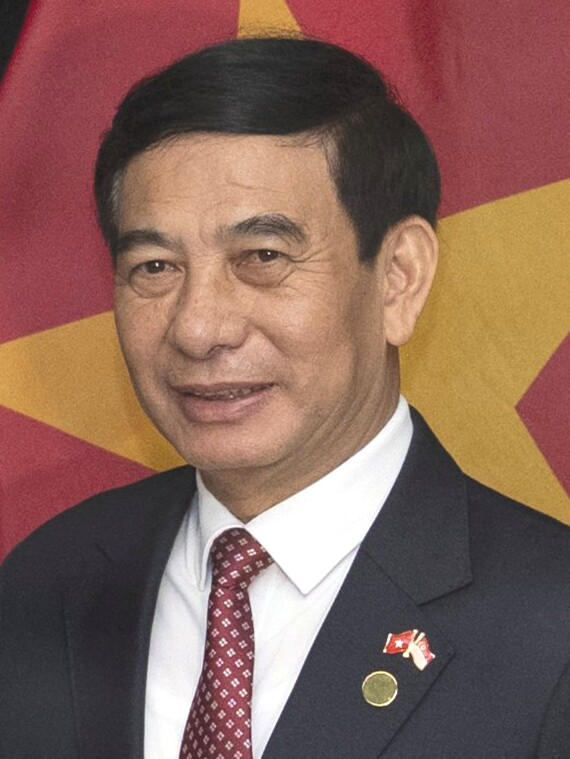
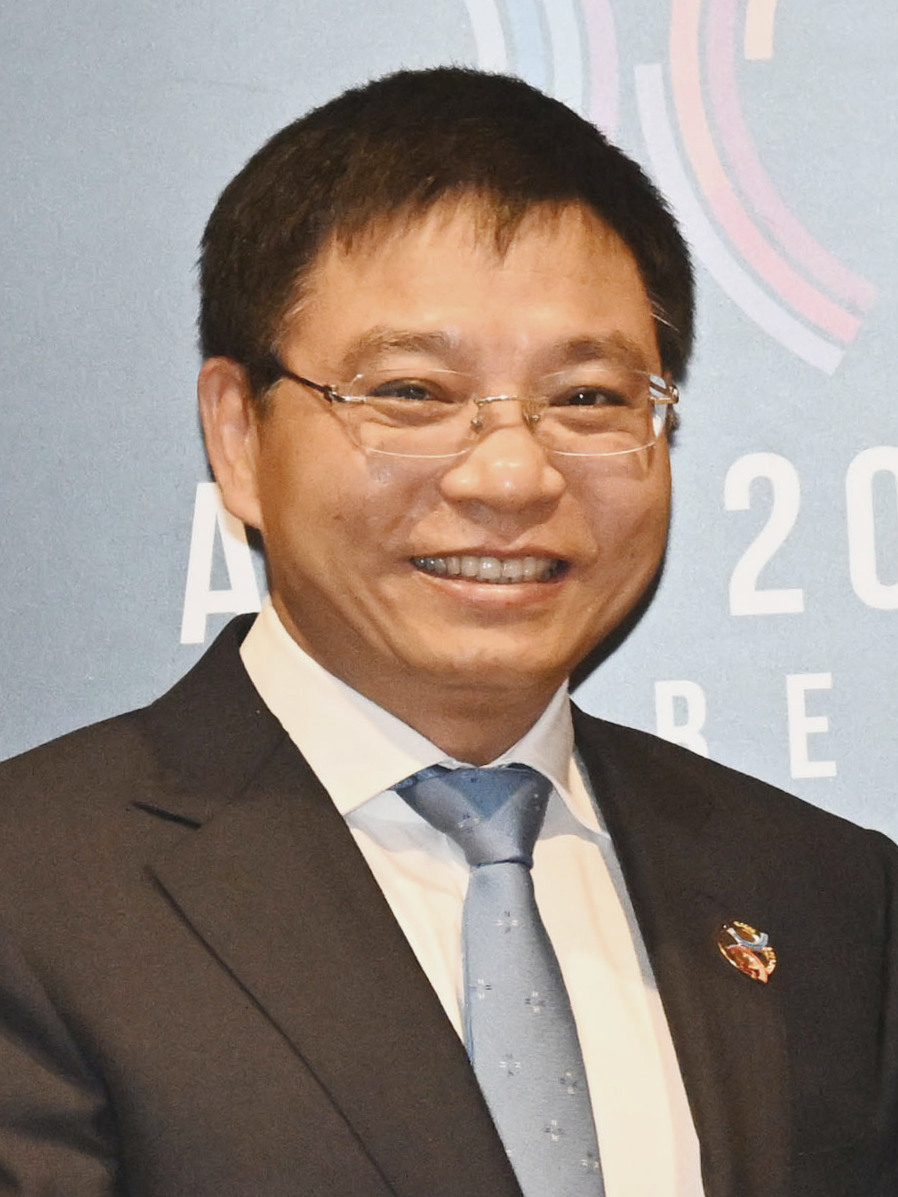
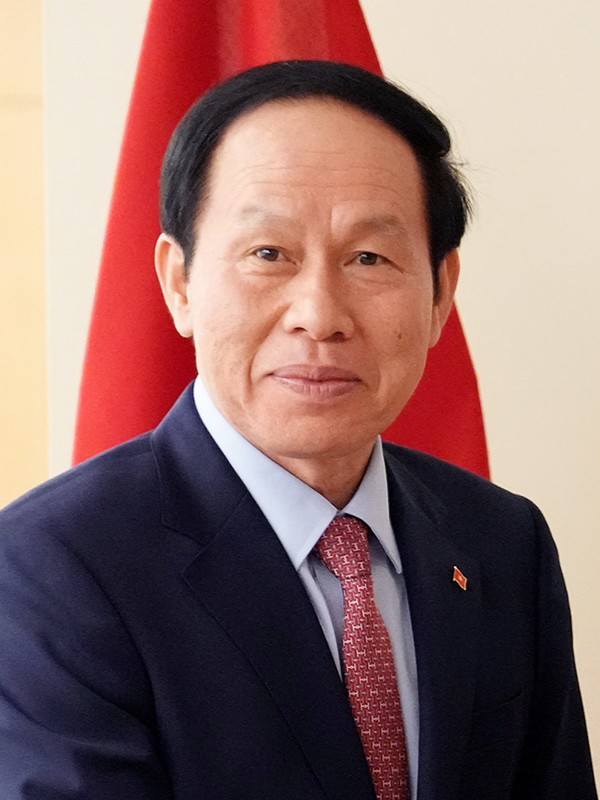
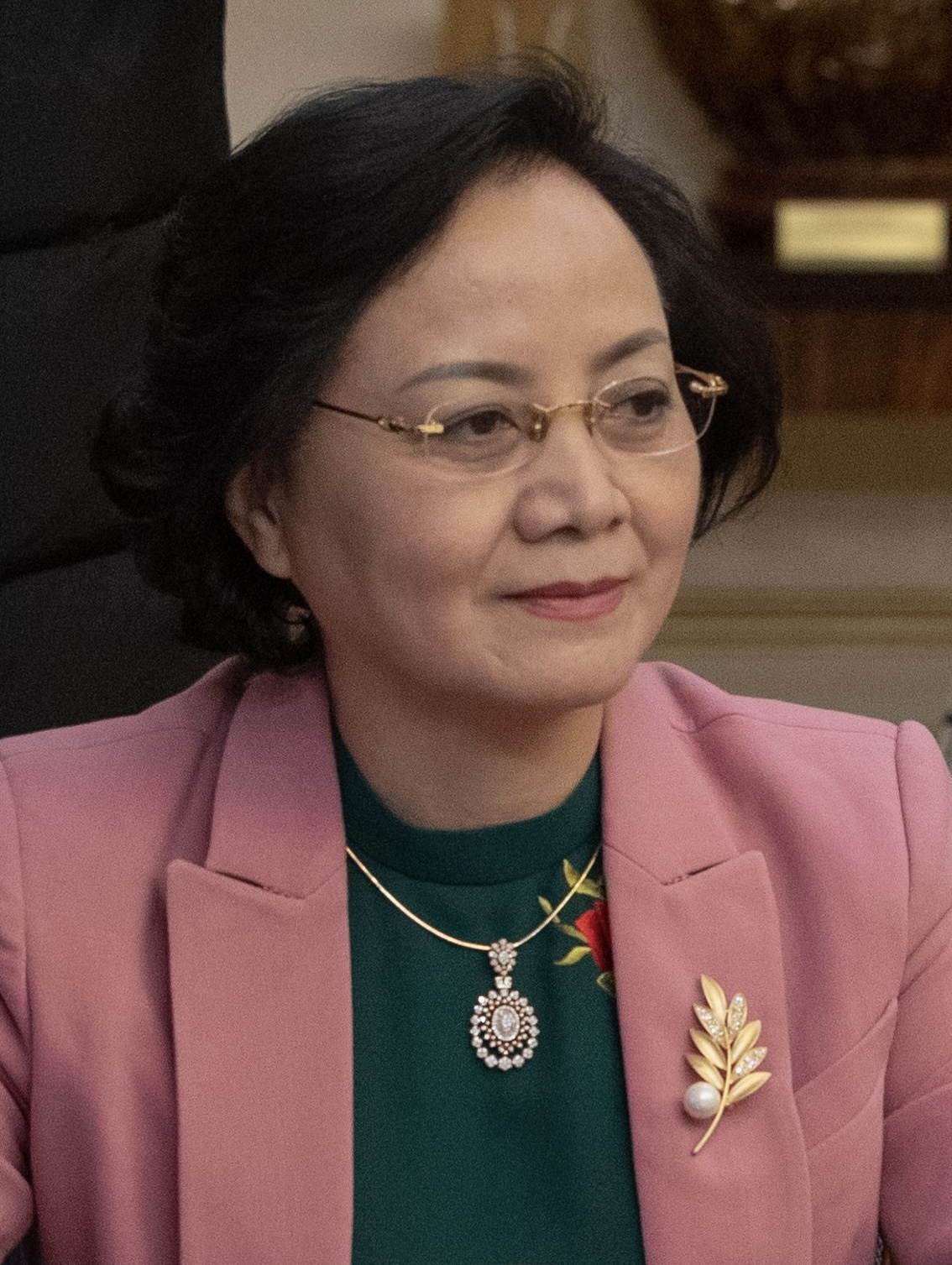
- Incumbent; Phạm Gia Túc (Permanent); Phan Văn Giang; Nguyễn Văn Thắng; Lê Tiến Châu since 8 April 2026; Phạm Thị Thanh Trà; Hồ Quốc Dũng since 25 October 2025
- Style: His Excellency
- Member of: Government of Vietnam
- Reports to: Prime Minister; National Assembly
- Seat: Hanoi, Vietnam
- Appointer: Prime Minister
- Term length: No fixed restrictions
- Inaugural holder: Nguyễn Hải Thần
- Formation: 27 September 1945

The deputy prime minister of the Government of the Socialist Republic of Vietnam (Vietnamese: Phó Thủ tướng Chính phủ nước Cộng hòa xã hội chủ nghĩa Việt Nam), known as the deputy chairman of the Council of Ministers (Vietnamese: Phó Chủ tịch Hội đồng Bộ trưởng) from 1981 to 1992, is one of the highest offices within the Central Government. The deputy prime minister has throughout its history been responsible for helping the prime minister to handle Vietnam's internal policies. Since Vietnam is a one-party state, with the Communist Party of Vietnam being the sole party allowed by the constitution, all the deputy prime ministers of the Democratic Republic and the Socialist Republic have been members of the party while holding office.

There are currently six deputy prime ministers: Phạm Gia Túc, Phan Văn Giang, Nguyễn Văn Thắng, Lê Tiến Châu, Phạm Thị Thanh Trà and Hồ Quốc Dũng. Each deputy prime minister is responsible for one particular field of the country.

The Permanent Deputy Prime Minister, also known as the First Deputy Prime Minister (Vietnamese: Phó Thủ tướng Thường trực Chính phủ, lit. 'On-duty Deputy Prime Minister of the Government'), is a senior member of the Central Government and usually a member of the Politburo. The Permanent Deputy Prime Minister ranks second in the cabinet after the Prime Minister and above all the other deputy prime ministers and ministers. This position is currently held by Phạm Gia Túc since April 2026.

All deputy prime ministers are appointed by the Prime Minister with consent from the National Assembly.

== Deputy prime ministers of the Democratic Republic of Vietnam (1945–1976) ==
| No. (Note: These numbers are official. The "—" denotes acting deputy prime minister. The first column shows how many deputy prime ministers there have been in Vietnamese history, while the second show how many deputy prime ministers there was in that state.) | | Rank (Note: The Central Committee when it convenes for its first session after being elected by a National Party Congress elects the Politburo. According to David Koh, in interviews with several high-standing Vietnamese officials, the Politburo ranking is based upon the number of approval votes by the Central Committee. Lê Hồng Anh, the Minister of Public Security, was ranked 2nd in the 10th Politburo because he received the second-highest number of approval votes. Another example being Tô Huy Rứa of the 10th Politburo, he was ranked lowest because he received the lowest approval vote of the 10th Central Committee when he stood for election for a seat in the Politburo. This system was implemented at the 1st plenum of the 10th Central Committee. The Politburo ranking functioned as an official order of precedence before the 10th Party Congress, and some believe it still does.) | Name (birth–death) | Portrait | Took office | Left office | Head of government |
|---|---|---|---|---|---|---|---|
| 1 | 1 | — | Nguyễn Hải Thần (1878–1958) | | 27 September 1945 | 1 June 1946 | Hồ Chí Minh |
| 2 | 2 | 6 | Phạm Văn Đồng (1906–2000) | | 25 June 1947 | 20 September 1955 | Hồ Chí Minh |
| 3 | 3 | — | Phan Kế Toại (1892–1973) | | 20 September 1955 | 6 June 1973 | Phạm Văn Đồng |
| 4 | 4 | 5 | Võ Nguyên Giáp (1911–2013) | | 20 September 1955 | 2 July 1976 | Phạm Văn Đồng |
| 4 | 4 | 7 | Võ Nguyên Giáp (1911–2013) | | 20 September 1955 | 2 July 1976 | Phạm Văn Đồng |
| 5 | 5 | 2 | Trường Chinh (1907–1988) | | April 1958 | 10 June 1960 | Phạm Văn Đồng |
| 6 | 6 | 11 | Phạm Hùng (1912–1988) | | April 1958 | 10 June 1971 | Phạm Văn Đồng |
| 6 | 6 | 5 | Phạm Hùng (1912–1988) | | April 1958 | 10 June 1971 | Phạm Văn Đồng |
| 7 | 7 | 10 | Nguyễn Duy Trinh (1910–1985) | | 15 June 1960 | 2 July 1976 | Phạm Văn Đồng |
| 7 | 7 | 9 | Nguyễn Duy Trinh (1910–1985) | | 15 June 1960 | 2 July 1976 | Phạm Văn Đồng |
| 8 | 8 | 12 | Lê Thanh Nghị (1911–1989) | | 15 June 1960 | 2 July 1976 | Phạm Văn Đồng |
| 8 | 8 | 10 | Lê Thanh Nghị (1911–1989) | | 15 June 1960 | 2 July 1976 | Phạm Văn Đồng |
| 9 | 9 | — | Nguyễn Côn (1916–2022) | — | November 1967 | 2 July 1976 | Phạm Văn Đồng |
| 10 | 10 | — | Đỗ Mười (1917–2018) | | December 1969 | 2 July 1976 | Phạm Văn Đồng |
| 11 | 11 | — | Hoàng Anh (1912–2016) | — | April 1971 | 2 July 1976 | Phạm Văn Đồng |
| 12 | 12 | — | Trần Hữu Dực (1910–1993) | — | March 1974 | 2 July 1976 | Phạm Văn Đồng |
| 13 | 13 | — | Phan Trọng Tuệ (1917–1991) | — | March 1974 | 2 July 1976 | Phạm Văn Đồng |
| 14 | 14 | — | Đặng Việt Châu (1914–1987) | — | March 1974 | 2 July 1976 | Phạm Văn Đồng |

== Deputy prime ministers of the Republic of South Vietnam (1969–1976) ==
| No. | Name (birth–death) | Portrait | Took office | Left office | Chairman of government |
|---|---|---|---|---|---|
| 1 | Phùng Văn Cung (1909–1987) | — | 6 June 1969 | 2 July 1976 | Huỳnh Tấn Phát |
| 2 | Nguyễn Văn Kiết (1906–1987) | — | 6 June 1969 | 2 July 1976 | Huỳnh Tấn Phát |
| 3 | Nguyễn Đóa (1896–1993) | — | 6 June 1969 | 2 July 1976 | Huỳnh Tấn Phát |
| 4 | Trịnh Đình Thảo (1901–1986) | | 6 June 1969 | 2 July 1976 | Huỳnh Tấn Phát |

== Deputy prime ministers of the Socialist Republic of Vietnam (1976–present) ==
| No. | | Rank | Name (birth–death) | Portrait | Took office | Left office | Prime Minister |
|---|---|---|---|---|---|---|---|
| 1 | 3 | 7 | Võ Nguyên Giáp (1911–2013) | | 2 July 1976 | 8 August 1991 | Phạm Văn Đồng |
| 1 | 3 | 6 | Võ Nguyên Giáp (1911–2013) | | 2 July 1976 | 8 August 1991 | Phạm Văn Đồng |
| 1 | 3 | — | Võ Nguyên Giáp (1911–2013) | | 2 July 1976 | 8 August 1991 | Phạm Văn Đồng |
| 1 | 3 | — | Võ Nguyên Giáp (1911–2013) | | 2 July 1976 | 8 August 1991 | Phạm Hùng |
| 1 | 3 | — | Võ Nguyên Giáp (1911–2013) | | 2 July 1976 | 8 August 1991 | Đỗ Mười |
| 2 | 6 | 5 | Phạm Hùng (1912–1988) | | 2 July 1976 | 22 June 1987 | Phạm Văn Đồng |
| 2 | 6 | 4 | Phạm Hùng (1912–1988) | | 2 July 1976 | 22 June 1987 | Phạm Văn Đồng |
| 2 | 6 | 2 | Phạm Hùng (1912–1988) | | 2 July 1976 | 22 June 1987 | Phạm Văn Đồng |
| 3 | 8 | 10 | Lê Thanh Nghị (1911–1989) | | 2 July 1976 | 4 July 1981 | Phạm Văn Đồng |
| 3 | 8 | 8 | Lê Thanh Nghị (1911–1989) | | 2 July 1976 | 4 July 1981 | Phạm Văn Đồng |
| 4 | 10 | 17 | Đỗ Mười (1917–2018) | | 2 July 1976 | 22 June 1987 | Phạm Văn Đồng |
| 4 | 10 | 11 | Đỗ Mười (1917–2018) | | 2 July 1976 | 22 June 1987 | Phạm Văn Đồng |
| 4 | 10 | 4 | Đỗ Mười (1917–2018) | | 2 July 1976 | 22 June 1987 | Phạm Hùng |
| 5 | 15 | — | Huỳnh Tấn Phát (1913–1989) | — | 2 July 1976 | June 1982 | Phạm Văn Đồng |
| 6 | 16 | 13 | Võ Chí Công (1912–2011) | — | 2 July 1976 | April 1982 | Phạm Văn Đồng |
| 6 | 16 | 7 | Võ Chí Công (1912–2011) | — | 2 July 1976 | April 1982 | Phạm Văn Đồng |
| 7 | 17 | 15 | Tố Hữu (1920–2002) | — | February 1980 | June 1986 | Phạm Văn Đồng |
| 7 | 17 | 9 | Tố Hữu (1920–2002) | — | February 1980 | June 1986 | Phạm Văn Đồng |
| 8 | 18 | — | Nguyễn Lam (1922–1990) | — | February 1980 | April 1982 | Phạm Văn Đồng |
| 9 | 19 | — | Trần Quỳnh (1920–2005) | — | January 1981 | February 1987 | Phạm Văn Đồng |
| 10 | 20 | 10 | Võ Văn Kiệt (1922–2008) | | April 1982 | 8 August 1991 | Phạm Văn Đồng |
| 10 | 20 | 5 | Võ Văn Kiệt (1922–2008) | | April 1982 | 8 August 1991 | Himself (acting) |
| 10 | 20 | 5 | Võ Văn Kiệt (1922–2008) | | April 1982 | 8 August 1991 | Phạm Hùng |
| 10 | 20 | 5 | Võ Văn Kiệt (1922–2008) | | April 1982 | 8 August 1991 | Đỗ Mười |
| 11 | 21 | 16 | Đồng Sỹ Nguyên (1923–2019) | — | April 1982 | 8 August 1991 | Phạm Văn Đồng |
| 11 | 21 | 9 | Đồng Sỹ Nguyên (1923–2019) | — | April 1982 | 8 August 1991 | Phạm Văn Đồng |
| 11 | 21 | 9 | Đồng Sỹ Nguyên (1923–2019) | — | April 1982 | 8 August 1991 | Phạm Hùng |
| 11 | 21 | — | Đồng Sỹ Nguyên (1923–2019) | — | April 1982 | 8 August 1991 | Đỗ Mười |
| 12 | 22 | — | Vũ Đình Liệu (1918–2005) | — | April 1982 | February 1987 | Phạm Văn Đồng |
| 13 | 23 | — | Trần Phương (1927–2025) | — | April 1982 | February 1987 | Phạm Văn Đồng |
| 6 | 16 | 3 | Võ Chí Công (1912–2011) | — | 27 June 1986 | 22 June 1987 | Phạm Văn Đồng |
| 14 | 24 | 8 | Nguyễn Cơ Thạch (1921–1998) | | February 1987 | 8 August 1991 | Phạm Văn Đồng |
| 14 | 24 | 8 | Nguyễn Cơ Thạch (1921–1998) | | February 1987 | 8 August 1991 | Phạm Hùng |
| 14 | 24 | 8 | Nguyễn Cơ Thạch (1921–1998) | | February 1987 | 8 August 1991 | Đỗ Mười |
| 14 | 24 | — | Nguyễn Cơ Thạch (1921–1998) | | February 1987 | 8 August 1991 | Đỗ Mười |
| 15 | 25 | — | Nguyễn Ngọc Trìu (1926–2016) | — | February 1987 | May 1988 | Phạm Văn Đồng |
| 15 | 25 | — | Nguyễn Ngọc Trìu (1926–2016) | — | February 1987 | May 1988 | Phạm Hùng |
| 16 | 26 | — | Trần Đức Lương (1937–2025) | | February 1987 | 29 September 1997 | Phạm Văn Đồng |
| 16 | 26 | — | Trần Đức Lương (1937–2025) | | February 1987 | 29 September 1997 | Phạm Hùng |
| 16 | 26 | — | Trần Đức Lương (1937–2025) | | February 1987 | 29 September 1997 | Đỗ Mười |
| 16 | 26 | — | Trần Đức Lương (1937–2025) | | February 1987 | 29 September 1997 | Võ Văn Kiệt |
| 16 | 26 | 12 | Trần Đức Lương (1937–2025) | | February 1987 | 29 September 1997 | Võ Văn Kiệt |
| 16 | 26 | 12 | Trần Đức Lương (1937–2025) | | February 1987 | 29 September 1997 | Phan Văn Khải |
| 17 | 27 | — | Nguyễn Khánh (1928–2023) | — | February 1987 | 29 September 1997 | Phạm Văn Đồng |
| 17 | 27 | — | Nguyễn Khánh (1928–2023) | — | February 1987 | 29 September 1997 | Phạm Hùng |
| 17 | 27 | — | Nguyễn Khánh (1928–2023) | — | February 1987 | 29 September 1997 | Đỗ Mười |
| 17 | 27 | — | Nguyễn Khánh (1928–2023) | — | February 1987 | 29 September 1997 | Võ Văn Kiệt |
| 17 | 27 | — | Nguyễn Khánh (1928–2023) | — | February 1987 | 29 September 1997 | Phan Văn Khải |
| 18 | 28 | — | Đoàn Duy Thành (1929–2026) | — | February 1987 | May 1988 | Phạm Văn Đồng |
| 18 | 28 | — | Đoàn Duy Thành (1929–2026) | — | February 1987 | May 1988 | Phạm Hùng |
| 19 | 29 | — | Nguyễn Văn Chính (1924–2016) | — | February 1987 | May 1988 | Phạm Văn Đồng |
| 19 | 29 | — | Nguyễn Văn Chính (1924–2016) | — | February 1987 | May 1988 | Phạm Hùng |
| 20 | 30 | — | Phan Văn Khải (permanent) (Note: from 23 August 1992.) (1933–2018) | | 8 August 1991 | 29 September 1997 | Đỗ Mười |
| 20 | 30 | 8 | Phan Văn Khải (permanent) (1933–2018) | | 8 August 1991 | 29 September 1997 | Võ Văn Kiệt |
| 20 | 30 | 7 | Phan Văn Khải (permanent) (1933–2018) | | 8 August 1991 | 29 September 1997 | Võ Văn Kiệt |
| 20 | 30 | 3 | Phan Văn Khải (permanent) (1933–2018) | | 8 August 1991 | 29 September 1997 | Võ Văn Kiệt |
| 21 | 31 | 15 | Nguyễn Tấn Dũng (permanent) (born 1949) | | 29 September 1997 | 27 June 2006 | Phan Văn Khải |
| 21 | 31 | 5 | Nguyễn Tấn Dũng (permanent) (born 1949) | | 29 September 1997 | 27 June 2006 | Phan Văn Khải |
| 21 | 31 | 4 | Nguyễn Tấn Dũng (permanent) (born 1949) | | 29 September 1997 | 27 June 2006 | Phan Văn Khải |
| 22 | 32 | 8 | Nguyễn Mạnh Cầm (born 1929) | | 29 September 1997 | 12 August 2002 | Phan Văn Khải |
| 22 | 32 | — | Nguyễn Mạnh Cầm (born 1929) | | 29 September 1997 | 12 August 2002 | Phan Văn Khải |
| 23 | 33 | — | Nguyễn Công Tạn (1935–2014) | — | 29 September 1997 | 12 August 2002 | Phan Văn Khải |
| 24 | 34 | — | Ngô Xuân Lộc (born 1940) | — | 29 September 1997 | 11 December 1999 | Phan Văn Khải |
| 25 | 35 | — | Phạm Gia Khiêm (born 1944) | | 29 September 1997 | 3 August 2011 | Phan Văn Khải |
| 25 | 35 | 7 | Phạm Gia Khiêm (born 1944) | | 29 September 1997 | 3 August 2011 | Nguyễn Tấn Dũng |
| 26 | 36 | — | Vũ Khoan (1937–2023) | | 12 August 2002 | 27 June 2006 | Phan Văn Khải |
| 27 | 37 | — | Nguyễn Sinh Hùng (permanent) (born 1946) | | 28 June 2006 | 25 July 2011 | Nguyễn Tấn Dũng |
| 28 | 38 | 9 | Trương Vĩnh Trọng (1942–2021) | | 28 June 2006 | 19 January 2012 | Nguyễn Tấn Dũng |
| 29 | 39 | — | Hoàng Trung Hải (born 1959) | | 2 August 2007 | 8 April 2016 | Nguyễn Tấn Dũng |
| 30 | 40 | — | Nguyễn Thiện Nhân (born 1953) | | 2 August 2007 | 11 November 2013 | Nguyễn Tấn Dũng |
| 31 | 41 | 3 | Nguyễn Xuân Phúc (permanent) (born 1954) | | 2 August 2011 | 7 April 2016 | Nguyễn Tấn Dũng |
| 31 | 41 | 6 | Nguyễn Xuân Phúc (permanent) (born 1954) | | 2 August 2011 | 7 April 2016 | Nguyễn Tấn Dũng |
| 32 | 42 | — | Vũ Văn Ninh (born 1955) | | 2 August 2011 | 7 April 2016 | Nguyễn Tấn Dũng |
| 33 | 43 | — | Phạm Bình Minh (permanent) (Note: from 6 September 2021) (born 1959) | | 13 November 2013 | 5 January 2023 | Nguyễn Tấn Dũng |
| 33 | 43 | 13 | Phạm Bình Minh (permanent) (born 1959) | | 13 November 2013 | 5 January 2023 | Nguyễn Xuân Phúc |
| 33 | 43 | 13 | Phạm Bình Minh (permanent) (born 1959) | | 13 November 2013 | 5 January 2023 | Phạm Minh Chính |
| 34 | 44 | — | Vũ Đức Đam (born 1963) | | 13 November 2013 | 5 January 2023 | Nguyễn Tấn Dũng |
| 34 | 44 | — | Vũ Đức Đam (born 1963) | | 13 November 2013 | 5 January 2023 | Nguyễn Xuân Phúc |
| 34 | 44 | — | Vũ Đức Đam (born 1963) | | 13 November 2013 | 5 January 2023 | Phạm Minh Chính |
| 35 | 45 | 11 | Vương Đình Huệ (born 1957) | | 9 April 2016 | 11 June 2020 | Nguyễn Xuân Phúc |
| 36 | 46 | 15 | Trương Hòa Bình (permanent) (Note: from 16 August 2016) (born 1955) | | 9 April 2016 | 28 July 2021 | Nguyễn Xuân Phúc |
| 37 | 47 | — | Trịnh Đình Dũng (born 1956) | | 9 April 2016 | 7 April 2021 | Nguyễn Xuân Phúc |
| 38 | 48 | — | Lê Minh Khái (born 1964) | | 8 April 2021 | 26 August 2024 | Phạm Minh Chính |
| 39 | 49 | — | Lê Văn Thành (1962–2023) | | 8 April 2021 | 22 August 2023 | Phạm Minh Chính |
| 40 | 50 | — | Trần Hồng Hà (born 1964) | | 5 January 2023 | 8 April 2026 | Phạm Minh Chính |
| 41 | 51 | — | Trần Lưu Quang (born 1967) | | 5 January 2023 | 26 August 2024 | Phạm Minh Chính |
| 42 | 52 | — | Lê Thành Long (born 1963) | | 6 June 2024 | 8 April 2026 | Phạm Minh Chính |
| 43 | 53 | — | Nguyễn Hòa Bình (permanent) (Note: from 28 August 2024) (born 1958) | | 26 August 2024 | 8 April 2026 | Phạm Minh Chính |
| 44 | 54 | — | Hồ Đức Phớc (born 1963) | | 26 August 2024 | 8 April 2026 | Phạm Minh Chính |
| 45 | 55 | — | Bùi Thanh Sơn (born 1962) | | 26 August 2024 | 8 April 2026 | Phạm Minh Chính |
| 46 | 56 | — | Nguyễn Chí Dũng (born 1960) | | 18 February 2025 | 8 April 2026 | Phạm Minh Chính |
| 47 | 57 | — | Mai Văn Chính (born 1961) | | 18 February 2025 | 8 April 2026 | Phạm Minh Chính |
| 48 | 58 | — | Phạm Thị Thanh Trà (born 1964) | | 25 October 2025 | Incumbent | Phạm Minh Chính |
| 48 | 58 | — | Phạm Thị Thanh Trà (born 1964) | | 25 October 2025 | Incumbent | Lê Minh Hưng |
| 49 | 59 | — | Hồ Quốc Dũng (born 1966) | | 25 October 2025 | Incumbent | Phạm Minh Chính |
| 49 | 59 | — | Hồ Quốc Dũng (born 1966) | | 25 October 2025 | Incumbent | Lê Minh Hưng |
| 50 | 60 | — | Phạm Gia Túc (permanent) (born 1965) | | 8 April 2026 | Incumbent | Lê Minh Hưng |
| 51 | 61 | — | Phan Văn Giang (born 1960) | | 8 April 2026 | Incumbent | Lê Minh Hưng |
| 52 | 62 | — | Nguyễn Văn Thắng (born 1973) | | 8 April 2026 | Incumbent | Lê Minh Hưng |
| 53 | 63 | — | Lê Tiến Châu (born 1969) | | 8 April 2026 | Incumbent | Lê Minh Hưng |

== See also ==
- Prime Minister of Vietnam
- Vice President of Vietnam

== Bibliography ==
- Koh, David (July–August 2008). "Leadership Changes at the 10th Congress of the Vietnamese Communist Party". Asian Survey. 48 (4). University of California Press: 650–672. doi:10.1525/as.2008.48.4.650. JSTOR 10.1525/as.2008.48.4.650.
- Van, Canh Nguyen; Cooper, Earle (1983). Vietnam under Communism, 1975–1982. Hoover Press. ISBN 9780817978518.
