= Supreme People's Procuracy of Vietnam =

Public prosecutorial agency

Headed by the Prosecutor General, the Supreme People's Procuracy of Vietnam (Vietnamese: Viện kiểm sát nhân dân tối cao) has functions such as acting as the prosecutor before the People's Courts. The Supreme People's Procuracy has local and military subdivisions that include the district, provincial, and city levels. In accordance with the Constitution of Vietnam, the role of the public prosecutor is to surveillance and supervise the rule of all the organs of the State, ministries and ministerial-level agencies, administrative agencies (from central to local institutions) and individuals.

The People's Procuratorate has the tasks of contributing to the protection of Socialist legislation (as well as the protection of the Socialist regime) and the mastery of the people. The Procuratorate may also safeguard the assets of the State and the collective, and protect the life, health, property, freedom, honour and dignity of citizens—guaranteed to all acts violating the interests of the State, the collective, the legitimate rights and interests of the citizens are to be handled according to strict laws.

== Operations ==
The Supreme People's Procuracy of Vietnam has the power of supervision of legal compliance by other Ministries within the government of Vietnam, ministerial and other governmental departments, local departments, economic bodies, social organizations, people’s and armed units and Vietnamese citizens.

It has the power to initiate public prosecution and ensures uniform implementation of the law.

The Offices of the Supreme People’s Procuracy has operations at the local levels of Vietnam.
