= Death and state funeral of Võ Nguyên Giáp =

State funeral in Vietnam

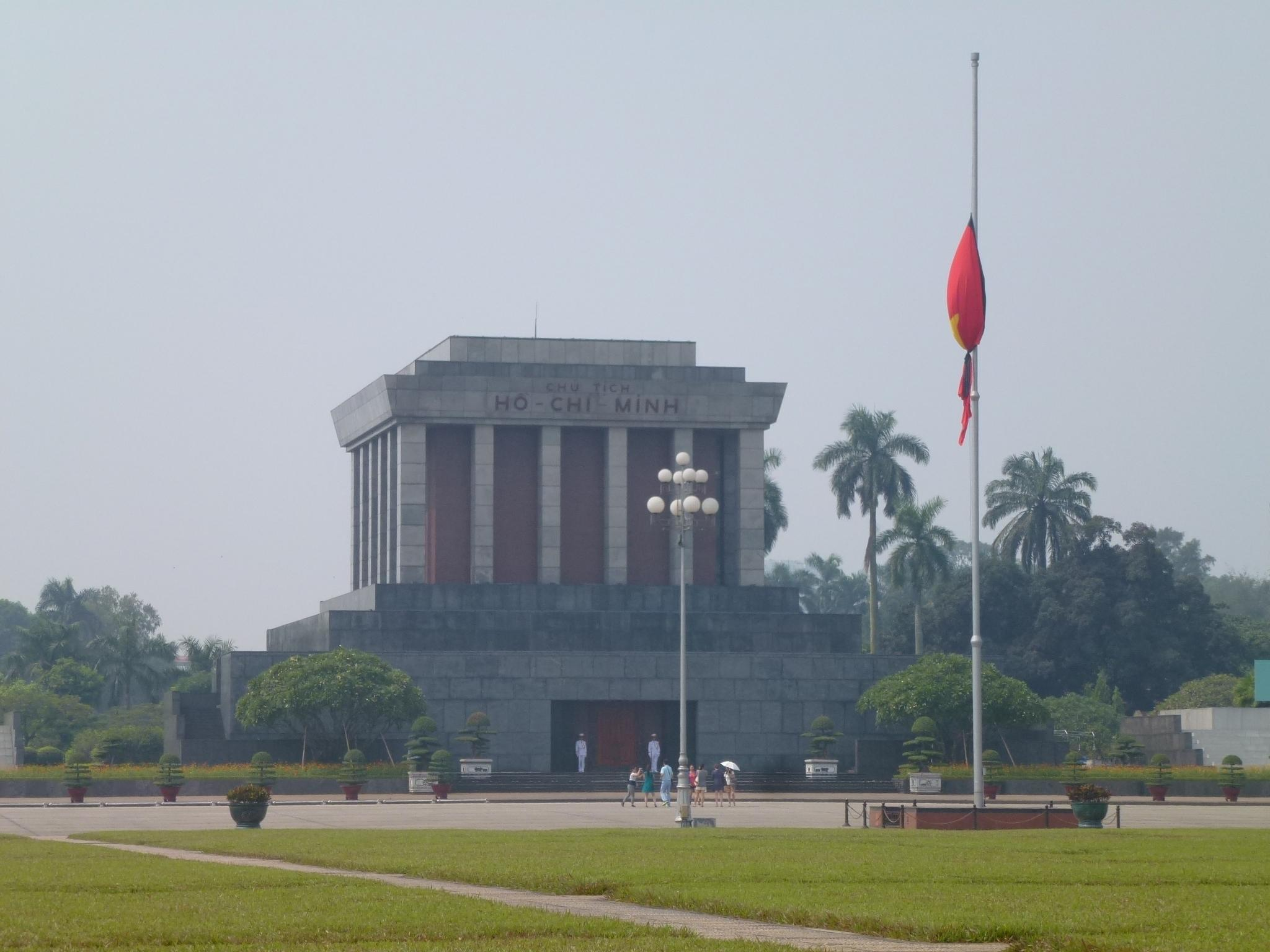
The National flag is flown at half-staff in front the Ho Chi Minh Mausoleum during Võ Nguyên Giáp's state funeral.

General Võ Nguyên Giáp, who led the Viet Minh forces during the First Indochina War and the North Vietnamese forces during the Vietnam War, died on October 4, 2013, after a long stay at the 108 Hospital in Hanoi. The Vietnam News Agency did not officially confirm it until a day later, when they announced a two-day national funeral to be held the following week, on October 12 and 13, which would be presided by all top-ranking government officials. His body lay in state at the National Funeral House in Hanoi on October 12, before being buried in his home province of Quảng Bình the following day. The funeral was broadcast live nationwide by the state broadcasters VTV and VOV.

== Death ==
Giap was hospitalized at the 108 Hospital on September 24, 2009. After his 100th birthday, Giap's health deteriorated as he slowly lost the ability to both speak and walk. In 2011, VTV showed footage of him voting (from a wheelchair) to dispel rumors of his failing health. At 6:09 PM on October 4, 2013, he died after a four-year stay at the hospital, at the age of 102. According to East Asian age reckoning, he was 103.

== Reactions ==
=== Domestic ===
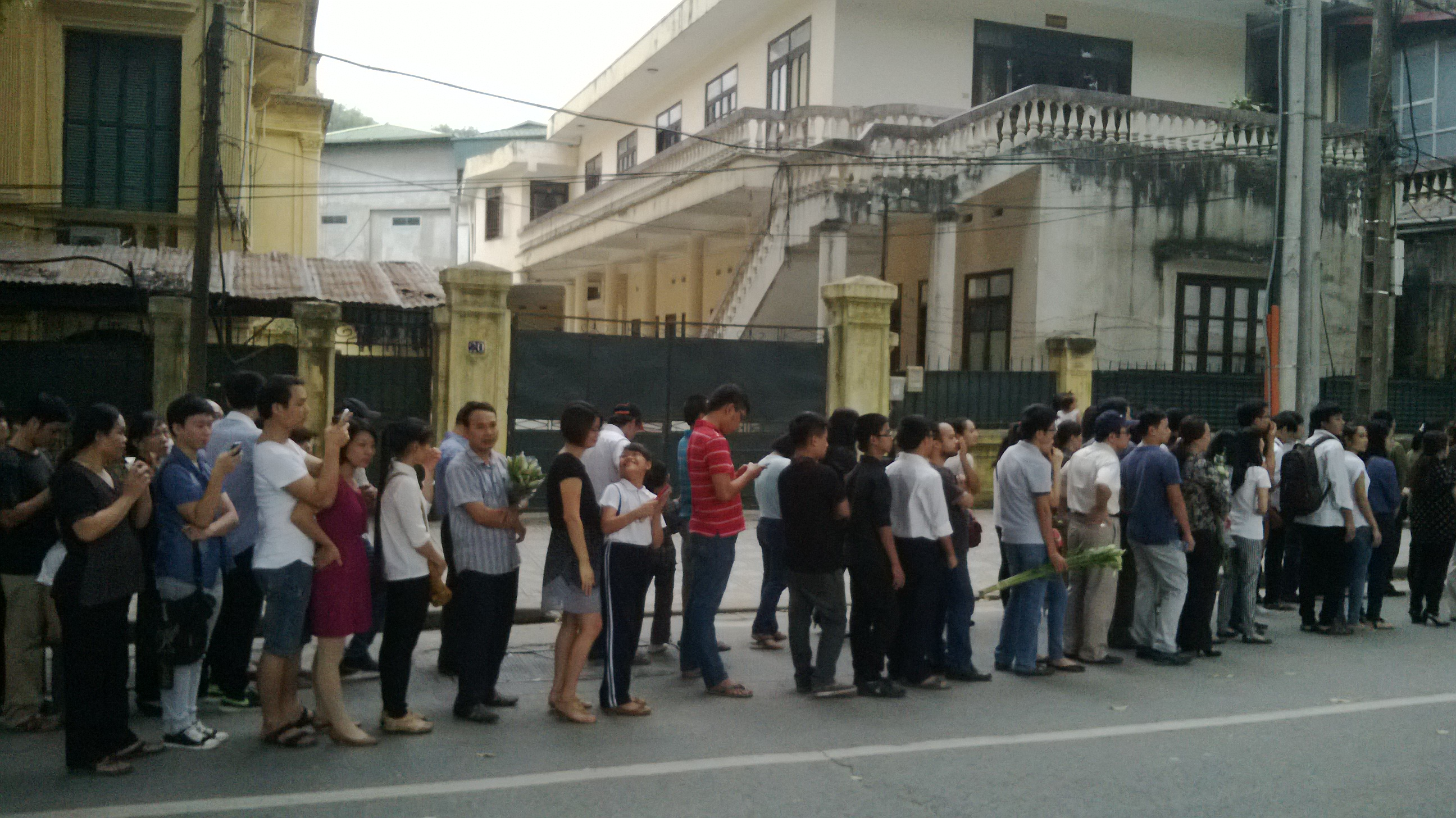
People lining up to pay their respects at Giap's private residence at Hoang Dieu Street, Hanoi

In Vietnam, news of Giáp's death spread quickly through the local social media, especially through Facebook, before state-owned media began to pick it up. VnExpress reported the news more than four hours later, and other domestic media began to report the story. However, before an official acknowledgement from the government, the media could only briefly mention the news without any commentary.

The following day, the Vietnam News Agency acknowledged the news that Giáp had died and announced a national funeral. There was an immediate outpouring of grief in the country, and many people regarded Giáp as the second-most important figure of Vietnam's 20th-century history, after Ho Chi Minh. His family opened his residence for visitations and hundreds of thousands of people came to pay their respects before the funeral.

=== International ===
- Brazil: President of Brazil Dilma Rousseff sent condolences to President of Vietnam Trương Tấn Sang.
- Cuba: President Raúl Castro expressed his condolences to the people of Vietnam and said that "the Cuban people will always remember, with admiration and respect, the figure of General Giap and our Revolutionary Armed Forces for their invaluable contribution to the Cuban military doctrine."
- France: Foreign Minister Laurent Fabius praised Giáp: "I am saddened to learn of the death of General Giap. He was a great Vietnamese patriot, loved and respected by all his people and for the prominent role he played in founding the independence of his country."
- Democratic People's Republic of Korea: President of the Presidium of the DPRK Supreme People's Assembly Kim Yong Nam sent a message of condolence to the funeral commission. The message stressed that Giáp "was a prominent state and political activist devoted his all to the national liberation struggle and cause of socialism in Vietnam from his early years true to the intention of President Ho Chi Minh and close friend of the Korean people made a contribution to the friendly and cooperative relations between the DPRK and Vietnam."
- Laos: General Secretary Choummaly Sayasone of the Lao People's Revolutionary Party as well as officials from the Central Committee and National Assembly sent messages of condolences to their Vietnamese counterparts. The message read that "the general tirelessly devoted his wisdom and energy to throwing off the yoke of foreign colonialism" and that "[h]e contributed significantly to enriching the friendly relations, special solidarity and comprehensive cooperation between Laos and Vietnam."
- Nicaragua: First Lady Rosario Murillo expressed her condolences on behalf of the people of Nicaragua.
- Sahrawi Republic: President Mohamed Abdelaziz sent a letter of condolences to Vietnamese President Trương Tấn Sang on behalf of the government and people of the Sahrawi Republic, remembering the January 1976 meeting in Algeria between Giáp and POLISARIO founder El-Ouali Mustapha Sayed, an encounter which embodied the "strong solidarity between the Sahrawi and Vietnamese people in their common fight against foreign domination and occupation."
- Singapore: The government of Singapore said that it was saddened by the death of Võ Nguyên Giáp and that he "played a pivotal role in Vietnam's fight for independence."
- Venezuela: President Nicolás Maduro expressed his condolences for the death of Võ Nguyên Giáp.

== State funeral ==
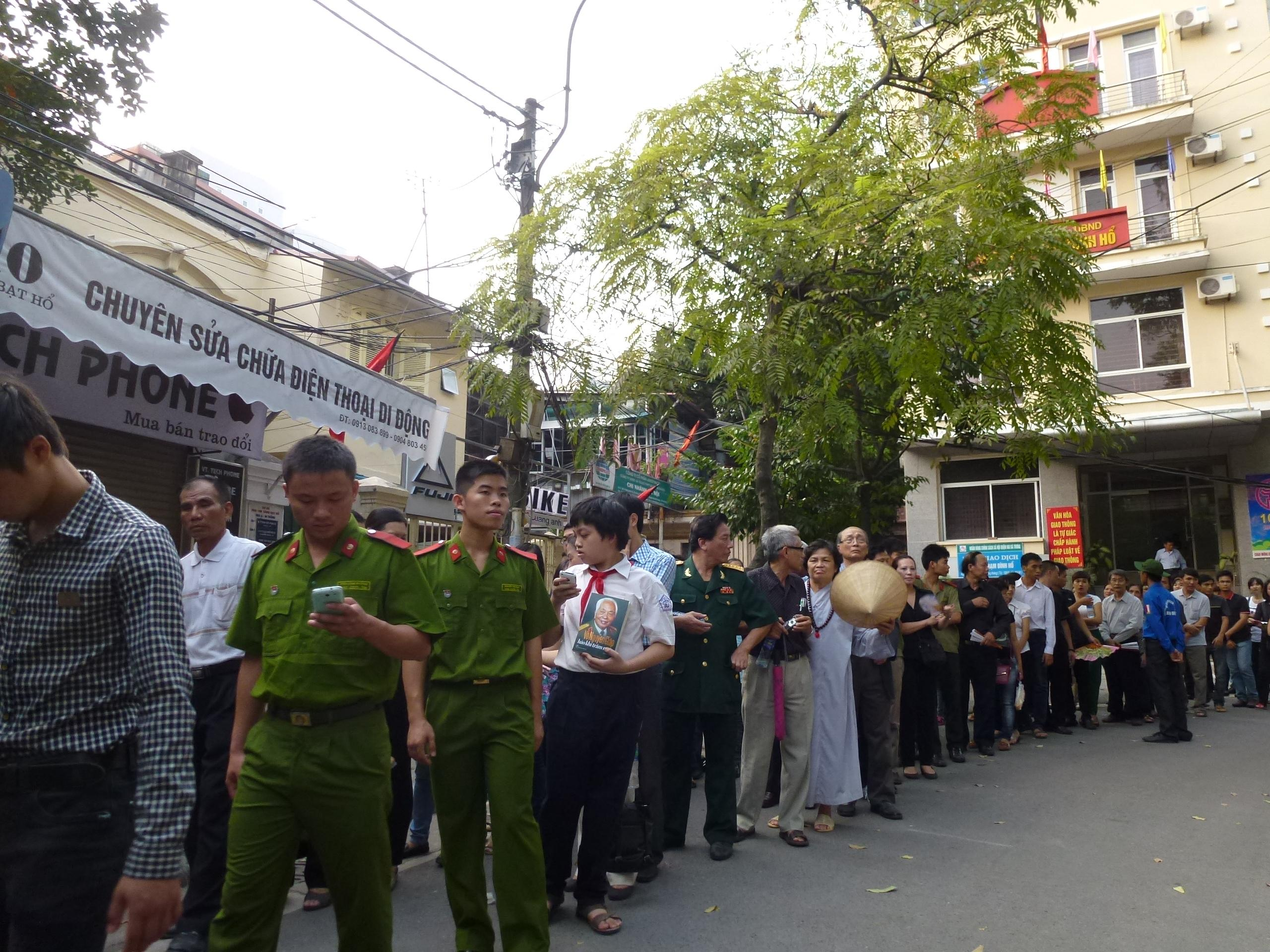
People lining up to pay respects to General Võ Nguyên Giáp at the National Funeral Hall in Hanoi. The teenager standing behind the two uniformed Vietnamese policemen is a member of the Ho Chi Minh Young Pioneer Organization holding a book of a biography about Giap.

Immediately after news of Giáp's death spread but before it was officially confirmed, there was widespread speculation about the nature of his funeral. According to current regulations, only people holding or having held the top positions of general secretary, president, prime minister, or chairman of the National Assembly are entitled to a national funeral (quốc tang). Giáp, who was a former Politburo member and a former deputy prime minister, was automatically entitled to a state funeral (lễ tang cấp nhà nước). However, protocols allowed for exceptions when the deceased's stature is higher than their official position.

Upon acknowledging Giáp's death, the Vietnamese government announced plans for a national funeral to be held on October 12 and 13. The Funeral Committee consisted of 30 people, headed by General Secretary Nguyễn Phú Trọng. The National Funeral Arrangements Committee, headed by deputy prime minister and Politburo member Nguyễn Xuân Phúc, was tasked with making the arrangements for the funeral and burial ceremonies. Giáp's body was laid in state at the National Funeral Hall, where mourners could pay their respect beginning on October 12. While the main ceremony took place in Hanoi, simultaneous memorials were also held at the Reunification Palace in Ho Chi Minh City and the Provincial People's Committee Office in Quảng Bình, his home province. Immediately after the funeral service on October 13, his body was flown to Quảng Bình, where he was buried in Vũng Chùa - Đảo Yến, a location near the coast. As his resting place is at a remote location, workers had to quickly pave the road to facilitate the burial.

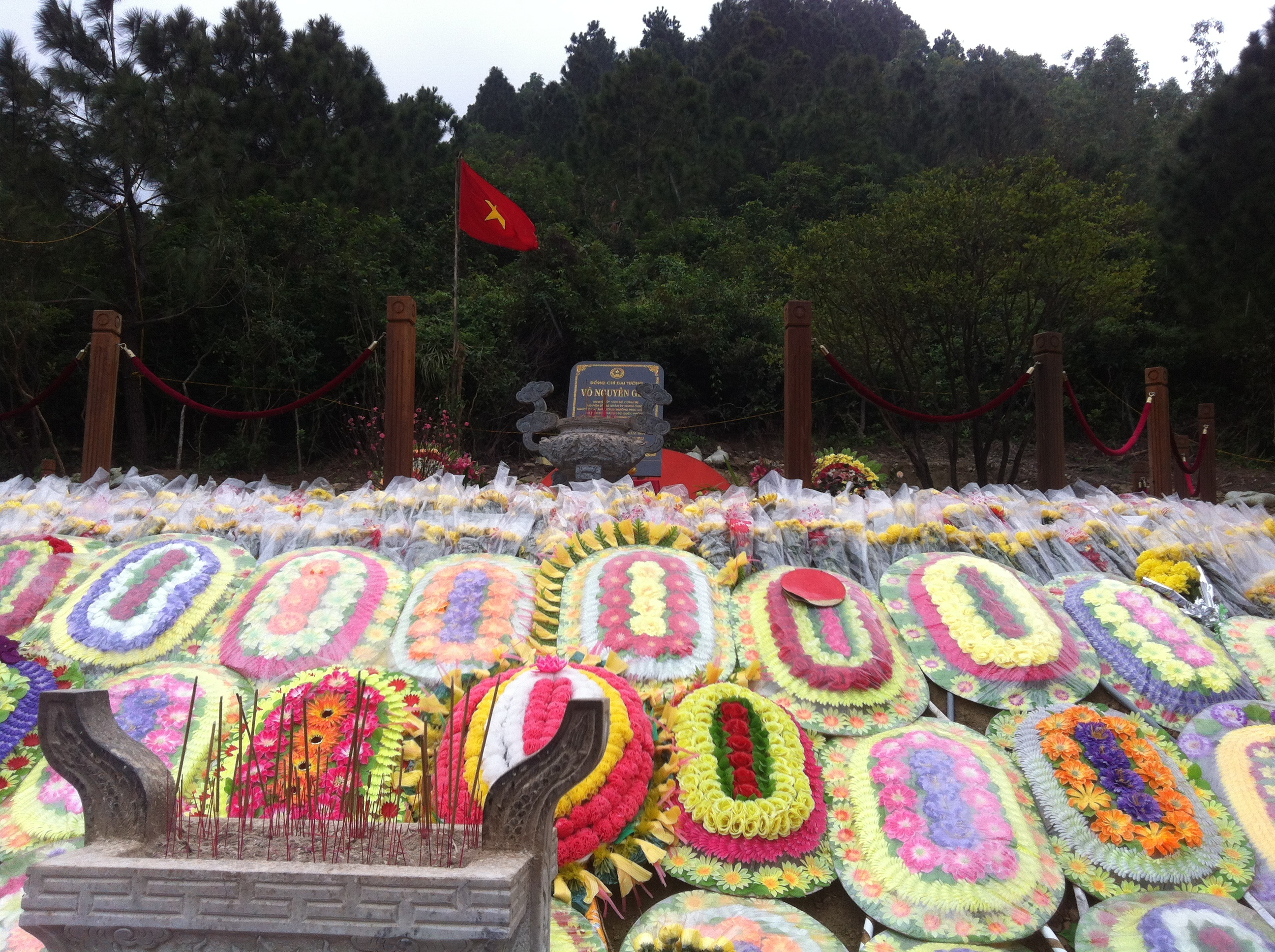
Tomb of Võ Nguyên Giáp in Quảng Bình province
