= Nguyễn Khánh (communist) =

Vietnamese politician (1928–2023)

Nguyễn Khánh (31 March 1928 – 19 July 2023) was a Vietnamese politician. He was deputy prime minister from 1987 to 1997.
