= Battles of Phai Khắt and Nà Ngần =

Battle of Phai Khat - Na Ngan
- Part of French Indochina in World War II, the South-East Asian theatre of World War II and the Pacific Theater of World War II
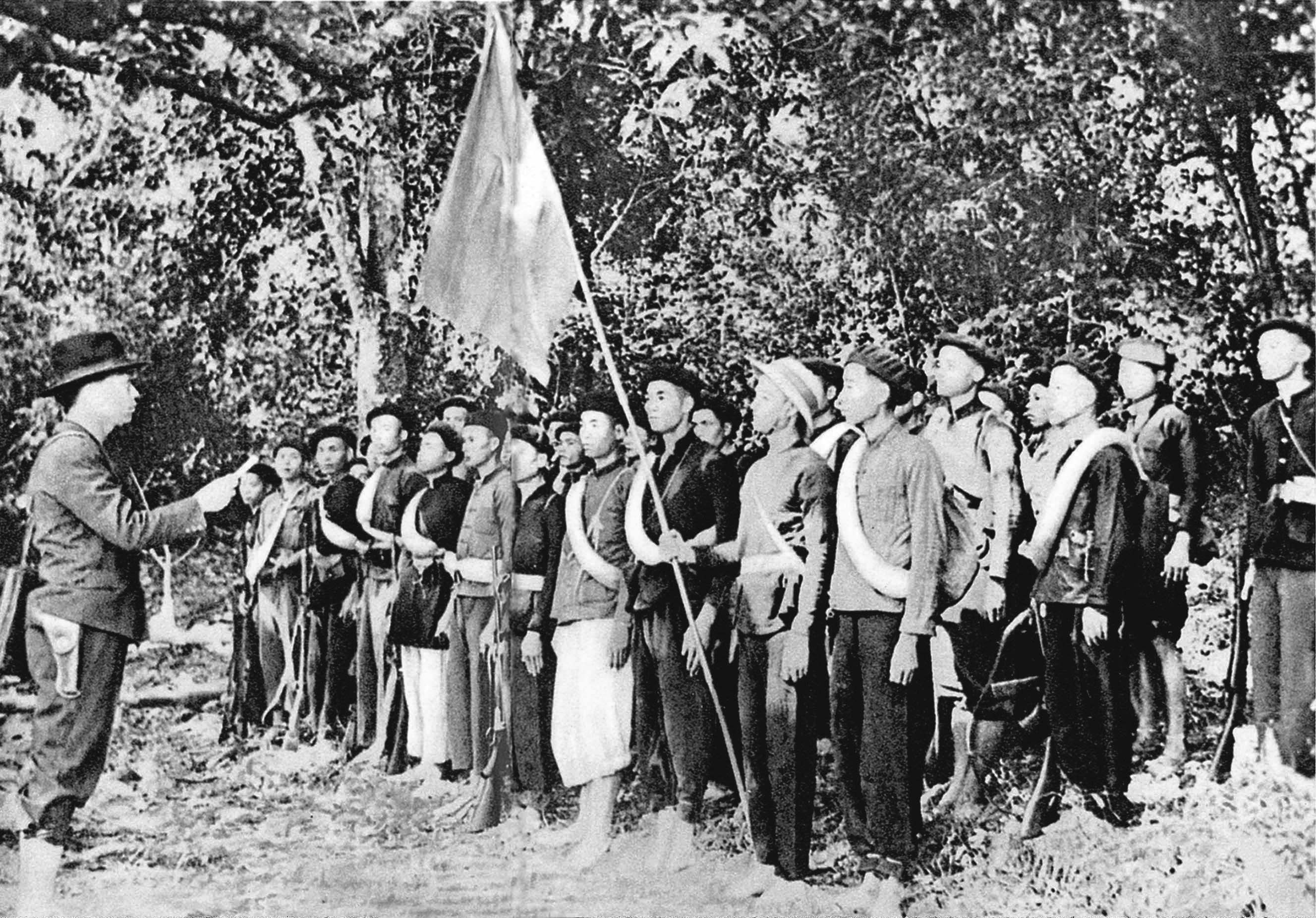
- The Armed Propaganda Unit with Vo Nguyen Giap
Date	25 – 26 December 1944
Location	Phai Khat and Na Ngan, Cao Bằng Province, French Indochina
Result	Viet Minh victory

Belligerents
Vichy France: French Indochina	(North Vietnam) Việt Minh (Armed Propaganda Unit)

Commanders and leaders
(French Fourth Republic) Unknown French Officers	(North Vietnam) Võ Nguyên Giáp

Strength
Unknown	34 soldiers (Tran Hung Dao platoon)

Casualties and losses
2 French officers killed 1 armoury guard wounded	None

The Battle of Phai Khat - Na Ngan was the first battle ever fought by the People's Army of Vietnam (PAVN). Taking place in December 1944, it involved a series of raids by the Viet Minh Armed Propaganda Unit (Tran Hung Dao platoon) on French outposts at Phai Khat and Na Ngan. Personally led by Vo Nguyen Giap, the force consisted of 31 men and 3 women armed with two revolvers, seventeen rifles, one light machine gun, and fourteen breech-loading rifles dating from the Russo-Japanese War. The first raid was on Phai Khat outpost, in which the commander was killed and its armoury seized, making the colonial troops surrender without a fight. The second took place the following day at Na Ngan where another officer was killed. These raids gave the Viet Minh its first victory, and defectors from the garrisons bolstered their ranks.

== Background ==
In 1940, Japan had invaded French Indochina and occupied it. During the period of occupation, the Viet Minh expanded their size, and in September 1944 the first Revolutionary Party Military Conference was held. During the conference, it was agreed that it was time to take the military struggle forward into a new phase. Subsequently, the formation of the Vietnam Liberation Army was proclaimed, with Giáp as its commander. Ho Chi Minh directed him to establish Armed Propaganda Brigades and the first one, consisting of thirty-one men and three women, was formed in December 1944 and named the Tran Hung Dao Platoon.

== Battle ==
In late December, two outposts in Cao Bang province were selected. Using a 12 year old named Hoang as a spy, the Viet Minh discovered that they were mainly guarded by colonial soldiers. At 5 pm on December 25, Viet Minh troops dressed in French uniforms entered Phai Khat and seized its armoury, wounding the guard and killing the French commander in the process, making the unarmed garrison promptly surrender. This was repeated the following day at Na Ngan, with the commander also being killed and the garrison surrendering after a short fight.

== Aftermath ==
The Viet Minh seized 40 rifles, 2 sidearms and 3000 piastres during these raids. They also captured 37 prisoners (including a French NCO), most of whom either defected or were released to go home. The minor victory gave the Viet Minh its first experience in combat and was the first of many battles against the French.
