= Vũ Khoan =

Vietnamese politician (1937–2023)

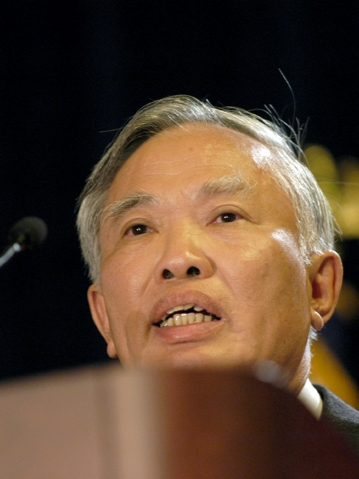
- Khoan in 2005

Deputy Prime Minister of Vietnam
- In office August 12, 2002 – June 28, 2006
- Prime Minister: Phan Văn Khải
- Preceded by: Nguyễn Mạnh Cầm
- Succeeded by: Trương Vĩnh Trọng

Secretariat of the Communist Party of Vietnam
- In office April, 2001 – April, 2006
- General Secretary: Nông Đức Mạnh

Ministry of Industry and Trade
- In office January 28, 2000 – August, 2002
- Prime Minister: Phan Văn Khải
- Preceded by: Trương Đình Tuyển
- Succeeded by: Trương Đình Tuyển

Ministry of Foreign Affairs
- In office 1998–2000

Personal details
- Born: 7 October 1937 Phú Xuyên, Hà Đông, Hanoi
- Died: 21 June 2023 (aged 85) 108 Hospital, Hanoi
- Party: Communist Party of Vietnam
- Spouse: Hồ Thể Lan (1938)

Vũ Khoan (October 7, 1937 – June 21, 2023) was a Vietnamese politician and diplomat. He held the position of Secretary of the Central Committee of the Communist Party of Vietnam, Deputy Prime Minister in charge of Vietnam's external economy from August 2002 to the end of June 2006. He made positive contributions to the negotiation process of the Vietnam-US Trade Agreement and Vietnam's accession to the World Trade Organization (WTO).

== Born in the cadet ==
He was born on October 7, 1937, from Phú Xuyên, Hà Tây (now part of Hanoi).

When the French army opened fire to retake Indochina, he worked as a liaison for the Việt Minh government. In 1949, he was sent back to Việt Bắc, where he studied at the Vietnam Cavalry School. In 1951, he was selected by the Government of the Democratic Republic of Vietnam and went to study at "Nanning School of Education", then transferred to "Nanning-Guilin School of Education" (also known as Vietnamese Children's School). South in Guangxi, China).

== Family ==
He was married to Mrs. Hồ Thể Lan, former Director of the Press Department, Spokesperson of the Ministry of Foreign Affairs and the daughter of Professor Doctor Hồ Đắc Di. The two met from the same class of students who were sent to study in the Soviet Union in 1954.

== Death ==
According to information from the Central Committee for Health Care and Protection, after a period of illness, despite being cared for by the Party, State, a group of professors and doctors, and wholeheartedly cared for by the family, But due to old age and weak health, he died at 7:05 am on June 21, 2023, at 108 Hospital, (aged 85).
