= Tạ Quang Bửu =

Vietnamese politician

Professor Tạ Quang Bửu
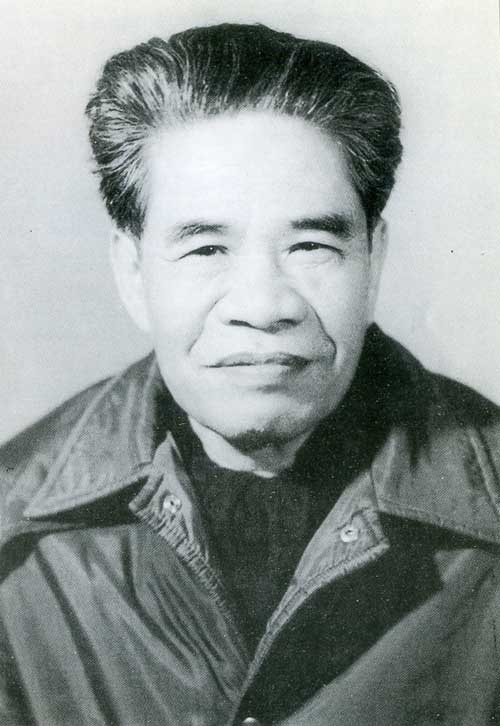

4th Minister of Defence
- In office August 1947 – August 1948
- Prime Minister: Hồ Chí Minh
- Preceded by: Võ Nguyên Giáp
- Succeeded by: Võ Nguyên Giáp

Personal details
- Born: 1910 Nam Đàn, Nghệ An, Protectorate of Annam
- Died: 1986 (aged 75–76) Hanoi, Vietnam

Military service
- Allegiance: Democratic Republic of Vietnam
- Branch/service: People's Army of Vietnam

Tạ Quang Bửu (1910–1986) was a Vietnamese scientist and politician. Bửu was the fourth Minister of Defence of Vietnam (August 1947 to August 1948) and held the position of Deputy Minister of Defence from 1954 to 1958.

In 2015, the Ministry of Science and Technology established the Tạ Quang Bửu Prize – an annual prize to encourage and honor scientists with outstanding achievement in basic research in the fields of natural sciences and engineering.
