= Nam Đàn district =

Coordinates: 18°41′50″N 105°30′03″E

Nam Đàn district Huyện Nam Đàn
- District
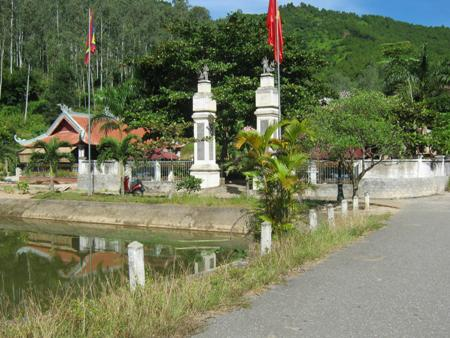
- In front of a temple in Nam Đàn

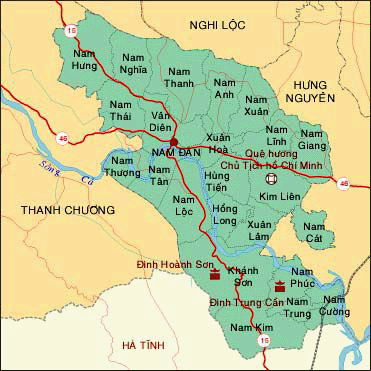
- Map of Nam Đàn district
- Country: Vietnam
- Region: North Central Coast
- Province: Nghệ An
- Capital: Nam Đàn

Area
  - Total: 114 sq mi (294 km^{2})

Population (2003)
  - Total: 158,006
- Time zone: UTC+07:00 (Indochina Time)

Nam Đàn is a rural district of Nghệ An province in the North Central Coast region of Vietnam. As of 2003 the district had a population of 158,006. The district covers an area of 294 km^{2} (114 sq mi). The district capital lies at Nam Đàn.
