= Central Military Hospital 108 =

108 Military Central Hospital
- Vietnam People's Army

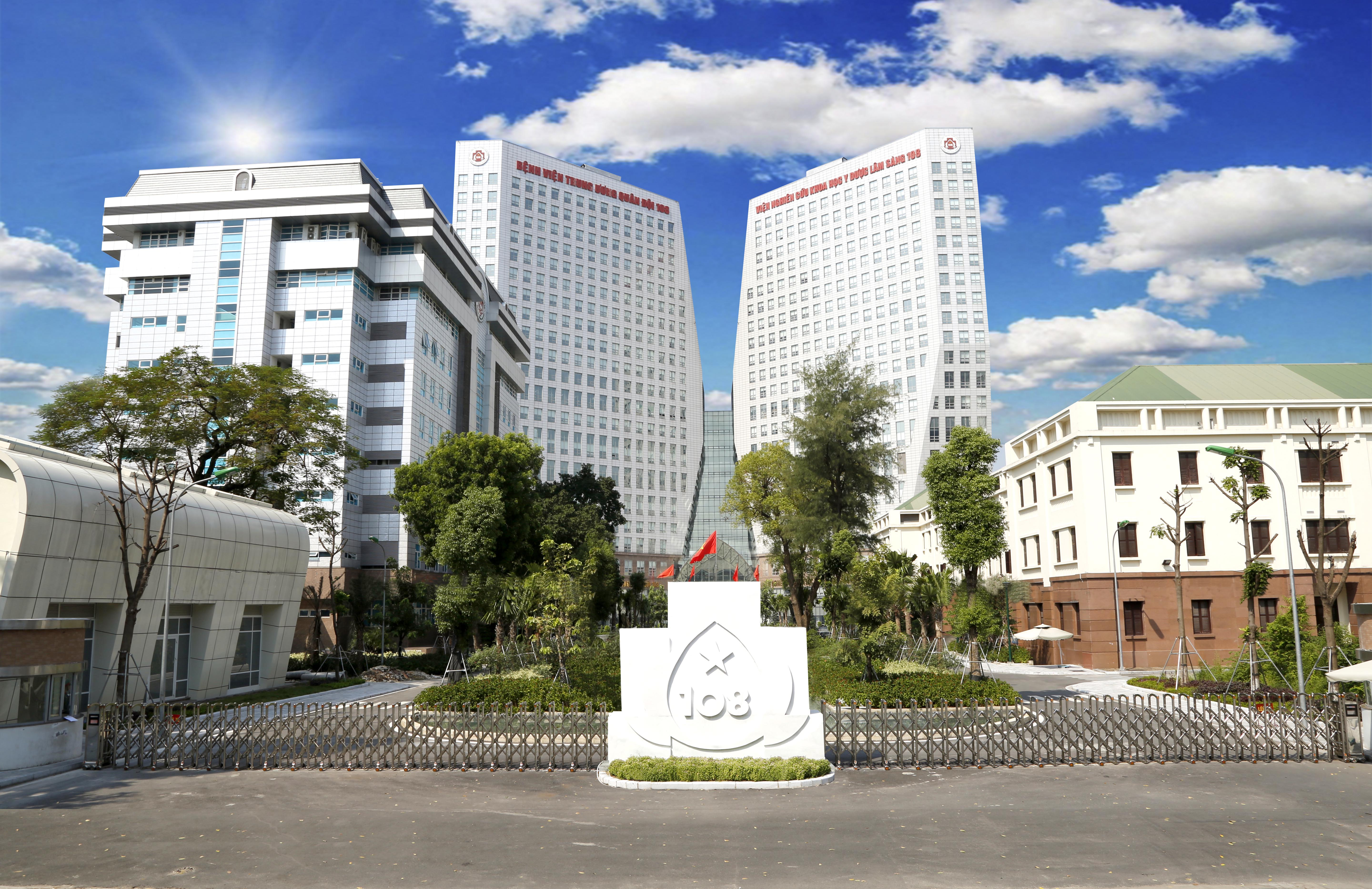
- The 108 Military Central Hospital, Trần Hưng Đạo Street entrance

Geography
- Location: 1 Trần Hưng Đạo Street, Hai Bà Trưng District, Hanoi, Vietnam
- Coordinates: 21°01′05.18″N 105°51′41.81″E

Organisation
- Care system: Public
- Type: Specialist

Services
- Speciality: Trauma, Cancer, Surgery

History
- Founded: 1951

Links
- Website: www.benhvien108.vn
- Lists: Hospitals in Vietnam

The 108 Military Central Hospital (Vietnamese: Bệnh viện Trung ương Quân đội 108) is a Vietnamese nationally-administered hospital affiliated with the Vietnam Ministry of National Defence. Designed as a general hospital, a strategic final-level care provider, and a special-grade national hospital, it is mandated to provide medical services to senior officers of the Communist Party, the State, and the People's Army of Vietnam as well as international and other service users.

== History ==
Originally known as Thuy Khau Hospital and established in 1950 to serve the Border campaign in Thuy Khau - China, the 108 Military Central Hospital was officially founded on April 1, 1951, in Lang Nong, Yen Trach, Phu Luong, Thái Nguyên Province, with the initial name - Yen Trach Central Hospital. In July 1951, the hospital was renamed "The 8 Sub-Hospital". Since its relocation to the capital in 1954, the hospital underwent various name changes, including The 108 Military Hospital (June 1956) and The 108 Military Medical Institute (1960).

The current location of the hospital was formerly Don Thuy Hospital, originally built by the French army in 1894 and known as Lanessan Hospital. This location now houses The 108 Military Central Hospital and The Vietnam-Soviet Friendship Hospital.

In 1995, the hospital was officially named "The 108 Military Central Hospital". On September 6, 2002, it was transferred from the General Department of Logistics to be affiliated with the Ministry of Defence of Vietnam.

On May 8, 2003, the Minister of National Defence decided to grant Central Military Hospital 108 the signal name of The 108 Research Institute of Clinical Medical and Pharmaceutical Sciences under the Ministry of National Defense. The hospital possesses its own seal and serves a role in postgraduate training, offering programs for Level-1, Level-2 Specialist Doctor, and M.D (Doctor of Medicine).

In 2024, Nguyễn Phú Trọng, the general secretary of the Communist Party of Vietnam, died from illness in this hospital on 19 July.

== Vietnamese-German Center for Medical Research ==
The Vietnamese-German Center for Medical Research (VG-CARE) was founded in 2015 as a collaboration between the hospital and Germany's Institute of Tropical Medicine at the University of Tübingen.
