= 6th Central Committee of the Communist Party of Vietnam =

Central Committee of the Communist Party of Vietnam

6th Central Committee
- Symbol of the Communist Party of Vietnam

18 December 1986 – 27 June 1991 (4 years, 191 days) Overview
- Type: Central Committee of the Communist Party of Vietnam
- Election: 6th National Congress

Leadership
- General Secretary: Nguyễn Văn Linh
- Politburo: Official: 13; Alternate: 1
- Secretariat: 13 members

Members
- Total: 124 members

Alternates
- Total: 49 alternates

The 6th Central Committee of the Communist Party of Vietnam (CPV) was elected at the 6th CPV National Congress. It elected the 6th Politburo and the 6th Secretariat.

== Plenums ==
The Central Committee (CC) is not a permanent institution. Instead, it convenes plenary sessions between party congresses. When the CC is not in session, decision-making powers are delegated to its internal bodies; that is, the Politburo and the Secretariat. None of these organs are permanent bodies either; typically, they convene several times a month.

Plenary Sessions of the 6th Central Committee
Plenum	Date	Length	Ref.
1st Plenary Session	17 December 1986	1 day	
2nd Plenary Session	1 April 1987	1 day	
3rd Plenary Session	20 August 1987	1 day	
4th Plenary Session	8–12 January 1988	5 days	
5th Plenary Session	14–20 June 1988	7 days	
6th Plenary Session	20–29 March 1989	10 days	
7th Plenary Session	15–24 August 1989	10 days	
8th Plenary Session	12–27 March 1990	15 days	
9th Plenary Session	16–28 August 1990	13 days	
10th Plenary Session	17–26 November 1990	10 days	
11th Plenary Session	7–12 December 1990	8 days	
12th Plenary Session	18 May 1991	1 day	

== Composition ==
=== Members ===
Members of the 6th Central Committee of the Communist Party of Vietnam
Name	5th CC	7th CC	BY	PM	Birthplace	Education	Ethnicity	Gender	Ref.
Nguyễn Văn An	Alternate	Reelected	1937	1959	Nam Định province	Electrical engineering	Kinh	Male	
Lê Đức Anh	Old	Reelected	1920	1938	Thừa Thiên Huế province	None	Kinh	Male	
Trần Xuân Bách	Old	Not	1924	—	Nam Định province	—	Kinh	Male	
Phạm Bái	Old	Not	1922	—	Hải Phòng City	—	Kinh	Male	
Nguyễn Thanh Bình	Old	Not	1918	1939	Bắc Ninh province	—	Kinh	Male	
Nguyễn Đức Bình	Old	Reelected	1927	1945	Hà Tĩnh province	Philosophy	Kinh	Male	
Lê Đức Bình	Old	Reelected	1930	—	Ninh Bình province	None	Kinh	Male	
Nguyễn Thới Bưng	New	Reelected	1927	—	Tây Ninh province	None	Kinh	Male	
Nguyễn Mạnh Cầm	New	Reelected	1929	—	Nghệ An province	Russian studies	Kinh	Male	
Hoàng Cầm	Old	Not	1920	1947	Hà Đông City	—	Kinh	Male	
Nguyễn Kỳ Cẩm	Old	Reelected	1929	—	Nghệ Tĩnh province	—	Kinh	Male	
Huỳnh Văn Cẩn	New	Reelected					Kinh	Male	
Nguyễn Minh Châu	Old	Not	1921	—	Tây Ninh province	—	Kinh	Male	
Lữ Minh Châu	New	Not	1929	—	Cà Mau province	—	Kinh	Male	
Nguyễn Văn Chi	Old	Reelected	1945	1965	Đà Nẵng City	Economic Management	Kinh	Male	
Võ Trần Chí	New	Reelected	1927	1946	Long An province	None	Kinh	Male	
Cao Đăng Chiếm	Old	Not	1921	1946	Mỹ Tho province	—	Kinh	Male	
Đỗ Chính	Old	Reelected	1926	1946	Hưng Yên province	None	Kinh	Male	
Nguyễn Văn Chính	Old	Reelected	1924	1946	Hồ Chí Minh City	None	Kinh	Male	
Nguyễn Chơn	New	Reelected	1927	1949	Đà Nẵng City	Military science	Kinh	Male	
Nguyễn Huy Chương	New	Not	1926	—	Quảng Nam province	—	Kinh	Male	
Nguyễn Nhiêu Cốc	Promoted	Reelected	1930	—	Hòa Bình province	Planning	Mường	Male	
Võ Chí Công	Old	Not	1912	1935	Đà Nẵng City	—	Kinh	Male	
Trần Hữu Đắc	Old	Not					Kinh	Male	
Lê Quang Đạo	Old	Not	1921	1940	Bắc Ninh province	—	Kinh	Male	
Nguyễn Cảnh Dinh	Alternate	Reelected	1934	—	Nghệ An province	Irrigation	Kinh	Male	
Nguyễn Thị Định	Old	Not	1920	1938	Bến Tre province	—	Kinh	Female	
Trần Độ	Old	Not	1923	1940	Thái Bình province	—	Kinh	Male	
Trần Đông	Old	Not	1925	1946	Hải Phòng City	—	Kinh	Male	
Nguyễn Văn Đức	Old	Not	1923	—	Vĩnh Phú province	—	Kinh	Male	
Văn Tiến Dũng	Old	Not	1917	1937	Hà Nội City	—	Kinh	Male	
Phạm Thế Duyệt	Alternate	Reelected	1936	1965	Hải Dương province	Mining engineering & economic management	Kinh	Male	
Phạm Đình Dy	New	Not	1928	—	Hà Nội City	—	Kinh	Male	
Lê Văn Dỹ	Alternate	Reelected	1934	1960	Long An province	Chemistry	Kinh	Male	
Võ Nguyên Giáp	Old	Not	1911	1930	Quảng Bình province	—	Kinh	Male	
Hồng Hà	Alternate	Reelected	1928	1947	Nam Định province	—	Kinh	Male	
Vũ Ngọc Hải	Alternate	Reelected	1931	—	Bình Trị Thiên	Electrical engineering	Kinh	Male	
Nguyễn Thị Hằng	New	Reelected	1944	—	Hải Phòng City	Economics	Kinh	Female	
Cù Thị Hậu	New	Reelected	1944	—	Phú Thọ province	—	Kinh	Female	
Lê Ngọc Hiền	Old	Not	1928	1945	Hà Đông City	—	Kinh	Male	
Nguyễn Văn Hiệu	Alternate	Reelected	1938	—	Hà Tây province	Physics	Kinh	Male	
Trương Mỹ Hoa	Promoted	Reelected	1945	—	Tiền Giang province	Economics & the arts	Kinh	Female	
Nguyễn Hoà	Old	Not	1927	1946	Hưng Yên province	Military science	Kinh	Male	
Hà Trọng Hoà	Alternate	Not					Kinh	Male	
Trần Hoàn	New	Reelected	1928	1948	Quảng Trị province	—	Kinh	Male	
Vũ Tuyên Hoàng	Alternate	Reelected	1938	—	Hà Nội City	Agricultural science	Kinh	Male	
Nguyễn Văn Hơn	Old	Reelected	1929	1946	An Giang province	—	Kinh	Male	
Vũ Thị Hồng	Old	Not					Kinh	Female	
Phạm Hưng	Alternate	Died	1927	1946	Hải Hưng province	—	Kinh	Male	
Hà Thiết Hùng	Alternate	Not	1929	—	—	—	Tày	Male	
Phạm Hùng	Old	Not	1912	1930	Vĩnh Long province	—	Kinh	Male	
Trần Quốc Hương	Old	Not	1924	1943	Hà Nam province	—	Kinh	Male	
Nguyễn Đình Hương	New	Reelected	1930	1948	Nghệ An province	—	Kinh	Male	
Đặng Hữu	Alternate	Reelected	1930	—	Bình Định province	Transportation engineering	Kinh	Male	
Nguyễn Xuân Hữu	Old	Not	1923	1946	Quảng Nam province	—	Kinh	Male	
Phạm Văn Hy	Old	Reelected	1931	—	Nam Hà province	—	Kinh	Male	
Phan Văn Khải	Old	Reelected	1933	1959	Hồ Chí Minh City	Economics	Kinh	Male	
Nguyễn Khánh	Alternate	Reelected	1928	—	Hà Tây province	Philosophy	Kinh	Male	
Nguyễn Nam Khánh	Old	Reelected	1927	1946	Bình Định province	—	Kinh	Male	
Đoàn Khuê	Old	Reelected	1923	—	Quảng Trị province	Military science	Kinh	Male	
Trần Kiên	Old	Not	1920	1945	Quảng Ngãi province	—	Kinh	Male	
Lê Văn Kiến	New	Reelected	1926	—	Long An province	—	Kinh	Male	
Võ Văn Kiệt	Old	Reelected	1922	1939	Vĩnh Long province	None	Kinh	Male	
Đặng Xuân Kỳ	Promoted	Reelected	1931	—	Nam Định province	Philosophy	Kinh	Male	
Vũ Lập	Old	Not	1924	—	Cao Bằng province	—	Tày	Male	
Trịnh Văn Lâu	New	Reelected	1929	—	Cửu Long Province	—	Kinh	Male	
Đinh Nho Liêm	Old	Not					Kinh	Male	
Phan Thanh Liêm	Old	Not	1933	—	Thừa Thiên Huế province	Mechanical engineering	Kinh	Male	
Nguyễn Thị Ngọc Liên	Old	Not	1943	—	Bình Dương province	—	Kinh	Female	
Nguyễn Văn Linh	Old	Not	1915	1936	Hưng Yên province	—	Kinh	Male	
Phạm Tâm Long	New	Reelected	1928	1946	Hà Tây province	Military science	Kinh	Male	
Trần Đức Lương	Alternate	Reelected	1937	1961	Quảng Ngãi province	Geological engineering	Kinh	Male	
Bùi Danh Lưu	New	Reelected	1935	—	Phú Thọ province	Transportation engineering	Kinh	Male	
Đào Đình Luyện	New	Reelected	1929	1945	Thái Bình province	Military science	Kinh	Male	
Nông Đức Mạnh	Promoted	Reelected	1940	1963	Bắc Kạn Province	Economics & carpentry	Tày	Male	
Vũ Mão	Old	Reelected	1939	—	Nam Định province	Agricultural engineering & economics	Kinh	Male	
Hoàng Trường Minh	Old	Not	1922	1945	Bắc Kạn province	Agricultural economics	Tày	Male	
Y Một	Old	Not	1939	1957	Kon Tum province	—	Giẻ Triêng	Female	
Đỗ Mười	Old	Reelected	1917	1939	Hà Nội City	None	Kinh	Male	
Lê Huy Ngọ	Promoted	Reelected	1938	—	Thanh Hoá province	Agricultural engineering	Kinh	Male	
Bùi Thiện Ngộ	New	Reelected	1929	1947	Đồng Nai province	—	Kinh	Male	
Đàm Văn Nguỵ	New	Reelected	1927	1945	Cao Bằng province	—	Kinh	Male	
Đồng Sĩ Nguyên	Old	Not	1923	1938	Quảng Bình province	Military science	Kinh	Male	
Lê Thanh Nhàn	New	Reelected	1932	—	Cửu Long Province	—	Kinh	Male	
Huỳnh Văn Niềm	New	Reelected	1931	1949	—	—	Kinh	Male	
Nguyễn Niệm	New	Reelected	1927	1945	Nghệ Tĩnh province	—	Kinh	Male	
Vũ Oanh	Old	Reelected	1924	1941	Hải Hưng province	—	Kinh	Male	
Tráng A Pao	Alternate	Reelected	1945	—	Lào Cai province	Economics	Hmong	Male	
Trần Văn Phác	Old	Not	1926	—	Hưng Yên province	—	Kinh	Male	
Nguyễn Hà Phan	Promoted	Reelected	1933	—	Bến Tre province	—	Kinh	Male	
Nguyễn Thanh Quất	New	Not	1928	1946	Hà Bắc province	—	Kinh	Male	
Hoàng Quy	Old	Not	1926	—	Hưng Yên province	—	Kinh	Male	
Nguyễn Quyết	Old	Not	1922	1940	Hưng Yên province	—	Kinh	Male	
Trần Quyết	Old	Not	1922	1943	Hà Nam province	—	Kinh	Male	
Nguyễn Đình Sở	New	Reelected	1929	1948	Hà Nội City	Economics	Kinh	Male	
Hoàng Bích Sơn	New	Not	1926	—	Đà Nẵng City	International relations	Kinh	Male	
Nguyễn Văn Sỹ	Old	Reelected	1930	—	Gia Lai province	Medicine	Ra-glai	Male	
Nguyễn Đức Tâm	Old	Not	1920	1944	Thái Bình province	—	Kinh	Male	
Trần Trọng Tân	New	Not	1926	1946	Quảng Trị province	—	Kinh	Male	
Trần Tấn	Alternate	Not	1927	1945	Hà Nội City	—	Kinh	Male	
Nguyễn Công Tạn	New	Reelected	1935	—	Thái Bình province	Agricultural science	Kinh	Male	
Phan Minh Tánh	Old	Reelected	1929	—	Minh Hải province	—	Kinh	Male	
Nguyễn Cơ Thạch	Old	Not	1921	1943	Nam Định province	—	Kinh	Male	
Nguyễn Thị Thân	New	Reelected	1937	—	Hà Tây province	Mechanical engineering	Kinh	Female	
La Thăng	Old	Not	1922	—	Lạng Sơn province	—	Kinh	Male	
Hoàng Minh Thắng	New	Not	1927	—	Đà Nẵng City	—	Kinh	Male	
Vũ Thắng	Old	Reelected	1926	—	Thừa Thiên Huế province	—	Kinh	Male	
Đỗ Quang Thắng	New	Reelected	1927	1946	Quảng Ngãi province	—	Kinh	Male	
Võ Viết Thanh	New	Not	1943	1959	Bến Tre province	Police science	Kinh	Male	
Đoàn Duy Thành	Old	Not	1929	1946	Hải Dương province	—	Kinh	Male	
Lê Quang Thành	New	Not	1924	1946	Mỹ Tho province	—	Kinh	Male	
Lâm Văn Thê	Old	Not	1922	1945	Bạc Liêu province	—	Kinh	Male	
Đặng Thí	Old	Not	1921	1938	Quảng Trị province	—	Kinh	Male	
Mai Chí Thọ	Old	Not	1922	1939	Nam Định province	—	Kinh	Male	
Lê Phước Thọ	New	Reelected	1927	1949	Minh Hải province	—	Kinh	Male	
Nguyễn Quốc Thước	New	Not	1926	1947	Nghệ An province	Military science	Kinh	Male	
Nguyễn Trung Tín	New	Reelected	1924	1946	Bình Định province	—	Kinh	Male	
Lê Văn Triết	Alternate	Reelected	1930	—	Tiền Giang province	—	Kinh	Male	
Nguyễn Tấn Trịnh	Old	Reelected	1936	—	Quảng Nam province	Fisheries science	Kinh	Male	
Nguyễn Ngọc Trìu	Old	Not	1926	1946	Thái Bình province	Political theory	Kinh	Male	
Đàm Quang Trung	Old	Not	1921	1939	Cao Bằng province	Military science	Tày	Male	
Nguyễn Văn Tư	Promoted	Reelected	1949	—	Khánh Hòa province	—	Kinh	Male	
Nguyễn Đình Tứ	Old	Reelected	1932	—	Nghệ Tĩnh province	Mathematics & physics	Kinh	Male	
Đào Duy Tùng	Old	Reelected	1924	1945	Phúc Yên City	—	Kinh	Male	
Phan Ngọc Tường	Alternate	Reelected	1929	—	Bình Trị Thiên	Mechanical engineering	Kinh	Male	
Vương Dương Tường	Old	Not	1926	—	Cao Bằng province	—	Kinh	Male	
Nguyễn Ký Ức	New	Not	1931	—	Vĩnh Long province	—	Kinh	Male	
Đoàn Thanh Vỵ	Alternate	Not					Kinh	Male	
Đậu Ngọc Xuân	New	Reelected	1927	1946	Hà Tĩnh province	Russian literature & Marxism–Leninism	Kinh	Male	
Lê Danh Xương	New	Reelected					Kinh	Male	
Nguyễn Trọng Xuyên	New	Reelected	1926	1946	Hưng Yên province	Military science	Kinh	Male	

=== Alternates ===
Alternates of the 6th Central Committee of the Communist Party of Vietnam
Name	5th CC	7th CC	BY	PM	Birthplace	Education	Ethnicity	Gender	Ref.
Đỗ Văn Ân	New	Member	1937	—	Hà Nam province	—	Kinh	Male	
Nguyễn Bá	New	Member	1939	—	Nghệ An province	Finance	Kinh	Male	
Phạm Văn Bính	New	Not					Kinh	Male	
Vũ Trọng Cảnh	New	Not	1929	—	Nam Định province	—	Kinh	Male	
Trần Quang Cơ	New	Member	1927	1947	Nam Định province	—	Kinh	Male	
Nguyễn Nhiêu Cốc	New	Promoted	1930	—	Hòa Bình province	Planning	Mường	Male	
Phạm Như Cương	New	Not	1928	—	Nghệ An province	Philosophy	Kinh	Male	
Hà Đăng	New	Member	1929	—	Phú Yên province	—	Kinh	Male	
Phan Xuân Đợt	Alternate	Not					Kinh	Male	
Nguyễn Tấn Dũng	New	Member	1949	1967	Cà Mau province	Law	Kinh	Male	
Trần Thị Đường	Alternate	Member	1939	—	Culture and technology	Hà Tĩnh province	Kinh	Female	
Nguyễn Bình Giang	New	Member	1940	—	Hà Nam province	Machine building engineering	Kinh	Male	
Phạm Minh Hạc	New	Member	1935	—	Hà Nội City	Literature & psychology	Kinh	Male	
Trương Mỹ Hoa	New	Promoted	1945	—	Tiền Giang province	Economics & the arts	Kinh	Female	
Nguyễn Hoà	Alternate	Not	1927	1946	Hưng Yên province	Military science	Kinh	Male	
Nguyễn Thế Hữu	New	Not	1927	1949	Tiền Giang province	—	Kinh	Male	
Cao Sỹ Kiêm	New	Member	1941	1963	Thái Bình province	Economics	Kinh	Male	
Đặng Xuân Kỳ	New	Promoted	1931	—	Nam Định province	Philosophy	Kinh	Male	
Nguyễn Xuân Kỷ	New	Member					Kinh	Male	
Đinh Văn Lạp	Alternate	Not					Kinh	Male	
Ngô Xuân Lộc	New	Member	1940	1963	Nam Định province	—	Kinh	Male	
Nguyễn Duy Luân	New	Member	1928	1947	Tuy Hòa City	—	Kinh	Male	
Trần Lum	New	Member					Kinh	Male	
Nông Đức Mạnh	New	Promoted	1940	1963	Bắc Kạn Province	Economics & carpentry	Tày	Male	
Nguyễn Thị Minh	New	Member	1944	—	Tây Ninh province	None	Kinh	Female	
Nguyễn Thị Xuân Mỹ	New	Member	1940	—	Hải Dương province	Law & economics	Kinh	Female	
Hoàng Đức Nghi	New	Member	1940	—	Cao Bằng province	Mechanical engineering	Tày	Male	
Lê Huy Ngọ	New	Promoted	1938	—	Thanh Hoá province	Agricultural engineering	Kinh	Male	
Nguyễn Trọng Nhân	New	Member	1930	—	Hà Nam province	Medicine	Kinh	Male	
Nguyễn Hà Phan	New	Promoted	1933	—	Bến Tre province	—	Kinh	Male	
Lâm Phú	New	Not	1939	—	Trà Vinh province	—	Khmer Krom	Male	
Ama Pui	New	Member	1932	—	Đắk Lắk province	—	Êđê	Male	
Lò Văn Puốn	New	Member	1940	—	Lai Châu province	Economic Management	Thái	Male	
Trần Hồng Quân	New	Member	1937	—	Sóc Trăng province	Mechanical Engineering	Kinh	Male	
Đỗ Quốc Sam	New	Member	1929	—	Hà Nội City	Civil engineering	Kinh	Male	
Lê Tài	New	Not	1928	—	Nghệ Tĩnh province	—	Kinh	Male	
Nguyễn Thị Tâm	New	Member	1956	—	Vĩnh Phú province	—	Kinh	Female	
Đặng Văn Thân	New	Member	1932	—	Bến Tre province	Mechanical engineering	Kinh	Male	
Phan Thu	New	Member	1931	—	Hà Tây province	—	Kinh	Male	
Phan Văn Tiệm	New	Member	1933	—	Hà Tĩnh province	Economics	Kinh	Male	
Hà Học Trạc	New	Member	1930	—	Hà Tĩnh province	Electrical Systems	Kinh	Male	
Nguyễn Đức Triều	New	Member	1942	—	Thái Bình province	Economics	Kinh	Male	
Trương Vĩnh Trọng	New	Member	1942	—	Bến Tre province	Literature & economic management	Kinh	Male	
Đỗ Quang Trung	New	Member	1946	—	Hà Nội City	—	Kinh	Male	
Hà Xuân Trường	Alternate	Not	1924	—	Hà Tĩnh province	—	Kinh	Male	
Nguyễn Văn Tư	New	Promoted	1949	—	Khánh Hòa province	—	Kinh	Male	
Lê Xuân Tùng	New	Member	1936	—	Hà Tĩnh province	Economics	Kinh	Male	
Nguyễn Thị Hồng Vân	New	Member	1944	—	Phú Khánh province	None	Kinh	Female	
Nguyễn Chí Vu	Alternate	Not					Kinh	Male	

== Bibliography ==
- Guan, Ang Cheng (2002). "Vietnam: Another Milestone and the Country Plods On". Southeast Asian Affairs. 2002. ISEAS–Yusof Ishak Institute: 345–356. JSTOR 27913216.
- Hung, Nguyen Manh (2000). "Vietnam in 1999: The Party's Choice". Asian Survey. 40 (1). University of California Press: 98–111. doi:10.2307/3021225. JSTOR 3021225.
- Vasavakul, Thaveeporn (1998). "Vietnam's One-Party Rule and Socialist Democracy?". Southeast Asian Affairs. ISEAS–Yusof Ishak Institute: 309–327. JSTOR 27912210.
- Thayer, Carlyle (2001). "Vietnam in 2000: Toward the Ninth Party Congress". Asian Survey. 41 (1). University of California Press: 81–89. doi:10.1525/as.2001.41.1.181. JSTOR 10.1525/as.2001.41.1.181.
