= 7th Central Committee of the Communist Party of Vietnam =

Central Committee of the Communist Party of Vietnam

7th Central Committee
- Symbol of the Communist Party of Vietnam

27 June 1991 – 1 July 1996 (5 years, 4 days) Overview
- Type: Central Committee of the Communist Party of Vietnam
- Election: 7th National Congress

Leadership
- General Secretary: Đỗ Mười
- Politburo: 13 members
- Secretariat: 9 members

Members
- Total: 146 members

The 7th Central Committee of the Communist Party of Vietnam (CPV) was elected at the 7th CPV National Congress. It elected the 7th Politburo and the 7th Secretariat.

== Plenums ==
The Central Committee (CC) is not a permanent institution. Instead, it convenes plenary sessions between party congresses. When the CC is not in session, decision-making powers are delegated to its internal bodies; that is, the Politburo and the Secretariat. None of these organs are permanent bodies either; typically, they convene several times a month.

Plenary Sessions of the 7th Central Committee
Plenum	Date	Length	Ref.
1st Plenary Session	26 June 1991	1 day	
2nd Plenary Session	25 November – 4 December 1991	10 days	
3rd Plenary Session	18–29 June 1992	12 days	
4th Plenary Session	4–14 January 1993	11 days	
5th Plenary Session	3–10 June 1993	8 days	
6th Plenary Session	24 November – 1 December 1993	9 days	
Extraordinary Plenary Session	20–25 January 1994	6 days	
7th Plenary Session	25–30 July 1994	6 days	
8th Plenary Session	16–23 January 1995	8 days	
9th Plenary Session	6–14 November 1995	9 days	
10th Plenary Session	12–20 April 1996	9 days	
11th Plenary Session	3–9 June 1996	7 days	
12th Plenary Session	19–20 June 1996	2 days	

== Composition ==
Members of the 7th Central Committee of the Communist Party of Vietnam
Name	6th CC	8th CC	BY	PM	Birthplace	Education	Ethnicity	Gender	Ref.
Nguyễn Văn An	Old	Reelected	1937	1959	Nam Định province	Electrical engineering	Kinh	Male	
Đỗ Văn Ân	Alternate	Reelected	1937	—	Hà Nam province	—	Kinh	Male	
Lê Đức Anh	Old	Reelected	1920	1938	Thừa Thiên Huế province	None	Kinh	Male	
Nguyễn Bá	Alternate	Reelected	1939	—	Nghệ An province	Finance	Kinh	Male	
Lê Đức Bình	Old	Not	1930	—	Ninh Bình province	None	Kinh	Male	
Nguyễn Đức Bình	Old	Reelected	1927	1945	Hà Tĩnh province	Philosophy	Kinh	Male	
Nguyễn Thới Bưng	Old	Not	1927	—	Tây Ninh province	None	Kinh	Male	
Nguyễn Mạnh Cầm	Old	Reelected	1929	—	Nghệ An province	Russian studies	Kinh	Male	
Nguyễn Kỳ Cẩm	Old	Not	1929	—	Nghệ Tĩnh province	—	Kinh	Male	
Huỳnh Văn Cần	Old	Not					Kinh	Male	
Nguyễn Văn Chi	Old	Reelected	1945	1965	Đà Nẵng City	Economic Management	Kinh	Male	
Võ Trần Chí	Old	Not	1927	1946	Long An province	None	Kinh	Male	
Nguyễn Văn Chiểu	New	Not	1930	1947	—	—	Kinh	Male	
Đỗ Chính	Old	Not	1926	1946	Hưng Yên province	None	Kinh	Male	
Nguyễn Văn Chính	Old	Not	1924	1946	Hồ Chí Minh City	None	Kinh	Male	
Nguyễn Chơn	Old	Not	1927	1949	Đà Nẵng City	Military science	Kinh	Male	
Đặng Vũ Chư	New	Reelected	1940	—	Nam Định province	—	Kinh	Male	
Trần Quang Cơ	Alternate	Not	1927	1947	Nam Định province	—	Kinh	Male	
Nguyễn Nhiêu Cốc	Old	Not	1930	—	Hòa Bình province	Planning	Mường	Male	
Vũ Đình Cự	New	Reelected	1936	—	Thái Bình province	Physics	Kinh	Male	
Huỳnh Cương	New	Not	1925	1967	Sóc Trăng province	—	Khmer	Male	
Võ Văn Cương	New	Reelected	1942	—	Tây Ninh Province	Economics & political science	Kinh	Male	
Hà Đăng	Alternate	Not	1929	—	Phú Yên province	—	Kinh	Male	
Trần Văn Đăng	New	Reelected	1933	—	Phú Thọ province	Engineering economics	Kinh	Male	
Lê Thanh Đạo	New	Not	1944	—	Hà Nội City	—	Kinh	Male	
Nguyễn Đệ	New	Not	1928	1945	Nghệ An province	—	Kinh	Male	
Phan Diễn	New	Reelected	1937	1962	Quảng Nam province	—	Kinh	Male	
Lư Văn Điền	New	Reelected	1938	—	Cần Thơ province	None	Kinh	Male	
Nguyễn Cảnh Dinh	Old	Reelected	1934	—	Nghệ An province	Irrigation	Kinh	Male	
Hà Quang Dự	New	Reelected	1945	—	Tuyên Quang province	Agricultural engineering	Tày	Male	
Nguyễn Tấn Dũng	Alternate	Reelected	1949	1967	Cà Mau province	Law	Kinh	Male	
Trương Quang Được	New	Reelected	1940	—	Quảng Nam province	Mechanical engineering & economics	Kinh	Male	
Đỗ Bình Dương	New	Reelected	1942	—	Bắc Giang province	—	Kinh	Male	
Trần Thị Đường	Alternate	Not	1939	—	Culture and technology	Hà Tĩnh province	Kinh	Female	
Phạm Thế Duyệt	Old	Reelected	1936	1965	Hải Dương province	Mining engineering & economic management	Kinh	Male	
Lê Văn Dỹ	Old	Reelected	1934	1960	Long An province	Chemistry	Kinh	Male	
Nguyễn Bình Giang	Alternate	Reelected	1940	—	Hà Nam province	Machine building engineering	Kinh	Male	
Hồng Hà	Old	Not	1928	1947	Nam Định province	—	Kinh	Male	
Phạm Minh Hạc	Alternate	Reelected	1935	—	Hà Nội City	Literature & psychology	Kinh	Male	
Nguyễn Ngô Hai	New	Reelected	1941	1965	Nghệ An province	—	Kinh	Male	
Vũ Ngọc Hải	Old	Not	1931	—	Bình Trị Thiên	Electrical engineering	Kinh	Male	
Nguyễn Thị Hằng	Old	Reelected	1944	—	Hải Phòng City	Economics	Kinh	Female	
Cù Thị Hậu	Old	Reelected	1944	—	Phú Thọ province	—	Kinh	Female	
Nguyễn Văn Hiệu	Old	Reelected	1938	—	Hà Tây province	Physics	Kinh	Male	
Trương Mỹ Hoa	Old	Reelected	1945	—	Tiền Giang province	Economics & the arts	Kinh	Female	
Nguyễn Đức Hoan	New	Reelected	1938	—	Quảng Trị province	Agricultural engineering	Kinh	Male	
Trần Đình Hoan	New	Reelected	1939	1962	Hưng Yên province	Labour economics	Kinh	Male	
Trần Hoàn	Old	Not	1928	1948	Quảng Trị province	—	Kinh	Male	
Vũ Tuyên Hoàng	Old	Reelected	1938	—	Hà Nội City	Agricultural science	Kinh	Male	
Đặng Thành Học	New	Reelected	1938	—	Minh Hải province	—	Kinh	Male	
Nguyễn Văn Hơn	Old	Not	1929	1946	An Giang province	—	Kinh	Male	
Nguyễn Thị Kim Hồng	New	Reelected	1955	—	Tiền Giang province	—	Kinh	Female	
Vũ Quốc Hùng	New	Reelected	1940	—	Hà Nội City	—	Kinh	Male	
Phạm Hưng	Old	Not	1927	1946	Hải Hưng province	—	Kinh	Male	
Lê Minh Hương	New	Reelected	1936	—	Hà Tĩnh province	Military science	Kinh	Male	
Nguyễn Đình Hương	Old	Not	1930	1948	Nghệ An province	—	Kinh	Male	
Đặng Hữu	Old	Reelected	1930	—	Bình Định province	Transportation engineering	Kinh	Male	
Bùi Quang Huy	New	Reelected	1941	—	Vĩnh Long	—	Kinh	Male	
Phạm Văn Hy	Old	Not	1931	—	Nam Hà province	—	Kinh	Male	
Phan Văn Khải	Old	Reelected	1933	1959	Hồ Chí Minh City	Economics	Kinh	Male	
Nguyễn Khánh	Old	Not	1928	—	Hà Tây province	Philosophy	Kinh	Male	
Nguyễn Nam Khánh	Old	Not	1927	1946	Bình Định province	—	Kinh	Male	
Hà Thị Khiết	New	Reelected	1950	1969	Tuyên Quang province	Political science	Tày	Female	
Vũ Khoan	New	Reelected	1937	—	Hà Tây province	Russian studies	Kinh	Male	
Đoàn Khuê	Old	Reelected	1923	—	Quảng Trị province	Military science	Kinh	Male	
Cao Sỹ Kiêm	Alternate	Reelected	1941	1963	Thái Bình province	Economics	Kinh	Male	
Lê Văn Kiến	Old	Not	1926	—	Long An province	—	Kinh	Male	
Võ Văn Kiệt	Old	Reelected	1922	1939	Vĩnh Long province	None	Kinh	Male	
Đặng Xuân Kỳ	New	Not	1931	—	Nam Định province	Philosophy	Kinh	Male	
Nguyễn Xuân Kỷ	Alternate	Not					Kinh	Male	
Mai Thúc Lân	New	Reelected	1935	—	Quảng Nam province	Agricultural engineering	Kinh	Male	
Trịnh Văn Lâu	Old	Not	1929	—	Cửu Long Province	—	Kinh	Male	
Đào Trọng Lịch	New	Reelected	1939	1960	Vĩnh Phúc province	Military science	Kinh	Male	
Ngô Xuân Lộc	Alternate	Reelected	1940	1963	Nam Định province	—	Kinh	Male	
Phạm Tâm Long	Old	Not	1928	1946	Hà Tây province	Military science	Kinh	Male	
Nguyễn Duy Luân	Alternate	Not	1928	1947	Tuy Hòa City	—	Kinh	Male	
Trần Lum	Alternate	Not					Kinh	Male	
Trần Đức Lương	Old	Reelected	1937	1961	Quảng Ngãi province	Geological engineering	Kinh	Male	
Bùi Danh Lưu	Old	Reelected	1935	—	Phú Thọ province	Transportation engineering	Kinh	Male	
Đào Đình Luyện	Old	Not	1929	1945	Thái Bình province	Military science	Kinh	Male	
Lê Mai	New	Not	1940	—	Huế City	Foreign languages	Kinh	Male	
Nông Đức Mạnh	Alternate	Reelected	1940	1963	Bắc Kạn Province	Economics & carpentry	Tày	Male	
Vũ Mão	Old	Reelected	1939	—	Nam Định province	Agricultural engineering & economics	Kinh	Male	
Nguyễn Thị Minh	Alternate	Reelected	1944	—	Tây Ninh province	None	Kinh	Female	
Đỗ Mười	Old	Reelected	1917	1939	Hà Nội City	None	Kinh	Male	
Nguyễn Thị Xuân Mỹ	Alternate	Reelected	1940	—	Hải Dương province	Law & economics	Kinh	Female	
Thái Phụng Nê	New	Reelected	1936	—	Phú Yên province	Hydropower engineering	Kinh	Male	
Phạm Thanh Ngân	New	Reelected	1939	1961	Thái Nguyên province	Military science	Kinh	Male	
Hoàng Đức Nghi	Alternate	Reelected	1940	—	Cao Bằng province	Mechanical engineering	Tày	Male	
Hoàng Văn Nghiên	New	Reelected	1941	—	Nam Định province	Electronics	Kinh	Male	
Lê Huy Ngọ	Old	Reelected	1938	—	Thanh Hoá province	Agricultural engineering	Kinh	Male	
Bùi Thiện Ngộ	Old	Not	1929	1947	Đồng Nai province	—	Kinh	Male	
Đàm Văn Ngụy	Old	Not	1927	1945	Cao Bằng province	—	Kinh	Male	
Lê Thanh Nhàn	Old	Not	1932	—	Cửu Long Province	—	Kinh	Male	
Nguyễn Trọng Nhân	Alternate	Not	1930	—	Hà Nam province	Medicine	Kinh	Male	
Võ Hồng Nhân	New	Reelected	1944	—	Sa Đéc province	—	Kinh	Male	
Thái Bá Nhiệm	New	Not	1929	1949	Quảng Bình province	—	Kinh	Male	
Huỳnh Văn Niềm	Old	Not	1931	1949	—	—	Kinh	Male	
Nguyễn Niệm	Old	Not	1927	1945	Nghệ Tĩnh province	—	Kinh	Male	
Nguyễn Dy Niên	New	Reelected	1935	—	Thanh Hoá province	Arts	Kinh	Male	
Nguyễn Thái Ninh	New	Not					Kinh	Male	
Vũ Oanh	Old	Not	1924	1941	Hải Hưng province	—	Kinh	Male	
Tráng A Pao	Old	Reelected	1945	—	Lào Cai province	Economics	Hmong	Male	
Nguyễn Hà Phan	Old	Not	1933	—	Bến Tre province	—	Kinh	Male	
Lê Khả Phiêu	New	Reelected	1931	1949	Thanh Hóa province	None	Kinh	Male	
Đỗ Phượng	New	Not	1930	1947	Hải Phòng City	—	Kinh	Male	
Ama Pui	Alternate	Not	1932	—	Đắk Lắk province	—	Êđê	Male	
Lò Văn Puốn	Alternate	Reelected	1940	—	Lai Châu province	Economic Management	Thái	Male	
Trần Hồng Quân	Alternate	Reelected	1937	—	Sóc Trăng province	Mechanical Engineering	Kinh	Male	
Nguyễn Duy Quý	New	Reelected	1932	—	Nghệ An province	Philosophy	Kinh	Male	
Chu Văn Rỵ	New	Reelected					Kinh	Male	
Đỗ Quốc Sam	Alternate	Not	1929	—	Hà Nội City	Civil engineering	Kinh	Male	
Trương Tấn Sang	New	Reelected	1949	1969	Long An province	Law	Kinh	Male	
Nguyễn Đình Sở	Old	Not	1929	1948	Hà Nội City	Economics	Kinh	Male	
Bùi Xuân Sơn	New	Reelected	—	—	—	—	Kinh	Male	
Phạm Song	New	Not	1931	1950	Hà Tĩnh province	Cardiology	Kinh	Male	
Nguyễn Văn Sỹ	Old	Not	1930	—	Gia Lai province	Medicine	Ra-glai	Male	
Nguyễn Thị Tâm	Alternate	Not	1956	—	Vĩnh Phú province	—	Kinh	Female	
Trần Trọng Tân	New	Not	1926	1949	Quảng Trị province	—	Kinh	Male	
Nguyễn Công Tạn	Old	Reelected	1935	—	Thái Bình province	Agricultural science	Kinh	Male	
Sô Lây Tăng	New	Reelected	1937	—	Kon Tum province	Medicine	Dẻ-Triêng	Male	
Hoàng Tanh	New	Reelected					Kinh	Male	
Phan Minh Tánh	Old	Not	1929	—	Minh Hải province	—	Kinh	Male	
Nông Hồng Thái	New	Reelected	1939	—	Cao Bằng province	Agronomy	Tày	Male	
Đặng Văn Thân	Alternate	Not	1932	—	Bến Tre province	Mechanical engineering	Kinh	Male	
Nguyễn Thị Thân	Old	Not	1937	—	Hà Tây province	Mechanical engineering	Kinh	Female	
Trương Công Thận	New	Reelected	1942	—	An Giang province	None	Kinh	Male	
Đỗ Quang Thắng	Old	Not	1927	1946	Quảng Ngãi province	—	Kinh	Male	
Vũ Thắng	Old	Not	1926	—	Thừa Thiên Huế province	—	Kinh	Male	
Tạ Hữu Thanh	New	Reelected	1942	—	Phú Thọ province	Banking	Kinh	Male	
Trần Thị Thanh Thanh	New	Reelected	1940	—	Đà Nẵng City	Pedagogy	Kinh	Female	
Hữu Thọ	New	Not	1932	1946	Hà Nội City	Journalism	Kinh	Male	
Lê Phước Thọ	Old	Not	1927	1949	Minh Hải province	—	Kinh	Male	
Phạm Văn Thọ	New	Reelected	1945	—	Hải Dương province	—	Kinh	Male	
Phan Thu	Alternate	Not	1931	—	Hà Tây province	—	Kinh	Male	
Hoàng Thừa	New	Reelected	1937	—	Hà Giang province	Economics	Tày	Male	
Đặng Quân Thụy	New	Not	1928	1947	Nam Định province	Military science	Kinh	Male	
Phan Văn Tiệm	Alternate	Not	1933	—	Hà Tĩnh province	Economics	Kinh	Male	
Nguyễn Trung Tín	Old	Not	1924	1946	Bình Định province	—	Kinh	Male	
Tô Xuân Toàn	New	Reelected	1937	—	Ninh Bình province	Agricultural science	Kinh	Male	
Phạm Văn Trà	New	Reelected	1935	—	Bắc Ninh province	Military science	Kinh	Male	
Hà Học Trạc	Alternate	Not	1930	—	Hà Tĩnh province	Electrical Systems	Kinh	Male	
Hà Mạnh Trí	New	Reelected	1942	—	Thái Bình province	Law	Kinh	Male	
Nguyễn Thế Trị	New	Reelected	1940	—	Hải Dương province	—	Kinh	Male	
Lê Văn Triết	Old	Not	1930	—	Tiền Giang province	—	Kinh	Male	
Nguyễn Minh Triết	New	Reelected	1942	1965	Bình Dương province	Mathematics & political science	Kinh	Male	
Nguyễn Đức Triều	Alternate	Reelected	1942	—	Thái Bình province	Economics	Kinh	Male	
Lê Xuân Trinh	New	Not	1933	—	Quảng Nam province	—	Kinh	Male	
Nguyễn Tấn Trịnh	Old	Reelected	1936	—	Quảng Nam province	Fisheries science	Kinh	Male	
Nguyễn Phú Trọng	New	Reelected	1944	1968	Hà Nội City	Political science & philology	Kinh	Male	
Trương Vĩnh Trọng	Alternate	Reelected	1942	—	Bến Tre province	Literature & economic management	Kinh	Male	
Đinh Trung	New	Reelected					Kinh	Male	
Đỗ Quang Trung	Alternate	Reelected	1946	—	Hà Nội City	—	Kinh	Male	
Lê Văn Tu	New	Reelected	1936	—	Thanh Hoá province	Metallurgical Engineering	Kinh	Male	
Nguyễn Văn Tư	Old	Reelected	1949	—	Khánh Hòa province	—	Kinh	Male	
Nguyễn Đình Tứ	Old	Reelected	1932	—	Nghệ Tĩnh province	Mathematics & physics	Kinh	Male	
Đào Duy Tùng	Old	Not	1924	1945	Phúc Yên City	—	Kinh	Male	
Lê Xuân Tùng	Alternate	Reelected	1936	—	Hà Tĩnh province	Economics	Kinh	Male	
Phan Ngọc Tường	Old	Not	1929	—	Bình Trị Thiên	Mechanical engineering	Kinh	Male	
Bùi Thanh Vân	New	Not	1928	1945	—	—	Kinh	Male	
Nguyễn Thị Hồng Vân	Alternate	Reelected	1944	—	Phú Khánh province	None	Kinh	Female	
Hồ Đức Việt	New	Reelected	1947	1967	Nghệ An province	Mathematics & physics	Kinh	Male	
Trần Văn Vụ	New	Reelected					Kinh	Male	
Đậu Ngọc Xuân	Old	Not	1927	1946	Hà Tĩnh province	Russian literature & Marxism–Leninism	Kinh	Male	
Lê Danh Xương	Old	Reelected					Kinh	Male	
Nguyễn Trọng Xuyên	Old	Not	1926	1946	Hưng Yên province	Military science	Kinh	Male	

== Bibliography ==
- Guan, Ang Cheng (2002). "Vietnam: Another Milestone and the Country Plods On". Southeast Asian Affairs. 2002. ISEAS–Yusof Ishak Institute: 345–356. JSTOR 27913216.
- Hung, Nguyen Manh (2000). "Vietnam in 1999: The Party's Choice". Asian Survey. 40 (1). University of California Press: 98–111. doi:10.2307/3021225. JSTOR 3021225.
- Vasavakul, Thaveeporn (1998). "Vietnam's One-Party Rule and Socialist Democracy?". Southeast Asian Affairs. ISEAS–Yusof Ishak Institute: 309–327. JSTOR 27912210.
- Thayer, Carlyle (2001). "Vietnam in 2000: Toward the Ninth Party Congress". Asian Survey. 41 (1). University of California Press: 81–89. doi:10.1525/as.2001.41.1.181. JSTOR 10.1525/as.2001.41.1.181.
