= 5th Central Committee of the Communist Party of Vietnam =

Central Committee of the Communist Party of Vietnam

5th Central Committee
- Symbol of the Communist Party of Vietnam

31 March 1982 – 18 December 1986 (4 years, 262 days) Overview
- Type: Central Committee of the Communist Party of Vietnam
- Election: 5th National Congress

Leadership
- General Secretary: Lê Duẩn (March 1982-July 1986); Trường Chinh (July 1986-December 1986)
- Politburo: Members: 13; Alternates: 2
- Secretariat: 10 members

Members
- Total: 116

Alternates
- Total: 36 alternates

The 5th Central Committee of the Communist Party of Vietnam (CPV) was elected at the 5th CPV National Congress. It elected the 5th Politburo and the 5th Secretariat.

== Plenums ==
The Central Committee (CC) is not a permanent institution. Instead, it convenes plenary sessions between party congresses. When the CC is not in session, decision-making powers are delegated to its internal bodies; that is, the Politburo and the Secretariat. None of these organs are permanent bodies either; typically, they convene several times a month.

Plenary Sessions of the 5th Central Committee
Plenum	Date	Length	Ref.
1st Plenary Session	31 March 1982	1 day	
2nd Plenary Session	7 March 1982	1 day	
3rd Plenary Session	3–10 December 1982	8 days	
4th Plenary Session	18–24 June 1983	7 days	
5th Plenary Session	29 November 1983	1 day	
6th Plenary Session	3 July 1984	1 day	
7th Plenary Session	11–17 December 1984	7 days	
8th Plenary Session	10 June 1985	1 day	
9th Plenary Session	12 March 1985	1 day	
10th Plenary Session	Late May – 5/6 June 1986	Not made public.	
11th Plenary Session	14 December 1986	1 day	
12th Plenary Session	17 November 1986	1 day	

== Composition ==
=== Members ===
Members of the 5th Central Committee of the Communist Party of Vietnam
Rank	Name	4th CC	6th CC	BY	PM	Birthplace	Education	Ethnicity	Gender	Ref.
1	Lê Duẩn	Old	Not	1907	1930	Quảng Trị Province	—	Kinh	Male	
2	Trường Chinh	Old	Not	1907	1930	Nam Định province	—	Kinh	Male	
3	Phạm Văn Đồng	Old	Not	1906	1930	Quảng Ngãi province	—	Kinh	Male	
4	Phạm Hùng	Old	Reelected	1912	1930	Vĩnh Long province	—	Kinh	Male	
5	Lê Đức Thọ	Old	Not	1911	1930	Nam Định province	—	Kinh	Male	
6	Võ Nguyên Giáp	Old	Reelected	1911	1930	Quảng Bình province	—	Kinh	Male	
7	Nguyễn Duy Trinh	Old	Not	1910	1930	Nghệ An province	—	Kinh	Male	
8	Lê Thanh Nghị	Old	Not	1911	1930	Hải Dương province	—	Kinh	Male	
9	Trần Quốc Hoàn	Old	Not	1916	1934	Nghệ An province	—	Kinh	Male	
10	Văn Tiến Dũng	Old	Reelected	1917	1937	Hà Nội City	—	Kinh	Male	
11	Nguyễn Văn Linh	Old	Reelected	1915	1936	Hưng Yên province	—	Kinh	Male	
12	Lê Văn Lương	Old	Not	1912	1930	Bắc Ninh province	—	Kinh	Male	
13	Chu Huy Mân	Old	Not	1913	1930	Nghệ An province	Military science	Kinh	Male	
14	Võ Chí Công	Old	Reelected	1912	1935	Đà Nẵng City	—	Kinh	Male	
15	Tố Hữu	Old	Not	1920	1938	Thừa Thiên Huế province	—	Kinh	Male	
16	Võ Văn Kiệt	Old	Reelected	1922	1939	Vĩnh Long province	—	Kinh	Male	
17	Đỗ Mười	Old	Reelected	1917	1939	Hà Nội City	—	Kinh	Male	
18	Nguyễn Thanh Bình	Old	Reelected	1918	1939	Bắc Ninh province	—	Kinh	Male	
19	Nguyễn Văn Chí	Old	Reelected	1945	1965	Đà Nẵng City	Economic Management	Kinh	Male	
20	Đỗ Chính	Alternate	Reelected	1926	1946	Hưng Yên province	—	Kinh	Male	
21	Cao Đăng Chiếm	Alternate	Reelected	1921	1946	Mỹ Tho province	—	Kinh	Male	
22	Nguyễn Côn	Old	Not	1916	1937	Nghệ An province	—	Kinh	Male	
23	Lê Quang Đạo	Old	Reelected	1921	1940	Bắc Ninh province	—	Kinh	Male	
24	Nguyễn Thị Định	Old	Reelected	1920	1938	Bến Tre province	—	Kinh	Female	
25	Trần Độ	Old	Reelected	1923	1940	Thái Bình province	—	Kinh	Male	
26	Trần Đông	Old	Reelected	1925	1946	Hải Phòng City	—	Kinh	Male	
27	Ngô Duy Đông	Old	Not	1917	1939	Thái Bình province	—	Kinh	Male	
28	La Lâm Gia	Old	Not	1919	1947	Bạc Liêu province	—	Kinh	Male	
29	Song Hào	Old	Not	1917	1939	Nam Định province	—	Kinh	Male	
30	Vũ Thị Hồng	Alternate	Reelected					Kinh	Female	
31	Lê Khắc	Alternate	Not	1916	1947	Hà Nội City	—	Kinh	Male	
32	Bùi Thanh Khiết	Alternate	Not	1924	—	Sa Đéc province	—	Kinh	Male	
33	Nguyễn Lam	Old	Not	1922	1943	Hà Nam province	—	Kinh	Male	
34	Trần Lâm	Alternate	Not	1911	—	Hà Nội City	—	Kinh	Male	
35	Trần Lê	Old	Not	1921	1943	Quảng Nam province	—	Kinh	Male	
36	Trần Văn Long	Old	Not					Kinh	Male	
37	Đồng Sĩ Nguyên	Old	Reelected	1923	1938	Quảng Bình province	Military science	Kinh	Male	
38	Nguyễn Thị Như	Old	Not	1928	—	Hà Nội City	—	Kinh	Female	
39	Đỗ Văn Nguyện	Old	Not	1927	—	Tây Ninh province	—	Kinh	Male	
40	Vũ Oanh	Alternate	Reelected	1924	1941	Hải Hưng province	—	Kinh	Male	
41	Trần Phương	Alternate	Not	1927	1946	Hưng Yên province	Economics	Kinh	Male	
42	Trần Quyết	Old	Reelected	1922	1943	Hà Nam province	—	Kinh	Male	
43	Trần Quỳnh	Old	Not	1920	1945	Quảng Trị province	—	Kinh	Male	
44	Trần Văn Sớm	Old	Not	1918	1936	Bạc Liêu province	—	Kinh	Male	
45	Nguyễn Đức Tâm	Old	Reelected	1920	1944	Thái Bình province	—	Kinh	Male	
46	Nguyễn Cơ Thạch	Old	Reelected	1921	1943	Nam Định province	—	Kinh	Male	
47	Đặng Thí	Old	Reelected	1921	1938	Quảng Trị province	—	Kinh	Male	
48	Nguyễn Hữu Thụ	Alternate	Not	1926	—	Hà Đông City	—	Kinh	Male	
49	Nguyễn Đức Thuận	Old	Not	1916	1937	Nam Hà province	—	Kinh	Male	
50	Đào Duy Tùng	Old	Reelected	1924	1945	Phúc Yên City	—	Kinh	Male	
51	Hoàng Tùng	Old	Not	1920	1943	Hà Nam province	—	Kinh	Male	
52	Nguyễn Đình Tứ	Alternate	Reelected	1932	—	Nghệ Tĩnh province	Mathematics & physics	Kinh	Male	
53	Nguyễn Ngọc Trìu	Old	Reelected	1926	1946	Thái Bình province	Political theory	Kinh	Male	
54	Nguyễn Vịnh	Old	Not					Kinh	Male	
55	Trần Xuân Bách	New	Reelected	1924	—	Nam Định province	—	Kinh	Male	
56	Nguyễn Đức Bình	New	Reelected	1927	1945	Hà Tĩnh province	Philosophy	Kinh	Male	
57	Lê Đức Bình	New	Reelected	1930	—	Ninh Bình province	—	Kinh	Male	
58	Nguyễn Thị Bình	New	Not	1927	1948	Sa Đéc province	Political theory	Kinh	Female	
59	Vũ Đại	New	Not	1927	1945	Hải Hưng province	—	Kinh	Male	
60	Trần Hữu Đắc	New	Reelected					Kinh	Male	
61	Nguyễn Hoà	New	Reelected	1927	1946	Hưng Yên province	Military science	Kinh	Male	
62	Đinh Nho Liêm	New	Reelected					Kinh	Male	
63	Vũ Mão	New	Reelected	1939	—	Nam Định province	Agricultural engineering & economics	Kinh	Male	
64	Bình Phương	New	Not					Kinh	Male	
65	Vũ Quang	New	Not	1926	—	Hà Nội City	—	Kinh	Male	
66	Lê Đức Thịnh	New	Not	1927	1945	Hưng Yên province	—	Kinh	Male	
67	Nguyễn Văn Chính	Alternate	Reelected	1924	1946	Hồ Chí Minh City	—	Kinh	Male	
68	Lê Quang Chữ	New	Not	1922	—	Quảng Bình province	—	Kinh	Male	
69	Y Ngông Niê Đăm	Alternate	Not	1922	—	Đắk Lắk province	Medicine	Kinh	Male	
70	Nguyễn Đáng	Alternate	Not	1925	1947	Trà Vinh province	—	Kinh	Male	
71	Lê Văn Hiền	Old	Not					Kinh	Male	
72	Trần Quốc Hương	Old	Reelected	1924	1943	Hà Nam province	—	Kinh	Male	
73	Nguyễn Xuân Hữu	Old	Reelected	1923	1946	Quảng Nam province	—	Kinh	Male	
74	Trần Kiên	Old	Reelected	1920	1945	Quảng Ngãi province	—	Kinh	Male	
75	Vũ Đình Liệu	Old	Not	1919	1946	Nam Định province	—	Kinh	Male	
76	Vũ Ngọc Linh	Old	Not	1920	1943	Bắc Ninh province	—	Kinh	Male	
77	Hoàng Trường Minh	Old	Reelected	1922	1945	Bắc Kạn province	Agricultural economics	Tày	Male	
78	Y Một	Alternate	Reelected	1939	1957	Kon Tum province	—	Giẻ Triêng	Female	
79	Hồ Nghinh	Alternate	Not	1915	1946	Quảng Nam province	—	Kinh	Male	
80	Lê Văn Phẩm	Old	Not	1922	—	Tiền Giang province	—	Kinh	Male	
81	Bùi San	Old	Not	1914	1930	Thừa Thiên Huế province	—	Tày	Male	
82	Nguyễn Văn Sỹ	Alternate	Reelected	1930	—	Gia Lai province	Medicine	Ra-glai	Male	
83	Bùi Qung Tạo	New	Not	1913	—	Thái Bình province	—	Kinh	Male	
84	Lê Việt Thắng	Old	Not					Kinh	Male	
85	Lê Phước Thọ	Alternate	Reelected	1927	1949	Cà Mau province	—	Kinh	Male	
86	Mai Chí Thọ	Old	Reelected	1922	1939	Nam Định province	—	Kinh	Male	
87	Trần Vỹ	Alternate	Not	1921	1945	Hưng Yên province	—	Kinh	Male	
88	Phạm Bái	New	Reelected	1922	—	Hải Phòng City	—	Kinh	Male	
89	Nguyễn Kỳ Cẩm	New	Reelected	1929	—	Nghệ Tĩnh province	—	Kinh	Male	
90	Nguyễn Văn Đức	New	Reelected	1923	—	Vĩnh Phú province	—	Kinh	Male	
91	Nguyễn Văn Hơn	New	Reelected	1929	1946	An Giang province	—	Kinh	Male	
92	Phạm Văn Hy	New	Reelected	1931	—	Nam Hà province	—	Kinh	Male	
93	Hoàng Nó	New	Not					Kinh	Male	
94	Hoàng Quy	New	Reelected	1926	—	Hưng Yên province	—	Kinh	Male	
95	Phan Minh Tánh	New	Reelected	1929	—	Minh Hải province	—	Kinh	Male	
96	La Thăng	New	Reelected	1922	—	Lạng Sơn province	—	Kinh	Male	
97	Võ Trung Thành	New	Not	1924	—	Quảng Ngãi province	—	Kinh	Male	
98	Vũ Thắng	New	Reelected	1926	—	Thừa Thiên Huế province	—	Kinh	Male	
99	Hoàng Minh Thắng	New	Reelected	1927	—	Đà Nẵng City	—	Kinh	Male	
100	Lâm Văn Thê	New	Reelected	1922	1945	Bạc Liêu province	—	Kinh	Male	
101	Vương Dương Tường	New	Reelected	1926	—	Cao Bằng province	—	Kinh	Male	
102	Lê Đức Anh	Old	Reelected	1920	1938	Thừa Thiên Huế province	—	Kinh	Male	
103	Lê Ngọc Hiền	Alternate	Reelected	1928	1945	Hà Đông City	—	Kinh	Male	
104	Hoàng Cầm	Old	Reelected	1920	1947	Hà Đông City	—	Kinh	Male	
105	Đặng Vũ Hiệp	Alternate	Not	1928	—	Hưng Yên province	—	Kinh	Male	
106	Đoàn Khuê	Old	Reelected	1923	—	Quảng Trị province	Military science	Kinh	Male	
107	Vũ Lập	Old	Reelected	1924	—	Cao Bằng province	—	Tày	Male	
108	Bùi Phùng	Old	Not	1920	1946	Bắc Ninh province	Military science	Kinh	Male	
109	Nguyễn Quyết	Old	Reelected	1922	1940	Hưng Yên province	—	Kinh	Male	
110	Lê Trọng Tấn	Old	Not	1914	1945	Hà Đông City	Military science	Kinh	Male	
111	Hoàng Văn Thái	Old	Not	1915	1938	Thái Bình province	Military science	Kinh	Male	
112	Đàm Quang Trung	Old	Reelected	1921	1939	Cao Bằng province	Military science	Tày	Male	
113	Nguyễn Thế Bôn	New	Not	1926	1948	Hải Phòng City	Military science	Kinh	Male	
114	Nguyễn Minh Châu	New	Reelected	1921	—	Tây Ninh province	—	Kinh	Male	
115	Nguyễn Nam Khánh	New	Reelected	1927	1946	Bình Định province	—	Kinh	Male	
116	Trần Văn Phác	New	Reelected	1926	—	Hưng Yên province	—	Kinh	Male	
—	Phan Văn Khải	Promoted	Reelected	1933	1959	Hồ Chí Minh City	Economics	Kinh	Male	
—	Phan Thanh Liêm	Promoted	Reelected	1933	—	Thừa Thiên Huế province	Mechanical engineering	Kinh	Male	
—	Nguyễn Thị Ngọc Liên	Promoted	Reelected	1943	—	Bình Dương province	—	Kinh	Female	
—	Đoàn Duy Thành	Promoted	Reelected	1929	1946	Hải Dương province	—	Kinh	Male	
—	Nguyến Tấn Trịnh	Promoted	Reelected	1936	—	Quảng Nam province	Fisheries science	Kinh	Male	

=== Alternates ===
Alternates of the 5th Central Committee of the Communist Party of Vietnam
Rank	Name	4th CC	6th CC	BY	PM	Birthplace	Education	Ethnicity	Gender	Ref.
1	Nguyễn Chân	Alternate	Not	1929	—	Bắc Ninh province	—	Kinh	Male	
2	Nguyễn Cảnh Dinh	New	Member	1934	—	Nghệ An province	Irrigation	Kinh	Male	
3	Lê Văn Dỹ	New	Member	1934	1960	Long An province	Chemistry	Kinh	Male	
4	Phan Xuân Đợt	New	Alternate	1934	—	Bến Tre province	—	Kinh	Male	
5	Hồng Hà	New	Member	1928	1947	Nam Định province	—	Kinh	Male	
6	Nguyễn Văn Hiệu	New	Member	1938	—	Hà Tây province	Physics	Kinh	Male	
7	Phạm Hưng	New	Member	1927	1946	Hải Hưng province	—	Kinh	Male	
8	Đặng Hữu	New	Member	1930	—	Bình Định province	Transportation engineering	Kinh	Male	
9	Nguyễn Khánh	New	Member	1928	—	Hà Tây province	Philosophy	Kinh	Male	
10	Đinh Văn Lạp	New	Alternate					Kinh	Male	
11	Trần Đức Lương	New	Member	1937	1961	Quảng Ngãi province	Geological engineering	Kinh	Male	
12	Chu Tam Thức	New	Not					Kinh	Male	
13	Phan Ngọc Tường	New	Member	1929	—	Bình Trị Thiên	Mechanical engineering	Kinh	Male	
14	Lê Văn Triết	New	Member	1930	—	Tiền Giang province	—	Kinh	Male	
15	Nguyến Tấn Trịnh	New	Promoted	1936	—	Quảng Nam province	Fisheries science	Kinh	Male	
16	Hà Xuân Trường	New	Alternate	1924	—	Hà Tĩnh province	—	Kinh	Male	
17	Nguyên Chí Vu	New	Alternate					Kinh	Male	
18	Phạm Thế Duyệt	New	Member	1936	1965	Hải Dương province	Mining engineering & economic management	Kinh	Male	
19	Trần Thị Đường	New	Alternate	1939	—	Culture and technology	Hà Tĩnh province	Kinh	Female	
20	Vũ Ngọc Hải	New	Member	1931	—	Bình Trị Thiên	Electrical engineering	Kinh	Male	
21	Vũ Tuyên Hoàng	New	Member	1938	—	Hà Nội City	Agricultural science	Kinh	Male	
22	Phan Thanh Liêm	New	Promoted	1933	—	Thừa Thiên Huế province	Mechanical engineering	Kinh	Male	
23	Nguyễn Thị Yến	New	Not					Kinh	Female	
24	Nguyễn Văn An	New	Member	1937	1959	Nam Định province	Electrical engineering	Kinh	Male	
25	Lê Đại	New	Not					Kinh	Male	
26	Trần Anh Điền	New	Not	1922	1947	Sa Đéc province	—	Kinh	Male	
27	Hà Trọng Hoà	New	Member					Kinh	Male	
28	Hà Thiết Hùng	New	Member	1929	—	—	—	Tày	Male	
29	Phan Văn Khải	New	Promoted	1933	1959	Hồ Chí Minh City	Economics	Kinh	Male	
30	Trần Tấn	New	Member	1927	1945	Hà Nội City	—	Kinh	Male	
31	Đoàn Duy Thành	New	Promoted	1929	1946	Hải Dương province	—	Kinh	Male	
32	Đoàn Thanh Vị	New	Not	1929	—	Minh Hải province	—	Kinh	Male	
33	Nguyễn Thị Ngọc Liên	New	Promoted	1943	—	Bình Dương province	—	Kinh	Female	
34	Tráng A Pao	New	Member	1945	—	Lào Cai province	Economics	Hmong	Male	
35	Nguyễn Hoà	New	Alternate	1927	1946	Hưng Yên province	Military science	Kinh	Male	
36	Hồ Quang Hoá	New	Not					Kinh	Male	

== Bibliography ==
- Guan, Ang Cheng (2002). "Vietnam: Another Milestone and the Country Plods On". Southeast Asian Affairs. 2002. ISEAS–Yusof Ishak Institute: 345–356. JSTOR 27913216.
- Hung, Nguyen Manh (2000). "Vietnam in 1999: The Party's Choice". Asian Survey. 40 (1). University of California Press: 98–111. doi:10.2307/3021225. JSTOR 3021225.
- Vasavakul, Thaveeporn (1998). "Vietnam's One-Party Rule and Socialist Democracy?". Southeast Asian Affairs. ISEAS–Yusof Ishak Institute: 309–327. JSTOR 27912210.
- Thayer, Carlyle (2001). "Vietnam in 2000: Toward the Ninth Party Congress". Asian Survey. 41 (1). University of California Press: 81–89. doi:10.1525/as.2001.41.1.181. JSTOR 10.1525/as.2001.41.1.181.
