= Xuyên =

Places with the Vietnamese syllable Xuyên in them include:

- Bình Xuyên District, rural district (huyện) of Vĩnh Phúc province, Vietnam
- Cẩm Xuyên District, rural district (huyện) of Hà Tĩnh province, Vietnam
- Duy Xuyên District, district (huyện) of Quảng Nam province, Vietnam
- Long Xuyên, capital city of An Giang province, Vietnam
  - Roman Catholic Diocese of Long Xuyên, Roman Catholic diocese of Vietnam
- Mỹ Xuyên District, rural district (huyện) of Sóc Trăng province, Vietnam
- Phú Xuyên District, district (huyện) of Hà Tây province, Vietnam
- Quảng Xuyên, former district of South Vietnam
- Vị Xuyên District is a district (huyện) of Hà Giang province, Vietnam
- Xuyên Mộc, commune (xã) and village in Xuyên Mộc district, Bà Rịa–Vũng Tàu province, in Vietnam
- Xuyên Mộc District, rural district (huyện) of Ba Ria–Vung Tau province, Vietnam

People with the syllable Xuyên in their names include:

- Dominic Xuyen Van Nguyen, one of the Vietnamese Martyrs of Tonkin, saints canonized by Pope John Paul II
- Lý Tế Xuyên (fl. 1400s), Vietnamese historian
- Nguyễn Trọng Xuyên (1926–2012), Vietnam People's Army general
- Nguyễn Thị Xuyến (fl. 2010s), Vietnamese footballer

== See also ==
- Ba Xuyen, breed of domestic pig from South Vietnam, specifically the Mekong Delta
- Bình Xuyên, independent military force within the Vietnamese National Army
- Xu Yan (disambiguation)
- Xu Yuan (disambiguation)
- Xue Yuan
- Xu Wen
