= 6th Secretariat of the Communist Party of Vietnam =

Secretariat of Vietnam's Communist Party

The 6th Secretariat of the Communist Party of Vietnam (CPV), formally the 6th Secretariat of the Central Committee of the Communist Party of Vietnam (Vietnamese: Ban Bí thư Ban Chấp hành Trung ương Đảng Cộng sản Việt Nam Khoá VI), was elected by the 1st Plenary Session of the 6th Central Committee (CC) in the immediate aftermath of the 6th National Congress.

== Members ==
Members of the 6th Secretariat of the Communist Party of Vietnam
Rank	Name	5th SEC		7th SEC		Birth	PM	Birthplace	Education	Ethnicity	Gender	Ref.
Rank	Name	New	Rank	New	Rank	Birth	PM	Birthplace	Education	Ethnicity	Gender	Ref.
1	Nguyễn Văn Linh	Old	11	Not	—	1915	1936	Hưng Yên province	—	Kinh	Male	
2	Nguyễn Đức Tâm	Old	4	Not	—	1920	1944	Thái Bình province	—	Kinh	Male	
3	Trần Xuân Bách	Old	10	Removed	—	1924	—	Nam Định province	—	Kinh	Male	
4	Đào Duy Tùng	New	—	Reelected	3	1924	1945	Phúc Yên City	—	Kinh	Male	
5	Trần Kiên	Old	9	Not	—	1920	1945	Quảng Ngãi province	—	Kinh	Male	
6	Lê Phước Thọ	New	—	Reelected	4	1927	1949	Minh Hải province	—	Kinh	Male	
7	Nguyễn Quyết	New	—	Not	—	1922	1940	Hưng Yên province	—	Kinh	Male	
8	Đàm Quang Trung	New	—	Not	—	1921	1939	Cao Bằng province	Military science	Tày	Male	
9	Vũ Oanh	New	—	Not	—	1924	1941	Hải Hưng province	—	Kinh	Male	
10	Nguyễn Khánh	New	—	Not	—	1928	—	Hà Tây province	Philosophy	Kinh	Male	
11	Trần Quyết	New	—	Not	—	1922	1943	Hà Nam province	—	Kinh	Male	
12	Trần Quốc Hương	New	—	Not	—	1924	1943	Hà Nam province	—	Kinh	Male	
13	Phạm Thế Duyệt	New	—	Not	—	1936	1965	Hải Dương province	Mining engineering & economic management	Kinh	Male	
14	Nguyễn Thanh Bình	By-election	—	Not	—	1918	1939	Bắc Ninh province	—	Kinh	Male	

== Bibliography ==
- Avery, Dorothy R. (January 1993). "Vietnam in 1992: Win Some; Lose Some". Asian Survey. 33 (1). University of California Press: 67–74. doi:10.2307/2645288. JSTOR 2645288.
