= Pham Chuyen =

Pham Chuyen (1922- November 2014), code-named Agent ARES, was a CIA agent recruited by the CIA in South Vietnam in 1961 and was the first long term operative there. North Vietnam’s Public Security Bureau captured and manipulated Chuyen to turn double agent shortly after his deployment in the North. Chuyen was active from 1961 to 1970, his double agent activities led to many deaths of CIA and U.S. military personnel, whom he led into traps by requesting new supplies. He later received 12 medals including the Medal of Homeland Security in 1997 from the Ministry of Public Security for his accomplishments in the resistance war against American rescue.

== Early life ==
Pham Chuyen was born in 1922 in North Vietnam during the French Colonial Era. Chuyen trained in radio broadcasting and participated in the August Revolution against France. He worked for the Quang Yen Security Bureau, however the French arrested Chuyen in October 1947. After being freed, Chuyen worked for the secretary of the council in Hong Gai Town. Chuyen returned home in May 1948 and was admitted to the party. Later in 1948, Chuyen took charge of three communes in the Yen Hung District. He specialized working in the emulation board in 1949.

In 1950, Chuyen moved to the Quang Yen Provincial Party Committee. In 1953, the party committee sent him to the Party School to specialize in corruption. In 1957, Chuyen took a mistress and was outcast from the party. Chuyen left his designated agency in 1957 due to professional discontent. Chuyen then decided to specialize in folk singing; however, that all changed in 1959.

== Unrest in North Vietnam ==
On 25 June 1959, the People's Court of Yen Hung called Pham Chuyen to question him on anti-government activities. Chuyen fled South. First, he fled to Hanoi where he bought a ticket to Vinh. From Vinh, Chuyen followed Route 8 to the border of Laos where he stayed for nine months. In Laos, Savanakhet questioned Chuyen. In May 1960, Chuyen left Laos to the reception center in Saigon, South Vietnam. Chuyen hoped for the South to assign him work. The Department of Political Studies assigned him to talk in localities to present content about cooperatives in the North and the agricultural tax.

A few months into his new job, a man by the name of Phan talked to Chuyen. Phan was an employee of the Political Bureau of the Presidential Office. In mid-September 1960, Phan took Chuyen to Majestic Hotel, where he met an American operative. The operative asked Chuyen what he thought of the South and ended the conversation. A week later, Phan and Chuyen met the American in a mansion where he asked Chuyen psychological questions. When the meeting finished the American wished Chuyen success and told him government officials will meet him.

== CIA recruitment ==
In 1961, needing potential agents, the CIA and ARVN recruited and trained Pham Chuyen for a five-year infiltration plan in Northern Vietnam. Lieutenant Do Van Tien, code-named FRANCOIS, was responsible for the training and dispatching single spies to infiltrate North Vietnam. At first, Chuyen refused but Lieutenant Colonel Le Quang Tung monitored and enticed Chuyen for half a year. After six months of the CIA following him, Chuyen accepted. The CIA sent him to Nha Trang to do psychological tests where he received excellent grades. Then, Chuyen had to pass two more tests, one in Saigon and another in Nha Trang. Then, the CIA trained Chuyen in communication skills. Pham Chuyen, code-named ARES, was to return to North Vietnam to spy on his homeland.

April 1961, the CIA dispatched Pham Chuyen to North Vietnam via boat 35 miles from Hanoi, near Quang Yen, on a beach near Ha Long Bay. According to a World Security report, villagers noticed the unfamiliar boat. Villagers reported seeing a stranger in the hilly woods of La Khe Hamlet who looked like Chuyen. Informants in the village reported Chuyen left the area to see his mother.

== Double agent ==
When Pham Chuyen engaged in conversation with a local spy, he failed in his mission from the CIA. Chuyen told the spy he had come to conduct operations in the North. Days later, Northern security forces took Chuyen and his supplies, including his radio. It was then that the North's "Public Security Bureau", a powerful intelligence agency modelled after Russia's KGB, convinced him to turn double agent.

Pham Chuyen's turn to a double agent caused the capture and death of many U.S. military and CIA controlled spies for a decade. Walter McIntosh, former chief of Vietnam operations in the CIA, stated he knew Chuyen was a double agent. McIntosh wrote a 12-page document providing evidence that Chuyen was in fact a double agent and that the North compromised his mission. However, Chuyen was under the control of MACV-SOG and they did not heed McIntosh's warning. 12 men died while trying to resupply Chuyen.

Pham Chuyen's handlers in Hanoi created over 300 fake intelligence reports for him to hand over to Saigon. These fake intelligence reports included misleading maps with coordinates to missile sites, trains, rail lines, bridges, factories, and other target areas of U.S. warplanes. Chuyen's handler had fake reports transmitted by radio, to move suspicion away Chuyen. Chuyen often reported the North stealing his equipment which prompted MACV-SOG to send him more supplies resulting in the death of the resuppliers. Pham Chuyen's handler in Hanoi was Nguyen Tai who was a top spy in Saigon from 1966 to 1970. Tai hid his spies’ names and created cover stories for his operatives.

== End of career ==
In December 1969, MACV-SOG demand Pham Chuyen and along with another spy, agent EAGLE, to the South. In 1970, Chuyen's handlers in the North allowed him to live a normal life. Chuyen moved his wife and two children, a daughter and son, to his parents’ home in Yen Hung district. Chuyen spent the rest of his days as a farmer. In 2003, Chuyen wrote an autobiography, which he gave to his old friend from the North Major General Le Mai, that there are few things authors get about his story. “The things Tourison writes about me are often "a little bit of the pot", which is not, of course, not to be argued, not to blame (...). However, there are two things which Tourison said: I have many names. During resistance against the French, I was Nguyen Thiet. In peace, in the newspaper Vietnam Independence, I was Pham Van. In Saigon, in 1959 I was named Nguyen Bao Thuy. In the anti-American war, in the spy mission, people gave me the alias Ha Long, code-named Ares, which the US Intelligence Agency also used. My "rice name" (given name) is Pham Chuyen. Second, this is also the more important thing, Tourison did not dare assert who I worked for. For the Saigon intelligence agency or the Ministry of Public Security of the Democratic Republic of Vietnam?”.

Pham Chuyen died after months of an unknown illness at 93 in 2014.
