= 3rd Secretariat of the Workers' Party of Vietnam =

Secretariat of Vietnam's Communist Party

The 3rd Secretariat of the Workers' Party of Vietnam (WPV), formally the 3rd Secretariat of the Central Committee of the Workers' Party of Vietnam (Vietnamese: Ban Bí thư Ban Chấp hành Trung ương Đảng Lao động Việt Nam Khoá III), was elected by the 1st Plenary Session of the 3rd Central Committee (CC) in the immediate aftermath of the 3rd National Congress.

== Members ==
Members of the 3rd Secretariat of the Workers' Party of Vietnam
Rank	Name	2nd SEC	4th SEC		Birth	PM	Birthplace	Ethnicity	Gender	Ref.
Rank	Name	2nd SEC	New	Rank	Birth	PM	Birthplace	Ethnicity	Gender	Ref.
1	Lê Duẩn	Old	Reelected	1	1907	1930	Quảng Trị Province	Kinh	Male	
2	Phạm Hùng	Old	Not	—	1912	1930	Vĩnh Long province	Kinh	Male	
3	Lê Đức Thọ	New	Reelected	3	1911	1930	Nam Định province	Kinh	Male	
4	Nguyễn Chí Thanh	New	Not	—	1914	1937	Thừa Thiên Huế province	Kinh	Male	
5	Hoàng Anh	Old	Not	—	1912	1937	Thừa Thiên Huế province	Kinh	Male	
6	Tố Hữu	Old	Reelected	6	1920	1938	Thừa Thiên Huế province	Kinh	Male	
7	Lê Văn Lương	Old	Not	—	1912	1930	Bắc Ninh province	Kinh	Male	
8	Nguyễn Văn Trân	New	Not	—	1917	1935	Bắc Ninh province	Kinh	Male	
9	Nguyễn Côn	New	Not	—	1916	1937	Nghệ An province	Kinh	Male	

== Bibliography ==
- Avery, Dorothy R. (January 1993). "Vietnam in 1992: Win Some; Lose Some". Asian Survey. 33 (1). University of California Press: 67–74. doi:10.2307/2645288. JSTOR 2645288.
