= 5th Secretariat of the Communist Party of Vietnam =

Secretariat of Vietnam's Communist Party

The 5th Secretariat of the Communist Party of Vietnam (CPV), formally the 5th Secretariat of the Central Committee of the Communist Party of Vietnam (Vietnamese: Ban Bí thư Ban Chấp hành Trung ương Đảng Cộng sản Việt Nam Khoá V), was elected by the 1st Plenary Session of the 5th Central Committee (CC) in the immediate aftermath of the 5th National Congress.

== Members ==
Members of the 5th Secretariat of the Communist Party of Vietnam
Rank	Name	4th SEC		6th SEC		Birth	PM	Birthplace	Ethnicity	Gender	Ref.
Rank	Name	New	Rank	New	Rank	Birth	PM	Birthplace	Ethnicity	Gender	Ref.
1	Lê Duẩn	Old	1	Died	—	1907	1930	Quảng Trị Province	Kinh	Male	
2	Lê Đức Thọ	Old	2	Not	—	1911	1930	Nam Định province	Kinh	Male	
3	Võ Chí Công	New	—	Not	—	1912	1935	Đà Nẵng City	Kinh	Male	
4	Nguyễn Đức Tâm	New	—	Reelected	2	1920	1944	Thái Bình province	Kinh	Male	
5	Nguyễn Lam	Old	7	Not	—	1922	1943	Hà Nam province	Kinh	Male	
6	Lê Quang Đạo	Old	9	Not	—	1921	1940	Bắc Ninh province	Kinh	Male	
7	Hoàng Tùng	New	—	Not	—	1920	1943	Hà Nam province	Kinh	Male	
8	Nguyễn Thanh Bình	New	—	Not	—	1918	1939	Bắc Ninh province	Kinh	Male	
9	Trần Kiên	New	—	Reelected	5	1920	1945	Quảng Ngãi province	Kinh	Male	
10	Trần Xuân Bách	New	—	Reelected	3	1924	—	Nam Định province	Kinh	Male	
11	Nguyễn Văn Linh	By-election	—	Reelected	1	1915	1936	Hưng Yên province	Kinh	Male	

== Bibliography ==
- Avery, Dorothy R. (January 1993). "Vietnam in 1992: Win Some; Lose Some". Asian Survey. 33 (1). University of California Press: 67–74. doi:10.2307/2645288. JSTOR 2645288.
