= 7th Secretariat of the Communist Party of Vietnam =

Secretariat of Vietnam's Communist Party

The 7th Secretariat of the Communist Party of Vietnam (CPV), formally the 7th Secretariat of the Central Committee of the Communist Party of Vietnam (Vietnamese: Ban Bí thư Ban Chấp hành Trung ương Đảng Cộng sản Việt Nam Khoá VII), was elected by the 1st Plenary Session of the 7th Central Committee (CC) in the immediate aftermath of the 7th National Congress.

== Members ==
Members of the 7th Secretariat of the Communist Party of Vietnam
Rank	Name	6th SEC		8th PSC		Birth	PM	Birthplace	Education	Ethnicity	Gender	Ref.
Rank	Name	New	Rank	New	Rank	Birth	PM	Birthplace	Education	Ethnicity	Gender	Ref.
1	Đỗ Mười	New	—	Reelected	1	1917	1939	Hà Nội City	—	Kinh	Male	
2	Lê Đức Anh	New	—	Reelected	2	1920	1938	Thừa Thiên Huế province	—	Kinh	Male	
3	Đào Duy Tùng	Old	3	Not	—	1924	1945	Phúc Yên City	—	Kinh	Male	
4	Lê Phước Thọ	Old	6	Not	—	1927	1949	Minh Hải province	—	Kinh	Male	
5	Nguyễn Hà Phan	New	—	Removed	—	1933	—	Bến Tre province	—	Kinh	Male	
6	Hồng Hà	New	—	Not	—	1928	1947	Nam Định province	—	Kinh	Male	
7	Nguyễn Đình Tứ	New	—	Not	—	1932	—	Nghệ Tĩnh province	Mathematics & physics	Kinh	Male	
8	Trương Mỹ Hoa	New	—	Not	—	1945	—	Tiền Giang province	Economics & the arts	Kinh	Female	
9	Đỗ Quang Thắng	New	—	Not	—	1927	1946	Quảng Ngãi province	—	Kinh	Male	
10	Nguyễn Đức Bình	By-election	—	Not	—	1927	1945	Hà Tĩnh province	Philosophy	Kinh	Male	
11	Lê Khả Phiêu	By-election	—	Reelected	4	1931	1949	Thanh Hóa province	Military science	Kinh	Male	

== Bibliography ==
- Avery, Dorothy R. (January 1993). "Vietnam in 1992: Win Some; Lose Some". Asian Survey. 33 (1). University of California Press: 67–74. doi:10.2307/2645288. JSTOR 2645288.
