= 2nd Secretariat of the Workers' Party of Vietnam =

Secretariat of Vietnam's Communist Party

The 2nd Secretariat of the Workers' Party of Vietnam (WPV), formally the 2nd Secretariat of the Central Committee of the Workers' Party of Vietnam (Vietnamese: Ban Bí thư Ban Chấp hành Trung ương Đảng Lao động Việt Nam Khoá II), was elected by the 1st Plenary Session of the 2nd Central Committee (CC) in the immediate aftermath of the 2nd National Congress.

== Members ==
Members of the 2nd Secretariat of the Workers' Party of Vietnam
| Name | Elected | 3rd SEC | | Birth | PM | Birthplace | Ethnicity | Gender | Ref. |
| Name | Elected | New | Rank | Birth | PM | Birthplace | Ethnicity | Gender | Ref. |
|---|---|---|---|---|---|---|---|---|---|
| Trường Chinh | 13 March 1951 | Removed | — | 1907 | 1930 | Nam Định province | Kinh | Male | |
| Phạm Văn Đồng | 13 March 1951 | Resigned | — | 1906 | 1930 | Quảng Ngãi province | Kinh | Male | |
| Lê Văn Lương | 13 March 1951 | Removed | — | 1912 | 1930 | Bắc Ninh province | Kinh | Male | |
| Nguyễn Duy Trinh | 20 August 1955 | Not | — | 1910 | 1930 | Nghệ An province | Kinh | Male | |
| Hồ Chí Minh | 29 October 1956 | Resigned | — | 1890 | 1930 | Nghệ An province | Kinh | Male | |
| Võ Nguyên Giáp | 29 October 1956 | Resigned | — | 1911 | 1930 | Quảng Bình province | Kinh | Male | |
| Lê Duẩn | 1957 | Reelected | 1 | 1907 | 1930 | Quảng Trị Province | Kinh | Male | |
| Phạm Hùng | 27 November 1958 | Reelected | 2 | 1912 | 1930 | Vĩnh Long province | Kinh | Male | |
| Hoàng Anh | 27 November 1958 | Reelected | 5 | 1912 | 1937 | Thừa Thiên Huế province | Kinh | Male | |
| Tố Hữu | 27 November 1958 | Reelected | 6 | 1920 | 1938 | Thừa Thiên Huế province | Kinh | Male | |

== Bibliography ==
- Avery, Dorothy R. (January 1993). "Vietnam in 1992: Win Some; Lose Some". Asian Survey. 33 (1). University of California Press: 67–74. doi:10.2307/2645288. JSTOR 2645288.
