= 4th Secretariat of the Communist Party of Vietnam =

Secretariat of Vietnam's Communist Party

The 4th Secretariat of the Communist Party of Vietnam (CPV), formally the 4th Secretariat of the Central Committee of the Communist Party of Vietnam (Vietnamese: Ban Bí thư Ban Chấp hành Trung ương Đảng Cộng sản Việt Nam Khoá IV), was elected by the 1st Plenary Session of the 4th Central Committee (CC) in the immediate aftermath of the 4th National Congress.

== Members ==
Members of the 4th Secretariat of the Communist Party of Vietnam
Rank	Name	3rd SEC		5th SEC		Birth	PM	Birthplace	Ethnicity	Gender	Ref.
Rank	Name	New	Rank	New	Rank	Birth	PM	Birthplace	Ethnicity	Gender	Ref.
1	Lê Duẩn	Old	1	Reelected	1	1907	1930	Quảng Trị Province	Kinh	Male	
2	Lê Đức Thọ	Old	3	Reelected	2	1911	1930	Nam Định province	Kinh	Male	
3	Nguyễn Duy Trinh	New	—	Not	—	1910	1930	Nghệ An province	Kinh	Male	
4	Nguyễn Văn Linh	New	—	Not	—	1915	1936	Hưng Yên province	Kinh	Male	
5	Tố Hữu	Old	6	Not	—	1920	1938	Thừa Thiên province	Kinh	Male	
6	Xuân Thuỷ	New	—	Not	—	1912	1941	Hà Đông City	Kinh	Male	
7	Nguyễn Lam	New	—	Reelected	5	1922	1943	Hà Nam province	Kinh	Male	
8	Song Hào	New	—	Not	—	1917	1939	Nam Định province	Kinh	Male	
9	Lê Quang Đạo	New	—	Reelected	6	1921	1940	Bắc Ninh province	Kinh	Male	
10	Trần Quốc Hoàn	By-election	—	Not	—	1916	1934	Nghệ An province	Kinh	Male	
11	Lê Thanh Nghị	By-election	—	Not	—	1911	1930	Hải Dương province	Kinh	Male	

== Bibliography ==
- Avery, Dorothy R. (January 1993). "Vietnam in 1992: Win Some; Lose Some". Asian Survey. 33 (1). University of California Press: 67–74. doi:10.2307/2645288. JSTOR 2645288.
