= Hoàng Thị Tuân =

Vietnamese politician

Hoàng Thị Tuân (born 13 May 1965) is a representative in the Twelfth Việtnamese National Assembly.

A member of the Tày ethnic minority, Tuân was born in Phì Điền village, Lục Ngạn District, Bắc Giang Province. She was accepted into the Communist Party of Việt Nam on 5 July 1997, though she has still not been made an official member.
