= Sojourn (journal) =

- Discipline: Southeast Asian studies
- Language: English
- Edited by: Su-Ann Oh

Publication details
- History: 1986-present
- Publisher: Institute of Southeast Asian Studies (Singapore)
- Frequency: Triannually

Standard abbreviations
- ISO 4: Sojourn

Indexing
- ISSN: 0217-9520 (print); 1793-2858 (web)
- JSTOR: sojourn

Links
- Journal homepage

Sojourn: Journal of Social Issues in Southeast Asia is an interdisciplinary journal devoted to the study of social and cultural issues in Southeast Asia. It publishes empirical and theoretical research articles to promote and disseminate scholarship in and on the region. Areas of special concern include ethnicity, religion, tourism, urbanization, migration, popular culture, social and cultural change, and development. Fields most often represented in the journal are anthropology, sociology and history. Three issues of Sojourn are published per year (March, July, November).

== Abstracting and Indexing ==
Sojourn is abstracted and indexed in the Social Sciences Citation Index and Scopus.
