= Lê Phước Thọ =

Vietnamese politician (1927–2023)

Head of the Central Organisation Commission of the Communist Party of Vietnam
- In office 7 July 1991 – 1 January 1996
- Preceded by: Nguyễn Đức Tâm
- Succeeded by: Nguyễn Văn An

Member of the 7th Politburo of the Communist Party of Vietnam
- In office 27 June 1991 – 2 July 1996

Member of the 6th–7th Secretariat of the Communist Party of Vietnam
- In office 18 December 1986 – 2 July 1996

Member of the 5th–7th Central Committee of the Communist Party of Vietnam
- In office 27 June 1991 – July 1996

Alternate member of the 4th Central Committee of the Communist Party of Vietnam
- In office 20 December 1976 – 1 July 1996

Personal details
- Born: Lê Phước Thọ; 25 December 1927 Tân Lộc, Thới Bình district, Cà Mau province, Nguyễn dynasty
- Died: 6 July 2023 (aged 95) Cần Thơ, Vietnam
- Party: Communist Party of Vietnam
- Awards: Ho Chi Minh Order

Lê Phước Thọ (25 December 1927 – 6 July 2023), commonly known as Sáu Hậu, was a Vietnamese politician. He was a member of the seventh electoral term of the Politburo of the Communist Party of Vietnam, a member of the Secretariat for the sixth and seventh electoral term, a member of the Central Committee from the fifth to seventh electoral term. Moreover, he was an alternate of the Central Committee's fourth term. He served as the head of the Central Committee of Agriculture, the head of the Organisation Department, and secretary of Hậu Giang Provincial Party Committee.

Lê Phước joined the Communist Party of Vietnam, then known as the Indochinese Communist Party, in 1949. During his party and state activities, he was awarded the badges of 30, 40 and 45 years of party life. After retiring, he was awarded a 50-year party senior badge.

Lê Phước Thọ died in Cần Thơ at his home on 6 July 2023, at the age of 95.

== Awarded ==
- Ho Chi Minh Order
- 75 years of party life
