= Terence Chong =

Chinese academic

- 莊太量
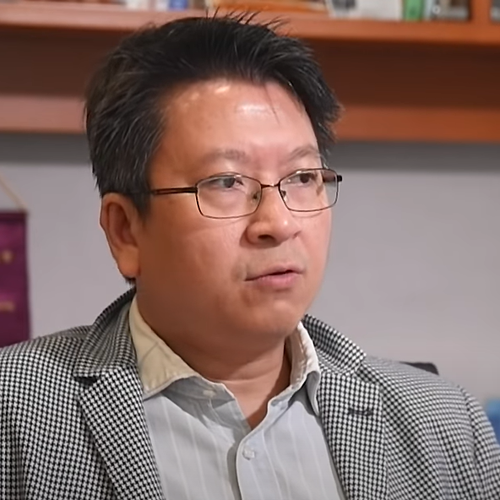
- Chong in 2019
- Born: Chong Tai-leung
- Education: Sheng Kung Hui Holy Carpenter Primary School; Rotary Secondary School of the Church of Christ in China; Church of Christ in China Kei Heep Secondary School; Chinese University of Hong Kong the University of Rochester

Terence Chong Tai-leung (Note: The enrolled name in Hong Kong Government is Chong Tai-leung.) (traditional Chinese: 莊太量; simplified Chinese: 庄太量) is Associate Professor of the Department of Economics at the Chinese University of Hong Kong, executive director of the Lau Chor Tak Institute of Global Economics and Finance, Associate Dean of New Asia College and co-director of the Interdisciplinary Major Programme in Global Economics and Finance.

== Background ==
Chong was born in Fujian, China, and moved to Hong Kong at the age of five. He attended Sheng Kung Hui Holy Carpenter Primary School in his early years, and later entered the Rotary Secondary School of the Church of Christ in China, After graduating from Form 5 in 1986, he transferred to the Church of Christ in China Kei Heep Secondary School to study for a foundation course, In 1987, he took the Hong Kong Higher-Level Examination. He received his Bachelor of Social Sciences in Economics from the Chinese University of Hong Kong in 1991 and his Doctor of Philosophy in Economics from the University of Rochester in the United States in 1995. He moved back to Hong Kong in 1995. Professor Chong Tai-leung is currently an Associate Professor in the Department of Economics at the Chinese University of Hong Kong, Executive Director of the Lau Chor-tak Institute of Global Economics and Finance and Co-Director of the Interdisciplinary Major Programme in Global Economics and Finance. He was also Si Yuan Chair Professor at Nanjing University from 2013 to 2016 and Dean of Education at New Asia College from 2016 to 2021. Chong's professional research area is quantitative finance. He is one of the top 5% economists (RePEc) in the world, and his outstanding output ranks among the top 1% in the world. He was ranked 37th in the world in theoretical econometrics from 2000 to 2005. He is the author of the book "Seven Alchemy Decisions in Life" and more than 700 papers published in international academic journals and newspapers in China and Hong Kong. In addition, he frequently exchanges economic views with Chinese and Hong Kong government officials and business leaders, and holds a number of public offices.

== Personal life ==
Chong has a son, whom he enroled in an international school that follows the British education system.
