= Trần Hoàn =

Vietnamese songwriter and performer

Trần Hoàn, born Nguyễn Tăng Hích (1928 – 23 November 2003), was a Vietnamese songwriter and performer. Born in Hải Lăng, Quảng Trị, he composed over 150 popular and classical songs. He was a recipient of the Hồ Chí Minh Prize in 2000. He became the president of the Alliance of Arts and Literature Associations of Vietnam in March 2003, a few months before his death.

== Discography ==
- Album - Trần Hoàn Tuyệt Phẩm Bất Hủ
- Album - Tình Khúc Trần Hoàn
