= Xu Yuan =

Xu Yuan is the atonal romanization of the Mandarin pronunciation of various Chinese characters.

It may refer to:

== Gardens ==
- Xu Garden (煦园), Xù Yuán), a Chinese garden at the Presidential Palace in Nanjing, Jiangsu, China
- Xu Garden (徐园), Xú Yuán), a Chinese garden at Slender West Lake in Yangzhou, Jiangsu, China

== People ==
- Xu Yuan (general) (許遠, 709–757), general of Tang Dynasty
- Xu Yuan (footballer) (徐媛, b. 1985), female Chinese football player
- Xu Yuan (poet) (fl. 1590), Chinese poet

== See also ==
- Xu Yuan Zhen, Olympic sailor from Singapore
