= Hải Lăng =

- Commune
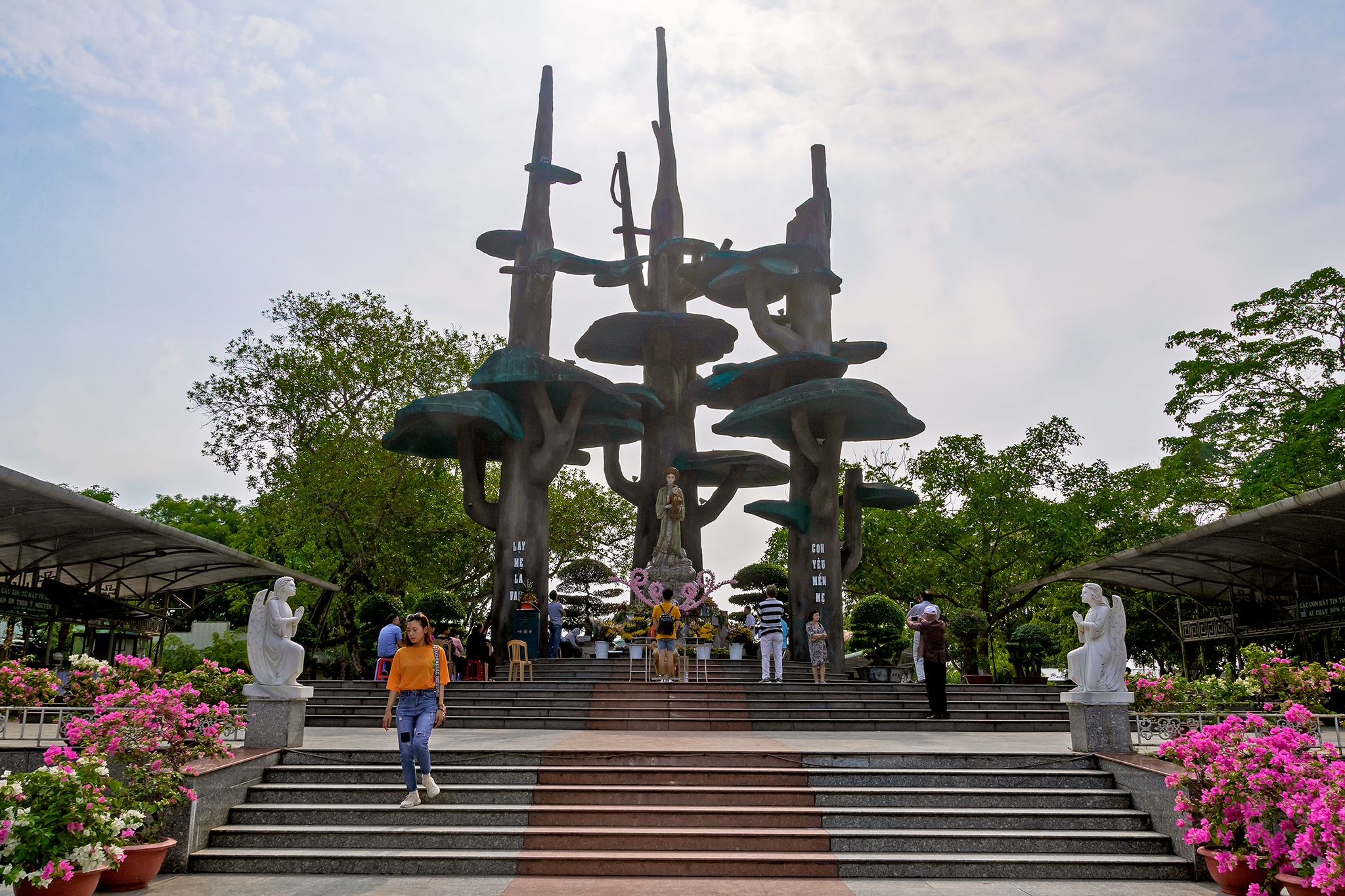
- La Vang Holy Land
- Interactive map of Hải Lăng
- Coordinates: 16.723286060583405°N 107.20614738272054°E
- Country: Vietnam
- Region: North Central Coast
- Province: Quảng Trị
- Established: 16 June 2025

Area
  - Total: 116.89 km^{2} (45.13 sq mi)

Population (2025)
  - Total: 16,589
  - Density: 141/km^{2} (370/sq mi)

Hải Lăng is a commune in Quảng Trị province, Vietnam. The commune inherited its name from the former Hải Lăng district.

== History ==
On 16 June 2025, the Standing Committee of the National Assembly of Vietnam issued Resolution No. 1680/NQ-UBTVQH15 on the arrangement of commune-level administrative units in Quảng Trị province in 2025. Under the resolution, the entire area and population of Hải Phú, Hải Lâm, and Hải Thượng communes in Hải Lăng district were merged to form a new commune named Hải Lăng.
