= Xu Yan =

Xu Yan may refer to:

- Xu Yan 徐彦 (Tang dynasty), purported author of the sub-commentary to the Gongyang Zhuan
- Xu Yan (judoka) (born 1981), Chinese female judoka
- Xu Yan (kickboxer) (born 1987), Chinese male kickboxer
- Xu Yan (table tennis), Singaporean female table tennis player
- Xu Hong Yan, paralympic athlete from China competing mainly in shot put and discus
- Xu Yan, Sun Mingming's wife
