= ISEAS – Yusof Ishak Institute =

Singaporean statutory board and research institution

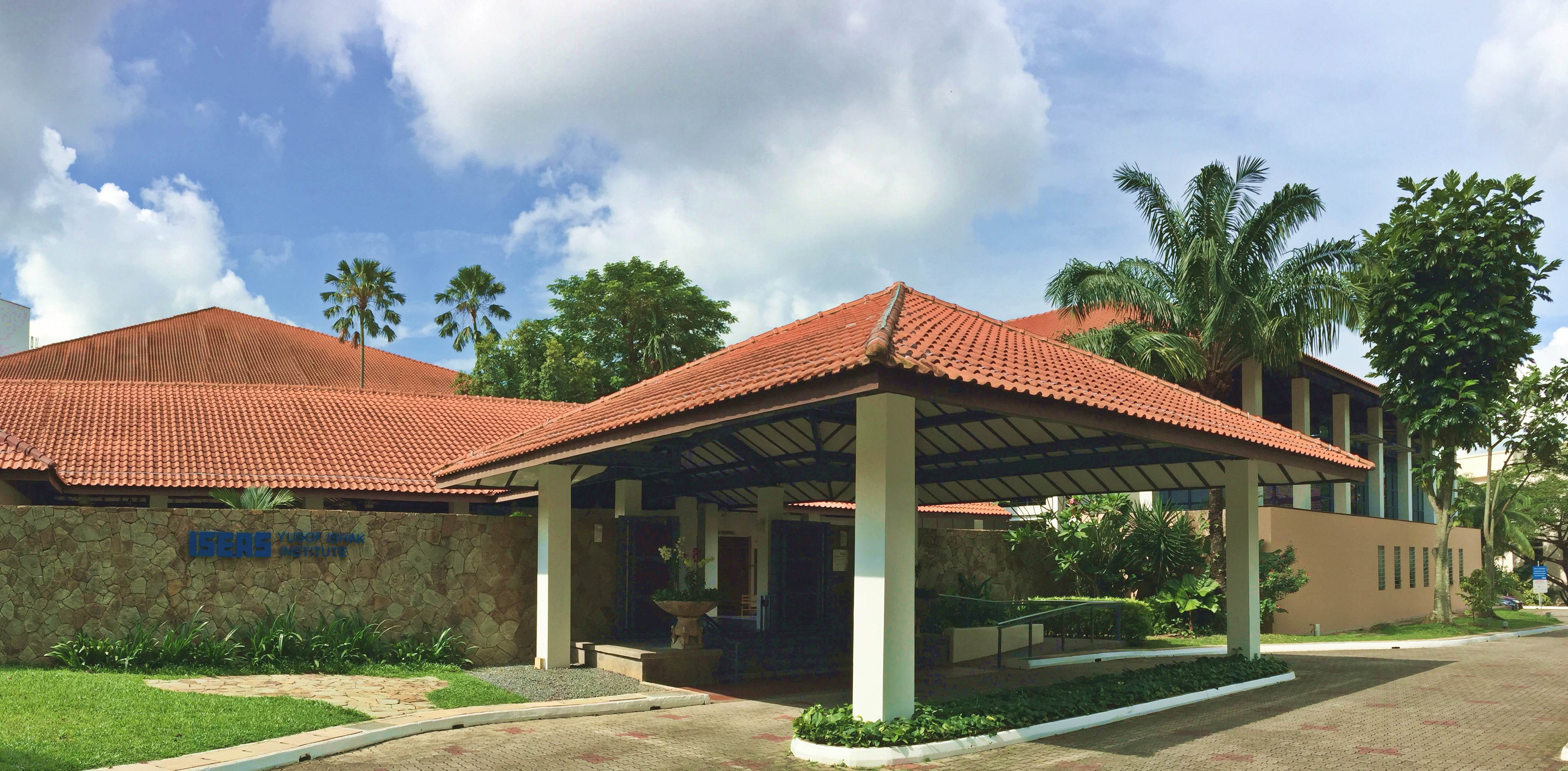
- ISEAS headquarters in Singapore
- Established: 7 June 1968; 58 years ago (as Institute of Southeast Asian Studies)
- Focus: South-east Asia
- Chair: Chan Heng Chee
- Key people: Choi Shing Kwok, Director & CEO Terence Chong, Deputy CEO & Director of Research Tan Tai Tiong, Director (Corporate Services)
- Address: 30 Heng Mui Keng Terrace, Singapore 119614
- Coordinates: 01°17′30″N 103°46′36″E
- Interactive map of ISEAS – Yusof Ishak Institute
- ISEAS – Yusof Ishak Institute

Institute overview
- Jurisdiction: Government of Singapore
- Parent Institute: Ministry of Education
- Website: ISEAS.edu.sg

The ISEAS – Yusof Ishak Institute is a research institution and statutory board under the purview of the Ministry of Education in Singapore. It was established by an Act of Parliament in 1968.

Previously known as the Institute of Southeast Asian Studies (ISEAS), the organisation was renamed as ISEAS – Yusof Ishak Institute on 12 August 2015, in honour of Singapore's first President, Yusof Ishak. The institute celebrated its 50th anniversary in 2018, with Prime Minister Lee Hsien Loong delivering a lecture on 13 March that year.

According to its website, the ISEAS – Yusof Ishak Institute's primary objectives are:

- To be a leading research centre dedicated to the study of socio-political, security, and economic trends and developments in Southeast Asia and its wider geo-strategic and economic environment;
- To stimulate research and debate within scholarly circles, enhance public awareness of the region, and facilitate the search for viable solutions to the varied problems confronting the region;
- To nurture a community of scholars interested in the region and to engage in research on the multi-faceted dimensions and issues of stability and security, economic development, and political, social and cultural change.

The institute conducts a range of research programmes; holds conferences, workshops, lectures and seminars; publishes briefs, research journals and books; and generally provides a range of research support facilities, including a large library collection.

== Research programmes ==
- Regional Economic Studies
- Regional Strategic and Political Studies
- Regional Social and Cultural Studies

== Country Studies Programmes ==
The country-focused programmes are meant to complement the institute's three basic disciplinary programmes, with the cross-affiliation of researchers between the two sets of programmes helping to encourage research projects which are more comparative in nature and are conceptually bolder.

The five country-specific programmes are Indonesia, Malaysia, Myanmar, Thailand, and Vietnam (including Indochina).

== Research Centres ==
- ASEAN Studies Centre
  - Established in 2008 to research on issues pertaining to the Association of Southeast Asian Nations (ASEAN) as an institution and a process.
- Singapore APEC Study Centre
  - Established in 1994 to research, disseminates information, facilitates discussions on APEC-related issues, and promotes linkages with other APEC Study Centres.
- Temasek History Research Centre
  - Established in 2019 to research Singapore's pre-modern history, its economic and socio-cultural links to the region, as well as its historical role as a trading centre.

== ISEAS Publishing ==
The publishing arm of the institution has produced more than 2,000 titles, consisting of books and journals, since the early 1970s. ISEAS Publishing is the largest scholarly publisher of research about south-east Asia and Asia-Pacific from within the region and works with many other academic and trade publishers and distributors to disseminate important research and analyses from and about south-east Asia to the rest of the world. In recent years, ISEAS has published an average of 50 new titles a year. In addition, ISEAS Publishing issues the institute's three tri-annual academic journals: Journal of Southeast Asian Economies; Sojourn: Journal of Social Issues in Southeast Asia; and Contemporary Southeast Asia, as well as the annual Southeast Asian Affairs.

ISEAS books and journals are distributed to over 100 countries worldwide, and are available in both electronic and print versions, via the bookshop located within the institute, and its website.

== ISEAS Library ==
The library houses over half a million items related to south-east Asia in the area of economics, politics, international relations, culture, and social studies. The collections, built up over decades, are both historical and contemporary, including a range of multimedia titles.

The ISEAS library is open to all members of the public interested in the study of the south-east Asian region.
