= Đoàn Duy Thành =

Vietnamese politician (1929–2026)

Đoàn Duy Thành (September 15, 1929 – February 6, 2026) was a Vietnamese politician.

== Life and career ==
Đoàn Duy Thành was born in Kim Thành, Hải Dương on September 15, 1929. Between 1976 and 1979, he was the vice-chairman of the People's Committee of Haiphong, before being named the Deputy Secretary of the city until 1982. He was a member of the Central Committee of the Communist Party of Vietnam; Vice-chairman of the Council of Ministers, Minister of Foreign Economy; and Chairman of the Vietnam Confederation of Commerce and Industry.

Đoàn Duy Thành died on February 6, 2026, at the age of 96.
