= Lê Mai =

Vietnamese diplomat

Lê Mai (born Châu Văn Quyền, 1940 – June 12, 1996) was a distinguished Vietnamese diplomat who served as a member of the Central Committee of the Vietnamese Communist Party and as Deputy Foreign Minister of the Socialist Republic of Vietnam until his death.

Le Mai played a major role in improving post-war relations between Vietnam and the United States, and in Vietnam's post-war foreign policy. Mai was born in central Vietnam in 1940 and served as a junior member of Vietnam's negotiating team at the Paris Peace Talks. After the war ended he served successively as deputy director and director of the Press and Information Department of the Ministry of Foreign Affairs in Hanoi and Assistant Minister of Foreign Affairs (1984-1986), then as Ambassador to Yemen (1986), Ambassador to Thailand (1986-1989), before being named Deputy Minister of Foreign Affairs (1990). In 1994 he joined the Central Committee of the Vietnamese Communist Party.

Upon his death, in an unusual move, the United States State Department noted Mr. Mai's "instrumental role" in "the ongoing process of normalizing the relationship between the United States and Vietnam," and called his death "untimely and tragic." The State Department noted that Mr. Mai was "a highly regarded diplomat and friend to many Americans."

In Vietnam, Mr. Mai was a leader in the Ministry of Foreign Affairs, well known among other matters for his penetrating talks on international affairs delivered to colleagues and younger officials in the early 1990s, which have now been published in Hanoi.
