= Đặng Văn Thân =

Vietnamese politician (1932–2023)

Đặng Văn Thân (6 November 1932 – 24 May 2023) was a Vietnamese politician and public servant. He served as a member of the Central Committee of the Communist Party of Vietnam. Đặng was born on 6 November 1932 and died on 24 May 2023 at the age of 90.
