= Nguyễn Trọng Xuyên =

Vietnamese general

Nguyễn Trọng Xuyên (1926–2012) was a Việt Cộng, and later Vietnamese People's Army, general. In the Battle of Pat To 1969 he was commander of the Việt Cộng's Military Region 6.
