= Nguyễn Văn Chính =

Vietnamese politician

Nguyễn Văn Chính (1 March 1924 – 29 October 2016), also known as Chín Cần, was a Vietnamese politician. He is known for reforms he initiated together with other provincial leaders in the late 1970s and early 1980s in Long An Province, making him one of the earliest reformers. He was secretary of Long An's People's Committee from 1977, Deputy Prime Minister (from 1987 to 1988), and chairman of the Farmers' Association of Vietnam (Vietnamese: Hội Nông dân Việt Nam). He was born in Cần Giuộc District, Long An Province.

== Reforms ==
Long An Province implemented price reforms under Chinh's leadership in 1977. The province bought and sold sugar and peanuts at prices higher than the official prices, thereby giving farmers an incentive to sell and increasing the quantity available for sale (farmers were previously unwilling to sell at the low official prices). The surplus purchased was not sold on to the central state to avoid losses (selling at official prices after buying at higher prices), but to a trading company in Ho Chi Minh City that in return provided the province with consumption goods that would otherwise have been distributed by the central state. This was a violation of rules and the provincial leadership was ordered to discontinue the practice.

Having learned his lesson from 1977, Chinh obtained approval for experimental reforms from Lê Đức Thọ and later Nguyễn Văn Linh in 1979. After the reforms gained nationwide attention, he was asked to report to Prime Minister Lê Duẩn, who praised his reforms as "creative". However, the legitimacy of the reforms was challenged by Nguyễn Duy Trinh because Chinh had not reported to the Prime Minister before implementing them. He died in Ho Chi Minh City on 29 October 2016.
