= Lê Văn Triết =

Vietnamese diplomat (1930–2024)

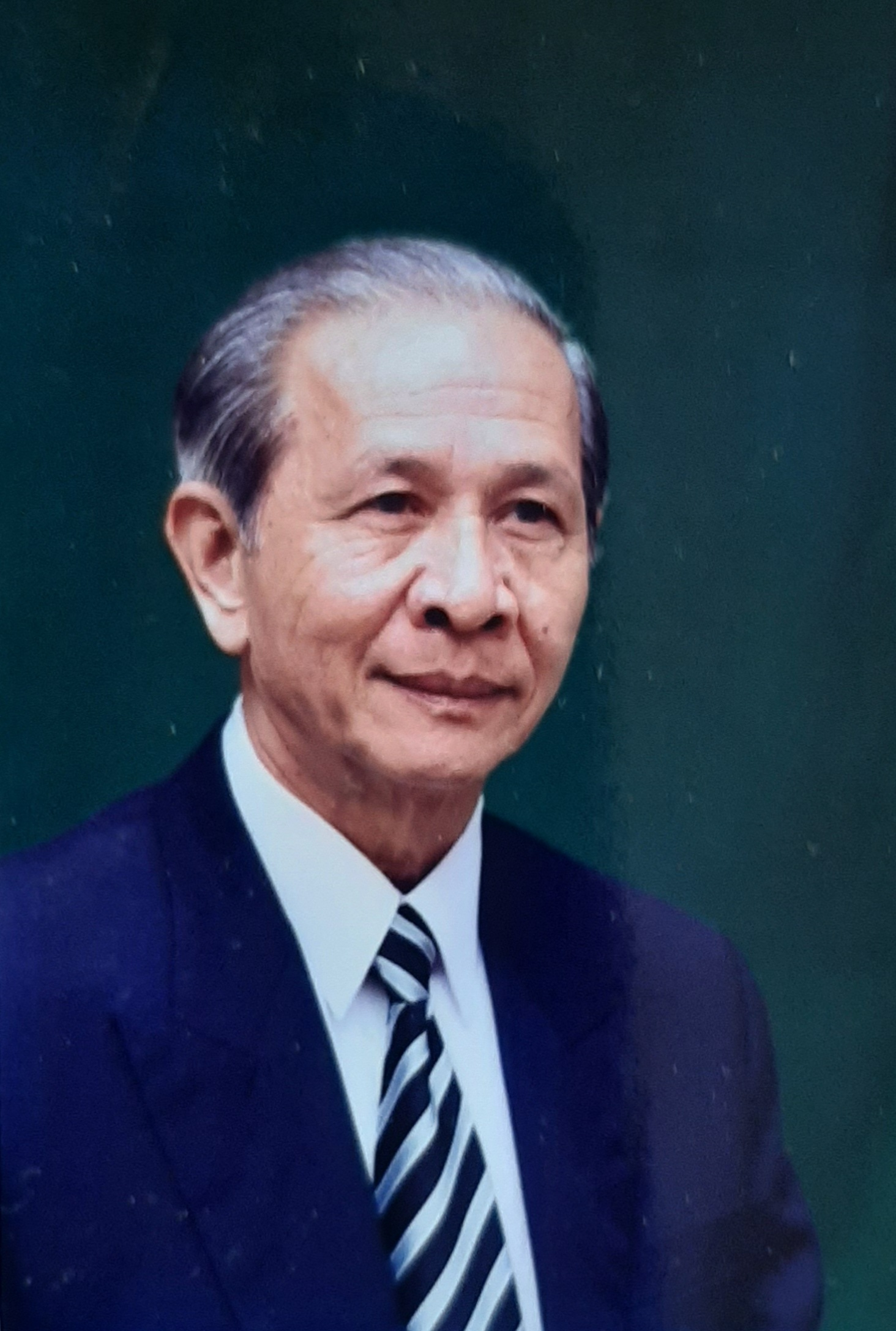
Lê Văn Triết

Lê Văn Triết (6 June 1930 – 13 October 2024) was a Vietnamese diplomat who served as Minister of Trade and Tourism of the Socialist Republic of Vietnam from 1991 to 1992 and Minister of Trade of the Socialist Republic of Vietnam from 1992 to 1997.

He, along with Vietnamese Prime Minister Võ Văn Kiệt, helped realize the economic implementation of Đổi Mới, which became a major initiative to modernize Vietnam decades after the Vietnam War. It was this initiative, along with Vietnam War veterans that ultimately led U.S. President Bill Clinton to lift the U.S. embargo against Vietnam in 1994, with formal diplomatic relations taking place in 1995. Lê Văn Triết was instrumental in reintroducing Vietnam to the rest of the global economy after years of relative isolation as a result of the Vietnam War.

== Background ==
Lê Văn Triết was born into a peasant family in Trung An Commune, My Tho City, Tiền Giang, a province in Southern Vietnam on 6 June 1930. He retired from active politics on 1 January 1999, but was still supportive in local Vietnamese politics. Lê Văn Triết lived with his wife, Nguyễn Thị Lý of more than 60 years in Ho Chi Minh City, Vietnam. They have three adult children.

== Political career ==
From March to June 1946, Lê Văn Triết left his family to join the revolution and worked as Deputy Secretary of the executive committee of the National Salvation Children of Trung An Commune, Chau Thanh district in My Tho province.

From June 1946 to June 1947, he was promoted as an officer of the executive committee of the Children's National Salvation Committee of Chau Thanh district, My Tho province.

From July 1947 to July 1948, he was Liaison Officer of the Republican Guard of Tien Giang province.

From August 1948 to January 1950, he was a radio engineer at Vo Power Line of the Office of the Committee Resistance in Tien Giang Province. Lê Văn Triết was admitted as a comrade into the Communist Party of Vietnam on 31 January 1950 at the Cultural Party Cell Resistance Committee Office in My Tho Province.

March to October 1950, he was sent to study at Huynh Phan Ho Resistance High School under the Southern Education Department.

From October 1950 to 1954, Lê Văn Triết joined as a mechanical engineer for Western Military Factory 139, Party Cell member, Executive Committee member of the Labor Union.

From November to December 1954, he rallied to Northern Vietnam as Platoon Leader of Platoon II, Company II, Western Military Region.

From January to August 1955, he was promoted as Party Cell Leader, Electromechanical Repairman of the Department of Chemical Engineering Testing, under the Ministry of Industry and Trade.

From August 1955 to March 1956, Lê Văn Triết became Party Cell Leader, sent by the organization to study foreign languages at the Foreign Language School within the Ministry of Industry, as well as participating as a mechanical engineering intern in the Soviet Union.

From 1956 to January 1965, he was Assistant Technical Officer, Laboratory Secretary, Party Cell Secretary, and the Secretary of the Labor Youth Union for Vietnamese Workers.

From February 1965 to August 1966, Lê Văn Triết further ascended by becoming Party Cell Secretary, Deputy Head of the Metal Cutting Tool trainee group in the Soviet Union.

From September 1966 to June 1967, he became a Party Committee member, Party Cell Secretary, Head of the Factory's Technical Subcommittee, then Head of the Technical Department of the No. 1 Equipment Factory.

From June to August 1967, Lê Văn Triết worked on foreign trade orders and assisted the Government Economic Group working in the Soviet Union.

From September 1967 to August 1976, he gradually climbed Vietnam's Communist Party as deputy director of the Agricultural Mechanical Factory, expert advocate of the Economic Cooperation Department under the State Planning Commission. Lê Văn Triết also participated in the Economic Negotiation Delegation in Paris, France during the Paris Peace Accords in 1973. During the rest of the period, Lê Văn Triết continued his role as the deputy director of Economic Cooperation Department for the State Planning Commission.

From September 1976 to February 1982, he was promoted to Head of Department III for the Central Economic Committee of the Party and became Deputy Minister of Metallurgy and Mechanics.

As Vietnam's economy grew, Lê Văn Triết shouldered more responsibility from March 1982 to July 1991, which saw him become Vice Chairman of the People's Committee of Ho Chi Minh City, member of the Party Central Committee, a Delegate of the 8th National Assembly, and First Deputy Minister of Foreign Economic Relations.

On October 5, 1995, Lê Văn Triết gave a speech in Washington, D.C. discussing and answering questions about the recent normalization of U.S.-Vietnam relations. Vietnam was shifting, as he pointed out in the speech, "...from a centrally planned economy to a market-oriented economy under state management."

He was the Cabinet Minister of Trade during the 9th Government of the Socialist Republic of Vietnam from 1992 to 1997 under Prime Minister Võ Văn Kiệt.

Lê Văn Triết was given the task of negotiating on behalf of Vietnam with the rest of the world that the socialist country was open for foreign direct investments. He was the lead negotiator that ultimately led to the Socialist Republic of Vietnam being accepted into the ASEAN Economic Cooperation. The ultimate success of this mission culminated in Vietnam's acceptance into the World Trade Organization after 11 years of back-and-forth negotiations between Vietnam and WTO members.

Even though the U.S. embargo against Vietnam was lifted in 1994, it took nearly 11 years of negotiations with the Reagan, Bush, and Clinton Administrations before Vietnam was fully accepted into the world economy.

== Death ==
Lê Văn Triết died on 13 October 2024, at the age of 94.

With his contributions to the Party's revolutionary cause and the country's construction and development, Lê Văn Triết was awarded by the Party and the State the First Class Independence Medal, the Third Class Resistance Medal against France, the First Class Resistance Medal against the United States, the First Class Labor Medal, the National Citadel badge, the 75-Year Party Membership badge, and many medals, certificates of merit, and noble awards from the Central and local Ministries and Branches.
