= Vũ Ngọc Hải =

Vietnamese politician (1931–2025)

Minister of Industry and Trade
- In office 22 December 1987 – 13 September 1992
- Prime Minister: Phạm Hùng; Võ Văn Kiệt; Đỗ Mười; Võ Văn Kiệt
- Preceded by: position established
- Succeeded by: Thái Phụng Nê

Personal details
- Born: September 1931 Huế, Annam, French Indochina
- Died: 1 December 2025 (aged 94)
- Party: CPV
- Occupation: Engineer

Vũ Ngọc Hải (September 1931 – 1 December 2025) was a Vietnamese politician. A member of the Communist Party, he served as Minister of Industry and Trade from 1987 to 1992.

Hải died on 1 December 2025, at the age of 94.
