= Tày people =

Ethnic group in northern Vietnam

Tày
- Flag of Thô Autonomous Territory, used from 1947 to 1954.

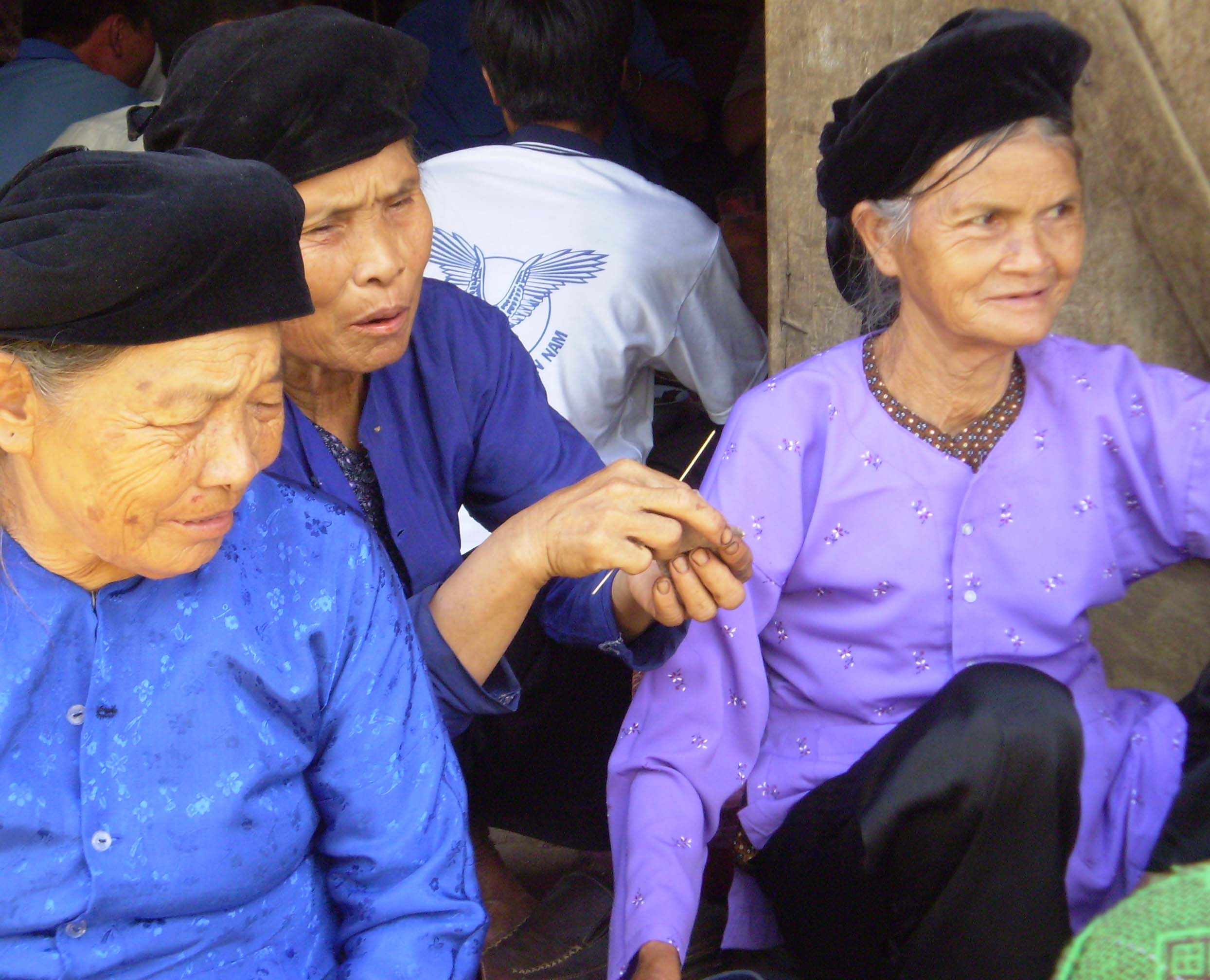
- Tày women

Total population
- 1,845,492 (2019)

Regions with significant populations
- Northern Vietnam: Cao Bằng, Lạng Sơn, Bắc Kạn, Thái Nguyên, Quảng Ninh, Bắc Ninh, Bắc Giang Provinces

Languages
- Vietnamese • Tày

Religion
- Tai folk religion (Then) and Buddhism

Related ethnic groups
- Other Tai peoples and Vietnamese

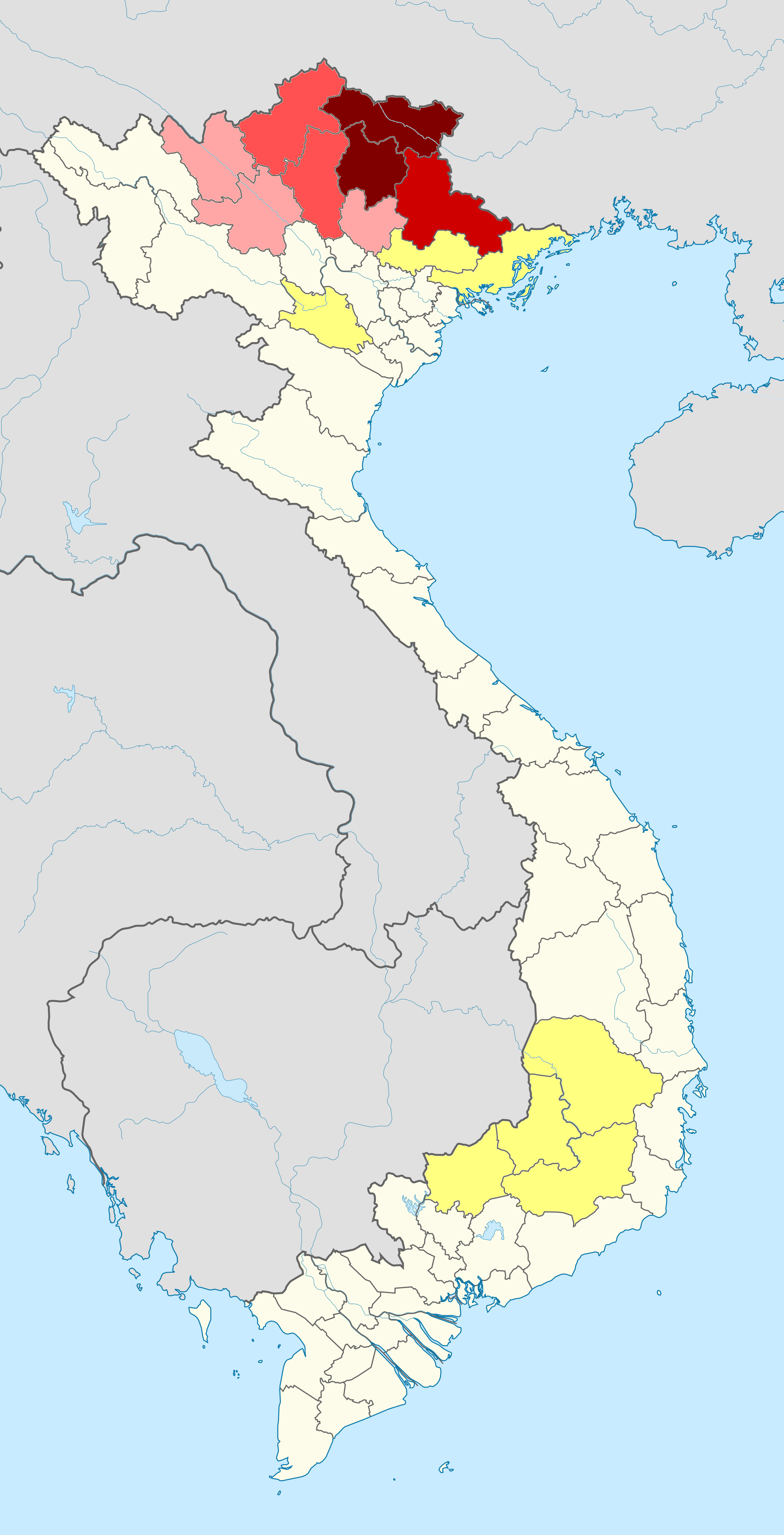
Provinces by percentage of Tày people (2009) >40% 30%–40% 20%–30% 5%–20% 1%–5% <1%

The Tày people, also known as the Thổ, T'o, Tai Tho, Ngan, Phen, Thu Lao, or Pa Di, is a Central Tai-speaking ethnic group who live in northern Vietnam. According to a 2019 census, there are 1.8 million Tày people living in Vietnam. This makes them the second largest ethnic group in Vietnam after the majority Kinh (Vietnamese) ethnic group. Most live in northern Vietnam in the Cao Bằng, Lạng Sơn, Bắc Kạn, Thái Nguyên, and Quảng Ninh provinces, along the valleys and the lower slopes of the mountains. They also live in some regions of the Bắc Ninh and Bắc Giang provinces. They inhabit fertile plains and are generally agriculturalists, mainly cultivating rice. They also cultivate maize, and sweet potato among other things.

== History ==
The Tày were once known as the Thổ people. Thổ is derived from Chinese tǔ (土), which means 'land' and 'local'. Although not inherently a pejorative it was often used as such in practice (cf. "bumpkin") in both Vietnam and China. Under the Socialist Republic of Vietnam, Thổ was deemed a pejorative and substituted with Tày.

The Tày are closely related to the Nùng people and Zhuang people, from whom they are culturally and linguistically almost indistinguishable. Although they are considered an indigenous group, portions of their population likely originated in China during the 11th and 12th centuries. However unlike the Nùng, they were more heavily Vietnamized due to their closer proximity to the Kinh and shared similar cultural practices with the Vietnamese such as lacquering their teeth black. By 1900 around 30% of their language was made of Vietnamese loan words.

Tày customs were altered greatly due to Vietnamese and Confucian patriarchal structures, however some customs persisted. Polygamy with multiple equal wives and legitimacy of issue was practiced. Marriage was preferred to occur within the clan. Young wives lived with their parents until giving birth to their first child. Tày women, like those of the Nùng and Zhuang, were said to have used poison to seek revenge when wronged.

The Tày and Nùng often intermarried, although the Tày seem to have held higher status in these relationships. Tày men married Nùng women more often than the other way around. Some Nùng groups were probably absorbed by the Tày.

== Religion ==
- Tày people
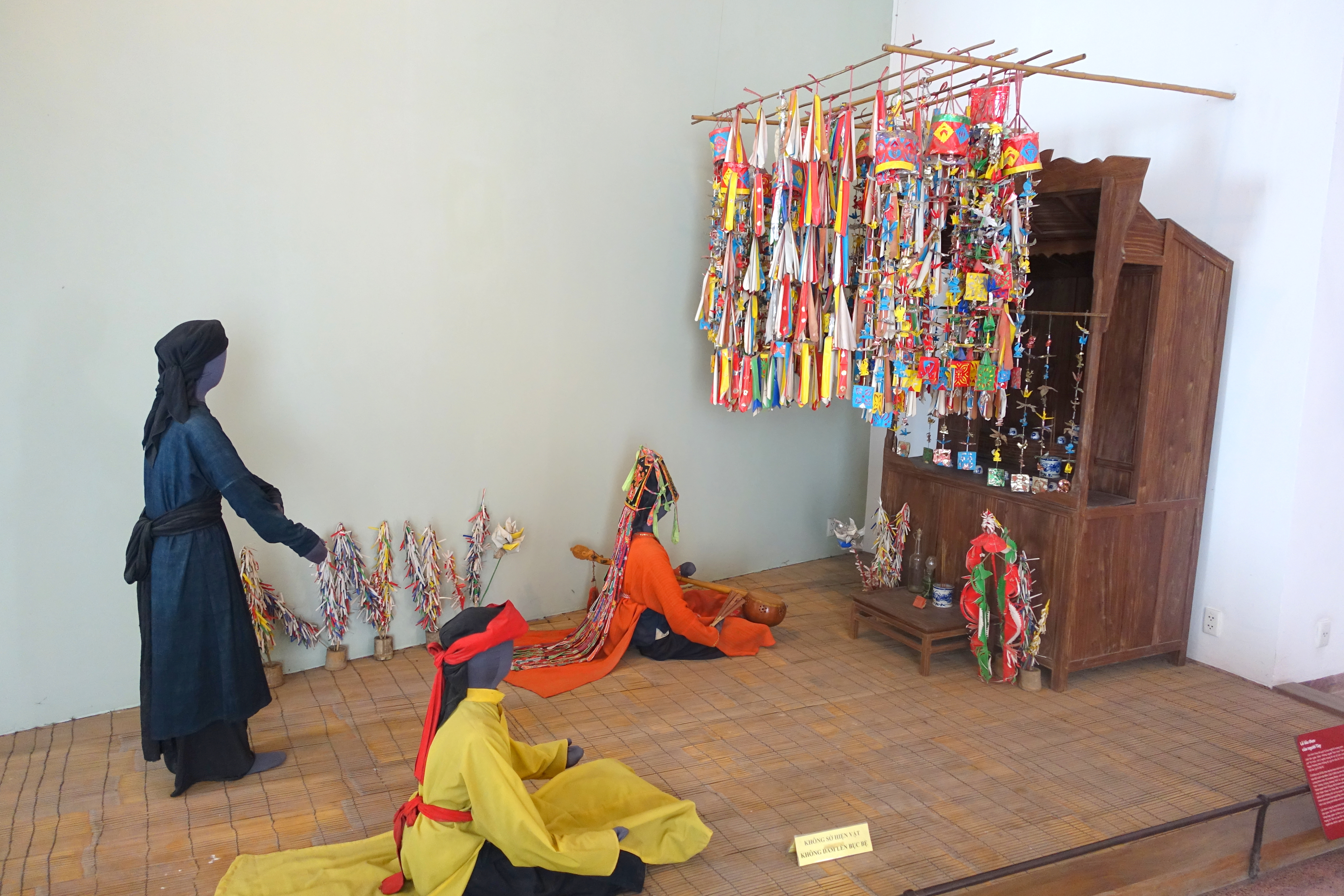
- Diorama of a then inside the Vietnam Museum of Ethnology, Hanoi
- Vietnamese alphabet: người Tày
- Hán-Nôm: 𠊚齊

The majority of the Tày practices Then, an indigenous religion involving the worship of tutelary gods, gods of the natural environment, and ancestors and progenitors of human groups. The patterns of this religion are inherited from Taoism and the Chinese folk religion: the god of the universe is the Jade Emperor, in some local traditions (for example in the Quảng Hoà district of Cao Bằng) also identified as the Yellow Emperor (Hoàng Đế). For their religious ceremonies they used to be able to recite Chinese characters but now along with the characters they use glosses because many of them can't recite anymore due to the fact that Vietnamese schools don't teach Chinese characters.

An altar for the ancestors is usually placed in a central location in the house. The altar room is considered sacred; guests and women who have given birth are not allowed to sit on the bed in front of the altar.

Some Tày have adopted Mahayana Buddhism under the influence of Vietnamese and Chinese culture.

== Language ==
Characters formerly used by the Tày people were added to Unicode in 2017. This one, U+2B86F, means "wealthy" and is romanized as giàu. It is a variant of 朝, the corresponding character in Vietnamese.

The Tày people speak the Tày language, among other Tai dialects of the Kra–Dai languages. Literacy in their own language is quite low among Tày people, probably around 5% or less. Dialects include Central Tày, Eastern Tày, Southern Tày, Northern Tày, Tày Trung Khanh, Thu Lao, and Tày Bao Lac, Tày Binh Lieu. There is a continuum of dialects to southern Zhuang in China.

== Festival ==
- Lồng tồng (literally: "Going down the rice paddy") celebrated after the New Lunar Year Festival to pray for a good harvest.
- Tăm khảu mảu (literally: "Braying the young rice") celebrated as the rice is ripening.

== Cuisine ==
- Dishes in "Slip Sli" festival (the monday of the 7th lunar month): pẻng cuội (banana cake), pẻng nhứa cáy, pẻng ngá (peanut cake), pẻng mịt, pẻng tải (literally: carrying cake)
- Pẻng rày (ant's egg cake): made from glutinous rice (Tày language: khảu), ant's black egg (Tày language: rày) and wrapped by leaves of a kind of fig (Tày language: bâu ngỏa).
- Pẻng đắng (literally: ash water cake): for Double Fifth Festival.
- Khảu thuy: is the cake for offering God and the Earth in Lồng tồng festival. Glutinous rice which is soaked in water of common water hyacinth and red flower- sandbox tree ash is mixed with taro and a kind of wine. Then, it is boiled and brayed. The next step is that it is cut into square-shaped or canarium fruit-shaped pieces and dried in the sun later. When the festival is going to come, it is fried until it is swelled. At last, it is soaked in molasses and then in fried-rice powder.
- Nà Giàng khảu sli: the glutinous cake with peanuts made in Nà Giàng, Phù Ngọc commune, Hà Quảng district, Cao Bằng Province.
- Pẻng hó: glutinous rice cake with pork and mung bean.
- Coóng phù
- Pẻng khạ (God's cake) for New Year festival.
- Khảu nua nàng tô: glutinous rice with grub for New Rice Festival on the moonday of 8th lunar month.
- Pẻng phạ: for Lồng Tồng Festival.
- Áp chao
- Pẻng chì
- Khảu slec
- Pẻng khua (smiling cake)
- Coóc mò
- Ửng sệch phàn
- Đăm đeng
- Khảu lang
- Pẻng toóc: for New Year Festival
- Pẻng cao
- Mác lịch: Trùng Khánh chestnut
- Ché khôm: Cao Bằng bitter tea: Ilex kaushue (synonym: Ilex kudingcha)
- Khau rả: Ampelopsis cantoniensis

=== Herbs ===
- Mác mật: Clausena excavata

== Music ==
- Đàn tính: is a string instrument with two or three strings. In 2019, Practices of Then by Tày, Nùng and Thái ethnic groups in Viet Nam was recognized by UNESCO as a Intangible cultural heritage.

== Tày-ized Vietnamese among the Tày ==
A part of the modern-day Tày population encompasses Tày-ized Vietnamese who live mainly in what is now Lang Son. These Tày-ized Vietnamese have their origins traced back to the Vietnamese living further south in the deltas of the Ca, Ma, and Red Rivers, e.g. Nghe An, Nam Dinh, etc. dispatched to the Sino-Annamese border by Annamese imperial governments to serve as governmental officials and local leaders (phiên thần thổ ty). These people were then forbidden to return to their home areas. Eventually they got assimilated into the indigenous Tày surrounding population. Their common surnames include Vi, Nguyễn Đình, Nguyễn Khắc, Nguyễn Công, Hoàng Đức, Hoàng Đình, etc. This practice started in the 15th century and ended in the early 20th century. Vi Văn Định is an example of these Tày-ized Vietnamese in the 20th century.

== Notable Tày people ==
- Hoàng Văn Thụ, General Secretary of the Indochina Communist Party.
- Nông Đức Mạnh, General Secretary of the Communist Party of Vietnam from April 22, 2001 to January 19, 2011.
- Hoàng Đức Triều, pen name An Định, a communist and poet, who worked with Ho Chi Minh.
- Hoàng Thị Tuân, representative in the Twelfth Vietnamese National Assembly.
- Lê Thế Khanh is likely the first Vietnamese poet writing in the Chinese language with his poem "Cố Hương Từ".
- Bế Văn Phụng, Tư Thiên Quản Nhạc Mandarin of the Mạc reign who modified Theng music into a kind of imperial music; author of lượn "Tam Nguyên".
- Nông Quỳnh Vân, author of lượn "Hồng Nhan Tứ Quý".
- Hoàng Đức Hậu, a famous poet composing the first of two parallel line of verse that nobody can't make the second one.
- Nông Quốc Chấn, a famous poet.
- Nông Văn Phách alias Vũ Lập, was part of the war against Cambodia. He was one of the most successor to guard the north border of Vietnam to prevent a Chinese invasion. However, with his skill in battles and diplomacy, he didn't need to use force but he kept the Vietnam-China border clear. He later died due to illness.
- La Văn Cầu, a military hero in the war of resistance against French colonial rule.
- Bế Văn Đàn, a military hero in the war of resistance against French colonial rule.
- Phùng Thanh Độ, a famous streamer.

== Bibliography ==
- —— (2013), Mapping the Old Zhuang Character Script: A Vernacular Writing System from Southern China, Brill, ISBN 978-9-004-22369-1.
