= List of heads of government of Vietnam =

The Prime Minister of the Government of the Socialist Republic of Viet Nam (Vietnamese: Thủ tướng Chính phủ nước Cộng hòa xã hội chủ nghĩa Việt Nam), was designated as the Chairman of the Council of Ministers (Vietnamese: Chủ tịch Hội đồng Bộ trưởng) from 1981 to 1992, is the highest office within the Central Government. The prime minister is simultaneously the Secretary of the Government Caucus Commission, a Party organ on government affairs, and Deputy Chairman of the Council for Defence and Security, an organ of the National Assembly. Throughout its history, the office has been responsible, at least in theory but not always in practice, for handling Vietnam's internal policies. Since Vietnam is a one-party state, with the Communist Party of Vietnam being the sole party allowed by the constitution, all the prime ministers of the Democratic Republic and the Socialist Republic have been members of the party while holding office. The current prime minister is Lê Minh Hưng, since 7 April 2026. He is sixth-ranked in the Political Bureau (Politburo). (Note: The Politburo of the Central Committee is the highest decision-making body of the CPV and the Central Government. The membership composition, and the order of rank of the individual Politburo members is decided in an election within the newly formed Central Committee in the aftermath of a Party Congress. The Central Committee can overrule the Politburo, but that does not happen often.)

The Office of the Prime Minister of the Socialist Republic traces its lineage back to Hồ Chí Minh, the first Prime Minister of the Democratic Republic. The office has no official connection, or lineage, to the heads of government of the former South Vietnam (with the exception of Huỳnh Tấn Phát, a communist and the last head of government of South Vietnam). Officially there have been 8 prime ministers of Vietnam, but there have been 29 prime ministers of Vietnam if the prime ministers of the Empire of Vietnam and South Vietnam are counted.

The Prime Minister is elected by the proposal of the President of Vietnam to the National Assembly and is responsible to the National Assembly, which elects all ministers to government. Activity reports by the Prime Minister must be given to the National Assembly, while the Standing Committee of the National Assembly supervises the activities of the Central Government and the Prime Minister. Finally, the deputies of the National Assembly have the right to question the Prime Minister and other members of government.

== Empire of Vietnam (1945) ==
No.	Portrait	Name (Birth–Death)	Term of office			Political party	Cabinet(s)	Ref.
No.	Portrait	Name (Birth–Death)	Took office	Left office	Time in office	Political party	Cabinet(s)	Ref.
Chief of Cabinet of the Empire of Vietnam
1		Trần Trọng Kim (1883–1953)	17 April 1945	23 August 1945	128 days	Đại Việt National Socialist Party	Kim	

== Democratic Republic of Vietnam (1945–76) ==
Status

Denotes Acting Prime Minister

No.	Portrait	Name (Birth–Death)	Term of office			Political party	Cabinet(s)	Ref.
No.	Portrait	Name (Birth–Death)	Took office	Left office	Time in office	Political party	Cabinet(s)	Ref.
Chairman of Provisional Revolutionary Government of Democratic Republic of Vietnam
1		Hồ Chí Minh (1890–1969)	2 September 1945	31 December 1945	120 days	Communist Party of Indochina	Provisional Revolutionary Government	
President of Provisional Coalition Government of Democratic Republic of Vietnam
1		Hồ Chí Minh (1890–1969)	1 January 1946	2 March 1946	60 days	Communist Party of Indochina	Provisional Unitary Government	
President of United Resistance Government of Democratic Republic of Vietnam
1		Hồ Chí Minh (Note: Huỳnh Thúc Kháng served as acting president 31 May 1946 – 21 September 1946, while Hồ Chí Minh was negotiating in France.) (1890–1969)	2 March 1946	3 November 1946	246 days	Communist Party of Indochina	National Unitary Government	
Chairman of United National Government of Democratic Republic of Vietnam
1		Hồ Chí Minh (1890–1969)	3 November 1946	20 September 1955	8 years, 321 days	Communist Party of Indochina	Minh	
1		Hồ Chí Minh (1890–1969)	3 November 1946	20 September 1955	8 years, 321 days	Worker's Party of Vietnam	Minh	
Prime Minister of the Government of the Democratic Republic of Vietnam
2		Phạm Văn Đồng (1906–2000)	20 September 1955	2 July 1976	20 years, 286 days	Worker's Party of Vietnam	Đồng I	
2		Phạm Văn Đồng (1906–2000)	20 September 1955	2 July 1976	20 years, 286 days	Worker's Party of Vietnam	Đồng II	
2		Phạm Văn Đồng (1906–2000)	20 September 1955	2 July 1976	20 years, 286 days	Worker's Party of Vietnam	Đồng III	
2		Phạm Văn Đồng (1906–2000)	20 September 1955	2 July 1976	20 years, 286 days	Worker's Party of Vietnam	Đồng IV	
2		Phạm Văn Đồng (1906–2000)	20 September 1955	2 July 1976	20 years, 286 days	Worker's Party of Vietnam	Đồng V	

== Vietnam (1976–present) ==
=== Socialist Republic of Vietnam (1976–present) ===
Status

Denotes Acting Chairman of the Council of Ministers/Prime Minister

No.	Portrait	Name (Birth–Death)	Term of office			Political party	Elected	Cabinet(s)	Ref.
No.	Portrait	Name (Birth–Death)	Took office	Left office	Time in office	Political party	Elected	Cabinet(s)	Ref.
Prime Minister of the Government of the Socialist Republic of Vietnam
1		Phạm Văn Đồng (1906–2000)	2 July 1976	18 December 1980	4 years, 167 days	Communist Party	—N/a	Đồng VI	
Chairman of the Council of Minister of the Socialist Republic of Vietnam
1		Phạm Văn Đồng (1906–2000)	18 December 1980	18 June 1987	6 years, 182 days	Communist Party	—N/a	Đồng VI	
1		Phạm Văn Đồng (1906–2000)	18 December 1980	18 June 1987	6 years, 182 days	Communist Party	—N/a	Đồng VII	
2		Phạm Hùng (1912–1988)	18 June 1987	10 March 1988 #	273 days	Communist Party	—N/a	Hùng	
—		Võ Văn Kiệt (1922–2008) acting	10 March 1988	22 June 1988	104 days	Communist Party	—N/a	Hùng	
3		Đỗ Mười (1917–2018)	22 June 1988	9 August 1991	3 years, 48 days	Communist Party	—N/a	Mười	
4		Võ Văn Kiệt (1922–2008)	9 August 1991	22 September 1992	1 year, 44 days	Communist Party	—N/a	Kiệt I	
Prime Minister of the Government of the Socialist Republic of Vietnam
4		Võ Văn Kiệt (1922–2008)	22 September 1992	25 September 1997	5 years, 3 days	Communist Party	1992	Kiệt II	
5		Phan Văn Khải (1933–2018)	25 September 1997	27 June 2006 resigned	8 years, 275 days	Communist Party	1997	Khải I	
5		Phan Văn Khải (1933–2018)	25 September 1997	27 June 2006 resigned	8 years, 275 days	Communist Party	2002	Khải II	
6		Nguyễn Tấn Dũng (born 1949)	27 June 2006	6 April 2016	9 years, 284 days	Communist Party	—	Dũng I	
6		Nguyễn Tấn Dũng (born 1949)	27 June 2006	6 April 2016	9 years, 284 days	Communist Party	2007	Dũng II	
6		Nguyễn Tấn Dũng (born 1949)	27 June 2006	6 April 2016	9 years, 284 days	Communist Party	2011	Dũng III	
7		Nguyễn Xuân Phúc (born 1954)	7 April 2016	5 April 2021	4 years, 363 days	Communist Party	2016	Phúc	
8		Phạm Minh Chính (born 1958)	5 April 2021	7 April 2026	5 years, 2 days	Communist Party	2021	Chính	
9		Lê Minh Hưng (born 1970)	7 April 2026	Incumbent	221 days	Communist Party	2026	Hưng	

== See also ==
- List of presidents of Vietnam
- List of heads of government of Vietnam
- Leaders of South Vietnam

== Bibliography ==
- Koh, David (July–August 2008). "Leadership Changes at the 10th Congress of the Vietnamese Communist Party". Asian Survey. 48 (4). University of California Press: 650–672. doi:10.1525/as.2008.48.4.650. JSTOR 3738744.
- Van, Canh Nguyen; Cooper, Earle (1983). Vietnam under Communism, 1975–1982. Hoover Press. ISBN 9780817978518.
- Woods, L. Shelton (2002). Vietnam: a Global Studies Handbook. ABC-CLIO. ISBN 9781576074169.
