= Mrs. Ngô Bá Thành =

Vietnamese lawyer, politician, and activist

Mrs. Ngo Ba Thanh
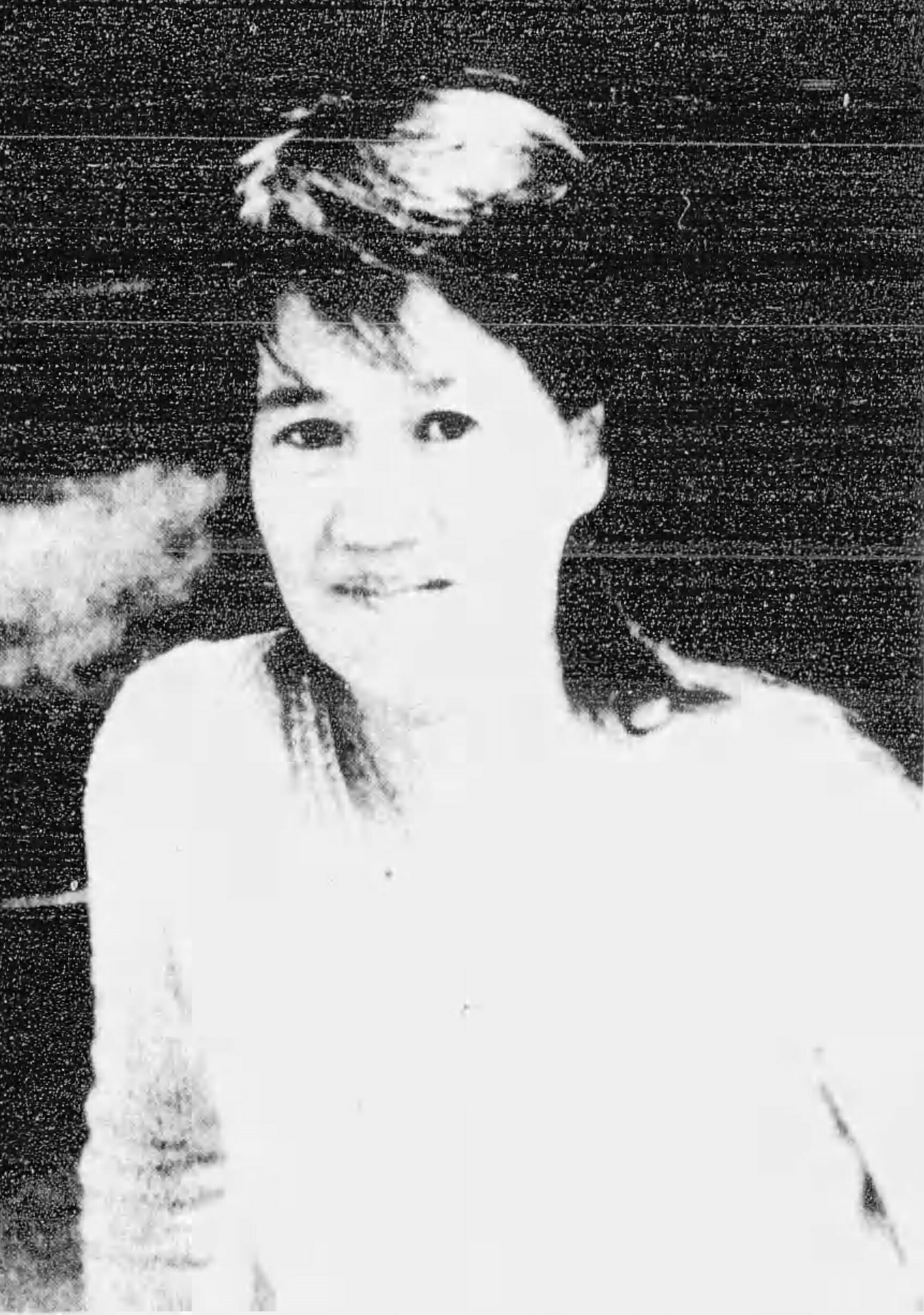
- Madame Vân in 1973
- Born: Phạm Thị Thanh Vân; 25 September 1931; Hà Tĩnh province, French Indochina
- Died: 3 February 2004 (aged 72); Hanoi, Vietnam
- Resting place: Mai Dịch Cemetery
- Education: Faculty of Law, University of Paris; Columbia Law School, Columbia University; University of Barcelona
- Occupations: Lawyer, politician, activist
- Years active: 1965–2004
- Notable work: The 1992 Constitution of Vietnam
- Political party: Independent
- Spouse: Ngô Bá Thành (m. 1949)

Member of the 10th National Assembly
- In office 1997–2002
- President: Trần Đức Lương
- Prime Minister: Phan Văn Khải
- Constituency: Hanoi

Chair of the National Assembly Laws Committee
- In office 1987–1992
- Minister of Justice: Phan Hiền [vi] (1981–1992)

Member of the National Assembly Laws Committee
- In office 1976–1987
- Minister of Justice: Phan Hiền [vi] (1981–1992); Trần Quang Huy [vi] (1980–1981); Nguyễn Ngọc Minh [vi] (1978–1979); Trần Công Tường [vi] (1972–1978)

Member of the 6th, 7th, and 8th National Assembly
- In office 1976–1992
- President: Võ Chí Công (1988-1992); Trường Chinh (1981-1988); Nguyễn Hữu Thọ (acting, 1980-1981); Tôn Đức Thắng (1976-1980)
- Prime Minister: Phạm Văn Đồng
- Constituency: Ho Chi Minh City

Mrs. or Madame Ngo Ba Thanh (Note: English sources are often in conflict about her name and often refer to her by her husband's name Ngô Bá Thành (Ba Thanh Ngo), Ba-Thanh Ngo, Ngo-Ba Thanh, or Ms. Thanh. The only source which accurately follows Vietnamese naming conventions is Van Nguyen-Marshall's Between War and the State, which uses her given name of Vân.) was the professional name of Phạm Thị Thanh Vân (25 September 1931 – 3 February 2004), a Vietnamese lawyer, politician, and anti-war and women's rights activist. Born in the northern part of French Indochina, she married at 18 and completed her legal studies at the University of Paris, Columbia University, and the University of Barcelona. Returning to South Vietnam in 1963 during the Vietnam War, she first worked as the chief legal advisor to Ngo Dinh Diem's administration. After his assassination, she became a professor of law at Saigon University and was active in the feminist and peace movements.

Vân's vocal opposition to the policies of President Nguyễn Văn Thiệu led to surveillance by the Republic of Vietnam National Police and numerous arrests. In 1970, she founded the Vietnamese Women's Movement for the Right to Live, an anti-war neutralist movement which supported neither the US-backed government in the south nor the northern communist regime. Using her wide international contacts with groups such as the Women's International League for Peace and Freedom (WILPF) and Women Strike for Peace, Vân brought international attention to the social and economic issues created by the war, which increased international opposition to the conflict. As a member of the Third Force Movement and vice president of the Vietnamese People's Front Struggling for Peace, she pressed for demobilization, an immediate withdrawal of American troops and funding for the South Vietnamese government, and creation of a democratic society.

After the defeat of South Vietnam by the North Vietnamese in 1975, Vân became one of the few non-communists who were elected to the unified National Assembly of Vietnam. She served four terms in office and during her tenure assisted in the creation of the 1980 and 1992 Constitutions and in revisions to the legal code. She was chair of the Law Reform Committee from 1987 to 1991 and served as vice president of the Vietnam Lawyers Association. She was also the Southeast Asia executive representative for WILPF, having been elected to the post in 1989. Vân wrote publications evaluating Vietnamese law and legal systems and was recognized internationally for both her legal expertise and activism.

== Early life and education ==
Phạm Thị Thanh Vân was born on 25 September 1931, in Tùng Ảnh commune in the Đức Thọ district of Hà Tĩnh province in French Indochina, to Phạm Văn Huyến and his wife. Her father was one of the first veterinarians in the country who had been trained under the French regime. Although he qualified for a teaching post at the University of Indochina in Hanoi, as her father was an indigenous Vietnamese, he instead was sent to a rural area to practice veterinary medicine. She was raised in an affluent intellectual family, along with her brother and five sisters. Vân attended a private Catholic school in Da Lat, where she was one of the only two Vietnamese students – the other pupils were all children of French officials or the monarch Bảo Đại. When World War II ended, the family returned to Hanoi and her father became head of veterinary science at the university. Both her mother and her brother died during the war to end French rule.

At the age of 18, Vân entered into an arranged marriage with Ngô Bá Thành and had her first child, quickly followed by another. (Note: Scholar Heather Marie Stur states that she did not marry until 1950, after she had moved to Paris in 1949.) As she was overwhelmed with raising the children yet wanted to study, her family sent Vân and her family to study in Paris. Thành pursued courses in veterinary medicine, while Vân earned her baccalaureate from the University of Paris. The family expanded to include two more children. To support the family, she took courses in shorthand and typing and worked at night to make enough money for them to live. Because many students needed to work and could not attend classes, Vân used her shorthand to make note of the lectures of her professors and then typed them out and sold them to her classmates. She also competed in a stenography competition, taking the top prize. In 1954, when the Viet Minh took over North Vietnam, her father fled south to Saigon, and served as a government minister. She continued her studies abroad, earning a doctorate with honors in comparative law from the Faculty of Law of Paris in 1957 and was awarded the Henri Lévy-Ullmann scientific prize. When offered a scholarship to continue her studies at Columbia Law School, Vân moved to the United States in 1958.

== Career ==
=== Early career (1959–1963) ===
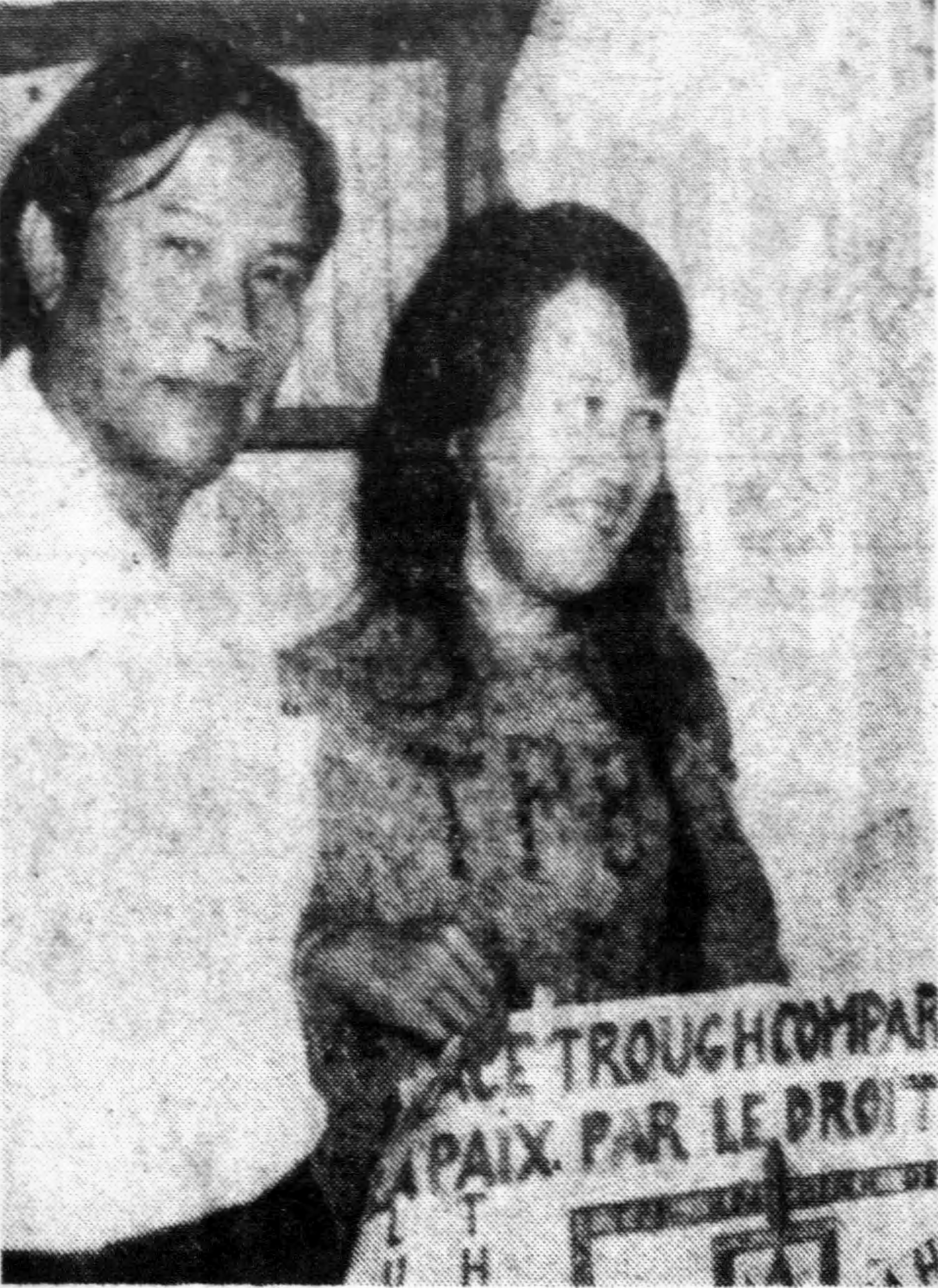
Ba Thanh Ngo and Vân with protest posters

After completing her LL.M at Columbia in 1959, (Note: Stur states that Vân graduated from Columbia in 1961, but newspaper accounts indicate she graduated and left the United States in 1959.) Vân returned to Europe and taught briefly at the International University of Comparative Law, headquartered in Luxembourg and Strasbourg, while researching legal systems in Latin America. Because her husband could not find a job, he returned to Saigon, while she continued with her studies and her family cared for her children in Paris. Vân then resigned and moved to Spain, completing a doctorate in corporate law at the University of Barcelona in 1962. She was offered a directorship at the International University of Comparative Law. Because of her fluency in English, French, and Spanish, another offer was for a position at the United Nations Office of Legal Affairs, department of international law by Secretary-General of the United Nations Dag Hammarskjöld.

Vân turned down both offers and in 1963 returned to Vietnam, despite the on-going war, hoping to use her education to help the country. She was hired as the chief judicial advisor in the administration of Ngo Dinh Diem, president of South Vietnam. When Diem was assassinated at the end of the year, she helped found the Comparative Law Institute at Saigon University Institute and its journal The Asian Comparative Law Review. She served as head of the institute and began to work in the peace movement. Embracing the feminist movement and believing that international cooperation would lead to understanding and eliminate oppression, Vân founded the International Women's Association of Saigon and became its president. The organization cultivated membership through ambassadors' wives in order to bring international women together.

=== Activism (1964–1974) ===
As Vân was fluent in English and French, she was invited to participate in diplomatic meetings between 1964 and 1965. At one meeting hosted by the British Embassy to discuss Operation Rolling Thunder, she was asked by experts including the ambassadors Gordon Etherington-Smith (UK) and Henry Cabot Lodge Jr. (USA), and the military experts Sir Robert Grainger Ker Thompson (UK) and General William Westmoreland (USA), if the bombing strategy would be effective. She advised them that it was likely to have the opposite effect, turning people toward communism. Ignoring her advice and proceeding with the bombing raids led Vân to become a relentless protester against the policies of the government of South Vietnam and "American imperialists". She was arrested in early 1965 along with her father, who led the Committee for Peace, and Trương Như Tảng, leader of the National Self-Determination Group. Her father was deported to North Vietnam in March, and she and Trương were given suspended sentences in August. (Note: In 1996 her father fled to Cambodia and then moved to Paris in 1970.) As a result of her arrest, both Vân and her husband, who was the director of the Saigon Fishery Service, lost their jobs. After participating in a protest at Saigon University, she was arrested again in 1966 and spent two years in prison. She was held for 25 months without trial before being released.

In 1969, Vân resigned the presidency of the International Women's Association of Saigon to found an organization for women peace activists. After attending a seminar which presented testimony from women throughout South Vietnam about rapes and other violence perpetrated against women and children because of the war, Vân announced the formation of the Ủy Ban Phụ Nữ Đòi Quyền Sống (Vietnamese Women's Committee for the Right to Live). She urged women to work for reconciliation, peace, and the eradication of violence. Within five months, the name was changed to the Vietnamese Women's Movement for the Right to Live, and became one of the founding member organizations of the Mặt Trận Nhân Dân Đấu Tranh vì Hoà Bình (Vietnamese People's Front Struggling for Peace), for which Vân became a vice president.

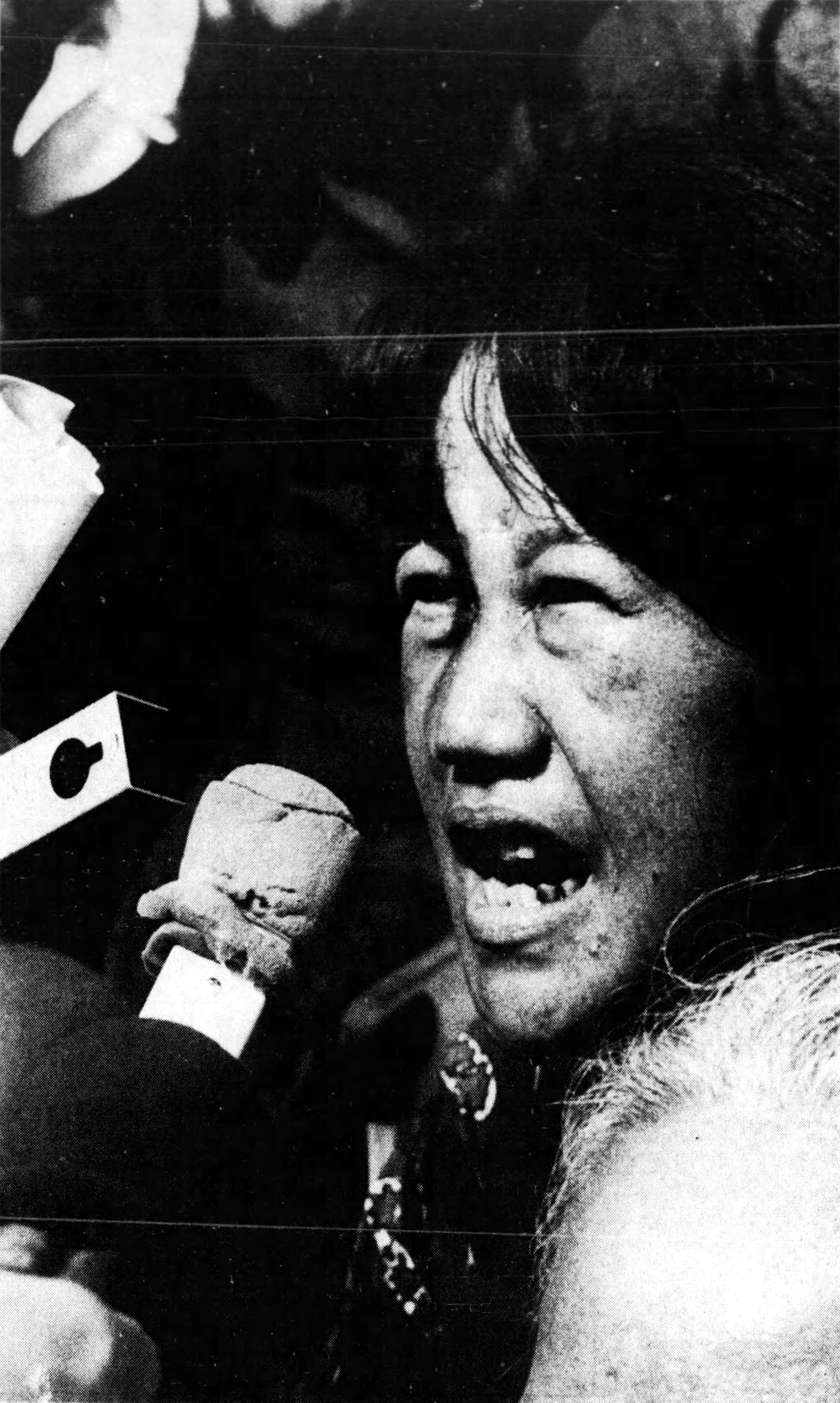
Vân, speaking as president of the Women's Right to Live, 1971

The Women's Right to Live quickly became an umbrella association uniting women from various other groups within the framework of the Lực Lượng Thứ Ba (Third Force Movement). The Third Force coalition, which was both anti-war and anti-communist, worked towards a democratic post-war solution with improved socio-political rights and protections. The Women's Right to Live was the only women-led peace organization in the country and one of the most active groups involved the Third Force, uniting women across all social classes, age groups, and beliefs. Vân was neither a communist nor a supporter of the Thiệu regime. She argued for an immediate withdrawal of American troops and a pledge from the United States to provide post-war economic support to rebuild the country. She pushed for a unified democratic government which followed a neutral system aligned neither with capitalism nor communism.

To further the aims of the Women's Right to Live, Vân and the organization's membership built alliances with international women's groups, such as the Women's International League for Peace and Freedom (WILPF) and Women Strike for Peace, writing letters to influential policy-makers and activists to increase awareness of the impacts of the war. WILPF sent a delegation of members to meet with Vân and members of the Women's Right to Live. She personally wrote to the Foreign Relations Committee of the United States Senate, giving details of how the war was causing problems for women and children and urging Congress to stop funding the war and the South Vietnamese government. The group organized programs to visit hospitals, orphanages, prisons and to assist war victims. They also held public rallies and publicized the social problems created by the war such as war orphans, mixed-race children, prostitution, victims of napalm bombings, and general deprivations and spread of disease. President Thiệu, interpreting their actions as dangerous to his regime, ordered troops to turn the women away and threaten to destroy their facilities.

By 1971, Vân was followed continuously by the national police, who also photographed and followed the people she contacted. She was arrested in July 1971 for lodging a complaint at the Supreme Court when it was announced that no opposition to Thiệu would be allowed to run in the upcoming election. Although she was released, she was arrested again in September for a protest outside the National Assembly of the Republic of Vietnam and charged with disturbing the peace and illegal association. It was also alleged that she had assaulted a judge, but witnesses verified that he merely stumbled. Held for two years without trial, she spent much of her time in solitary confinement, but continued to write letters to policy-makers. The only time Vân was called to a military tribunal, in March 1972, she collapsed from an asthma attack and the trial was postponed.

Struggles with asthma and lumbago, which led to partial paralysis of her right leg, resulted in Vân's move to a prison hospital in April 1973. She staged a five-month hunger strike, losing 44 pounds (20 kg). Radical feminist and US congresswoman Bella Abzug flew to Vietnam and brought her case to the attention of the US legislature and President Richard Nixon, who made an appeal for her release. The US WILPF section and other branches of WILPF International contacted US House members and wrote letters to Nixon to secure Vân's release. Newspapers reported that Thiệu agreed to her release in 1973 because of fear that the publicity would stop the flow of US funding.

Although WILPF members had secured offers for a guest professorship at Columbia University and Bryn Mawr College following her release, Vân was doubtful that she would be permitted to leave the country. She decided that she needed to remain in Vietnam to work for peace. Despite the lack of recognition by the Thiệu government, the Third Force was recognized as an equal participant in the Paris Peace Accords negotiations. Surveillance by the national police resumed and in October 1973 she was attacked by two unknown men, who she thought were policemen. Vân met frequently with foreign correspondents, giving over 110 interviews over the next 15 months. She resumed her international correspondence with the aim of keeping alive ties between the Women's Right to Live and WILPF. Among the numerous programs she spearheaded was a successful campaign for WILPF members to monitor political prisoners through an adopt-an-inmate program. She continued to press for a political solution to end the war because, despite the US troop withdrawal, neither of the combatants was willing to lose strength and initiate demobilization. North Vietnamese troops continued to have a presence in Saigon and Thiệu continued to suppress dissidents and refused to abide by the terms of the peace agreement. This ultimately led to the Fall of Saigon.

=== Politics (1975–2002) ===
After the defeat of South Vietnam by the North Vietnamese in April 1975, plans for reunification moved swiftly. The first elections for a united National Assembly of Vietnam since 1946 were held in April 1976 and, as one of the few non-communists, Vân was elected to the 492-member body. She saw her role as a member of the opposition, providing checks and balances to the government. She refused to join the communist or socialist party. In her first term, she served on the committee to draft the 1980 Constitution. Vân was a member of the legislative Law Reform Committee during the 1981 to 1986 term and was chair of the Law Reform Committee from 1987 to 1991. She was also vice president of the Vietnam Lawyers Association. In 1989 at the 24th WILPF Congress, she was elected as the executive representative for Southeast Asia.

Vân was one of the architects of the 1992 Constitution of Vietnam, which expanded economic rights. She facilitated legal reforms in the country and through her publications provided links for Vietnam and the West. Her published works, such as the chapter "The 1992 Constitution and the Rule of Law" in Vietnam and the Rule of Law (1993) evaluated Vietnamese law and legal systems from a historical and cultural perspective, contrasting the various rights and the political structure with those of other nations. In 1992, she was assigned as a candidate for a district in Ho Chi Minh City in which she was likely to have little support and lost her seat. Within months, she joined the Fund for Assistance to Women's Innovation as a vice president. The organization was sponsored by the government and focused on developing projects to expand the social and scientific roles of women and work with legislators to draft policies to facilitate growth. Vân was elected to her final legislative term in 1997, serving through 2002.

== Death and legacy ==
Vân died on 3 February 2004 in Hanoi, and was buried on 7 February in the Mai Dịch Cemetery. According to author George J. Veith, she was one of the "most-known radical dissident[s] in South Vietnam" and obtained global attention. She was a controversial figure and her relationship with the Vietnamese government was contentious. The historian An Thuy Nguyen stated this resulted from the state policy to rewrite history in order to downplay the contributions of non-communists. Some of the Vietnamese diaspora believed she was on a quest for fame, whereas others felt that by working in the socialist government, Vân had turned her back on the ideals of the Third Force Movement's fight against war and communism.

Lưu Văn Đạt, the General Secretary and Vice President of the Vietnam Lawyers Association acknowledged that Vân's work on the law committee of the Vietnamese National Assembly was critically important. She was elected four times and her terms were marked by criticism of the government's lack of socio-economic freedoms and failure to provide adequate justice structures. The Women's Right to Live was one of the most influential organizations in the Vietnamese peace movement. (Note: Stur stated, that the "Women's Right to Live organization never attracted more than a few dozen members, and [Vân] failed to generate enough interest to establish chapters in the provinces". This information is directly contradicted by historians An Thuy Nguyen who stated that the organization united 36 women's groups and had chapters in all the major South Vietnamese cities like Đà Nẵng and Huế, and Van Nguyen-Marshall, who states that the organization had its headquarters in Saigon, and established local branches in places such as Cần Thơ, Chợ Lớn province, and Gia Định province. Further, Nguyen describes the importance of the group and Nguyen-Marshall said that Women's Right to Live activists could be found everywhere, rallying for various socio-political causes.) Unlike other feminist groups of the time or in Vietnam's past, the organization maintained its autonomy from political alliances and cultivated diversity of members across a wide spectrum of society, giving women a means of pressing for representation, self-determination, and peace. Its alliance with international women's groups helped to gain support abroad for an end to the war.

== Selected works ==
- Ngô, Bá Thành (Mrs.) (1962). L'originalité du droit vietnamien et la réception des droits étrangers au Vietnam: Droit chinois au début de l'Ère Chrétienne et droit français au XIXè siècle [The Originality of Vietnamese Law and the Reception of Foreign Rights in Vietnam: Chinese Law at the Beginning of the Christian Era and French Law in the 19th Century] (PhD) (in French). Paris, France: University of Paris II. OCLC 264678628.
- Ngô, Bá Thành (Mrs.) (1963). La sociedad anónima familiar: ante la ley española de 1951 [The Family Public Corporation: Before the Spanish Law of 1951] (in Spanish). Barcelona: Editorial Hispano Europea. OCLC 876700714.
- Ngô, Bá Thành (Mrs.) (1964). De quelques applications du droit comparé; droit international et relations internationales, droit commercial, droit civil, droit public [Some Applications of Comparative Law: International Law and International Relations, Commercial Law, Civil Law, Public Law] (in French). Saigon, Vietnam: Institut de droit comparé du Viet-Nam. OCLC 23472865.
- Ngô, Bá Thành (Mrs.), ed. (1974). The Women, Architects of Peace: Contribution to the 19th Triennial Congress of the Women's International League for Peace and Freedom on Peacemaking – Key to the Future. Saigon, South Vietnam: Vietnamese People's Front Struggling for Peace. OCLC 4428153.
- Ngô, Bá Thành (Mrs.) (January 1985). "Le Droit á l'Égalité des Femmes á la Lumière du Drôit Positif de la République Socialiste du Vietnam et dans les Faits" [The Right to Equality of Women in the Light of the Positive Rights of the Socialist Republic of Vietnam and in Facts]. Bulletin de droit (in French).
- Ngô, Bá Thành (Mrs.) (1993). "4. The 1992 Constitution and the Rule of Law". In Thayer, Carlyle A.; Marr, David G. (eds.). Vietnam and the Rule of Law (PDF). Canberra, ACT: Australian National University. pp. 81–115. ISBN 978-0-7315-1852-4.
- Ngô, Bá Thành (Mrs.) (1996). "Influence of Buddhism on Ancient Vietnamese Law and Role of Comparative Law in Contemporary Juridical Science". Vietnam Law and Legal Forum. 24. Hanoi, Vietnam: Vietnam News Agency: 27–28. ISSN 0868-3972.
