= Communist Party of Vietnam =

Sole legal party of Vietnam

Communist Party of Vietnam Đảng Cộng sản Việt Nam
- Abbreviation: CPV; ĐCS / ĐCSVN
- Governing body: Central Committee
- General Secretary: Tô Lâm
- Executive Secretary: Trần Cẩm Tú
- Founder: Hồ Chí Minh
- Founded: 3 February 1930; 96 years ago; renamed as Indochinese Communist Party (October 1930)
- Merger of: Communist Party of Indochina; Communist Party of Annam; Communist League of Indochina; People's Revolutionary Party (1976)
- Headquarters: 1A, Hùng Vương Street, Ba Đình, Hanoi
- Newspaper: Nhân Dân
- Think tank: Central Theoretical Council
- Student wing: Vietnam National Union of Students
- Youth wing: Ho Chi Minh Communist Youth Union
- Women's wing: Vietnam Women's Union
- Pioneer organization: Ho Chi Minh Young Pioneer Organization
- Armed wing: Vietnam People's Armed Forces
- Union affiliation: Vietnam General Confederation of Labour
- Membership (2026): ▲5,600,000+
- Ideology: Communism; Marxism–Leninism; Ho Chi Minh Thought
- Political position: Far-left
- National affiliation: Vietnamese Fatherland Front
- International affiliation: IMCWP
- Colors: Red
- Slogan: Đảng Cộng sản Việt Nam quang vinh muôn năm! (Long live the glorious Communist Party of Vietnam!)
- Anthem: "The Internationale" (Vietnamese version)
- National Assembly: 482 / 500

Party flag

The Communist Party of Vietnam (CPV), (Note: Vietnamese: Đảng Cộng sản Việt Nam pronounced [ɗâŋ kôŋ͡mˀ ʂân viə̂tˀ nām]; abbr. ĐCSVN.) also known as the Vietnamese Communist Party (VCP), is the sole legal party of the Socialist Republic of Vietnam (SRV). Founded in 1930 by Ho Chi Minh, the CPV dominantly established the government of the Democratic Republic of Vietnam (DRV) before becoming the ruling party in 1954 after the First Indochina War and practically all of Vietnam (SRV) in 1975 after the Vietnam War.

Although it nominally exists alongside the Vietnam Fatherland Front, it maintains a unitary government and has centralized control over the state, military, and media. The supremacy of the CPV is guaranteed by Article 4 of the national constitution. The Vietnamese public generally refer to the CPV as simply "the Party" (Đảng) or "our Party" (Đảng ta).

The CPV is organized on the basis of democratic centralism, a principle conceived by Russian Marxist revolutionary Vladimir Lenin. The highest institution of the CPV is the party's National Congress, which elects the Central Committee (CC). The CC is the supreme organ on party affairs in between party congresses. After a party congress, the CC elects the Politburo and Secretariat, and appoints the general secretary, the highest party office. In between sessions of the CC, the Politburo is the supreme organ on party affairs. However, it can only implement decisions based on the policies which have been approved in advance by either the CC or the party's National Congress. As of 2026, the 14th Politburo has 19 members.

After World War II, the party, operating through its Viet Minh front, overthrew the monarchy and purged its political rivals. During the Cold War, through its power as the ruling party of the Democratic Republic of Vietnam (DRV), it fought against the French Union, the United States, and the Western-aligned State of Vietnam and Republic of Vietnam from 1949 to 1975. The DRV was aligned with the Soviet Union, China, and other Eastern-bloc allies. After taking power in all of Vietnam, the party officially unified the country as the Socialist Republic in 1976. The party had implemented a command economy in North Vietnam and later all of Vietnam since 1954, before introducing economic reforms, known as Đổi Mới, in 1986. The party is currently known for its advocacy of what it calls a "socialist-oriented market economy" and Ho Chi Minh Thought.

While continuing to officially hold to Marxism–Leninism, some independent analysts have argued that the party's ideological framing shifted following the introduction of the Đổi Mới in 1986, moving from a strict emphasis on classical class struggle toward performance-based economic legitimacy. At the 10th National Party Congress in 2006, the CPV formally amended its statutes to allow party members to engage in private business activities, defining its role as representing the interests of "the working class, the working people, and the entire nation". The party continues to uphold Marxism–Leninism, with state-owned enterprises still dominating over the "commanding heights" of the economy through State-Owned Enterprises (SOEs) in strategic sectors such as energy, telecommunications, and banking, alongside a centralized state bureaucracy The CPV maintains fraternal ties with global left-wing movements and regularly attends the annual International Meeting of Communist and Workers' Parties (IMCWP). In 1988, the party became the sole political party in Vietnam when it absorbed its two sister parties, the Socialist Party and the Democratic Party. Domestically and internationally, the party's one-party governance structure faces political opposition from the Vietnamese democracy movement and anti-communists, especially groups among the Vietnamese diaspora.

== History ==
=== Rise to power (1925–1945) ===
The Communist Party of Vietnam traces its history back to 1925, when Nguyen Ai Quoc (later Ho Chi Minh) established the Vietnamese Revolutionary Youth League (Hội Việt Nam Cách mạng Thanh niên),

The Youth League's goal was to end the colonial occupation of Vietnam by France. The group sought national independence and the redistribution of land to working peasants. The Youth League's purpose was to prepare the masses for a revolutionary armed struggle against the French occupation. His efforts in laying the groundwork for the party was financially supported by the Comintern.

In 1928 the headquarters of the Youth League in Guangdong, China, were destroyed by the Kuomintang and the group was forced underground. This led to a national breakdown within the Youth League, which indirectly led to a split. On 17 June 1929, more than 20 delegates from cells throughout the Tonkin region held a conference in Hanoi, where they declared the dissolution of Youth League and the establishment of a new organization called the Communist Party of Indochina. The other faction of the League, based in the Cochinchina, held a conference in Saigon and declared themselves the Communist Party of Annam in late 1929.

The two parties spent the rest of 1929 engaged in polemics against one another in an attempt to gain a position of hegemony over the radical Vietnamese liberation movement.

A third Vietnamese communist group which did not originate from the Youth League emerged around this time in the Annam, calling itself the Communist League of Indochina. The Communist League of Indochina had its roots in another national liberation group which had existed in parallel with the Youth League, and saw itself as a rival to the latter.

The Communist Party of Indochina and Communist Party of Annam, together with individual members of the Communist League of Indochina, merged to form the modern Communist Party of Vietnam, founded by Ho Chi Minh in Kowloon, Hong Kong, from 3 February 1930.

At a later conference, per the request of the Comintern, the party changed its name to the Indochinese Communist Party (ICP). During its first five years of existence, the ICP attained a membership of about 1,500 and had a large contingent of supporters. Despite the group's small size, it exerted a huge influence in the nation's turbulent social climate. Consecutive poor harvests in 1929 and 1930, coupled with an onerous debt burden, drove many peasants to radicalism.

In the industrial center of Vinh, International Workers' day demonstrations were organized by ICP activists, which gained critical mass when the families of the semi-peasant workers joined the demonstrations to express their dissatisfaction with the economic circumstances they faced.

As three May Day marches grew into mass rallies, French colonial authorities moved in to quash what they perceived to be dangerous peasant revolts. Colonial forces fired upon the crowds, killing dozens and enraging the population. In response, revolutionary councils were organized in villages in an effort to govern themselves locally. Repression by the colonial authorities began in the autumn of 1931; around 1,300 people were eventually killed by the French colonialists and many more were imprisoned or deported as imperial authority was reasserted and the ICP was effectively wiped out in the region.

General Secretary Tran Phu and a number of CC members were arrested or killed. Lê Hồng Phong was then assigned by the Comintern to restore the movement. The party was restored in 1935, and he was elected as its second general secretary. A year later, Hà Huy Tập was appointed general secretary instead, who returned to the country to restore the CC. In the mid 1930s, the party was forced publicly to abandon much of its opposition to French colonialism as Soviet leader Joseph Stalin cared more about strengthening a left-inclined government in France.

Ho Chi Minh was also removed from the party leadership in the early 1930s. He was criticized within the organization and by the Comintern for his use of nationalism as a means to attain national independence.

The French colonial apparatus in Vietnam was disrupted during World War II. The fall of France to Nazi Germany in June 1940 and the subsequent collaboration of Vichy France with the Axis powers served to delegitimize French claims of sovereignty. The European war made colonial governance from France impossible and Indochina was occupied by Japanese forces. As a result, the revolutionaries also sought the opportunity to establish a grassroots organization throughout most of the country.

At the beginning of the war, the ICP instructed its cadres to go into hiding in the rural provinces. Despite this, more than 2,000 party members, including many of its leaders, were arrested. Party activists were particularly hard hit in the southern region of Cochinchina, where the previously strong organization was wiped out by arrests and killings.

After an uprising in Cochinchina in 1940, most of the CC, including Nguyễn Văn Cừ (4th general secretary) and Hà Huy Tập, were arrested and executed; Lê Hồng Phong was deported to Côn Đảo and later left to die. A new party leadership, which included Trường Chinh, Phạm Văn Đồng, and Võ Nguyên Giáp emerged. Together with Ho Chi Minh, these revolutionaries would provide a unified leadership over the next four decades.

Ho Chi Minh returned to Vietnam in February 1941 and established a military-political front known as the League for the Independence of Vietnam, commonly known as the Viet Minh. The Viet Minh was a mass organization that included many political parties, military militias, religious organizations and other factions that sought independence. However, the Viet Minh was heavily influenced by the leadership of the ICP.

It earned popular recognition and legitimacy as the fiercest anti-Japanese fighting force, positioning itself perfectly for the brewing political vacuum. Despite its position as the core of the Viet Minh, the ICP comprised only a minority throughout the war, with an estimated membership of between 2,000 and 3,000 in 1944.

In May 1945, the Viet Minh broke away from the Viet Cach, a pro-Chinese nationalist exile group they had joined after its founding in 1942. No longer under its banner, they began conducting independent operations across the Tonkin provinces bordering China.

=== Left opposition ===
The party, particularly in the south, was rivalled by other nationalist and left-wing groups, notably Trotskyist organizations. In November 1931, dissidents emerging from within the party formed the October Left Opposition around the clandestine journal Tháng Mười.

These included Hồ Hữu Tường and Phan Văn Hùm who, protesting a leadership of "Moscow trainees", had formed an Indochinese group within the Communist League (Liên Minh Cộng Sản Đoàn), the French section of the International Left Opposition, in Paris in July 1930. Once considered "the theoretician of the Vietnamese contingent in Moscow",

Tường was calling for a new "mass-based" party arising directly "out of the struggle of the real struggle of the proletariat of the cities and country". Tường was joined in endorsing Leon Trotsky's doctrines of "proletarian internationalism" and of "permanent revolution" by Tạ Thu Thâu of the Annamite Independence Party.

Rejecting (in the wake of the Shanghai massacre) the Comintern's "Kuomintang line", Thâu argued against a nationalist accommodation with the indigenous bourgeoisie and for immediate "proletarian socialist revolution".

Recognizing the Trotskyists' relative strength in organizing Saigon's factories and waterfront, the ICP cells in the city maintained a unique pact with the Trotskyists for four years in the mid-1930s. The two groups published a common paper, La Lutte, and presented joint "workers' lists" for Saigon municipal and colonial-council elections.

In August 1945, the Trotskyists joined other non-communist factions in demanding arms to fight the French. Shortly after, under the direction of Tran Van Giau, their former collaborators systematically hunted down and eliminated them, a fate shared by large numbers of Caodaists, independent nationalists and their families.

=== First Indochina War (1945–1954) ===
In March 1945, Imperial Japan overthrew the French colonial regime in Indochina, and the Vietnamese Emperor Bao Dai declared nominal "independence." However, by August 1945, Japan had surrendered to the Allies. Taking advantage of the power vacuum, the Viet Minh launched a nationwide uprising, leading to Bao Dai's abdication on the 25th.

Ho Chi Minh later became Chairman of the Provisional Government (Prime Minister) on 28 August 1945 and issued a Proclamation of Independence of the Democratic Republic of Vietnam on September 2. Although the Viet Minh convinced Emperor Bảo Đại to abdicate, the government was not yet recognized by any nation.

Ho Chi Minh repeatedly petitioned President Harry Truman for support for Vietnamese independence, citing the Atlantic Charter, but Truman did not respond due to his anti-communist stance. After the successful establishment of an independent government in Hanoi, Vietnam was occupied by Kuomintang forces in the north and Anglo-French forces in the south of the 16th parallel.

Amid mounting encirclement by Allied forces and domestic opposition in November 1945, the ICP was officially dissolved and was downgraded to the "Institute for Studying Marxism in Indochina". In reality, the party still operated clandestinely. However, this did not eliminate tensions between communists and nationalists inside the Viet Minh.

The First Indochina War between the Viet Minh and France broke out in late 1946, ending their negotiations. In practice, the Viet Minh became the leading force in the struggle against the colonialists and their anti-communist sympathizers. After being recognized by the People's Republic of China and the USSR in January 1950, the Viet Minh demonstrated a stance of class struggle of Marxist theory by implementing land reforms and redistribution.

According to the United States' Central Intelligence Agency (CIA), membership in the Viet Minh grew to about 400,000 members by 1950. In 1951, during the war for independence, the officially dissolved Indochinese Communist Party was re-established and renamed the Worker's Party of Vietnam. At the same time, the Viet Minh merged with other progressive forces to create Lien Viet.

Although the Soviet leadership was initially displeased with the Viet Minh’s ideological compromises, such as their displays of neutrality, party concealment, and lack of land reform, global geopolitics soon overrode these domestic grievances. In June 1949, the Soviets strongly opposed France’s creation of the anti-communist State of Vietnam within the French Union. This solidified a rigid Cold War divide, with China aiding the Viet Minh and the United States bankrolling the French Union.

At Stalin's urging, the Vietnamese revolutionaries implemented land reform in 1953 under the Chinese model and the supervision of Chinese advisors, despite not having yet defeated the French. This radical domestic restructuring took place amidst intense mobilization, as the war against French Union forces ground on until July 1954, concluding just two months after the resounding Vietnamese victory at the Battle of Điện Biên Phủ.

Following the 1954 Geneva Conference, Vietnam was partitioned at the 17th parallel, leaving communist revolutionaries in control of the north. Even before the war ended, Marxist ideologues argued that the party's focus on national independence had overshadowed its core mission of class struggle. To realign the party, they launched a internal purge to promote cadres with proletarian backgrounds over veteran resistance leaders whose authority stemmed from fighting the French. Initiated in some areas in 1953, this campaign peaked in impact between 1955 and 1956.

=== Vietnam War (1955–1975) ===
At the second party congress in 1951, it was decided that the ICP would be split into three; one party for each nation of Vietnam, Laos and Cambodia. However, in an official note it said that the "Vietnamese party reserves the right to supervise the activities of its fraternal parties in Cambodia and Laos".

The Khmer People's Revolutionary Party was established in 1951 and the Lao People's Party was formed four years later in 1955. The third party congress, held in Hanoi in 1960, formalized the tasks of constructing socialism in North Vietnam, and committed the party to the "liberation" of southern Vietnam.

In the south, the United States supported an anti-communist state, the Republic of Vietnam, successor of the State of Vietnam, established in October 1955. In 1960, North Vietnam established a political front in the south called the National Liberation Front of Southern Vietnam.

The Vietnam War was a critical Cold War flashpoint fought between two opposing coalitions. On one side was the socialist alliance of North Vietnam and the NLF; on the other was the anti-communist South Vietnam, heavily supported by the United States, Australia, South Korea, and Thailand.

The north Vietnamese received support from the People's Republic of China and the Soviet Union. As the war expanded regionally, Cambodia and Laos were pulled into their own civil conflicts. In Cambodia, the Khmer Rouge and GRUNK fought to overthrow the pro-American Khmer Republic, while in Laos, the communist Pathet Lao battled the U.S.-backed Kingdom of Laos.

The Cambodian and Laotian communists received training and support from the North Vietnam and NLF. During the war the Worker's Party of Vietnam also established its sub-branch in the south called the People's Revolutionary Party of South Vietnam, which aimed to lead the NLF.

After the withdrawal of American troops from South Vietnam and later the collapse of South Vietnam on 30 April 1975, Vietnam was de facto unified under the leadership of the revolutionaries and the south was under the leadership of the Provisional Revolutionary Government of the Republic of South Vietnam (PRG), leading to formal reunification under the Socialist Republic on 2 July 1976.

At the fourth party congress in December 1976, the Workers' Party of Vietnam merged with the People's Revolutionary Party of South Vietnam to create the Communist Party of Vietnam with its original name in 1930. The party explained that the merger and name change was made in light of the "strengthened the proletarian dictatorship, the development of the leadership of the working class ... a worker-peasant alliance".

=== Ruling party (1976–present) ===
Party emblem sometimes seen on certificates of merit given out by the CPV's internal organizations

The fourth party congress comprised 1,008 delegates who represented 1,553,500 party members, an estimated three % of the Vietnamese population. A new line for socialist construction was approved at the congress, the Second Five-Year Plan (1976–1980) was approved and several amendments were made to the party's constitution. The party's new line emphasized building socialism domestically and supported socialist expansion internationally.

The party's economic goal was to build a strong and prosperous socialist country in 20 years. The economic goals set for the Second Five-Year Plan failed to be implemented, and a heated debate about economic reform took place between the fourth and fifth party congresses.

The first was at the sixth CC plenum of the fourth party congress in September 1979, but the most revealing one occurred at the tenth CC plenum of the fourth party congress which lasted from 9 October to 3 November 1981. The plenum adopted a reformist line but was forced to moderate its position when several grassroot party chapters rebelled against its resolution. At the fifth party congress, held in March 1982, General Secretary Lê Duẩn said the party had to strive to reach two goals; to construct socialism and to protect Vietnam from Chinese aggression, but priority was given to socialist construction.

The party leadership acknowledged the failures of the Second Five-Year Plan, claiming that their failure to grasp the economic and social conditions aggravated the country's economic problems. The Third Five-Year Plan (1981–1985) emphasized the need to improve living conditions and the need for more industrial construction, but agriculture was given top priority. Other points were to improve the deficiencies in central planning, improve economic trade relations with the COMECON countries, Laos and Kampuchea.

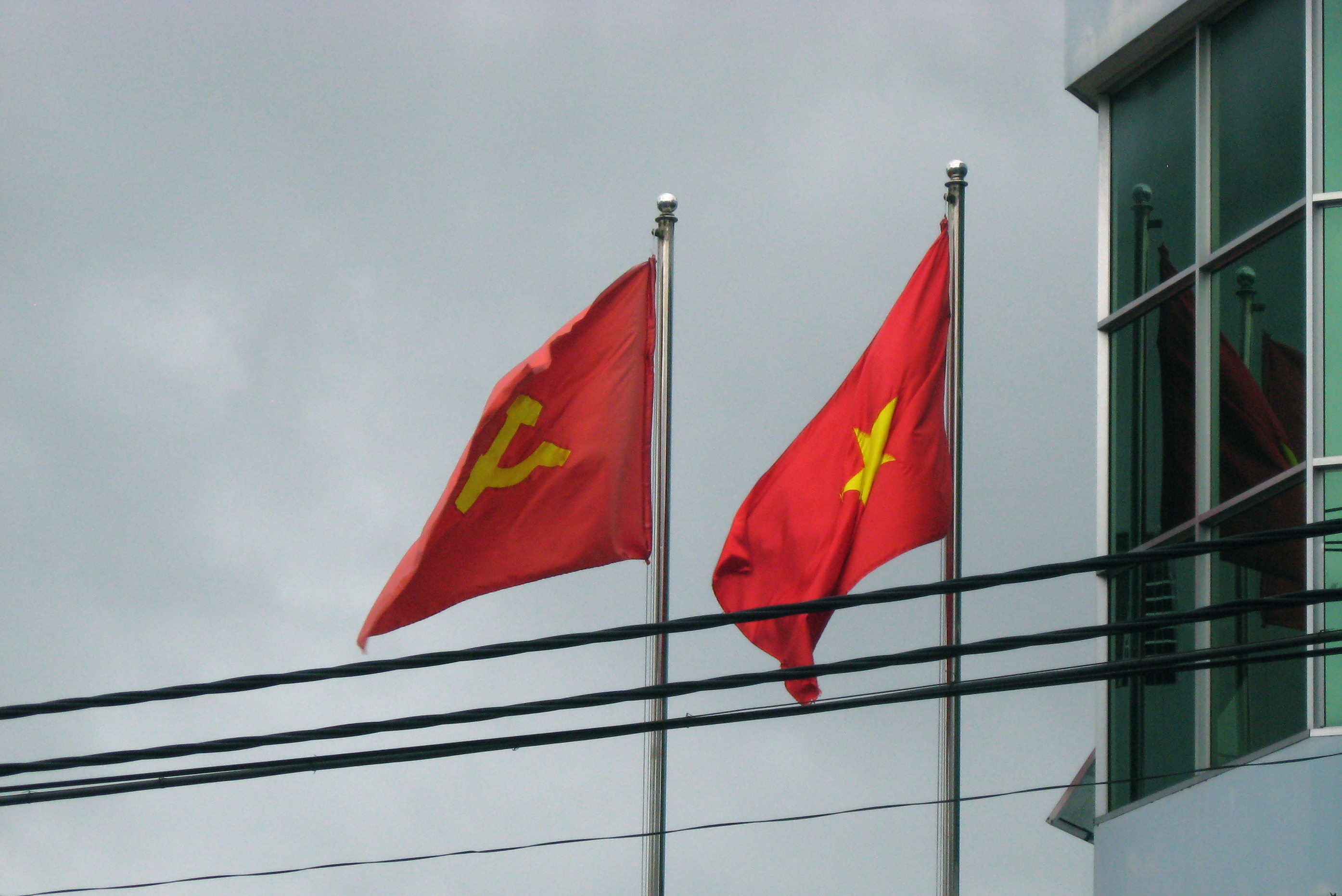
The flag of the CPV and the national flag of Vietnam flying side by side

While Lê Duẩn continued to believe in the goals set in the Third Five-Year Plan, leading members within the Communist Party were losing their trust in the system. It was in this mood that the 1985 price reform was introduced—market prices were introduced, which led to a sudden increase in inflation. By 1985, it became apparent that the Third Five-Year Plan had failed miserably.

Attacks against the interests of the well-to-do were part of the Marxist ideas of class struggle. The majority of the educated came from well-off families, and the middle and upper classes held education and abilities that were critical to the country's prosperity, but the Communist Party's attitude toward those groups has frequently hampered their effective use of their education and skills. As a result, Vietnam's most pressing needs, such as the rebuilding of a shattered economy and the establishment of long-term economic development, had largely gone unfulfilled. The Communist Party's personnel lacked the skills to tackle these issues, and the communists' monopolization of power made it impossible for those who did have the skills to put them to use in the decade following the war's end. Vietnam was one of the poorest countries in the world during Lê Duẩn's rule.

Lê Duẩn died on 10 July 1986, a few months before the sixth party congress. A Politburo meeting held between 25 and 30 August 1986, paved the way for more radical reforms; the new reform movement was led by Trường Chinh. At the sixth party congress, Nguyễn Văn Linh was elected the new general secretary – this was a victory for the party's old guard reformist wing. The new leadership elected at the Congress would later launch Đổi Mới and establish the framework for the socialist-oriented market economy. The economic reforms were initiated alongside a relaxation of state censorship and freedom of expression. The Chinese Communist Party praised the CPV's economic and political reforms, which continued into the early 2000s.

At the seventh party congress in which Nguyễn Văn Linh retired from politics, he reaffirmed the party's and country's commitment to socialism. Đỗ Mười succeeded Nguyễn Văn Linh as general secretary, Võ Văn Kiệt, the leading reformist cadre, was appointed prime minister and Lê Đức Anh, was appointed president. In 1994, four new members were appointed to the seventh Politburo, all of whom opposed radical reform.

At the June 1997 CC meeting, both Lê Đức Anh and Võ Văn Kiệt confirmed their resignations to the ninth National Assembly, which was dissolved in September. Phan Văn Khải was approved as Võ Văn Kiệt's successor, and the relatively unknown Trần Đức Lương succeeded Lê Đức Anh as president. At the fourth CC plenum of the eighth party congress, Lê Khả Phiêu was elected general secretary and Đỗ Mười, Lê Đức Anh and Võ Văn Kiệt officially resigned from politics and were elected Advisory Council of the CC. Nông Đức Mạnh succeeded Lê Khả Phiêu in 2001 as general secretary.

Nông Đức Mạnh held the top spot until the 11th National Congress in 2011, when he was succeeded by Nguyễn Phú Trọng. Trong is seen as a conservative and closer to China. In 2021, General Secretary of the Communist Party Nguyễn Phú Trọng was re-elected for his third term in office, becoming Vietnam's most powerful leader in decades. However, in July 19th, 2024, Nguyễn Phú Trọng suddenly died while in office.

After the death of Nguyễn Phú Trọng, Tô Lâm took the office as the acting general secretary. On August 3, 2024, Tô Lâm was elected unanimously as the 13th general secretary of the party during the 9th extraordinary plenary session of the 13th National Congress.

== Organization ==
=== National Congress ===
The National Congress is the party's highest organ, and is held once every five years. Delegates decide the direction of the party and the Government at the National Congress. The CC is elected, delegates vote on policies and candidates are elected to posts within the central party leadership.

After decisions taken at the National Congress are ratified, the congress is dissolved. The CC implements the decisions of the National Congress during the five-year period between congresses. When the CC is not in session, the Politburo implements the policies of the National Congress.

=== Central Committee ===
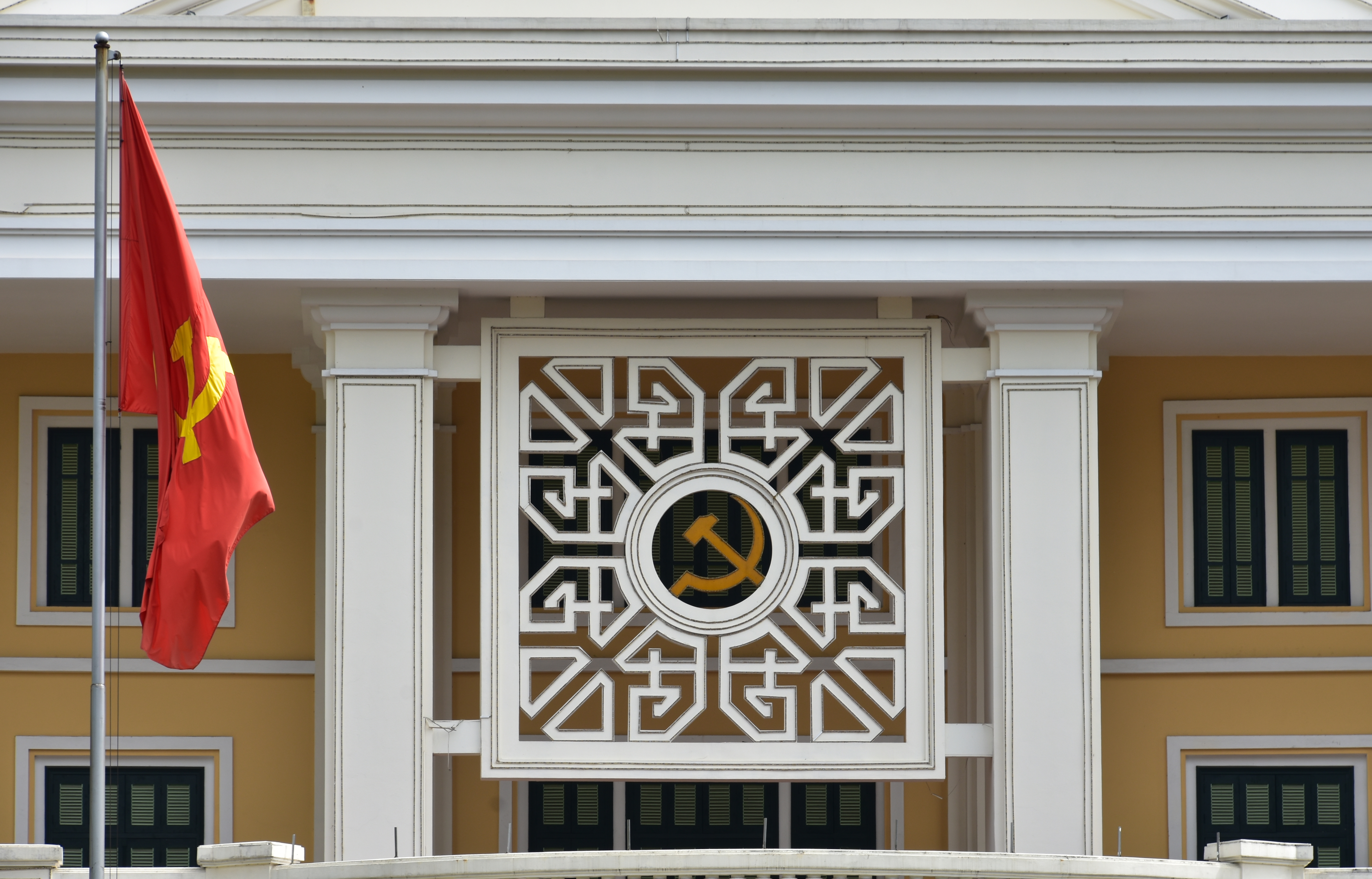
CPV's emblem and flag in front of the Party's CC headquarters.

The CC is the CPV's most powerful institution. It delegates some of its powers to the Secretariat and the Politburo when it is not in session. When the Vietnam War ended in 1975, the Vietnamese leadership, led by Lê Duẩn, began to centralize power. This policy continued until the sixth National Congress, when Nguyễn Văn Linh took power. Linh pursued a policy of economic and political decentralization.

The party and state bureaucracy opposed Linh's reform initiatives; because of this, Linh tried to win the support of provincial leaders, causing the powers of the provincial chapters of the CPV to increase in the 1990s. The CPV lost its power to appoint or dismiss provincial-level officials in the 1990s; Võ Văn Kiệt tried to wrestle this power back to the centre during the 1990s without success.

Because of these changes, power in Vietnam has become increasingly devolved. The number of CC members with a provincial background increased from 15.6% in 1982 to 41% in 2001. Because of the devolution of power, the powers of the CC have increased substantially; for example, when a two-thirds majority of the Politburo voted in favour of retaining Lê Khả Phiêu as General Secretary, the CC voted against the Politburo's motion and voted unanimously in favour of removing him from his post of General Secretary.

The CC did this because most of its members had a provincial background, or were working in the provinces. These members were the first to be affected when the economy began to stagnate during Lê Khả Phiêu's rule. The CC elects the Politburo in the aftermath of the Party Congress.

==== General Secretary ====
The General Secretary of the CC is the highest office within the Communist Party, is elected by the CC, and can remain in post for two five-year terms. The general secretary presides over the work of the CC, the Politburo, the Secretariat, is responsible for issues such as defence, security and foreign affairs, and chairs meetings with important leaders. The general secretary holds the post of Secretary of the Central Military Commission, the party's highest military affairs organ.

Before 1991, there was significantly greater concentration of power in the General Secretary. After the revised constitution was adopted in 1992, power was practically more distributed between the General Secretary, the President, and the Prime Minister, under a semi-codified leadership collectivity system known as the Four Pillars.

==== Politburo ====
The Politburo is the highest organ of the Communist Party between CC meetings, which are held twice a year. The Politburo can implement policies which have been approved by either the previous Party Congress or the CC. It is the duty of the Politburo to ensure that resolutions of the Party Congress and the CC are implemented nationally. It is also responsible for matters related to organization and personnel, and has the right to prepare and convene a CC plenary session.

The Politburo can be overruled by the CC, as happened in 2001 when the Politburo voted in favor of retaining Lê Khả Phiêu as general secretary; the CC overturned the Politburo's decision, dismissed Lê from politics, and forced the Politburo to elect a new general secretary after the ninth National Congress.

The members of the Politburo are elected and given a ranking by the CC immediately after a National Party Congress. According to David Koh, the Politburo ranking from the first plenum of the 10th CC onwards is based upon the number of approval votes by the CC. Lê Hồng Anh, the Minister of Public Security, was ranked second in the 10th Politburo because he received the second-highest number of approval votes. Tô Huy Rứa was ranked lowest because he received the lowest approval vote of the 10th CC when he stood for election to the Politburo.

The 11th Politburo was elected by the CC after the 11th National Congress and consists of 16 members. Decisions within the Politburo are made through collective decision-making.

Since 10th CC, the duties and responsibilities of the members of the Politburo and those of the General Secretary, President, Prime Minister, the Chairman of the National Assembly and the Permanent member of the Secretariat have been specified separately.

==== Secretariat ====
The Secretariat is headed by the general secretary and decisions within it are made through collective decision-making. The Secretariat is elected and the membership size is decided by the CC immediately after the National Congress. It is responsible for solving organizational problems and implementing the demands of the CC.

The Secretariat oversees the work of the Departments of the CC. It is also responsible for inspecting and supervising the implementation of resolutions and directives on fields regarding the party on economic, social, defence, security and foreign affairs, and it is directly responsible for the coordination of a number of party bodies. The Secretariat supervises the preparation for issues raised at Politburo meetings.

==== Central Military Commission ====
The Central Military Commission is appointed by the Politburo and includes members from the military. The commission is responsible to the CC and between meetings, the Politburo and the Secretariat. The Secretary of the Central Military Commission is the party's general secretary while the post of deputy secretary is held by the Minister of National Defence. The commission can issue guidelines on military and defence policies, and has leadership in all aspects of the military. The General Political Department is subordinate to the commission.

==== Central Inspection Commission ====
The Central Inspection Commission is the party organ responsible for combating corruption, disciplining members and wrongdoing in general. It is the only organ within the party which can sentence or condemn party members. The Commission, and its chairman and deputy chairmen, are elected by the first plenum of the CC after a National Party Congress. Due to the party's policy of democratic centralism, a local inspection commission can only investigate a case if the inspection commission directly superior to it consents to the investigation.

==== Central Theoretical Council ====
The Central Theoretical Council was established on 22 October 1996 by a decision of the CC. The 4th Central Theoretical Council was formed on 7 September 2016, and is currently headed by Politburo member Đinh Thế Huynh. It functions as an advisory body to the CC, the Politburo and the Secretariat on conceiving and developing party theory in line with Marxism. It is responsible for studying topics put forth by the Politburo and the Secretariat, and topics set forth by its own members.

== Ideology ==
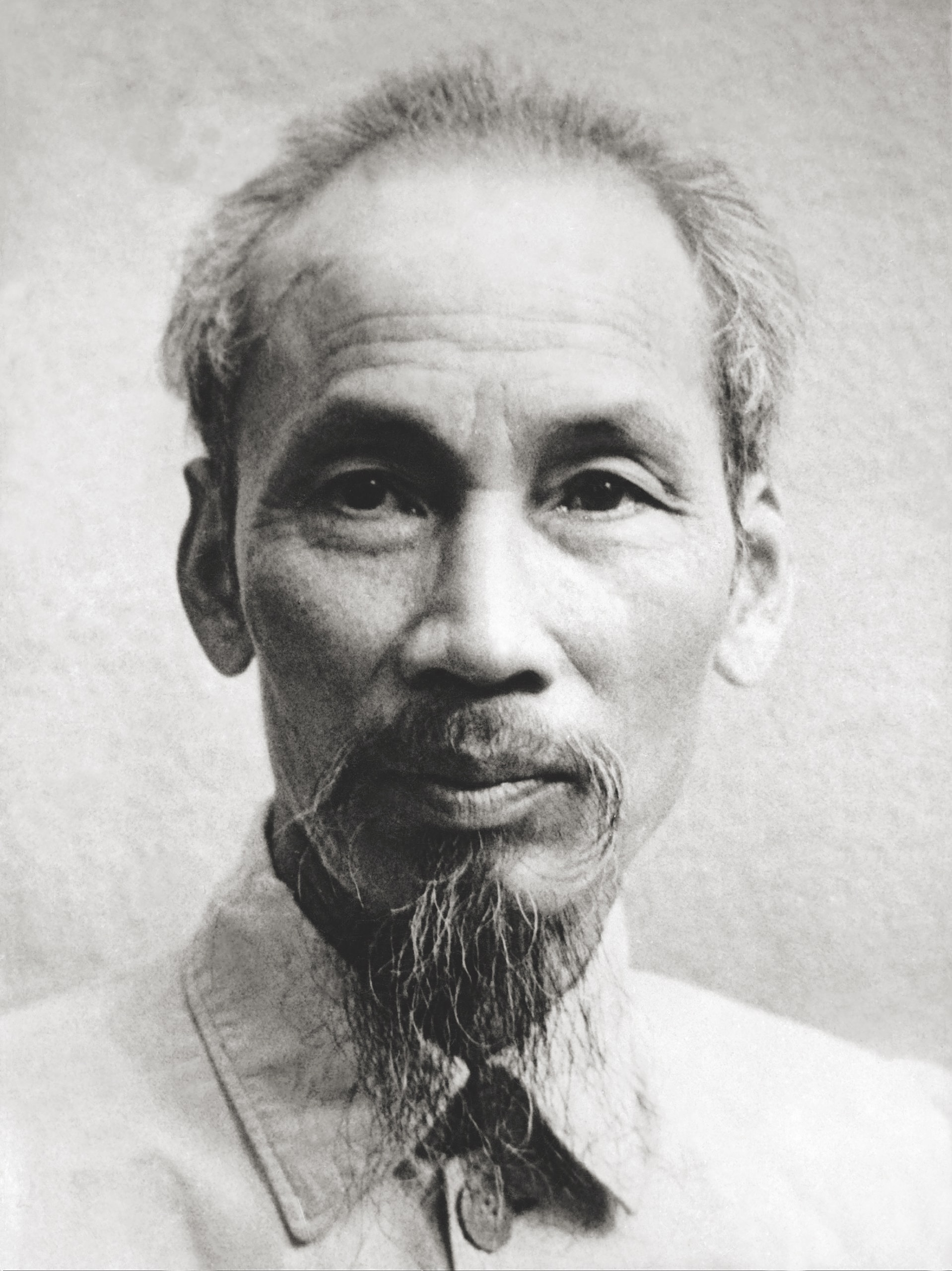
The state and party are guided by the ideas of Ho Chi Minh

Vietnam is a socialist republic with a one-party system led by the Communist Party. The CPV espouses Marxism–Leninism and Ho Chi Minh Thought, the ideologies of Ho Chi Minh.

The two ideologies serve as guidance for the activities of the party and state. According to the Constitution, Vietnam is in a period of transition to socialism. Marxism–Leninism was introduced to Vietnam in the 1920s and 1930s, and Vietnamese culture has been led under the banners of patriotism and Marxism–Leninism.

Ho Chi Minh's beliefs were not systematized during his life, nor did this occur quickly following his death. Trường Chinh's 1973 biography of Ho Chi Minh emphasized his revolutionary policies. The thoughts of Ho Chi Minh were systematized in 1989 under the leadership of Nguyễn Văn Linh. Ho Chi Minh Thought and Marxism–Leninism became the official ideologies of the CPV and the state in 1991.

The CPV's claim to legitimacy was retained after the collapse of communism elsewhere in 1989 and the dissolution of the Soviet Union in 1991 by its commitment to the thoughts of Ho Chi Minh, according to Sophie Quinn-Judge. According to Pierre Brocheux, the current state ideology is Ho Chi Minh Thought, with Marxism–Leninism playing a secondary role.

Some claim that Ho Chi Minh Thought is used as a veil for a party leadership that has stopped believing in communism, but others rule this out on the basis that Ho Chi Minh was an avid supporter of Vladimir Lenin and the dictatorship of the proletariat. Still others see Ho Chi Minh Thought as a political umbrella term whose main function is to introduce non-socialist ideas and policies without challenging socialist legality.

Marxism–Leninism has lost its ideological stronghold in Vietnamese politics since the introduction of a mixed economy in the late 1980s and 1990s. Because of the Đổi Mới reforms, the party could not base its rule on defending only the workers and the peasants, which was officially referred to as the "working class-peasant alliance".

In the constitution introduced in 1992, the State represented the "workers, peasants and intellectuals". In recent years, the party has stopped representing a specific class, but instead the "interests of the entire people", which includes entrepreneurs. The final class barrier was removed in 2006, when party members were allowed to engage in private activities.

In the face of de-emphazising the role of Marxism–Leninism, the party has acquired a broader ideology, laying more emphasis on nationalism, developmentalism and becoming the protector of tradition. Ho Chi Minh himself stated that what originally attracted him to communism was not its doctrines, which he did not at that time understand, but the simple fact that the communists revolutionaries supported the independence of colonies like French Indochina.

=== Transition to socialism ===
Characters of a new social regime were formed in Ho Chi Minh's thoughts through, first of all, the method of transforming features of old regime into its contrary facets. It was the dialectical thinking method. According to this method, the process of formulating the people's democratic regime in reality was considered the process of wiping out comprehensively fundamental features of colonial-feudal regime.

— Lai Quoc Khanh explaining Ho Chi Minh's way of thinking.

Ho Chi Minh Communist Youth Union in 2014

According to Ho Chi Minh, before it becomes socialist, a society must evolve through national liberation and the construction of a people's democratic regime. While national liberation is the means of taking power, the establishment of a people's democratic regime requires the total destruction of the feudalist, colonialist and imperialist society.

Only through this destruction can Vietnam transit to socialism. Lai Quoc Khanh, a journalist in the theoretical Tạp chí Cộng Sản wrote: "The people's democratic regime is an objective necessity in the development course of Vietnamese society". A people's democratic regime, however, is not a socialist regime. For instance, in a people's democratic regime private ownership still exists, while in a communist stage of development, ownership does not exist. Vietnamese communists consider the distribution of land during Ho Chi Minh's early rule as an example of people's democracy.

However, this is not the only difference. The logic is that difference in the ownership of productions lead to different modes of production. Ho Chi Minh said that the basic economic tenets of a people's democratic regime was state ownership of certain segments of production—considered socialist since the state belongs to the people, cooperatives, which were half-socialist in nature but would develop into fully socialist economic entities, and the personal economics of individual handicraft and peasantry, which would later develop into cooperatives, private capitalism and state capitalism, where the state shares capital with capitalists to develop the country further.

Since these economic basics relied on different types of ownership, the economy of the people's democratic regime cannot be considered socialist, hence the regime is not socialist. For example, in the socialist-oriented market economy, the state-owned sector will be the dominant sector, hence the socialist character of the economy dominates. The political platform of the second party congress held in 1951 stated: "The people's democratic revolution is neither an old-type capitalist democratic revolution nor socialist revolution, it is a new-type capitalist democratic revolution which will evolve into socialist revolution without experiencing a revolutionary civil war."

To be more specific, the people's democratic regime is a substage in capitalist development. While Ho Chi Minh supported the position that Vietnam had entered the stage of transition to socialism in 1954, he held the belief that Vietnam was still "a democratic regime in which people are the masters" and not socialist.

To reach the socialist stage of development, the development of the state sector was of utmost importance—the lack of which according to Ho Chi Minh would lead to failure. The platform of the 11th National Congress held in January 2011 stated: "This is a profound and thorough revolutionary process and a complicated struggle between the old and the new for qualitative changes in all aspects of social life. It is essential to undergo a long period of transition with several steps of development and several mixed social and economic structures".

According to the party's General Secretary Nguyễn Phú Trọng, during the transition to socialism, socialist factors of development compete with non-socialist factors, which include capitalist factors. Nguyễn said: "Along with positive aspects, there will always be negative aspects and challenges that need to be considered wisely and dealt with timely and effectively.

It is a difficult struggle that requires spirit, fresh vision, and creativity. The path to socialism is a process of constantly consolidating and strengthening socialist factors to make them more dominant and irreversible. Success will depend on correct policies, political spirit, leadership capacity, and the fighting strength of the Party".

=== "Superiority of socialism" ===
There has never been a scientific and revolutionary theory than Marxism–Leninism. It is a 'comprehensively and logically tight theory which gives people a total world view' and a theory that not only aims at 'understanding the world, but also changing it'. ... Capitalism will certainly be replaced by socialism, because that is the law of human history, which no one can deny.

— Nguyễn Văn Linh, the leader who initiated Đổi Mới, opposed the view that fundamental principles of Marxism–Leninism were to be changed, or rejected because of the introduction of market-elements into the economy.

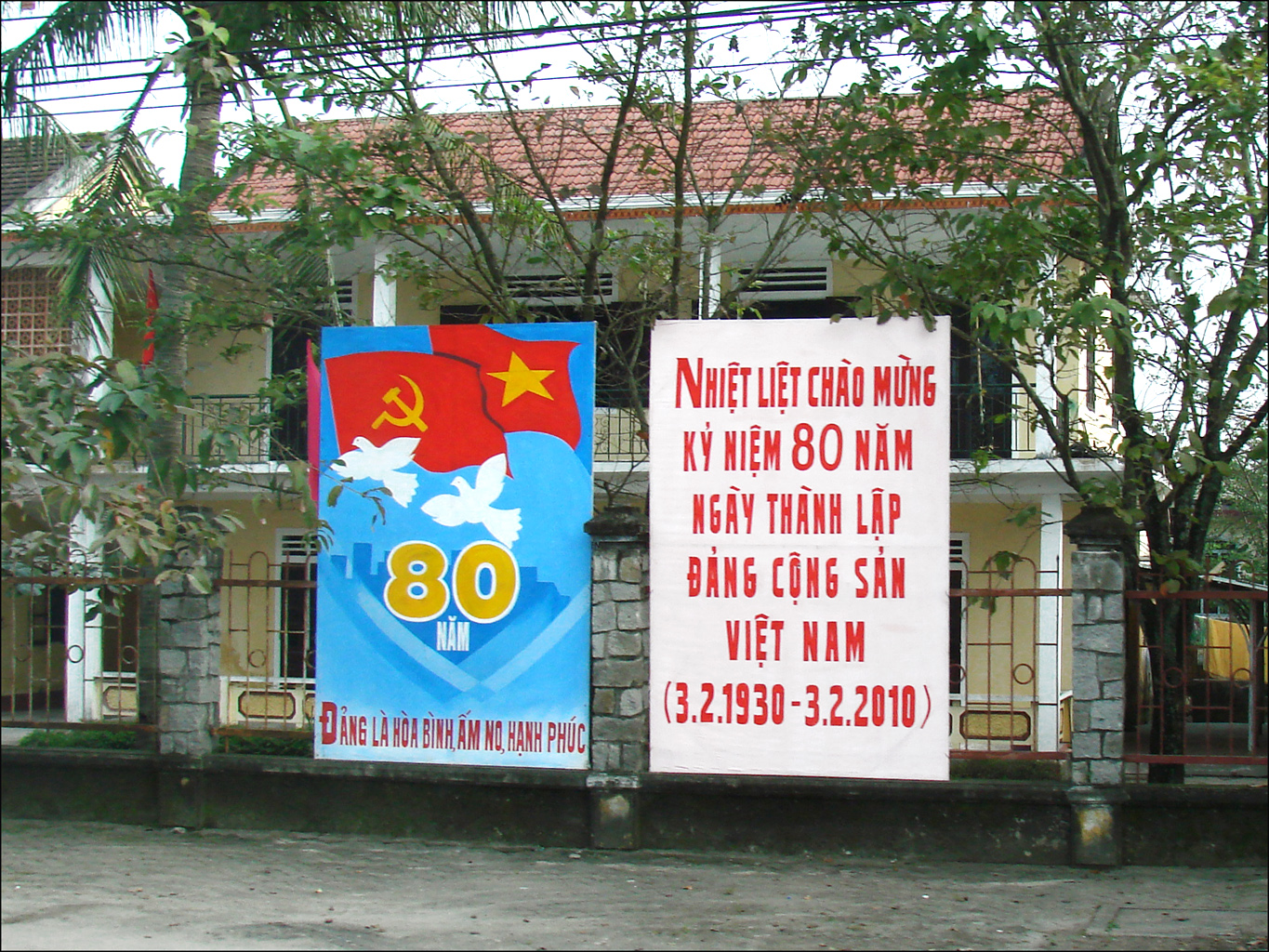
CPV propaganda poster commemorating its 80th anniversary and equating the party with "peace, prosperity and happiness"

The Communist Party believes that socialism is superior to other ideologies and state systems. According to Marxism–Leninism, socialism is the second-to-last stage of socio-economic development before the classless, stateless and moneyless society that is communism.

To build a socialist society, communists revolutionaries have to imagine, outline and study society. The party believes that socialism leads to human liberation from every oppressive relations, exploitation and injustice. While the founders of Marxism–Leninism forecasted the main characteristics of a socialist society, the founders are not considered by the party to hold the whole truth. The main outline of this ideology is upheld by the party, that is, a social mode superior and more advanced:

1. The highest goal of socialism is to liberate the people from every yoke of exploitation and economic slavery of the spirit, enabling holistic human development.
2. The material base of socialism are the forces generated by modern advanced production.
3. Socialism is the gradual abolition of private property and capitalism and the transformation of the means of production to the working class.
4. Socialism creates labor organizations and a new form laborer with high discipline and productivity.
5. Socialism means the implementation of the principle of each according to his contribution.
6. State socialism is a new kind of democracy, reflecting the nature of the working class and representing the interests, power and will of the working people.
7. In a socialist society, the relationship between class and ethnicity will be resolved through a combination of international and class solidarity—nationalism will be replaced by internationalism.

=== Socialist-oriented market economy ===
Proponents of the socialist-oriented market economy claim that the system is neither socialist nor capitalist, but that it is "socialist-oriented". The Communist Party rejects the view that a market economy has to be a capitalist invention. According to the party, "a socialist market-oriented economy is a multi-sectoral commodity economy, which operates in accordance with market mechanisms and a socialist orientation".

According to Nguyễn Phú Trọng, "it is a new type of market economy in the history of the market economy's development. It is a kind of economic organization which abides by market economy rules but is based on, led by, and governed by the principles and nature of socialism reflected in its three aspects – ownership, organization, and distribution – for the goal of a prosperous people in a strong nation characterized by democracy, fairness, and civilization".

There are multiple forms of ownership in a socialist-oriented market economy. Economic sectors operate in accordance with the law and are equal under the law in the interest of co-existence, cooperation and healthy competition. Nguyễn Phú Trọng said:

The state economy plays a key role; the collective economy is constantly consolidated and developed; the private economy is one of the driving forces of the collective economy; multiple ownership, especially joint-stock enterprises, is encouraged; the state and collective economies provide a firm foundation for the national economy. The relations of distribution ensure fairness, create momentum for growth, and operate a distribution mechanism based on work results, economic efficiency, contributions by other resources, and distribution through the social security and welfare system. The State manages the economy through laws, strategies, plans, policies, and mechanisms to steer, regulate, and stimulate socio-economic development.

Unlike in capitalist countries, a socialist-oriented market economy does not "wait for the economy to reach a high level of development before implementing social progress and fairness, nor 'sacrifice' social progress and fairness to the pursuit of mere economic growth". Policies are enacted for the sole purpose of improving the people's standard of living.

=== Role of Marxism ===
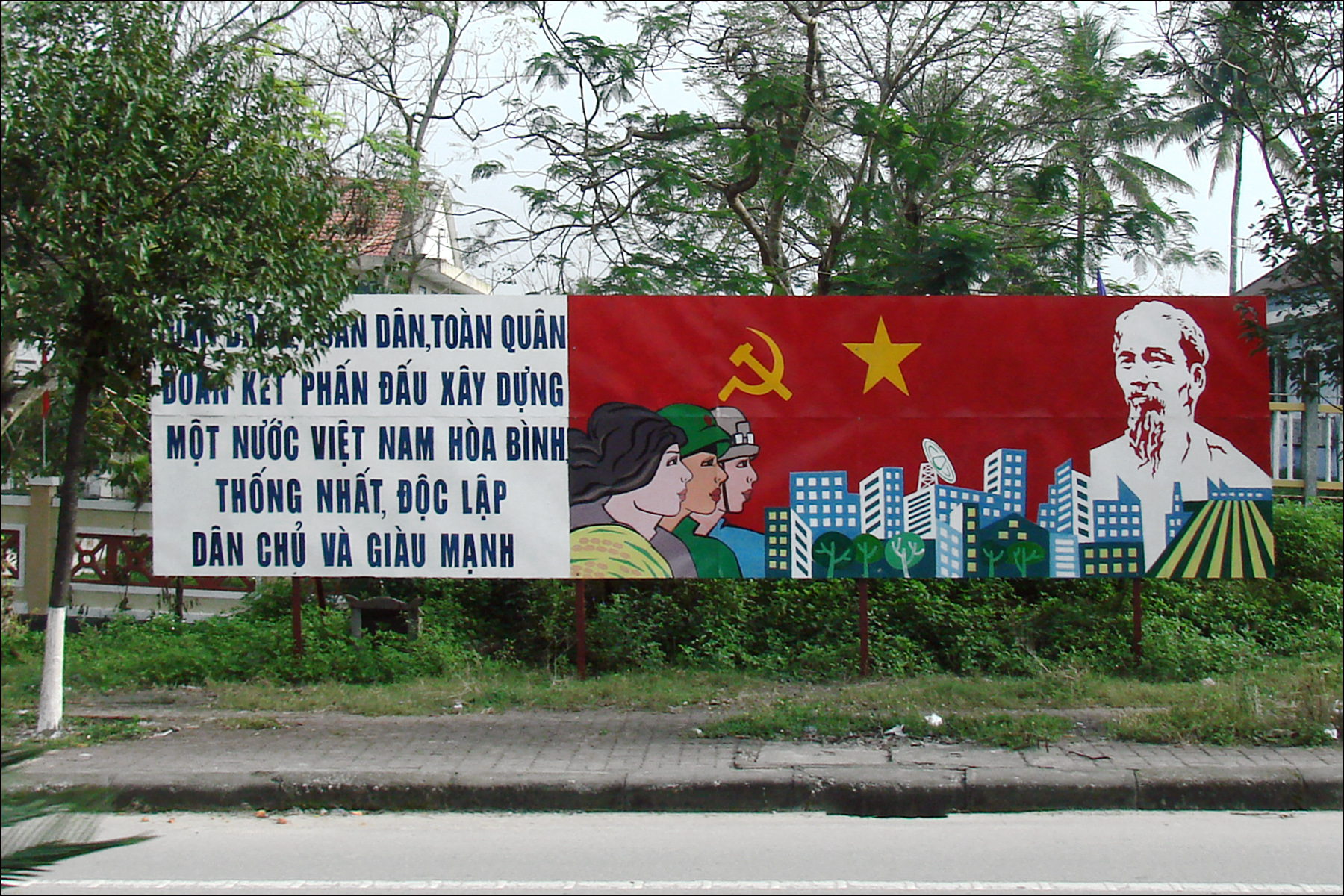
CPV propaganda poster in Huế

Classical Marxist texts still play a prominent role in the Communist Party's ideological development. The Communist Manifesto, written by Karl Marx and Friedrich Engels, is considered an "immortal work". According to the party, the real value of The Communist Manifesto is not that it can provide answers to present revolutionary problems, but the way it explains the gradual liberation of the working class and laborers. It functions as a basis for the most basic theoretical beliefs upheld by the party.

According to Tô Huy Rứa, currently a member of the 11th Politburo: "By participating in the process of globalization complete with its opportunities and challenges, as was predicted by Marx and Engels in the Manifesto, the Vietnamese Communist Party and people will further find guidelines for a precious world outlook and methodologies. Sustainable values of this immortal theoretical work and political platform will remain forever". Trần Bạch Đằng wrote:

The reality of Vietnam after the revolution is different from what I imagined when I joined the party ... Life has shown us that it is much more complicated. The thing is, we received Marxism in a theoretical sense, not in a full sense, and the information was not very precise. Marxism came to Vietnam through the interpretation of Stalin and Mao. It was simplified to a great extent. And now we read the classic works of Marx and other founders, and we find that things were not so simple. Though the social conditions under which Marx wrote his works are not the same as now, the principles are the same. Yet those principles were not interpreted precisely correctly.

=== Stance on nationalism ===
The Communist Party of Vietnam was founded in 1930, competing with nationalist parties. In 1941, it established the Viet Minh as a coalition front. Amid the Indochina wars and the broader Cold War, anti-communist nationalists claimed that the communists had betrayed genuine nationalists, insisting that Vietnamese communism and Vietnamese nationalism were mutually exclusive. The communists revolutionaries, however, have portrayed themselves as the sole legitimate leaders of Vietnamese nationalism to legitimize the authority of the Communist Party.

Ho Chi Minh rejected the "traditional conservative Vietnamese nationalist course". He also rejected selfish nationalism and rather advocated for patriotism, besides that he still saw nationalism as a driving force against colonized states. While seeing it as a driving force, Ho and the Viet Minh fought against "short-sighted nationalism and great-power chauvinism." According to Ho, however, "genuine patriotism" could "never be separated from proletarian internationalism". Ho's Vietnamese nationalism was for multiculturalism. The CPV and its government supports socialist patriotism.

=== Analysis ===
The CPV's ideology has been criticized from the left for its supposed departure from Marxist principles. Critics have argued that the socialist-oriented market economy is a re-capitalized system which allows massive capitalist markets, enriches the bourgeoisie, and increases foreign direct investment, at the cost of expanding economic inequality and social unrest. Leftist dissident Bui Tin opined that "the Communist Party [of Vietnam] is full of opportunists and privileged elites. The morality is lost. All is the search for dollars."

== Party-to-party relations ==
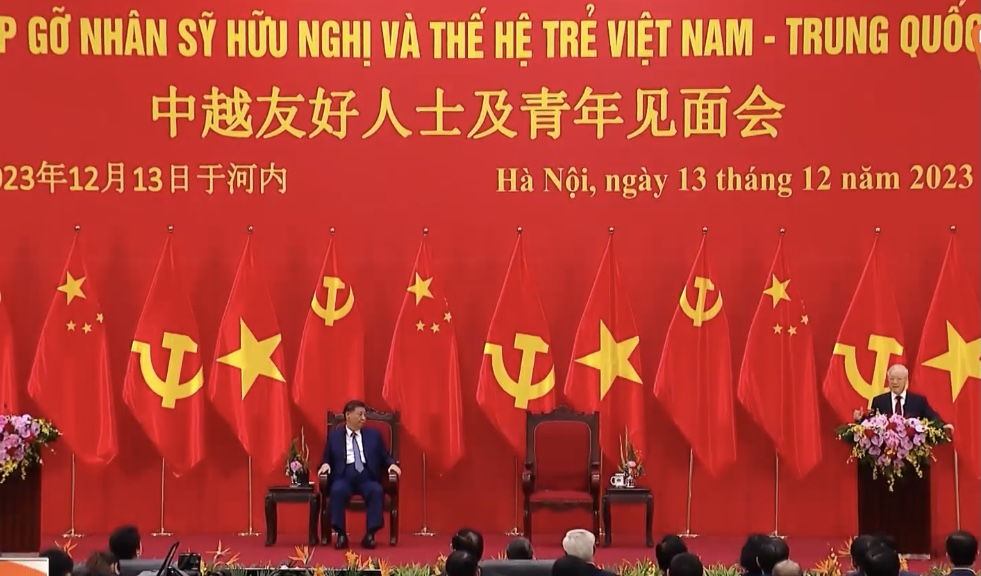
General Secretary Nguyễn Phú Trọng and Chinese Communist Party General Secretary Xi Jinping in December 2023

In a resolution of the 10th National Party Congress, it was decided to renovate and strengthen the party's foreign policy. As of 2010, the CC's Commission for External Relations has good relations with 222 political parties in 115 countries. According to the party, this is an "important contributions to accelerating the renovation process, industrialization and modernization of Vietnam".

The party does not only have foreign relations with communist parties; relations with non-communist parties have been established because their countries are economically important to Vietnam. Relations with other communist and workers' parties are very important and built on "solidarity, friendship, mutual support in the struggle for socialism in the spirit of Marxism-Leninism and pure internationalism of the working class".

It exchanges views with such parties on theoretical and practical issues regarding socialist construction, party building and current problems. The CPV is active in international communist and workers party gatherings, such as the International Meeting of Communist and Workers' Parties.

The CPV currently maintains relations with over 100 communist and workers' parties. The party has emphasized the importance of relations with the Lao People's Revolutionary Party and the Cambodian People's Party, as all three parties are the spiritual incarnations of the Indochinese Communist Party. It also maintains good relations with the Chinese Communist Party, the Communist Party of Cuba, and the Workers' Party of Korea. The CPV sent delegations to the 8th Congress of the Communist Party of the Russian Federation in 2008, the 5th Congress of the Party of Italian Communists in 2008, the 20th Congress of the Communist Party of India in 2008, the 9th Communist Party of India (Marxist) in 2008, the 18th Congress of Communist Party of Greece in 2009, the 9th Congress of the Communist Party of Denmark in 2009, the 18th Congress of the Communist Party of Spain in 2009, the 8th Congress of the Communist Party of Nepal (Marxist–Leninist) in 2009, the 12th Congress of the Communist Party of Brazil in 2009 and that of the Peruvian Communist Party in 2010.

The CPV maintains also friendly relations with Latin American left-wing political parties. A delegation from the CPV participated in the 22nd Meeting of Foro de São Paulo in El Salvador in June 2016.

== Electoral history ==
=== National Assembly elections ===
Election	Votes	%	Seats	+/–	Position	Outcome
1960	As part of the Vietnamese Fatherland Front		421 / 421	▲421	▲1st	Sole legal party
1964	As part of the Vietnamese Fatherland Front		366 / 366	▼55	1st	Sole legal party
1971	As part of the Vietnamese Fatherland Front		420 / 420	▲54	1st	Sole legal party
1975	As part of the Vietnamese Fatherland Front		424 / 424	▲4	1st	Sole legal party
1976	As part of the Vietnamese Fatherland Front		492 / 492	▲68	1st	Sole legal party
1981	As part of the Vietnamese Fatherland Front		496 / 496	▲4	1st	Sole legal party
1987	As part of the Vietnamese Fatherland Front		496 / 496	Steady	1st	Sole legal party
1992	As part of the Vietnamese Fatherland Front		362 / 395	▼134	1st	Sole legal party
1997	As part of the Vietnamese Fatherland Front		384 / 450	▼11	1st	Sole legal party
2002	As part of the Vietnamese Fatherland Front		447 / 498	▲63	1st	Sole legal party
2007	As part of the Vietnamese Fatherland Front		450 / 493	▲3	1st	Sole legal party
2011	As part of the Vietnamese Fatherland Front		454 / 500	▲4	1st	Sole legal party
2016	As part of the Vietnamese Fatherland Front		473 / 494	▲19	1st	Sole legal party
2021	As part of the Vietnamese Fatherland Front		485 / 499	▲12	1st	Sole legal party
2026	As part of the Vietnamese Fatherland Front		482 / 500	▼3	1st	Sole legal party

== See also ==
- Communism in Vietnam
- Human rights in Vietnam
- Politics of Vietnam
- National Assembly (Vietnam)
