= 1960 North Vietnamese legislative election =

Parliamentary elections were held in North Vietnam on 8 May 1960. Only candidates representing the Vietnamese Fatherland Front (an alliance of the Vietnamese Workers' Party together with various bloc parties and satellite organisations) contested the election, whilst an additional 59 seats were reserved for deputies elected in what became South Vietnam in 1946. Voter turnout was reported to be 99.9%.

== Results ==
Party	Votes	%	Seats
Vietnamese Fatherland Front			362
Reserved seats			59
Total			421
Registered voters/turnout		99.9	
Source: Nohlen et al.
