= 1971 North Vietnamese legislative election =

- 11 April 1971
- All 420 seats in the National Assembly
- Turnout: 98.9%
Party	Leader	Seats	+/–
Vietnamese Fatherland Front	Lê Duẩn	420	+54
This lists parties that won seats. See the complete results below.

Parliamentary elections were held in North Vietnam on 11 April 1971. Only candidates representing the Vietnamese Fatherland Front (an alliance of the Vietnamese Workers' Party together with various bloc parties and satellite organisations) contested the election. Voter turnout was reported to be 98.9%. Of the 529 candidates, 420 got elected.

== Results ==
Party	Votes	%	Seats	+/–
Vietnamese Fatherland Front			420	+54
Total			420	+54
Registered voters/turnout		98.9		
Source: Nohlen et al.
