= 2021 Vietnamese legislative election =

2021 Vietnamese parliamentary election
- 23 May 2021

All 500 seats in the National Assembly 251 seats needed for a majority
- Turnout: 99.60%
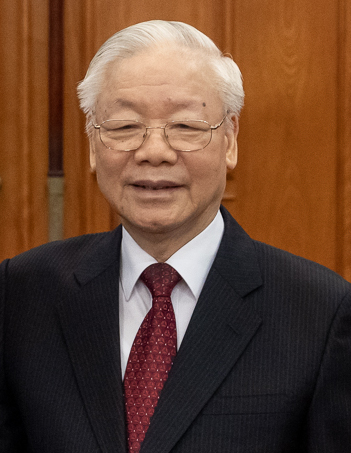

	First party	Second party
Leader	Nguyễn Phú Trọng
Party	Communist Party	Independents
Alliance	Fatherland Fr.	Fatherland Fr.
Leader since	19 January 2011
Last election	475	19
Seats won	485	14
Seat change	▲10	▼5
Prime Minister before election
Phạm Minh Chính
Elected Prime Minister
Phạm Minh Chính

Legislative elections were held in Vietnam on 23 May 2021 to elect members of the National Assembly, which would subsequently appoint the Prime Minister, and deputies of People's Councils. The election took place on a Sunday in line with local legislation. Results were announced on 10 June.

== Background ==
The Communist Party of Vietnam rules Vietnam as a one-party state and as such is the only party that can contest the elections. In the 2016 elections the party won 475 of the 496 seats, with the rest going to independent members of the government-aligned Vietnamese Fatherland Front.

== Electoral system ==
The members of the National Assembly were elected from 184 multi-member constituencies using the two-round system, with a maximum number of 500 candidates to be elected. Block voting was used, with each district having two or three seats. Candidates had to receive at least 50% of the vote in the first round to be elected, with a second round held on a plurality basis.

== Results ==
One seat in Bình Dương Province was left vacant after the National Election Council did not confirm the winning candidate was eligible to enter parliament.

Party	Votes	%	Seats	+/–
Communist Party of Vietnam			485	+10
Independents			14	–5
Vacant			1	–
Total			500	+4
Total votes	69,243,604	–		
Registered voters/turnout	69,523,133	99.60		
Source: National Election Council, Vietnamplus
