= 1976 Vietnamese legislative election =

Parliamentary elections were held in Vietnam on 25 April 1976, the first after the country was de facto reunited following the North's military victory over the South the previous year. The Vietnamese Fatherland Front was the only party to contest the election, and won all 492 seats. Voter turnout was reported to be 99%. The elections led to the official reunification of Vietnam on 2 July 1976.

== Candidates ==
In what had been North Vietnam, the Workers' Party of Vietnam and other groups nominated 308 candidates for the 249 seats, while in the south, the Alliance of National, Democratic and Peaceful Forces and National Liberation Front nominated 297 candidates for the 243 seats. All were under the umbrella of the Vietnamese Fatherland Front. Although there were no candidates allowed from opposition parties, candidates included former Third Force Movement activists (anti-war, non-communists), such as Mrs. Ngo Ba Thanh, who had led the Vietnamese Women's Movement for the Right to Live and Huỳnh Tấn Mẫm, who had been a leader of the Saigon Students' Association's resistance movement.

== Results ==
Party	Votes	%	Seats
Workers' Party of Vietnam and other groups	22,895,611	100.00	249
National Liberation Front–Vietnam Alliance of National, Democratic and Peaceful Forces	22,895,611	100.00	243
Total	22,895,611	100.00	492
Valid votes	22,895,611	99.12	
Invalid/blank votes	204,054	0.88	
Total votes	23,099,665	100.00	
Registered voters/turnout	23,387,940	98.77	
Source: IPU
