= 1964 North Vietnamese legislative election =

Parliamentary elections were held in North Vietnam on 26 April 1964. Only candidates representing the Vietnamese Fatherland Front (an alliance of the Vietnamese Workers' Party together with various bloc parties and satellite organisations) contested the election. Voter turnout was reported to be 98%.

== Results ==
Party	Votes	%	Seats	+/–
Vietnamese Fatherland Front			366	+4
Total			366	–55
Total votes	8,580,002	–		
Registered voters/turnout	8,755,002	98.00		
Source: Nohlen et al.
