= Vietnam Fatherland Front =

Vietnam's political coalition

Vietnam Fatherland Front Mặt trận Tổ quốc Việt Nam
- Abbreviation: VFF; MTTQVN
- Chairman: Bùi Thị Minh Hoài
- Secretary-General: Hà Thị Nga
- Governing body: Central Committee
- Founded: 18 November 1930 (first formation); February 1977
- Merger of: (North Vietnam) (North) Vietnam Fatherland Front; (Provisional Revolutionary Government of the Republic of South Vietnam) National Liberation Front of South Vietnam; Alliance of National, Democratic, and Peace Forces
- Preceded by: (North Vietnam) League for Independence of Vietnam
- Headquarters: Hanoi
- Ideology: Ho Chi Minh Thought; Laborism; Anti-corruption
- Colors: Red
- National Assembly: 500 / 500

Website
- mattran.org.vn

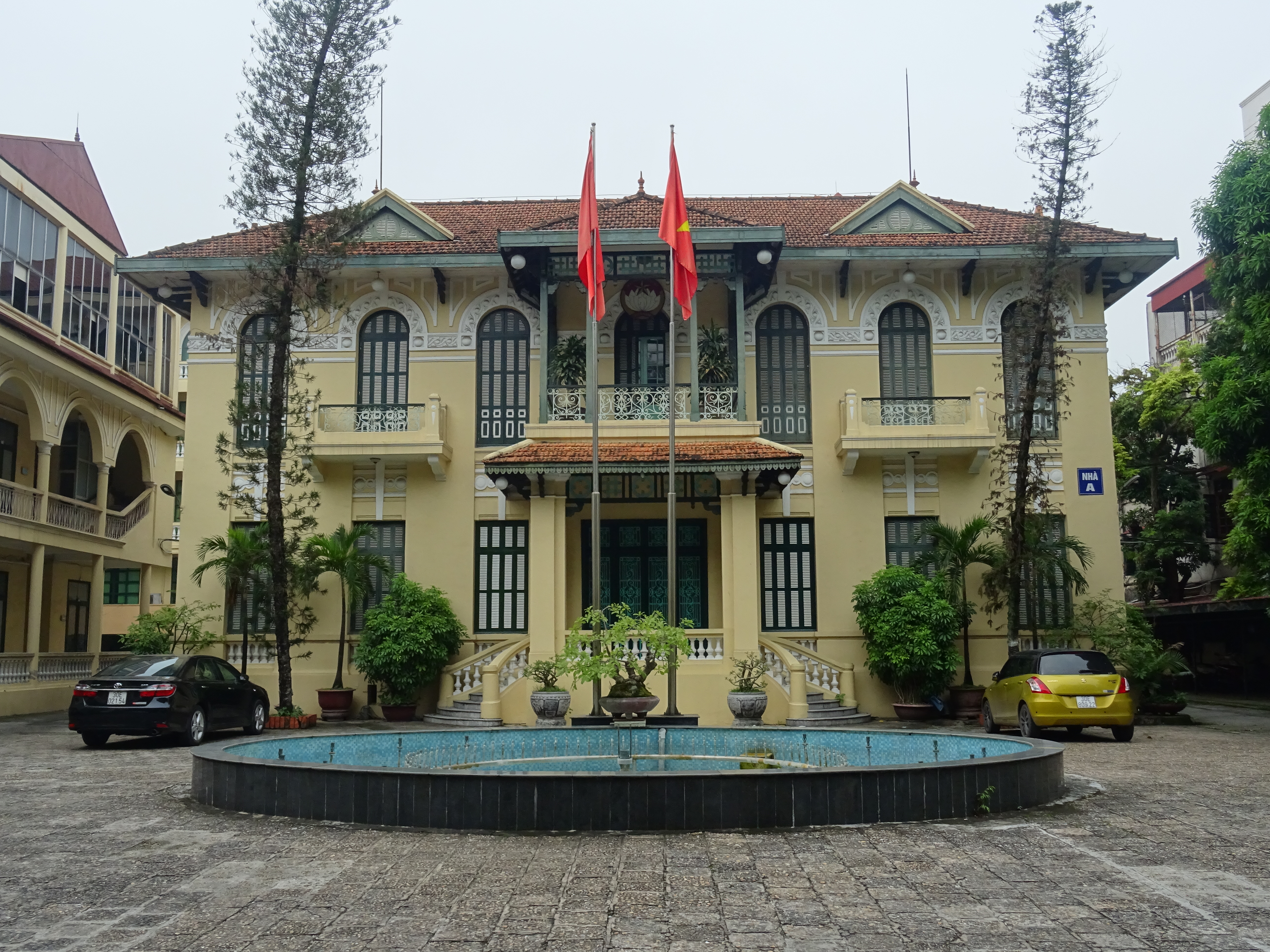
The building of the Central Committee of Vietnam Fatherland Front on Tràng Thi Street, Hanoi.

The Vietnam Fatherland Front (VFF, alternatively Vietnamese Fatherland Front; Vietnamese: Mặt trận Tổ quốc Việt Nam) is constitutionally an integral component in the political structure of the Socialist Republic of Vietnam and an umbrella group of mass movements and political coalition aligned with the Communist Party of Vietnam that dominates the National Assembly of Vietnam, forming the government of Vietnam and all recognised national socio-political organisations.

It was founded in February 1977 by the merger of the Vietnam Fatherland Front of North Vietnam and the two so-called "Viet Cong" popular fronts, the National Liberation Front of South Vietnam and the Alliance of National, Democratic and Peace Forces, in South Vietnam. The modern incarnation of the League for the Independence of Vietnam (Viet Minh), it is an amalgamation of many smaller groups, including the Communist Party itself. Other groups that participated in the establishment of the Front are the Vietnam General Confederation of Labour, the Ho Chi Minh Communist Youth Union (a.k.a. the Ho Chi Minh Youth) and the Ho Chi Minh Young Pioneer Organization. It also included the Democratic Party of Vietnam and Socialist Party of Vietnam, until they disbanded in 1988.

Some of the government's social programs are conducted through the Front. It has been given a role in programs of poverty reduction. The Front is also responsible for much of the government's policy on religion:

1. Everyone has freedom of beliefs and religions, he or she has the right to follow a religion or not to follow any religion. All religions are equal before the law.

2. The state respects and protects freedom of beliefs and religions.

3. No one should violate freedom of beliefs and religions or take advantage of beliefs and religions to infringe the law.

Virtually, the Front is intended to supervise the activity of the government and of government organisations. Because the Front's power base is mass participation and popular mobilisation, it is seen as representative of the people, and both the Constitution and laws give it a special role.

== Leadership ==
=== Secretaries General ===
- Nguyễn Văn Tiến (1977–1988)
- Phạm Văn Kiết (1988–1994)
- Trần Văn Đăng (1994–2004)
- Huỳnh Đảm (2004–2008)
- Vũ Trọng Kim (2008–2016)
- Trần Thanh Mẫn (2016–2018)
- Hầu A Lềnh (2018–2021)
- Lê Tiến Châu (2021–2023)
- Nguyễn Thị Thu Hà (from 2023)

=== Chair ===
- Hoàng Quốc Việt (1977–1983)
- Huỳnh Tấn Phát (1983–1988)
- Nguyễn Hữu Thọ (1988–1994)
- Lê Quang Đạo (1994–1999)
- Phạm Thế Duyệt (1999–2008)
- Huỳnh Đảm (2008–2013)
- Nguyễn Thiện Nhân (2013–2017)
- Trần Thanh Mẫn (2017–2021)
- Đỗ Văn Chiến (2021–2025)
- Bùi Thị Minh Hoài (from 2025)

== Former Front organisations ==
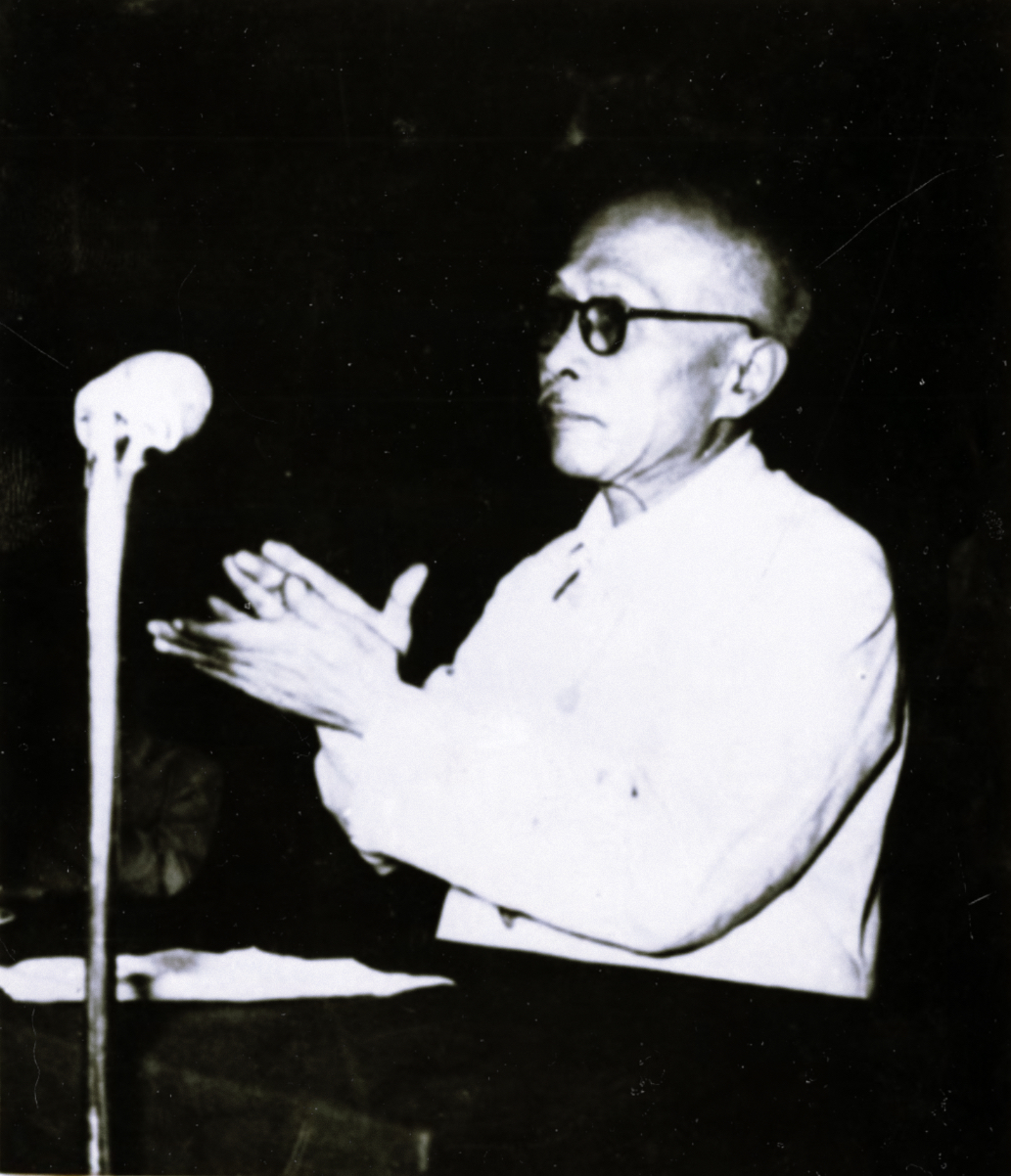
Tôn Đức Thắng giving the opening speech at the founding of the Vietnam Fatherland Front in 1955.

- Anti-Imperialist Alliance (Hội Phản đế Đồng minh) founded on 18 November 1930.
- League for the Independence of Vietnam (Việt Minh) founded by Hồ Chí Minh on 19 May 1941.
- Democratic Party of Vietnam. Founded 30 July 1944, dissolved 20 October 1988.
- Vietnamese National Popular League (Hội Liên hiệp Quốc dân Việt Nam or Liên Việt), founded on 29 May 1946. Head of the League: Huỳnh Thúc Kháng (1946–1947), Bùi Bằng Đoàn (1947–1951).
- Socialist Party of Vietnam. Founded 22 July 1946, dissolved 22 July 1988.
- Vietnamese National Popular Front (Mặt trận Liên Việt), founded in 1951, merger of Viet Minh and Lien Viet. Chairman: Tôn Đức Thắng.
- Vietnam Fatherland Front (Mặt trận Tổ quốc Việt Nam), founded in 1955 and replaced the Vietnamese National Popular Front. Chairman: Tôn Đức Thắng.
- National Liberation Front of South Vietnam, founded on 20 December 1960. Chairman: Nguyễn Hữu Thọ.
- Alliance of National, Democratic, and Peace Forces of Vietnam, founded on 20 April 1968. Chairman: Trịnh Đình Thảo.

== Electoral history ==
=== National Assembly elections ===
Election	Votes	%	Seats	+/–	Position	Role in government
1960			421 / 421	▲421	▲1st	Sole legal coalition under the control of CPV
1964	8,580,002	100%	366 / 366	▼55	1st	Sole legal coalition under the control of CPV
1971			420 / 420	▲54	1st	Sole legal coalition under the control of CPV
1975	10,561,314	100%	424 / 424	▲4	1st	Sole legal coalition under the control of CPV
1976	22,895,611	100%	492 / 492	▲68	1st	Sole legal coalition under the control of CPV
1981		100%	496 / 496	▲4	1st	Sole legal coalition under the control of CPV
1987		100%	496 / 496	Steady	1st	Sole legal coalition under the control of CPV
1992	37,195,592	100%	395 / 395	▼101	1st	Sole legal coalition under the control of CPV
1997	43,185,756	100%	450 / 450	▲55	1st	Sole legal coalition under the control of CPV
2002	49,211,275	100%	498 / 498	▲48	1st	Sole legal coalition under the control of CPV
2007		100%	493 / 493	▼5	1st	Sole legal coalition under the control of CPV
2011	61,965,651	100%	500 / 500	▲7	1st	Sole legal coalition under the control of CPV
2016	67,049,091	100%	494 / 494	▼6	1st	Sole legal coalition under the control of CPV
2021	69,243,604	100%	499 / 499	▲5	1st	Sole legal coalition under the control of CPV
2026	76,198,214	100%	500 / 500	▲1	1st	Sole legal coalition under the control of CPV
