= 2002 Vietnamese legislative election =

- 19 May 2002

All 498 seats in the National Assembly 250 seats needed for a majority
- Turnout: 98.85%
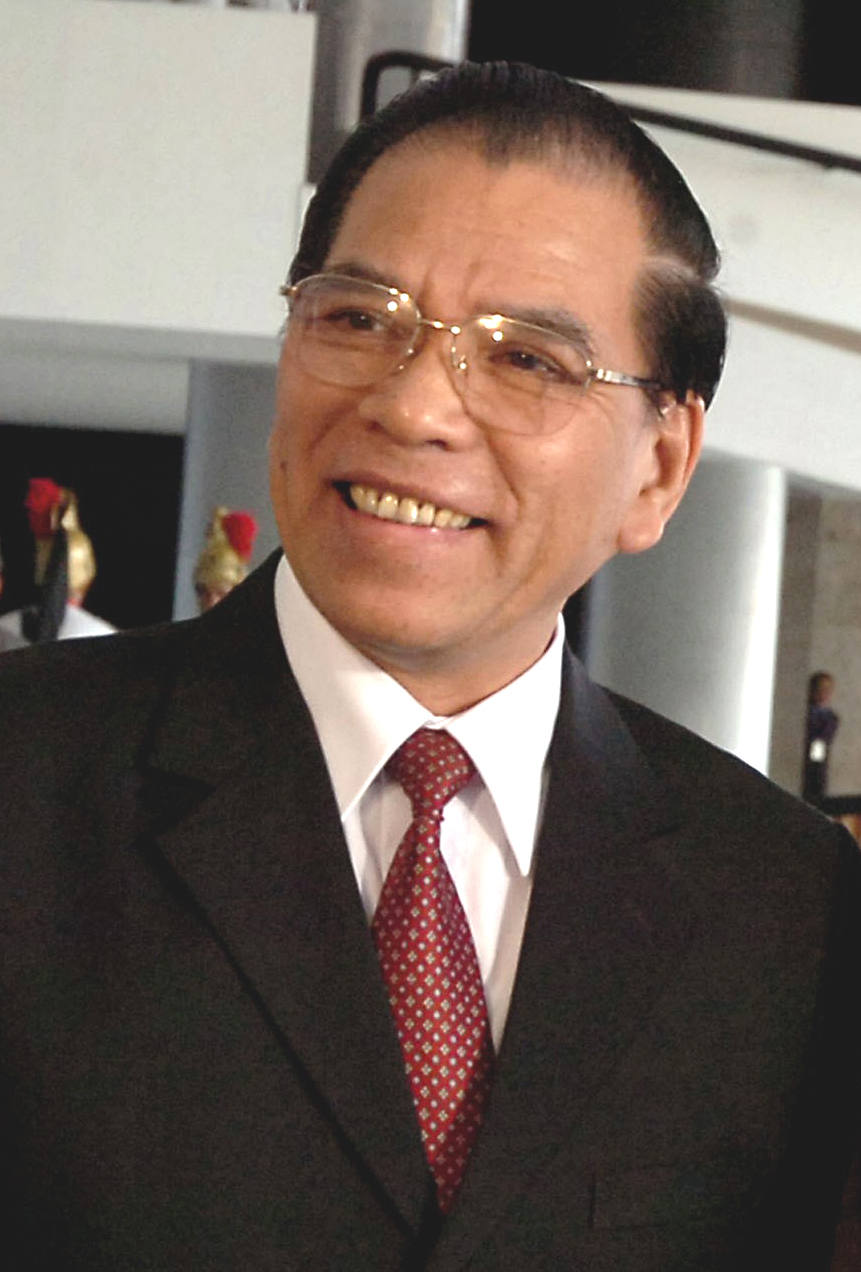

	First party	Second party
Leader	Nông Đức Mạnh	–
Party	Communist Party	Non-party members
Alliance	Fatherland Fr.	Fatherland Fr.
Last election	384	63
Seats after	447	51
Seat change	▲63	▼12
Prime Minister before election
Phan Văn Khải
Communist Party
Elected Prime Minister
Phan Văn Khải
Communist Party

Parliamentary elections were held in Vietnam on 19 May 2002. A total of 759 candidates, including 125 independents, contested the election. The Vietnamese Fatherland Front was the only organisation to nominate candidates, with 634 coming from the Communist Party of Vietnam and 125 being non-party members. The Communist Party won 447 of the 498 seats. Voter turnout was reported to be over 99%.

== Results ==
Party	Votes	%	Seats	+/–
Communist Party of Vietnam			447	+63
Non-party members			51	–12
Total			498	+48
Total votes	49,211,275	–		
Registered voters/turnout	49,783,769	98.85		
Source: IPU

== Aftermath ==
The first session of the new National Assembly met from July 19 to August 12, 2002. Nguyễn Văn An, who had held the position of Chairman of the National Assembly of Vietnam since 2001, after Nông Đức Mạnh was dismissed from the same role after being elected to the higher post of General Secretary of the Communist Party of Vietnam, was re-elected. Trần Đức Lương was re-elected as President, and Phan Văn Khải was re-elected as Prime Minister.
