= Banking in Vietnam =

Banking in Vietnam started in 1976 with the State Bank Vietnam, which became the central bank of the country. Vietnam's banks suffer from low public confidence, regulatory and managerial weakness, high levels of non-performing loans (NPL), non-compliance with the Basel capital standards, and the absence of international auditing. Foreign investment limit into national banks of Vietnam is currently set to 30 percent.

== History ==
Following its reorganization in 1976, the State Bank of Vietnam (formerly the National Bank of Vietnam) became the central bank of the country. In addition to its national financial responsibilities, the State Bank also assumed some of the duties of a commercial bank. It maintained a head office in Hanoi, a division in Ho Chi Minh City, and numerous provincial branches. Other important banks operating in Vietnam in 1988 included the Bank for Industry and Trade (VietinBank - now the largest listed bank) which provides credit to the industry and trade sectors, the Foreign Trade Bank, which was charged with overseeing all aspects of foreign payments, and the Bank for Agricultural Development, which provided loans to agriculture and fishing.

The first solely commercial bank opened in Ho Chi Minh City in July 1987 to handle personal savings and to extend loans to enterprises and individuals. The bank was capitalized with D500 million (US$1.4 million) provided by the government and through stock issues. One objective in establishing Vietnam's first commercial bank was to limit inflation through the bank's ability to coordinate the extension of credit.

To attract more foreign exchange, the Foreign Trade Bank opened an account in 1987 for overseas Vietnamese remittances of foreign currencies to their relatives at home. The currencies dealt with were United States dollars, French francs, Swiss francs, Hong Kong dollars, Canadian dollars, British pounds, Japanese yen, Australian dollars, and Deutsche Mark. In 1987 the bank also agreed to establish a finance company in Tokyo in partnership with a Japanese bank. As the first joint venture between the two countries, the proposed company was intended to help settle bilateral trade accounts, but it was also expected to assist in technology transfers.

== Current status ==
Vietnam's banks suffer from low public confidence, regulatory and managerial weakness, high levels of non-performing loans (NPL), non-compliance with the Basel capital standards, and the absence of international auditing. Since 1992 Vietnam's banking system has consisted of a combination of state-owned, joint-stock, joint-venture, and foreign banks, but the state-owned commercial banks predominate, and they suffer from high levels of NPL, most of them to state-owned enterprises. Consequently, in September 2005 Vietnam decided to equitize all five state-owned banks—a change from previous plans to equitize only two of them. In addition, Vietnam plans to boost the transparency of its financial system by establishing a credit-rating agency and performance standards for joint-stock banks. Large foreign banks are balancing their strong interest in serving multinationals in Vietnam and frustration with continuing restrictions on their activities. Although Vietnam is a cash-based society, there were 12,811 automated teller machines (ATMs) as of January 2012, and 40 million ATM Cards in circulation.

Foreign investment limit into national banks of Vietnam is currently set to 30 percent. The government is working on a law that would include this FDI cap.

== Joint stock commercial bank ==
Joint stock commercial bank is the Vietnamese term for banks that operate under a joint-stock model and are subject to specific government regulations and the regulations of the State Bank of Vietnam. The term is used to distinguish these banks from state-owned commercial banks and foreign joint-venture commercial banks and branches of foreign commercial banks in Vietnam. As of January 28, 2024, there are 49 banks operating in Vietnam, of which 31 are joint-stock commercial banks. These banks can be divided into two categories: urban joint-stock commercial banks and rural joint-stock commercial banks.

On July 29, 2008, the Vietnamese Government issued Official Letter No. 4944/VPCP-KTTH, announcing the Prime Minister's decision to temporarily suspend the granting of licenses for the establishment of new joint-stock commercial banks During the period waiting for the issuance of new regulations, the State Bank of Vietnam also suspended the acceptance of applications for licenses to establish and operate joint-stock commercial banks.

== Largest banks ==
Vietnam's top 5 banks by registered capital (as of March 2023, USD/VND exchange rate = 23,590 VND)

1. VietinBank $1.56 billion (32,661 billion VND)
2. Agribank $1.39 billion (29,154 billion VND)
3. Vietcombank $1.10 billion (23,174 billion VND)
4. BIDV $1.10 billion (23,011 billion VND)
5. Eximbank $0.59 billion (12,355 billion VND)
