= 2007 Vietnamese legislative election =

- 20 May 2007

All 493 seats in the National Assembly 247 seats needed for a majority
- Turnout: 99.64%
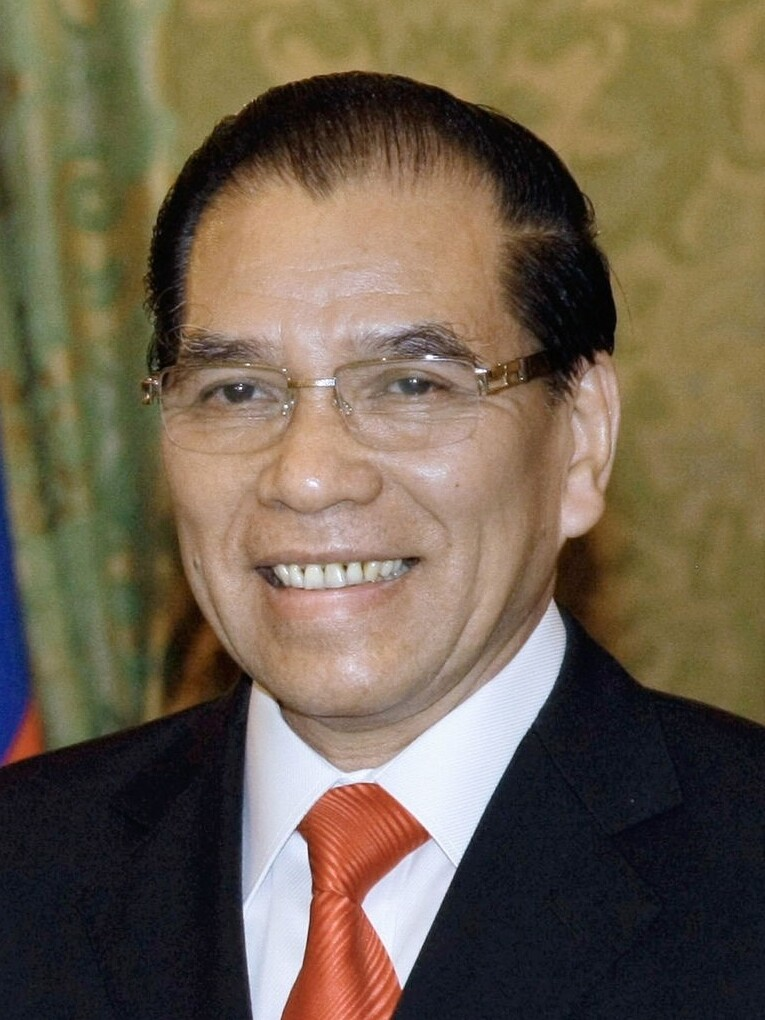

	First party	Second party
Leader	Nông Đức Mạnh	–
Party	Communist Party	Non-party and independents
Alliance	Fatherland Fr.	Fatherland Fr.
Last election	447	51
Seats won	450	43
Seat change	▲3	▼8
Prime Minister before election
Nguyễn Tấn Dũng
Communist Party
Elected Prime Minister
Nguyễn Tấn Dũng
Communist Party

Parliamentary elections were held in Vietnam on 20 May 2007.

== Results ==
Party	Votes	%	Seats	+/–
Communist Party of Vietnam			450	+3
Non-party members			42	–9
Independents			1	New
Total			493	–5
Registered voters/turnout		99.64		
Source: IPU

== Aftermath ==
Following the elections, in the first session of the new National Assembly, Nguyễn Phú Trọng was elected as Chairman on 23 July 2007. Incumbent president Nguyễn Minh Triết was re-elected by the new National Assembly on 24 July 2007 with 98.78% of the vote. Prime Minister Nguyễn Tấn Dũng, who had held the position since the resignation of Phan Văn Khải in 2006, was re-elected to the position on 25 July 2007. Other positions were also filled during this first session.
