= 1975 North Vietnamese legislative election =

Parliamentary elections were held in North Vietnam on 6 April 1975. The Vietnamese Fatherland Front won all 424 seats, with voter turnout reported to be 98%. They were the final elections held in North Vietnam, as Vietnamese reunification occurred the following year. There were 527 candidates.

== Results ==
Party	Votes	%	Seats	+/–
Vietnamese Fatherland Front	10,561,364	100.00	424	+4
Total	10,561,364	100.00	424	+4
Valid votes	10,561,364	99.01		
Invalid/blank votes	105,807	0.99		
Total votes	10,667,171	100.00		
Registered voters/turnout	10,855,644	98.26		
Source: IPU
