= Trần Đức Lương =

Vietnamese politician (1937–2025)

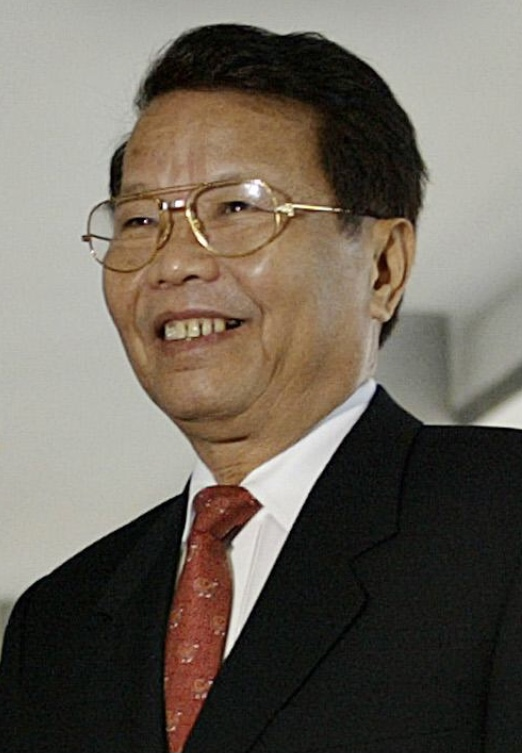
- Lương in 2004

6th President of Vietnam
- In office 24 September 1997 – 27 June 2006
- Prime Minister: Phan Văn Khải
- Vice President: Nguyễn Thị Bình; Trương Mỹ Hoa
- Preceded by: Lê Đức Anh
- Succeeded by: Nguyễn Minh Triết

Chairman of the Council for National Defense and Security
- In office 24 September 1997 – 27 June 2006
- Deputy: Phan Văn Khải
- Preceded by: Lê Đức Anh
- Succeeded by: Nguyễn Minh Triết

Deputy Prime Minister of Vietnam
- In office February 1987 – 29 September 1997
- Prime Minister: Phạm Văn Đồng; Phạm Hùng; Đỗ Mười; Võ Văn Kiệt; Phan Văn Khải

Personal details
- Born: 5 May 1937 Quảng Ngãi Province, Annam, French Indochina (now Vietnam)
- Died: 20 May 2025 (aged 88) Hanoi, Vietnam
- Resting place: Đức Phổ District, Quảng Ngãi Province
- Party: Communist Party of Vietnam (1959–2006)
- Spouse: Nguyễn Thị Vinh
- Children: Two, including Trần Tuấn Anh
- Education: Ho Chi Minh National Academy of Politics
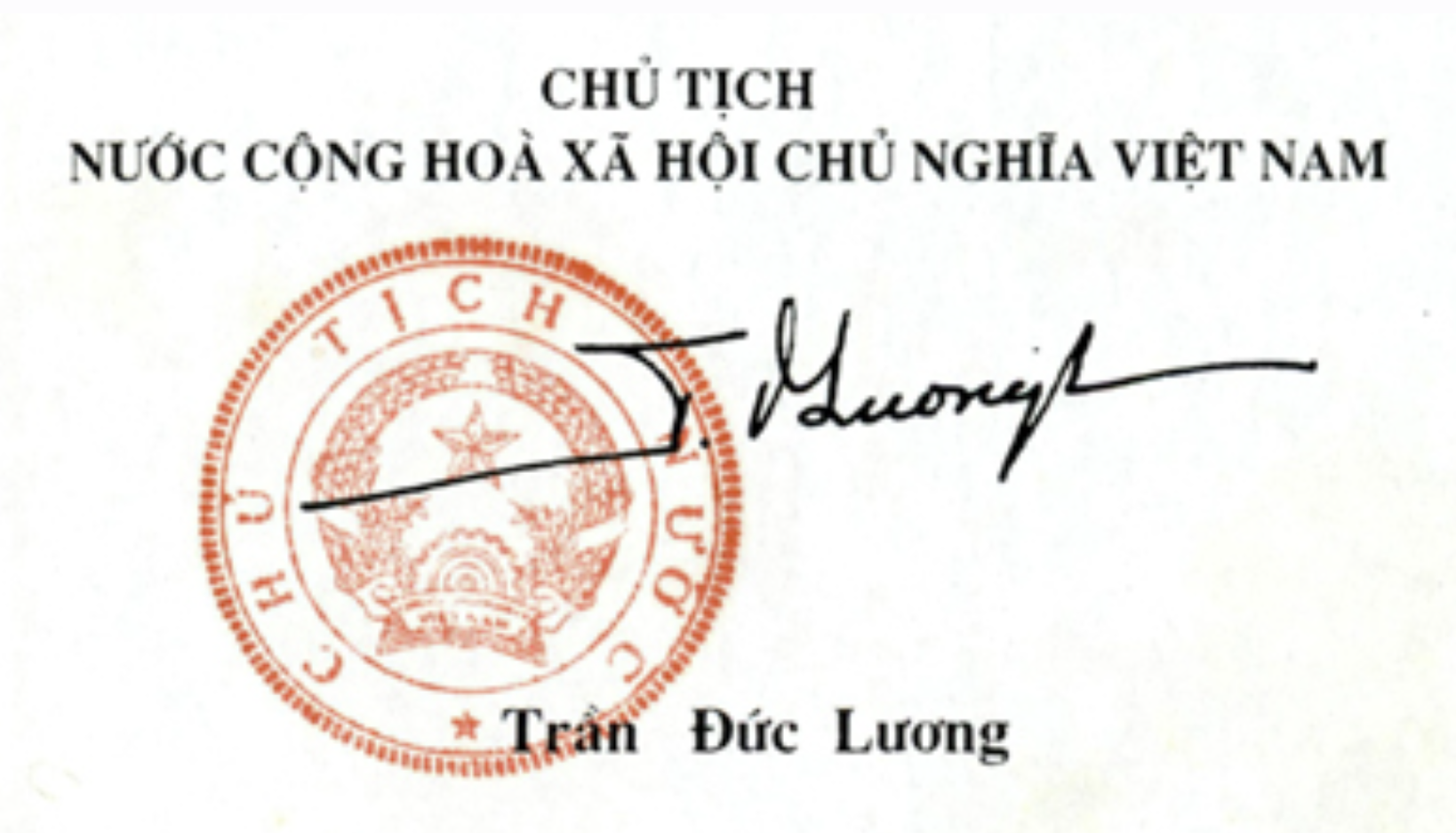
- Signature

Trần Đức Lương (Vietnamese: [t͡ɕən˨˩ ʔɗɨk̚˧˦ lɨəŋ˧˧]; 5 May 1937 – 20 May 2025) was a Vietnamese politician who served as the sixth President of Vietnam from 1997 to 2006.

== Early life ==
Trần Đức Lương was born in Đức Phổ District, Quảng Ngãi Province and relocated to Hanoi after graduating from high school in 1954. He studied geology at Hanoi University of Mining and Geology.

== Career ==
Lương joined the Communist Party of Vietnam in 1959, and became a functionary of the party in the 1970s. In 1987, he became Deputy Prime Minister of Vietnam. Member of the Politburo since June 1996, Trần Đức Lương was elected state president of the Socialist Republic of Vietnam on September 24, 1997, and re-elected in 2002. On June 24, 2006, Lương announced his resignation (along with Prime Minister Phan Văn Khải). Nguyễn Minh Triết was named to succeed Lương as president.

== Family ==
His son Trần Tuấn Anh was the head of the CPV's Central Economic Committee before resigning in 2024.

== Death ==
Lương died at his home on 20 May 2025, at the age of 88. State media, citing information from the CPV's Board of Health Protection and Care for Central Officials (Ban Bảo vệ, chăm sóc sức khỏe cán bộ Trung ương), stated that he died "due to old age and severe illness". A state funeral was carried out on 24 and 25 May, at the National Funeral House. Lương was buried in his hometown in Đức Phổ District, Quảng Ngãi Province on 25 May.

== Awards and honors ==
- Vietnam:
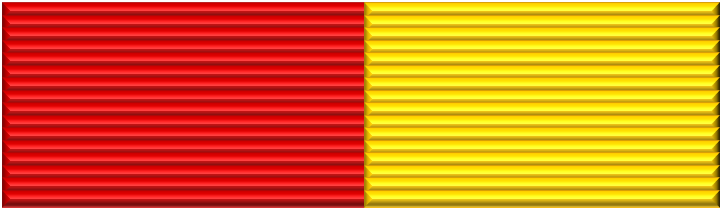
  - Gold Star Order (2007)
- France:
  - Grand Cross of the Legion of Honour (2002)
- Russia:
  - Order of Friendship (1997)
  - Honorary Professor of the Russian Academy of Sciences

Political offices
Preceded by Lê Đức Anh	President of Vietnam; 1997–2006	Succeeded by Nguyễn Minh Triết
Diplomatic posts
Preceded by Banharn Silpa-archa	Chairperson of ASEAN; 1998	Succeeded by Hassanal Bolkiah
