= 1992 Vietnamese legislative election =

- 19 July 1992

All 395 seats in the National Assembly 198 seats needed for a majority
- Turnout: 99.12%
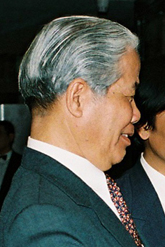

	First party	Second party
Leader	Đỗ Mười	–
Party	Communist Party	Independents
Alliance	Fatherland Fr.	Fatherland Fr.
Seats won	362	33
Prime Minister before election
Võ Văn Kiệt
Communist Party
Elected Prime Minister
Võ Văn Kiệt
Communist Party

Parliamentary elections were held in Vietnam on 19 July 1992. The Communist Party of Vietnam was the only party to contest the election, although independent candidates were also allowed, but must be affiliated with the Vietnamese Fatherland Front. Non-affiliated candidates were allowed to run for the first time in this election. While the VFF nominated 599 candidates (almost 90% of which were members of the Communist Party), there were only two independents. The VFF won all 395 seats.

== Results ==
Party	Votes	%	Seats
Communist Party of Vietnam			362
Independents			33
Total			395
Valid votes	36,837,427	99.04	
Invalid/blank votes	358,165	0.96	
Total votes	37,195,592	100.00	
Registered voters/turnout	37,524,453	99.12	
Source: IPU
