= 1987 Vietnamese legislative election =

Parliamentary elections were held in Vietnam on 19 April 1987, with a second round in eleven constituencies on 3 May. The Vietnamese Fatherland Front was the only party to contest the election, and nominated 829 candidates for the 496 seats. Voter turnout was reported to be 98.8% in the first round.

== Results ==
Party	Seats	+/–
Vietnamese Fatherland Front	496	0
Total	496	0
Source: IPU
