= 2016 Vietnamese legislative election =

Parliamentary election

2016 Vietnamese parliamentary election
- 22 May 2016

496 seats to the National Assembly 249 seats needed for a majority
- Turnout: 99.35%
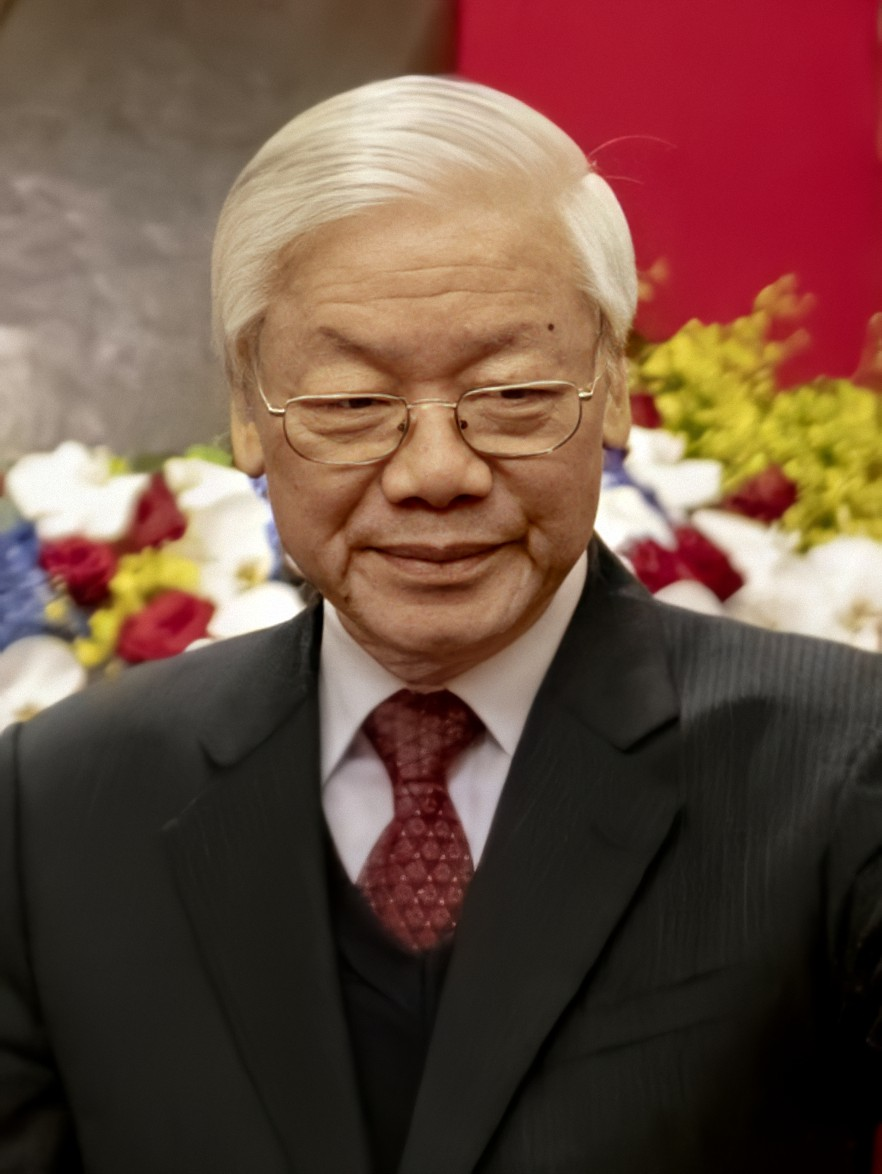

	First party	Second party
Leader	Nguyễn Phú Trọng	-
Party	Communist Party	Independent
Alliance	Fatherland Front	Fatherland Front
Leader since	January 19, 2011
Seats before	458	42
Seats won	475	21
Seat change	▲17	▼21
- Party structure of the 14th National Assembly of Vietnam at the 1st Session after the 2016 election
Prime Minister before election
Nguyễn Xuân Phúc
Elected Prime Minister
Nguyễn Xuân Phúc

Parliamentary elections were held in Vietnam on 22 May 2016 to elect members of the National Assembly, alongside local elections.

As Vietnam is a one-party state, the ruling Communist Party of Vietnam was the only party to contest the elections.

== Background ==
The election date, a Sunday, in line with the electoral law, was announced on 24 November 2015.

== Electoral system ==
The members of the National Assembly were elected from 184 multi-member constituencies using the two-round system, with a maximum number of 500 candidates to be elected; candidates had to receive at least 50% of the vote in the first round to be elected, with a second round held on a plurality basis.

== Campaign ==
A total of 870 candidates were approved to run for election, including 97 independents and 11 self-nominees.

== Results ==
Party	Votes	%	Seats	+/–
Communist Party of Vietnam			475	+21
Independents (organization-nominated)			19	–23
Independents (self-nominated)			2	–2
Total			496	–4
Total votes	67,049,091	–		
Registered voters/turnout	67,485,482	99.35		
Source: IPU

Initially the Communist Party had 475 elected delegates. However 2 delegates were disqualified from duty before the first meeting of the newly elected National Assembly. Therefore, the Communist Party had 473 elected delegates at the end.
