= 1981 Vietnamese legislative election =

Parliamentary elections were held in Vietnam on 26 April 1981. The Vietnamese Fatherland Front was the only party to contest the election and nominated forward 614 candidates for the 496 seats. Voter turnout was reported to be 98%.

== Results ==
Party	Votes	%	Seats	+/–
Vietnamese Fatherland Front			496	+4
Total			496	+4
Registered voters/turnout		97.96		
Source: IPU
