= 1997 Vietnamese legislative election =

- 20 July 1997

All 450 seats in the National Assembly 226 seats needed for a majority
- Turnout: 99.59%
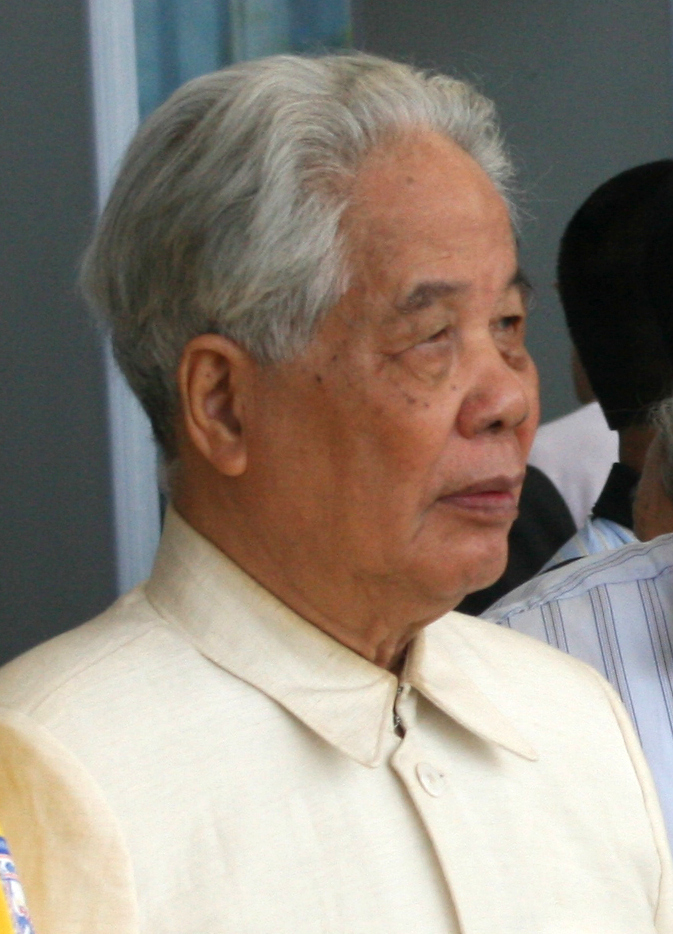

	First party	Second party
Leader	Đỗ Mười	–
Party	Communist Party	Non-party and independent
Alliance	Fatherland Fr.	Fatherland Fr.
Last election	364	33
Seats won	382	66
Seat change	▲18	▲33
Prime Minister before election
Võ Văn Kiệt
Communist Party
Elected Prime Minister
Phan Văn Khải
Communist Party

Parliamentary elections were held in Vietnam on 20 July 1997. The Communist Party of Vietnam (CPV) was the only party to contest the election, although independent candidates were also allowed to run, but must be affiliated with the Vietnamese Fatherland Front (VFF), an umbrella organization that is also under the control of the CPV. Non-affiliated candidates were also allowed to run. The VFF won 447 of the 450 seats, of which the CPV won 382. Voter turnout was reported to be 99.6%.

== Results ==
Party	Votes	%	Seats
Communist Party of Vietnam			384
Non-party members			63
Independents			3
Total			450
Valid votes	43,185,756	99.29	
Invalid/blank votes	307,868	0.71	
Total votes	43,493,624	100.00	
Registered voters/turnout	43,672,683	99.59	
Source: IPU

== Aftermath ==
The first session of the new National Assembly met from September 18 to September 29, 1997. In this first session, Nông Đức Mạnh was elected Chairman of the National Assembly of Vietnam, Trần Đức Lương was elected President of Vietnam, and Phan Văn Khải was elected Prime Minister of Vietnam. Other positions of power were also filled during this session.
