= 2005 in Vietnam =

- Decades: 1980s; 1990s; 2000s; 2010s; 2020s
- See also: Other events of 2005; History of Vietnam; Timeline of Vietnamese history; List of years in Vietnam

The following lists events that happened during 2005 in Vietnam.

== Incumbents ==
- Party General Secretary: Nông Đức Mạnh
- President: Trần Đức Lương
- Prime Minister: Phan Văn Khải
- Chairman of the National Assembly: Nguyễn Văn An

== Events ==
- January 20 – First Dedication Music Awards was held.
- March 12 – A train derailment in Hải Vân Pass.
- August 29 – September 4 – 2005 Asian Amateur Boxing Championships were held in Ho Chi Minh City.
- October 26 – Murderer Lê Thanh Vân was executed.
- November 21 – Ministry of Public Security abolished the regulation that each person could only register one motorbike.
- December 9 – 14 – 2005 World Wushu Championships was held in Hanoi.
- December 12 – A football match-fixing scandal occurred, as ten footballers were summoned by the police for match-fixing at the 2005 SEA Games.

== Births ==
- January – Nguyễn Tường San, transgender beauty pageant
- January 7 – Nguyễn Gia Bảo, footballer
- January 8 – Cao Văn Bình, footballer
- January 27 – Nguyễn Quang Vinh, footballer
- February 14 – Lê Nguyên Hoàng, footballer
- February 18 – Hoàng Quang Dũng, footballer
- March 12 – Nguyễn Hữu Tuấn, footballer
- March 23 – Thái Bá Đạt, footballer
- March 23 – Hoàng Minh Tiến, footballer
- July 10 – Mai Quốc Tú, footballer
- August 8 – Nguyễn Mạnh Hưng, footballer
- August 23 – Nguyễn Bảo Long, footballer
- September 7 – Nguyễn Đăng Dương, footballer

== Deaths ==
- February 19 – Huy Cận, poet (b. 1919)
- March 14 – Anh Thơ, poet (b. 1921)
- April 16 – Vũ Kỳ, personal secretary to Ho Chi Minh (b. 1921)
- April 29 – André Truong Trong Thi, engineer (b. 1936)
- August 8 – Trần Quốc Vượng, historian (b. 1934)
- October 6 – Nguyễn Văn Toàn, general (b. 1932)
- October 12 – Thái Hà, lacquer artist (b. 1922)
- December 25 – Ngô Xuân Quýnh, footballer (b. 1933)
