= 2003 in Vietnam =

- Decades: 1980s; 1990s; 2000s; 2010s; 2020s
- See also: Other events of 2003; History of Vietnam; Timeline of Vietnamese history; List of years in Vietnam

The following lists events that happened during 2003 in Vietnam.

== Incumbents ==
- Party General Secretary: Nông Đức Mạnh
- President: Trần Đức Lương
- Prime Minister: Phan Văn Khải
- Chairman of the National Assembly: Nguyễn Văn An

== Events ==
- February 26 – The first SARS patient in Vietnam hospitalized.
- March 11 – Hôpital français de Hanoï stops accepting new patients.
- April 28 – Vietnam became first country removed from the list of SARS-affected countries.
- May 2 – Bus explosion in Bắc Ninh province kills more than 40 people.
- July 1 – S-Fone was founded.
- September 2 – Mỹ Đình National Stadium was inaugurated.
- December 5–13 – 2003 SEA Games was held. This was the first time Vietnam staged the SEA Games.
- December 21–27 – 2003 ASEAN Para Games was held.

== Births ==
- January 2 – Nguyễn Văn Bách, footballer
- January 10 – Đinh Xuân Tiến, footballer
- January 13:
  - Nguyễn Đức Phú, footballer
  - Phương Mỹ Chi, singer
- January 15 – Hồ Văn Cường, footballer
- January 17 – Nguyễn Văn Triệu, footballer
- January 25 – Đào Thị Kiều Oanh, female footballer
- January 27:
  - Lê Trung Vinh, footballer
  - Trần Ngọc Sơn, footballer
  - Hà Châu Phi, footballer
- February 9 – Trần Trung Kiên, footballer
- February 24 – Bùi Vĩ Hào, footballer
- March 27 – Nguyễn Phi Hoàng, footballer
- March 28 – Pháo, rapper
- May 4 – Nguyễn Quốc Việt, footballer
- May 10 – Vũ Văn Sơn, footballer
- May 11 – Khuất Văn Khang, footballer
- May 16 – Nguyễn Đức Anh, footballer
- May 31 – Nguyễn Hồng Phúc, footballer
- June 18 – Đoàn Huy Hoàng, footballer
- July 13 – Nguyễn Thái Sơn, footballer
- July 27 – Nguyễn Nhật Minh, footballer
- July 28 – Nguyễn Thanh Nhàn, footballer
- September 10 – Nguyễn Văn Trường, footballer
- November 6 – Vũ Thị Hoa, female footballer
- November 10 – Viktor Le, footballer
- November 25 – Phạm Như Phương, artistic gymnast
- December 27 – Bùi Văn Bình, footballer

== Deaths ==
- February 12 – Duy Khánh, singer (b. 1936)
- March 26 – Platon Nguyễn Văn Thành, soldier (b. 1922)
- April 18 – Nguyễn Đình Thi, writer (b. 1924)
- August 28 – Hồ Thành Việt, computer programmer (b. 1955)
- August 29 – Nguyễn Xuân Oánh, economist and politician (b. 1921)
- October 20 – Hoàng Tích Chù, painter (b. 1912)
- November 23 – Trần Hoàn, songwriter (b. 1928)
- December 4 – Hoàng Đan, general (b. 1928)
