= 2004 in Vietnam =

- Decades: 1980s; 1990s; 2000s; 2010s; 2020s
- See also: Other events of 2004; History of Vietnam; Timeline of Vietnamese history; List of years in Vietnam

The following lists events that happened during 2004 in Vietnam.

== Incumbents ==
- Party General Secretary: Nông Đức Mạnh
- President: Trần Đức Lương
- Prime Minister: Phan Văn Khải
- Chairman of the National Assembly: Nguyễn Văn An

== Events ==
=== Ongoing ===
- H5N1 bird flu killed 20 people. 44 million birds were destroyed.

=== April ===
- April 10–11 – Mass protests in Đắk Lắk, Gia Lai and Đắk Nông provinces.

=== June ===
- June 1 – Nguyễn Quang Thường, Deputy General Director of PetroVietnam, was arrested.
- June 3 – Năm Cam was executed
- June 12 – Tropical Storm Chanthu made landfall in Central Vietnam.

=== August ===
- August 19 – VTC Digital Television was launched.

=== November ===
- November 28 – Cambodia–Laos–Vietnam Development Triangle Area was ratified.

== Births ==
- January 1 – Nguyễn Đức Việt, footballer
- February 5 – Trần Nam Hải, footballer
- February 20 – Nguyễn Ngọc Mỹ, footballer
- March 6 – Nguyễn Thái Quốc Cường, footballer
- June 23 – Ngọc Minh Chuyên, female footballer
- July 1 – Lê Văn Hà, footballer
- August 5 – Nguyễn Hiểu Minh, footballer
- August 19 – Nguyễn Đình Bắc, footballer

== Deaths ==
- February 3 – Mrs. Ngô Bá Thành, lawyer, politician and activist (b. 1931)
- March 26 – Phan Quang Đán, politician (b. 1918)
- April 1 – Trần Kim Phượng, diplomat (b. 1926)
- May 23 – Lê Minh Hương, Minister of Public Security of Vietnam (b. 1936)
- June 3 – Năm Cam, mobster (b. 1947)
- June 26 – Nguyễn Văn Hinh, general (b. 1915)
- August 24 – Tạ Tỵ, painter and poet (b. 1922)
- Unknown – Trần Văn Thọ, painter (b. 1917)
