= 2008 in Vietnam =

- Decades: 1980s; 1990s; 2000s; 2010s; 2020s
- See also: Other events of 2008; History of Vietnam; Timeline of Vietnamese history; List of years in Vietnam

The following are events that happened during 2008 in Vietnam.

== Incumbents ==
- Party General Secretary: Nông Đức Mạnh
- President: Nguyễn Minh Triết
- Prime Minister: Nguyễn Tấn Dũng
- Chairman of the National Assembly: Nguyễn Phú Trọng

== Events ==
- April 19 – Vinasat-1, the first Vietnamese satellite, was launched
- May 13 – Vietnam police arrested two journalists reporting on the PMU 18 scandal
- May 29 – The National Assembly passed a resolution to merge Hà Tây province, one district of Vĩnh Phúc province, and four communes of Hòa Bình province into Hanoi.
- July 14 – Miss Universe 2008 was held in Nha Trang
- August 10 – Hoàng Anh Tuấn won a silver medal at the 2008 Summer Olympics
- September 8 – Vedan was discovered discharging untreated waste into Thị Vải River.
- October 30–November 4 – Floods affected Northern and Central Vietnam.
- December 1 – Hồ Duy Hải was sentenced to death in a controversial case
- December 28 – Vietnam won the AFF Championship for the first time. At least four people dead in street storming.

== Deaths ==
- January 15 – Nguyễn Khải, writer (b. 1930)
- January 22 – Cao Văn Viên, general (b. 1921)
- January 31 – Hoàng Châu Ký, writer (b. 1921)
- February 7 – Hoàng Minh Chính, dissident (b. 1922)
- April 21 – Lê Đạt, poet (b. 1929)
- July 5 – Thích Huyền Quang, dissident (b. 1919)
- June 11 – Võ Văn Kiệt, Prime Minister of Vietnam (b. 1922)
- October 25 – Hoàng Minh Thảo, general (b. 1921)
