= 2007 in Vietnam =

- Decades: 1980s; 1990s; 2000s; 2010s; 2020s
- See also: Other events of 2007; History of Vietnam; Timeline of Vietnamese history; List of years in Vietnam

The following lists events that happened during 2007 in Vietnam.

== Incumbents ==
- Party General Secretary: Nông Đức Mạnh
- President: Nguyễn Minh Triết
- Prime Minister: Nguyễn Tấn Dũng
- Chairman of the National Assembly: Nguyễn Phú Trọng

== Events ==
=== January ===
- January 11 – Vietnam joined the World Trade Organization
- January 25 – Vietnam's prime minister Nguyễn Tấn Dũng becomes the first leader of the communist nation to meet and hold talks with the head of the Roman Catholic Church. Prime Minister Dũng met Pope Benedict XVI at the Vatican City in Rome.

=== May ===
- May 5 – 2006 Kite Awards was held in Hanoi

=== September ===
- September 26 – Collapse of Cần Thơ Bridge, which causes the death of at least 50 people.

=== October ===
- October 11 – A sex video clip of actress Hoàng Thùy Linh was posted online.
- October 16 – Vietnam was elected to United Nations Security Council
- October 25 – 4 people were arrested for posting Hoàng Thùy Linh's video.

=== November ===
- November 30 – Vietjet Air was granted approval, becoming the first private airline established in Vietnam.

=== December ===
- December 9 – Hundreds of people protested in Hanoi and Ho Chi Minh City against China's establishment of Sansha.
- December 18 – Work accident at Bản Vẽ hydropower plant killed 18 people

== Births ==
- April 27 – Nguyễn Lê Cẩm Hiền, chess player.
- November 28 – Trọng Nhân, champion of Vietnam's Got Talent season 4.

== Deaths ==
- January 22 – Ngô Quang Trưởng, general (b. 1922)
- February 8 – Nguyễn Hữu Đang, poet (b. 1913)
- February 25 – Viet Nguyen, conjoined twin (b. 1981)
- April 16 – Tran Bach Dang, politician (b. 1926)
- June 17 – Hữu Mai, writer (b. 1926)
- June 23 – Nguyễn Chánh Thi, general (b. 1923)
- July 1 – Mộng Tuyết, poet (b. 1914)
- July 28 – Bảo Long, crown prince (b. 1936)
- October 13 – Lâm Uyển Nhi, model (b. 1975)
- October 16 – Cao Xuân Hạo, linguist (b. 1930)
- November 27 – Chính Hữu, poet (b. 1926)
- December 4 – Phạm Tiến Duật, poet (b. 1941)
- December 10 – Cao Đăng Chiếm, senior security officer (b. 1921)
- December 17 – Huy Du, musician (b. 1926)
- December 20 – Raphaël Nguyễn Văn Diệp, bishop (b. 1926)
