= 2006 in Vietnam =

- Decades: 1980s; 1990s; 2000s; 2010s; 2020s
- See also: Other events of 2006; History of Vietnam; Timeline of Vietnamese history; List of years in Vietnam

The following lists events that happened during 2006 in Vietnam.

== Incumbents ==
- Party General Secretary: Nông Đức Mạnh
- President: Trần Đức Lương (until June 27); Nguyễn Minh Triết (starting June 27)
- Prime Minister: Phan Văn Khải (until June 27); Nguyễn Tấn Dũng (starting June 27)
- Chairman of the National Assembly: Nguyễn Văn An (until June 26); Nguyễn Phú Trọng (starting June 26)

== Events ==
- January 20 – Bùi Tiến Dũng, General Director of PMU18, was arrested in PMU 18 scandal.
- April 8 – Bloc 8406 was established.
- May 20 – 400 fishermen were missing due to Typhoon Chanchu.
- October 1 – Typhoon Xangsane made landfall in Da Nang.
- October 25 – Vietnam National Convention Center was inaugurated.
- November 12 – Prime Minister directed a temporary suspension of rice exports to stabilize market prices.
- November 18–19 – APEC Vietnam 2006 was held.
- December 5 – Typhoon Durian made landfall in Southern Vietnam.
- December 7 – Prime Minister allowed rice export again.
- December 23 – 23 students were required to retake exams after High School Graduation Examination scandal in Hà Tây province.
- December 29 – George W. Bush signed proclamation extending Permanent normal trade relations to Vietnam.

== Births ==
- February 2 – Vi Đình Thượng, footballer
- May 27 – Lê Đình Long Vũ, footballer
- June 3 – Nguyễn Công Phương, footballer

== Deaths ==
- January 1 – Nguyễn Văn Minh, general (b. 1929)
- February 25 – Dương Quỳnh Hoa, politician (b. 1930)
- March 16 – Hoàng Lập Ngôn, painter (b. 1910)
- April 26 – Bà Tùng Long, writer (b. 1915)
- May 2 – Nguyen Dinh Ngoc, intelligence officer (b. 1932)
- July 1 – Chu Huy Mân, general (b. 1913)
- August 17 – Yen Ngoc Do, newspaper publisher (b. 1941)
- September 20 – Phạm Xuân Ẩn, journalist (b. 1927)
- November 11 – Đặng Sỹ, military officer (b. 1929)
- Nguyễn Anh Huy, badminton player (b. 1943)
