= 2009 in Vietnam =

- Decades: 1980s; 1990s; 2000s; 2010s; 2020s
- See also: Other events of 2009; History of Vietnam; Timeline of Vietnamese history; List of years in Vietnam

The following are events that happened during 2009 in Vietnam.

== Incumbents ==
- Party General Secretary: Nông Đức Mạnh
- President: Nguyễn Minh Triết
- Prime Minister: Nguyễn Tấn Dũng
- Chairman of the National Assembly: Nguyễn Phú Trọng

== Events ==
- January 25 – Gianh River boat accident
- February 22 – Dung Quất Refinery were inaugurated
- February 23 – China and Vietnam marked the final demarcation of land border
- May 31 – First H1N1 case in Vietnam
- September 27 – 150 monks were forced to leave Bát Nhã Temple
- September 29 – Typhoon Ketsana made landfall in Quang Nam and Quang Ngai provinces
- October 30–November 8 – 2009 Asian Indoor Games

== Deaths ==
- February 22 – Paul Joseph Phạm Đình Tụng, cardinal (b. 1919)
- May 10 – Trần Nam Trung, Defence Minister of Republic of South Vietnam (b. 1912)
- May 20 – Nguyễn Bá Cẩn, Prime Minister of South Vietnam (b. 1930)
- June 10 – Nguyễn Khắc Ngư, prelate (b. 1909)
- September 7 – Paul Lê Đắc Trọng, bishop (b. 1918)
- October 14 – Vũ Dân Tân, painter (b. 1946)
