= Hằng Phương =

Vietnamese poet

- Born: Lê Hằng Phương; September 9, 1908 làng Nông Sơn, xã Điện Thọ, Điện Bàn, Quảng Nam Province,
- Died: February 2, 1983 (aged 74); Vietnam
- Occupation: Poet

Hằng Phương (Điện Bàn, 9 September 1908 – 2 February 1983) was a Vietnamese intimist poet.

She was born into an educated Confucian family and married writer Vũ Ngọc Phan. Her daughter is the painter Vũ Giáng Hương.

== Works ==
- Hương xuân (1943, in collaboration with Anh Thơ, Vân Đài, Mộng Tuyết)
- Một mùa hoa (1960)
- Chim én bay xa (1962)
- Mùa gặt "Harvest" (1961)
- Hương đất nước (1974)
