= Đông Hồ (poet) =

Vietnamese poet and journalist

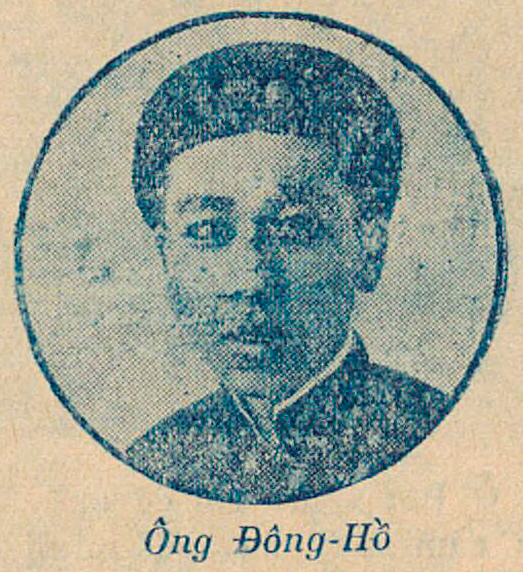
Portrait of poet Đông Hồ

Lâm Tấn Phác, pen name Đông Hồ (Đông Hồ, 10 March 1906 - 25 March 1969) was a Vietnamese poet and journalist. He was employed as a writer on the Saigon newspaper Đông Pháp Thời Báo during the 1920s. He was married to the poet Mộng Tuyết.
