= Võ Văn Kiệt =

Prime Minister of Vietnam

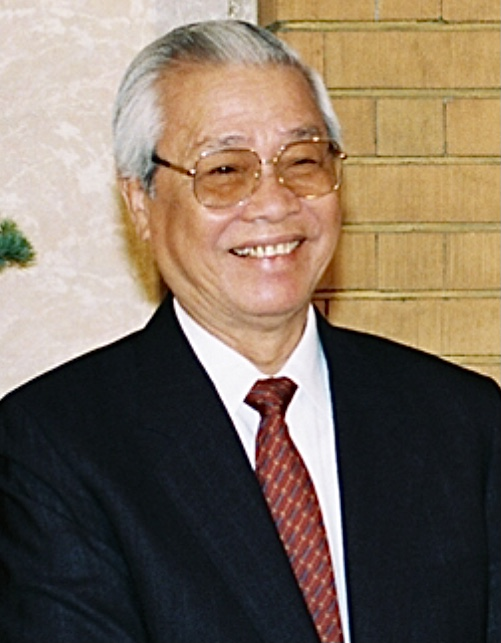
- Kiệt in 1993

4th Prime Minister of Vietnam
- In office 8 August 1991 – 24 September 1997 (Note: as Chairman of the Council of Ministers until 24 September 1992)
- President: Lê Đức Anh
- Deputy: Phan Văn Khải
- Preceded by: Đỗ Mười
- Succeeded by: Phan Văn Khải
- Acting; 10 March 1988 – 22 June 1988 (Note: as Acting Chairman of the Council of Ministers)
- President: Võ Chí Công
- Deputy: Himself
- Preceded by: Phạm Hùng
- Succeeded by: Đỗ Mười

First Deputy Prime Minister of Vietnam
- In office 23 April 1982 – 8 August 1991
- Prime Minister: Phạm Văn Đồng; Phạm Hùng; Đỗ Mười
- Preceded by: Tố Hữu
- Succeeded by: Phan Văn Khải

Chairman of the State Planning Commission
- In office April 1982 – March 1988
- Preceded by: Nguyễn Lam
- Succeeded by: Đậu Ngọc Xuân

Advisor to the Central Committee
- In office 29 December 1997 – 22 April 2001 Serving with Đỗ Mười and Lê Đức Anh
- Preceded by: Phạm Văn Đồng
- Succeeded by: Position abolished

Chairman of the People's Committee Ho Chi Minh City
- In office 20 January 1976 – January 1977
- Prime Minister: Huynh Tan Phat (President of the Government) Pham Van Dong
- Vice President: Mai Chí Thọ (Until July 1st); Lê Đình Nhơn (Chín Lê) (Until July 1st); Nguyễn Văn Hiếu (Until July 1st)
- Preceded by: Tran Van Tra (Military administration)
- Succeeded by: Vũ Đình Liệu

Vice chairman of the Military Governing Committee Saigon-Gia Dinh
- In office 3 May 1975 – 20 January 1976
- President: Trần Văn Trà

Personal details
- Born: Phan Văn Hòa; 23 November 1922 Vũng Liêm, Vĩnh Long
- Died: 11 June 2008 (aged 85) Mount Elizabeth Hospital, Singapore
- Party: Communist Party of Vietnam (1939–2001)
- Spouse: Phan Lương Cầm

Võ Văn Kiệt (Vietnamese: [vɔ̌ˀ vāŋ kîək]; 23 November 1922 – 11 June 2008) whose real name is Phan Văn Hòa, and includes aliases Sáu Dân, Chín Dũng, Chín Hòa, Tám Thuận. Was a Vietnamese politician and economic reformer who served as the Prime Minister of Vietnam from 1991 to 1997. A well regarded Vietnamese revolutionary and political leader, Kiệt was a veteran fighter in the long wars against the French colonialists and then the South Vietnamese and American forces during the Vietnam War.

He held key political positions in the South, and during the Second Indochina War, Võ Văn Kiệt was the senior political officer commanding the Saigon district and headquartered in the Củ Chi tunnels. His wife and children were killed when a US plane rocketed a passenger ferry carrying 200 passengers along the Saigon River.

In the difficult post-war years, he was one of the most prominent reformist leaders that led the Đổi mới (lit: Innovation) policy in Vietnam since 1986. His premiership (1991–1997) saw the country's return to the world arena after decades of war and isolation. He is considered as the "general engineer" of many bold projects of the Doi Moi period.

Kiệt, who played a driving role in the economic reform process in Vietnam that began in the mid-1980s, is exactly what United Nations Secretary General Ban Ki-moon once assessed, "Võ Văn Kiệt paved the way for the transformation of Vietnam from poverty to a decade of impressive economic growth." The five years of the 6th Party Congress (December 1986) to the 7th Congress (June 1991) were the time of the debate. Conflict and struggle at different levels, and areas between the two trends of returning to the old subsidized bureaucratic mechanism or decisively breaking up with it. Many officials either do it for personal gain or because they do not want it. Having enough determination and capacity, they did not dare and did not want to innovate. Faced with that situation, Võ Văn Kiệt and many senior leaders persevered, showing strong determination to innovate and clearly pointing out that innovation must follow closely, into practical conditions to meet the interests of the people and the country.

As Vice Chairman of the Council of Ministers (June 1988 - August 1991), Chairman of the Council of Ministers (August 1991 - October 1992), Prime Minister (October 1992 - December 1997), Kiệt proposed and directed the development and implementation of many groundbreaking policies such as: eliminating ordinance targets, granting business autonomy to state-owned enterprises; commercialize means of production, allowing large enterprises, both central and local, to directly import and export, ending the situation of two prices; abolish the mandatory purchasing regime imposed on farmers, abolish the river ban on markets, implement the free circulation of goods throughout the country, gradually transition the economy from a subsidized to a market economy.

== Background ==
Võ Văn Kiệt was born Phan Văn Hòa in 1922 into a peasant family in Trung Hiệp village, Vũng Liêm, Vĩnh Long province in the Mekong Delta in southern Vietnam, then a part of Cochinchina in what was called French Indochina. His birth name was Phan Văn Hòa and he changed it to Võ Văn Kiệt when he was admitted to the Indochinese Communist Party in 1939. He also had a pseudonym, Sáu Dân. He joined the Anti-imperialist Youth Movement and took part in the Nam Kỳ (Cochinchina) insurrection in Vũng Liêm district.

== Political career ==
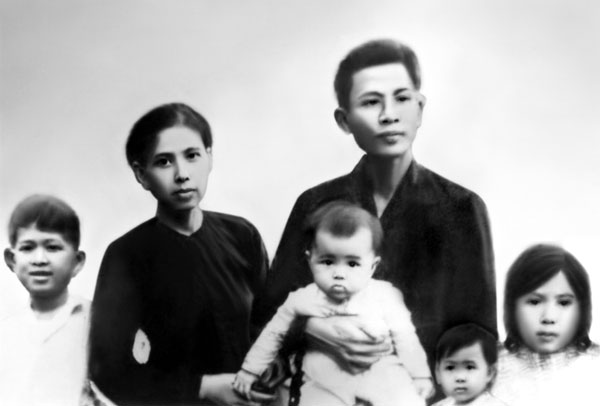
Family of Võ Văn Kiệt. His wife and two children were killed by a US rocket attack in 1966.

Võ Văn Kiệt was a member of the Viet Minh independence movement, he fought against the French colonial powers in the First Indochina War (1946–54) in Southern Vietnam. According to the Geneva Accords, communist cadres were forced to gather in North Vietnam, but he was among those who remained in the South, moving between secret bases in the southeastern region. His first wife, Trần Kim Anh, and his two children were killed in a rocket attack by US forces in 1966.

In 1960, he was elected alternate member of the Communist Party Central Committee and a member of COSVN in 1961, in command of communist forces in Saigon and surrounding areas.On May 3, 1975, he was appointed Vice Chairman of the Saigon-Gia Dinh Military Administration Committee, ending his term on January 20, 1976, after the handover ceremony with the Saigon-Gia Dinh Military Administration Committee previously held by Comrade Tran Van Tra. He then served as Chairman of the People's Committee Ho Chi Minh City under the pseudonym (Provincial Governor) and concurrently held the position of Deputy Secretary of the City Party Committee until the reunification of the Republic of South Vietnam with the Democratic Republic of Vietnam.After July 2, 1976, he served as Deputy Secretary of the City Party Committee and concurrently held the position of Chairman of the People's Committee of Ho Chi Minh City, following the first session of the 6th National Assembly of Vietnam, which passed a decision to rename the city from Saigon-Gia Dinh to Ho Chi Minh City in memory of the beloved leader who had passed away.

In the early postwar years, South Vietnam's economy deteriorated rapidly due to the withdrawal of US investment and the harsh Stalinist policies enforced by central government. Saigon, formerly a dynamic economic center, faced for the first time a widespread lack of food and other commodities. As the head of the city government, Võ Văn Kiệt realized that the Soviet economic model was flawed and secretly promoted trade and manufacturing behind the state's back. Gradually he became one of the staunchest supporters of the reformist faction in the party, many of whom were local party heads and administrators in southern provinces.

In 1982, he was promoted to Deputy chairman of the Council of Ministers (Vice Premier) and became Chairman of the State Planning Commission. In 1987, he was appointed First Deputy Prime Minister of Vietnam and assumed the role of Acting Prime Minister from March to June 1988 after the sudden death of Phạm Hùng. In the tradition of the party's organisation, he should have been made Premier. However, allegedly due to a personal quarrel between Võ Văn Kiệt and Nguyễn Văn Linh - the Secretary General and his longtime superior - as well as opposition from conservative members of the Politburo, Đỗ Mười was chosen instead. In the plenary session of the National Assembly in 1988, however, many delegates nominated him as a second candidate. Even though he got only 35% of votes, this was unprecedented, as elections in the National Assembly had previously had only one candidate and they were essentially just a rubber-stamp of decisions made by the Party Politburo.

After 1975, around 4 million people suffered from food shortages in Saigon. People often had to eat rice stuffed with potatoes and cassava. The reason was that the state reformed private enterprise in the South and monopolized the wholesale stage. This caused the entire network of rice traders and granary owners in the West to be eliminated, replaced by state-owned trading companies. However, the state's buying price at that time was "as low as it was", farmers in the West had rice but refused to sell it. Even if the government has money, it is not allowed to buy rice at the agreed price because it can easily be accused of going against the subsidy policy.

As Secretary of the Ho Chi Minh City Party Committee, Võ Văn Kiệt was then faced with two options: strictly comply with the state's purchasing price or "break the barrier" to find a way to buy rice to save the country.

During the 1978-1979 period, Ho Chi Minh City also faced a shortage of imported sources, causing the input of the entire production to decline, leading to a crisis in goods and labor. Kiệt discussed with city leaders to find ways to "tear down" the import of some necessary raw materials for production.

== Premiership (1991–1997) ==
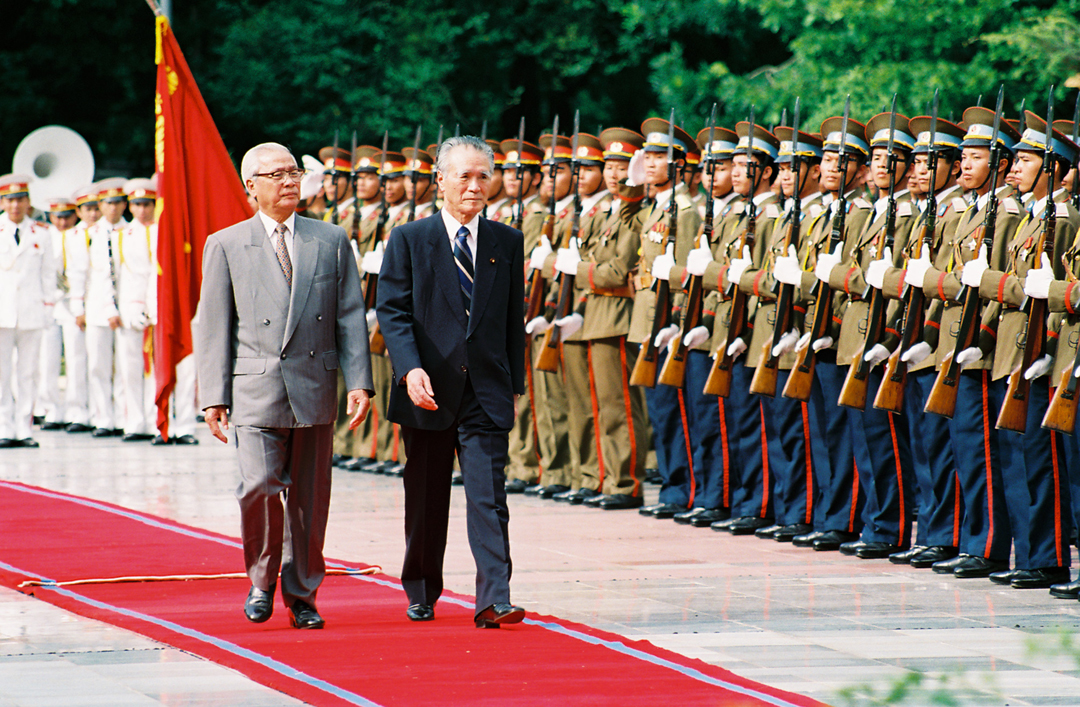
Võ Văn Kiệt and Prime minister of Japan Tomiichi Murayama in 1994

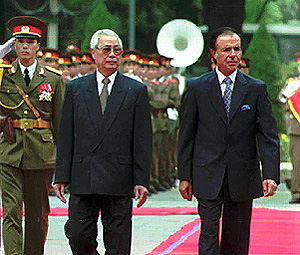
Võ Văn Kiệt and President of Argentina Carlos Menem in 1997

Võ Văn Kiệt took the role of First Vice Premier and continued to push his reform agenda. In 1991, he was elected as Prime Minister, an office he held until 1997. His tenure marked the advance of the administrative branch at the expense of the influence of the Party's institutions, when the power was shared by three top leaders: himself as Prime Minister, General Secretary Đỗ Mười, and President Lê Đức Anh. He initiated a large program of economic reform, reorganised the government and urged the broadening of diplomatic ties. In the early 1990s Vietnam gradually recovered from the economic crisis of the previous decade. In 1995 the country joined the ASEAN community and normalized relations with the US, ending 20 years of formal mutual enmity and American embargo after the fall of Saigon.

In 1986, the reform policy of the Communist Party of Vietnam blew new winds. However, the southern region and Ho Chi Minh City - places with early access to industry - still cannot create a strong breakthrough due to serious electricity shortages due to very limited local sources, and rotating power cuts are daily matter.

The decision to build a 500kV North - South super high voltage line to transmit electricity from North to South, helping the South alleviate its electricity thirst, was officially raised by Võ Văn Kiệt with leaders of the Ministry of Energy during a meal. In 1991, the answer "Can do" by Minister of Energy Vũ Ngọc Hải a week later was also the beginning of a mountain of work that needed to be implemented.

He ordered strict punishment, no matter who that person was or what position he was in. Later, Minister of Energy Vũ Ngọc Hải, who created the North-South 500kV power transmission line project, was convicted of irresponsibility in management and sentenced to three years in prison, as were a number of related officials who were dismissed from their posts. Kiệt announced that if the 500KV line fails, he will automatically resign.

The project was approved by the Politburo in January 1992. On 25 February 1992, the Government approved the economic-technical thesis with a completion time decision of 2 years and due to the emergency period, allowing implementation by survey, design, import of materials and equipment and construction to be carried out in parallel.

After more than 2 years of building the 500kV North - South Line, circuit 1, at exactly 7:00 p.m., 7 minutes and 59 seconds on 27 May 1994, Võ Văn Kiệt ordered the Southern power system to be merged with 4 units of the Hydroelectric Plant Hòa Bình in Đà Nẵng. After this event, many people called him "Electricity Prime Minister", a commander-in-chief of the industry, a leader who laid the foundation and made contributions to a unified electricity grid nationwide, meeting the needs of the entire country. development and economic integration as of today. Kiệt's old decision solved the problem of electricity shortage in the South and promoted economic development. Ho Chi Minh City is the economic development engine of the country.

The conflict between reformist and conservative factions increased and culminated in a series of power struggles in the mid-1990s. Representing the reformists, Võ Văn Kiệt advocated for further privatisation of the state dominated economy, as well as democratization - an approach criticised by his political rivals as dangerous to "socialist orientation". In 1996, after the party could not create a consensus on personnel arrangement, all of the three top leaders remained in their positions. However, factionalism was only intensified and eventually led Võ Văn Kiệt and his opponents Mười and Anh to step down at the same time in 1997. They continued to influence the country affairs as advisors to the Standing Committee of the party until 2001.

== Final years ==
After retiring from politics, Võ Văn Kiệt lived in Ho Chi Minh City. He remained a member of the Advisory Council to the Party's Central Committee until 2001. Since then, he had spoken out on many issues, and was seen as a defender of people's rights.

Võ Văn Kiệt was the highest-ranking former government official to have openly spoken out about reconciliation with Vietnamese exiles and democracy activists. He had spoken out against the proposed expansion of Hanoi and the demolition of the historic National Assembly building in Ba Đình Square to make place for a new one.

== Death and state funeral ==
Võ Văn Kiệt was admitted to Singapore's Mount Elizabeth Hospital on June 3, 2008 and died at the age of 85 on June 11, 2008.

State media did not announce his death until the night of June 12, after most foreign news agencies had already reported it and many foreign dignitaries had already offered condolences, including United Nations Secretary-General Ban Ki-moon. The government of Vietnam announced a state funeral on June 14 and 15 to be held in the Reunification Hall (Ho Chi Minh City), Hanoi, and his birth province Vĩnh Long.

Memorial and burial services at state level for Võ Văn Kiệt were organized in Vietnam's southern Hồ Chí Minh City on Sunday morning June 15, 2008 with the participation of many residents and officials, including the country's top party and state leaders. Thousands of mourners lined the streets of Hồ Chí Minh City for the state funeral of Võ Văn Kiệt.

"The death of former prime minister Võ Văn Kiệt is a great loss to the party, state, people and his family... He had a spirit of daring to think and daring to do. The comrade (Võ Văn Kiệt) and party and state leaders led all people to conduct the renovation cause, bringing our country out of the socioeconomic crisis," Nông Đức Mạnh, General Secretary of the Communist Party of Vietnam Central Committee and head of the funeral board, said at the memorial service televised live by the Central Vietnam Television.

Top Communist Party officials, some wearing black suits and black ties, solemnly stood to attention in the front row of mourners before Võ Văn Kiệt's coffin during the service. Relatives stood in black mourning clothes and white headbands.

The coffin was draped in Vietnam's red flag with a gold star and enclosed in a glass case for transportation on a gun carriage through city streets to the national cemetery for burial.

Tens of thousands of mourners lined the streets to honor Võ Văn Kiệt as his coffin was carried in a procession of military vehicles through Hồ Chí Minh City to be cremated.

The country's political elite paid their respects in Reunification Hall, where Communist Party chief Nông Đức Mạnh headed long lines of mourners who filed past Võ Văn Kiệt's coffin from early Saturday.

As his body lay in state, the palace hall was filled with incense smoke and funeral music played by an army band. Saturday and Sunday were declared days of mourning with flags flying at half-mast at official buildings.

In a statement, current Prime Minister Nguyễn Tấn Dũng paid tribute to Võ Văn Kiệt as "a wholehearted, loyal, irrepressible and heroic revolutionary. All his life, all his heart and all his force was for the country and the people."

Deputy Prime Minister and Foreign Minister Phạm Gia Khiêm told AFP that Võ Văn Kiệt "was very dynamic in setting policy in the renovation period, and I think his contribution will stay with the Vietnamese people forever."

== Eulogy ==
The eulogy for Võ Văn Kiệt was given by communist party leader Nông Đức Mạnh at the Reunification Palace in Hồ Chí Minh City, where his body had been lying in state.

He described Võ Văn Kiệt as "an excellent leader of our party, state and people, a faithful revolutionary fighter who has devoted his whole life for national independence, socialism and people's happiness". Võ Văn Kiệt's flag-draped coffin, carried in a glass case and accompanied by a military procession, was then taken through the streets, where thousands of mourners waited to pay tribute. Vietnam held two days of national mourning. Among the grey ranks of Vietnam's communist leadership, Võ Văn Kiệt was one of few figures to have stood out.

Credited as a leading figure in the economic reforms known as Đổi Mới, which have transformed Vietnam's economy, he was a rarity among senior officials in speaking out publicly against the failings of the economic system. One of his comrades in arms, Trần Quốc Hương, former head of intelligence for the Việt Cộng network in South Vietnam, wrote in the condolence book: "I was deeply moved by your death. You were my comrade, my friend, and my brother."

After the communist victory in 1975 he became party secretary of Saigon, and quietly defied hard-line official policy by trying to work with officials and businesses associated with the defeated government. As prime minister, Võ Văn Kiệt presided over a period of dramatic economic growth and foreign investment.

In an interview with the BBC in 2007 he questioned whether Communist Party members were true patriots, saying: "The motherland of Vietnam doesn't belong to one person, one party or one group only."

In his final weeks, Võ Văn Kiệt also spoke out against the expansion of the capital Hanoi and expressed concern whether Vietnam could protect itself against rising sea levels caused by global warming.

== Legacy ==
Võ Văn Kiệt led Vietnam's economic reform of the 1990s and its reopening to the outside world after decades of isolation. His death raises questions about which way the communist party in Vietnam would move on. There were signs in late 2010s that Võ Văn Kiệt's reformist allies had been losing their influence.

Out of office, since 1997, Võ Văn Kiệt remained active in politics, publishing commentaries pushing for more liberalisation even as Vietnam joined the World Trade Organization in 2007 and averaged annual GDP growth of 7.5 percent since 2000.

== Quotes ==
The motherland belongs to us, the nation belongs to us, the state belongs to us, Vietnam belongs to us, not to communists or any religious group or faction.

When mentioning the [Vietnam] war, a million people feel happy but another million feel miserable.

Preceded by Phạm Hùng	acting Prime Minister of Vietnam; 1988	Succeeded by Đỗ Mười
Preceded by Đỗ Mười	Prime Minister of Vietnam; 1991–1997	Succeeded by Phan Văn Khải
