= Cao Lãnh city =

Former provincial city of Đồng Tháp province in Vietnam

Cao Lãnh
- Provincial city (Class-2)
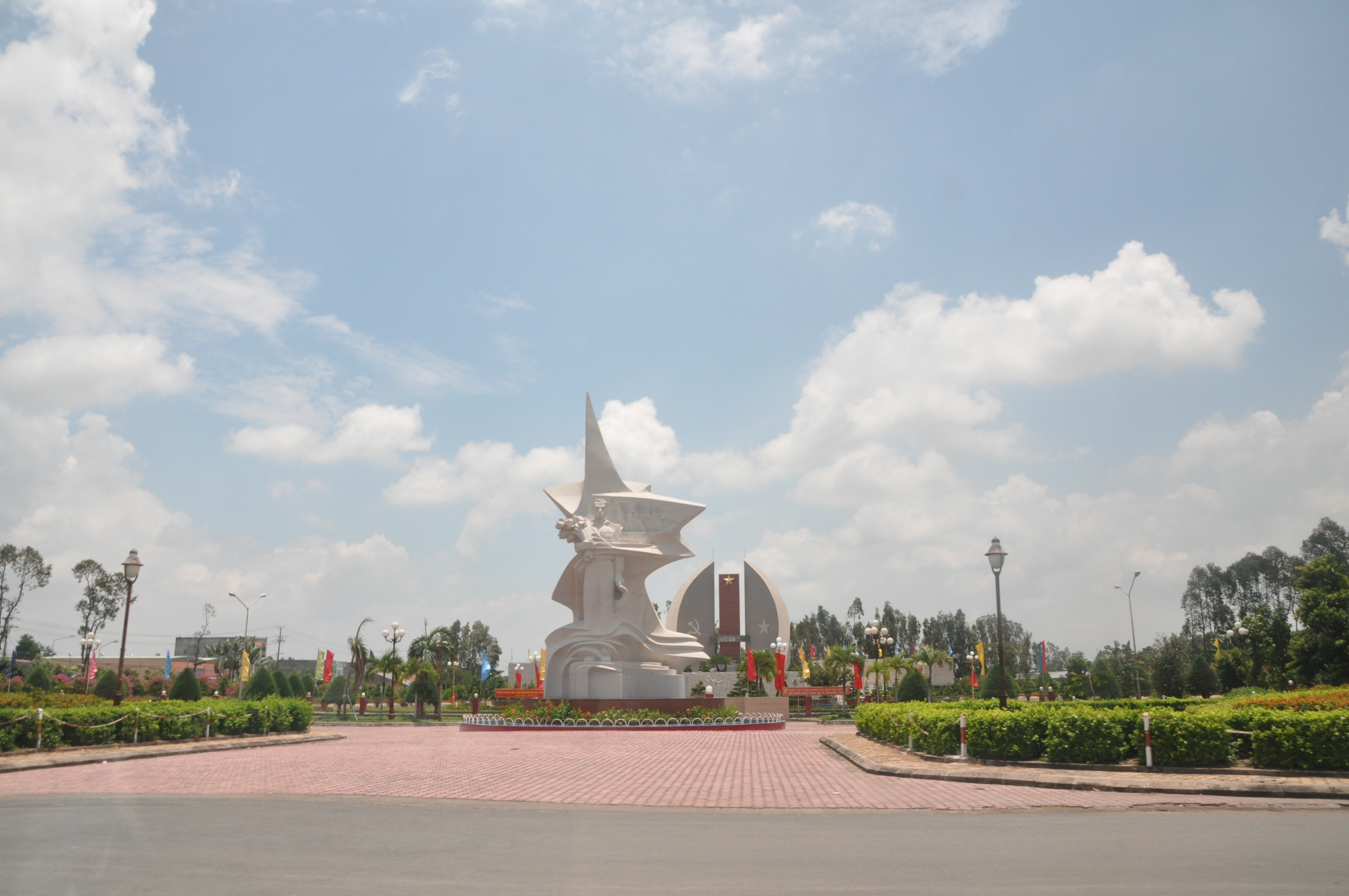
- Interactive map of Cao Lãnh
- Location of in Vietnam
- Coordinates: 10°28′2″N 105°37′49″E
- Country: Vietnam
- Province: Đồng Tháp

Area
  - Total: 107 km^{2} (41 sq mi)

Population (2018)
  - Total: 211,912
  - Density: 1,976/km^{2} (5,120/sq mi)
- Time zone: UTC+7 (Indochina Time)
- Climate: Aw

Cao Lãnh (Vietnamese: [kaːw˧ lajŋ̟˧˨˧] ; Vietnamese is the former capital city of Đồng Tháp Province, Vietnam. It is located at around 10°28′2″N 105°37′49″E.

== Origin of the place name ==
The name Cao Lãnh originates from the earlier term “Câu Lãnh,” in which “Câu” refers to the old village title “câu đương,” a local official responsible for assisting with minor legal matters, maintaining order, and carrying out administrative tasks, while “Lãnh” was the personal name of a man named Đỗ Công Tường; people therefore called him “Ông Câu Lãnh” (Mr. Lãnh, the câu đương), and the market he established became known as “Chợ Câu Lãnh,” which over time was gradually transformed in pronunciation into “Cao Lãnh,” eventually becoming the official name of the area.

== History ==
During the French colonial period Cao Lãnh found some supporters for the nationalist appeal of Trần Huy Liệu's Đông Pháp Thời Báo (Indochina Times) founded in May 1923. Later, in the initial resistance to the French in 1945, the Việt Nam Quốc Dân Đảng and others in the South merged to form the Third Division of the popular army. Cao Lãnh was where the troops were reorganized into 23 units each of 500-600 men.

Prior to 1975, Cao Lãnh was the capital of Kiến Phong province, in the Mekong Delta region of South Vietnam. In February 1976, Kiến Phong was merged with Sa Đéc Province to become Đồng Tháp Province. Sa Đéc became the capital city of the new province. Cao Lãnh replaced Sa Đéc as the capital on April 24, 1994, and became a city in October 2007.

== Geography ==
Climate data for Cao Lãnh
Month	Jan	Feb	Mar	Apr	May	Jun	Jul	Aug	Sep	Oct	Nov	Dec	Year
Record high °C (°F)	35.2 (95.4)	35.1 (95.2)	36.7 (98.1)	39.0 (102.2)	38.5 (101.3)	37.5 (99.5)	35.0 (95.0)	35.6 (96.1)	34.9 (94.8)	33.4 (92.1)	33.8 (92.8)	33.5 (92.3)	39.0 (102.2)
Mean daily maximum °C (°F)	30.0 (86.0)	31.1 (88.0)	32.8 (91.0)	33.9 (93.0)	33.3 (91.9)	32.1 (89.8)	31.6 (88.9)	31.3 (88.3)	31.1 (88.0)	30.6 (87.1)	30.2 (86.4)	29.6 (85.3)	31.5 (88.7)
Daily mean °C (°F)	25.4 (77.7)	26.1 (79.0)	27.5 (81.5)	28.7 (83.7)	28.4 (83.1)	27.7 (81.9)	27.3 (81.1)	27.4 (81.3)	27.5 (81.5)	27.4 (81.3)	27.1 (80.8)	25.8 (78.4)	27.2 (81.0)
Mean daily minimum °C (°F)	22.2 (72.0)	22.5 (72.5)	23.9 (75.0)	25.2 (77.4)	25.5 (77.9)	25.1 (77.2)	24.8 (76.6)	25.0 (77.0)	25.1 (77.2)	25.0 (77.0)	24.8 (76.6)	23.0 (73.4)	24.3 (75.7)
Record low °C (°F)	16.1 (61.0)	18.1 (64.6)	15.8 (60.4)	20.0 (68.0)	21.7 (71.1)	21.5 (70.7)	21.9 (71.4)	19.0 (66.2)	21.1 (70.0)	21.3 (70.3)	19.5 (67.1)	16.8 (62.2)	15.8 (60.4)
Average rainfall mm (inches)	10.3 (0.41)	7.6 (0.30)	19.8 (0.78)	60.3 (2.37)	140.9 (5.55)	168.2 (6.62)	186.1 (7.33)	177.6 (6.99)	239.1 (9.41)	279.6 (11.01)	145.9 (5.74)	42.9 (1.69)	1,481.1 (58.31)
Average rainy days	2.0	0.9	1.9	4.9	14.4	16.6	18.2	18.1	19.4	20.6	12.5	5.6	136.0
Average relative humidity (%)	81.8	80.6	78.3	79.0	83.5	85.1	85.8	85.8	85.4	85.3	82.6	81.2	82.8
Mean monthly sunshine hours	255.7	248.6	269.4	258.9	220.3	186.6	188.2	187.3	172.8	189.3	212.7	230.4	2,617.7
Source: Vietnam Institute for Building Science and Technology
