= Vân Đài =

Vietnamese poet

Vân Ðài
- Born: Ðào Thị Nguyệt Minh; January 29, 1903; Hanoi, Vietnam
- Died: 1964 (aged 60–61); Hanoi, Vietnam
- Occupation: Poet
- Writing career
- Pen name: Nữ Sĩ Vân Đài, Vân Ðài, Van Dai, Van-Dai
- Language: Vietnamese
- Period: 1913–1964
- Notable work: Mùa hái quả (The Fruit Picking Season) 1964
- Movement: Thơ mới ("New Poetry")

Ðào Thị Nguyệt Minh (January 29, 1903 – 1964), known by the pseudonym Vân Ðài, was a Vietnamese poet. Well known as one of Vietnam's primary female poets, Vân Ðài's work is also closely associated with the Resistance during the Vietnam War. In 1943 Vân Ðài published Hương Xuân, the first women's poetry collection in quốc ngữ (the Vietnamese alphabet), together with Hằng Phương, Mộng Tuyết, and Anh Thơ. Vân Ðài was selected by the editorial board of Feminist Publishing House of New York City University as one of the pioneer poets of the New Poetry style.

== Life and career ==
=== Early life ===
Nữ Sĩ Vân Đài, Đào Thị Nguyệt Minh was born on January 29, 1904 (Giáp Thìn, Dragon year) in Hà Nội. The Đào family on Hàng Trống street were famous in the artistic community for their daughters' talents.

At the age of ten, thanks to her mother's teaching and guidance on verse and poetry, she became famous in the poetry culture of Việtnam. She came to be known as Vân Đài, poetess (nữ sĩ Vân Đài) of the pre-war period (thời tiền chiến).

=== Pre-war period, first marriage ===
Vân Đài began studies at Đồng Khánh Teacher Training School at the same time as well-known poet Tương Phố. She left the teaching profession to marry Huỳnh Kim Vinh, a veterinary surgeon who studied in Hà Nội. Together they moved to Trà Vinh, a southern province of Vietnam, and then settled in Saigon. Her husband died a few years later. Back in Hà Nội, she devoted herself to writing poems and short stories for the many newspapers and magazines of Phụ Nữ Tân Văn, Phong Hóa, Ngày Nay, Tinh Hoa, Đàn Bà, and Tri Tân.

=== Second marriage, Hà Nội, from 1954 ===
As a resistance partisan and participant during the long-lasting struggle against the colonial regime and hard evacuation campaign for Việt Bắc, Vân Đài volunteered as Head of the Dục Anh Association (Hội Dục Anh) where she helped to take care of hundreds of orphans.

She remarried Nguyễn Vǎn Tường, a telecommunications engineer.

In 1954, Việtnam was temporarily divided into two zones as a result of the Geneva Agreements. Vân Đài's husband and his family would not leave Hà Nội, so she started to teach literature at Hà Nội University. Her poetry was published in the newspapers of Phụ Nữ Việtnam, Vǎn Học.

=== Death ===
At the end of the summer of 1964, Vân Đài died in a small house beside the West Lake (Hồ Tây), close to Quan Thánh Pagoda, Hà Nội. Her friends and fellow poets, Anh Thơ, Hằng Phương, Thanh Phương, and Cẩm Thạch, attended her funeral.

In December 2012, The People's Council of Đà Nẵng City decided to name Vân Đài Street after the poet in a new residential area."bếp từ"

== Published works ==
Vân Đài's most popular works were inspired by the mountainous areas where she traveled. She also published women’s household teaching books. Her last poem was Mùa Hái Quả (The Fruit - Picking Season), published by the Writer Association of Việt Nam in 1963.

Some books that she published were:

- Thanh Lịch (Elegance, teaching book)
- Làm bếp giỏi (Be Good Cook, teaching book)
- Hương Xuân (Spring Scent, selected poems, collaborated with Hằng Phương, Anh Thơ and Mộng Tuyết, Nguyễn Du Publisher in 1943)
- Làm Bánh (Pastries, teaching book, collaborated with Nguyễn Xiễn, Phụ Nữ Publisher in 1958)

=== Short stories ===
==== Prewar period ====
- Thằng Khạ Mú (Short story of highland-dweller Kha Mu in the weekly magazine Women)
- Tôi sang Lào (I travel in Laos)
- Bốn nǎm trên Đảo Cát Bà (Four years living in Cát Bà Island)
- Cô gái Phou-Thai (Short story of Phou-Thai Girl, 1941)

==== Other stories ====
- "Thằng Khạ Mú" (Short story of highland-dweller Kha Mu in the weekly magazine Women)
- "Cô gái Phou-Thai" (Short story of Phou-Thai Girl, 1941)
- Excerpts from Vân Đài's Selected Poems which were mostly the pre-war era 1930 - 1940 published by Phụ Nữ Tân Văn, Sprint edition 1933

=== Poetry ===
==== Collections ====
- Về quê Mẹ (Return to the Maternal Village) 1961
- Những người mẹ năm tốt (Five - Deeds Mothers) 1962
- Mùa hái quả (The Fruit Picking Season) 1964

==== Poems published in Phụ nữ tân văn, Phong Hóa, Ngày nay, and Tinh hoa magazines ====
- "Đêm tàn" (The End of Night)
- "Cảm hai giọt lệ" (Between Tears) Tri Tân No.135, 23/3/1944
- "Chú hải quân" (Navy Soldier)
- "Chiều quê" (Countryside Evening) Tri Tân No.139, 20/4/1944
- "Chiều thu" (Autumn Evening)
- "Lên đường" (Departure)
- "Ngẫu đề" (By Sudden Creation) Tri Tân No.138, 23/3/1944
- "Qua cảnh cũ" (Back to ancient land)
- "Tả cảnh" (Landscape Description)
- "Từ khúc" (Farewell Verse)
- "Thuyền đi" (leaving Boat)
- "Tiếng đêm" (Night Sound)
- "Họa 10 bài Khuê phụ thán của Thượng Tân Thị" (Replying to 10 poems of Sole Woman's Wishes Poems of Thượng Tân Thị)

== Tribute ==
Vǎn Học magazine No. 129 (June 1, 1971) in Sàigòn was a special edition paying tribute to Vân Đài and featured her portrait on the cover. Main articles included:

- "Vân Đài Thân Thế và Văn Nghiệp" (Vân Đài's Biography and Works) by Phan Thục Uyên, writer, Sàigòn 1971
- "Vân Đài, Bạn tôi" (Vân Đài, my Friend) by Thượng Sỹ, writer, Winter 1966
- "Nhớ Chị Vân Đài" (Remembering Sister Vân Đài) by Anh Thơ, poet, West Lake, Spring 1968
- "Vài Kỹ niệm về Vân Đài" (Some Souvenirs on Vân Đài) by Bàng Bá Lân, writer and poet, October 1963
