= Phan Lương Cầm =

Vietnamese scientist (1943–2025)

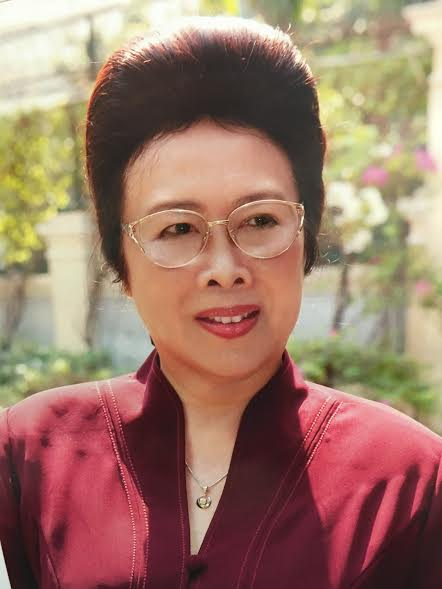
- Born: 5 March 1943; Huế, Annam, French Indochina
- Died: 9 April 2025 (aged 82)
- Spouse: Võ Văn Kiệt
- Awards: Kovalevskaya Award; Labor Medal
- Scientific career
- Fields: Electrochemistry and Corrosion
- Institutions: The Vietnam Corrosion and Metal Protection Association, Hanoi University of Technology

Notes
- Other offices held: Spouse of the Prime Minister of Vietnam (1991–1997); President of the Vietnam Corrosion and Metal Protection Association (1996–2005); President of the Asian-Pacific Materials and Corrosion Association (1999–2001)

Phan Lương Cầm (5 March 1943 – 9 April 2025) was a Vietnamese scientist and academic in the fields of Electrochemistry and Corrosion, widow of former Prime Minister of Vietnam Võ Văn Kiệt.

== Academic and scientific work ==
Phan Lương Cầm was born in Hue City, Thừa Thiên-Huế Province, Vietnam. In 1965, Phan Lương Cầm worked as an associate professor at the Hanoi University of Technology, Vietnam. In 1968 Cầm arrived in the former Soviet Union and studied at the Moscow State University. She also used to be a pianist when she was younger (approximately at 7–10 years old) There, she was awarded a Ph.D for her thesis in the fields of Electrochemistry and Corrosion. On her return to Vietnam in early 1973, she resumed her academic post at the Hanoi University of Technology.

Phan led scientific works, including scientific research theses and programs at the national level, international cooperation research project such as VH-8 Project Corrosion in cooperation with the Netherlands from 1980. She has published several books, many journal and conference papers and her works have been cited many times. She was also author of a number of patents, innovations and creative solutions.

Phan was a founder and director of the Corrosion and Protection Research Center – Hanoi University of Technology – from 1996 to 2008, the year when she retired.

She was the first woman Professor at the Hanoi University of Technology, She was also one of the co-founders and president of the Vietnam Corrosion and Metal Protection Association (VICORRA) from 1996 to 2005, and she was its honorary president. It was the first time a woman ever served as president of an association under the Vietnam Union of Science and Technology Associations (VUSTA).

She was president of the Asian Pacific Materials and Corrosion Association from 1999 to 2001; Chairwoman of the 11th Asian Pacific Corrosion Control Conference (APCCC-11) held in Ho Chi Minh City in 1999 and member of the International Advisory Board for many other Asian Pacific Corrosion Control Conferences.

== Charity and social work ==
Phan was actively involved in charity and social work, especially in the field of education i.e. helping students who are too poor to attend college after being admitted to a college. Besides donating scholarships, she helped students facing life hardships through their college years.

== Personal life and death ==
Phan was married to Võ Văn Kiệt, Prime Minister of Vietnam. She died on 9 April 2025, at the age of 82.

== Awards and honours ==
Phan was presented with the 1995 Kovalevskaya Award, Labor Medal and various Certificates of Merits in recognition of her contributions to the cause of education, science and technology, women’s advancement and children’s protection.

== Selected bibliography ==
- Phan Lương Cam; W.A. Schultze (1985). Corrosion Science. Bach Khoa Publishers.
- Phan Lương Cam (1967). Fundamentals of Inorganic Chemistry. Bach Khoa Publishers.
- Phan Lương Cam (1978). Corrosion Dictionary. Bach Khoa Publishers.
- Phan Lương Cam (1978). References on Electrochemistry. Bach Khoa Publishers.
- Phan Lương Cam (1986). Electrochemistry for Lab Tests. Bach Khoa Publishers.
- Phan Lương Cam (1999). Procedure on Anti Corrosion for Offshore Oil and Gas Works in Vietnam. Bach Khoa Publishers.
