= Collapse of Cần Thơ Bridge =

2007 construction accident in Vietnam

Cần Thơ Bridge incident
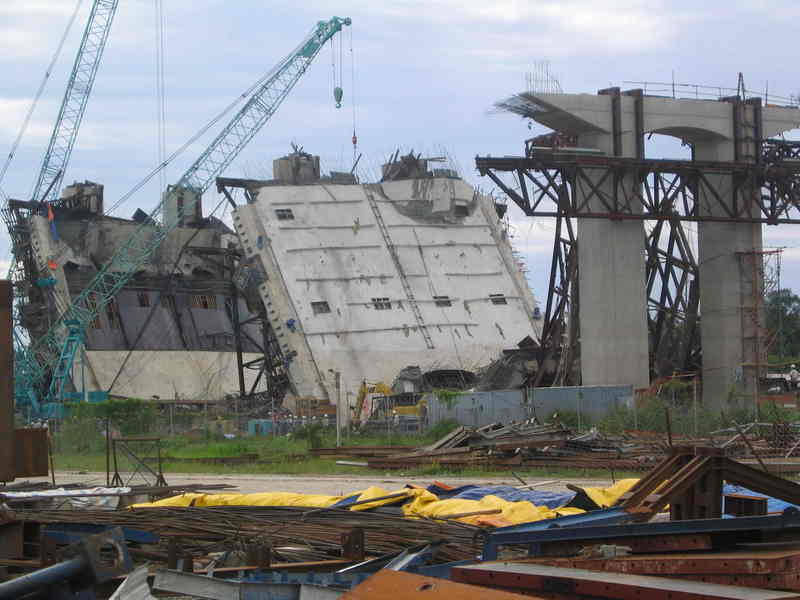
- Site of the collapsed part of Can Tho Bridge.
- Date: 26 September 2007; 18 years ago
- Time: 8:00 (UTC+07:00)
- Venue: Pillars P13, P14 and P15 Cần Thơ Bridge
- Location: Bình Minh, Vĩnh Long, Vietnam; 10°02′16″N 105°48′59″E
- Type: Work accident; Construction collapse
- Deaths: 55
- Injuries: 80
- Missing: 1

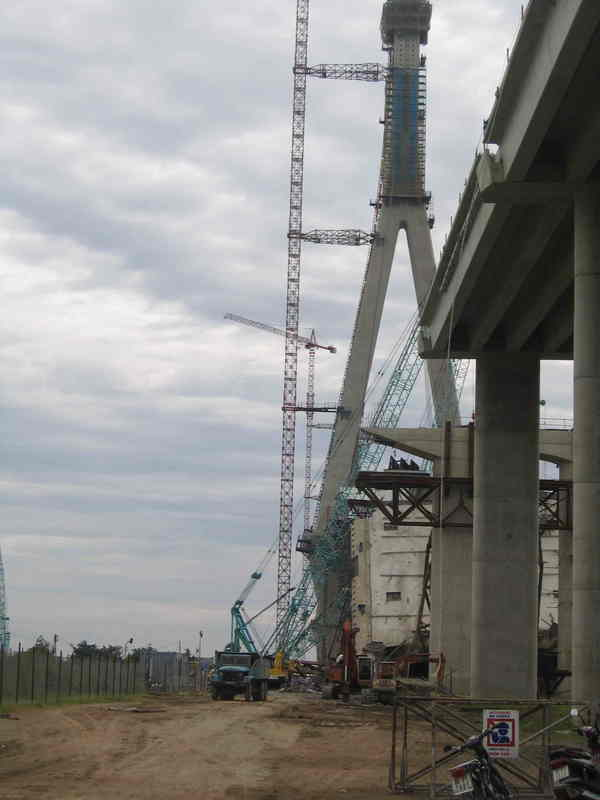
Accident site as seen from another side.

The collapse of Cần Thơ Bridge was a severe construction accident in southern Vietnam in September 2007. A 90-metre (300 ft) section of an approach ramp fell more than 30 metres (98 ft), killing and injuring dozens of people. The number of casualties remains unclear. Shortly after the accident one source stated that there were 52 people dead and 140 injured; other sources have shown a death toll reaching 59. Dr. Trần Chủng, head of the national construction QA/QC authority under the Ministry of Construction of Vietnam, described it as the most catastrophic disaster in the history of Vietnam's construction industry, to which Ho Nghia Dung, Minister of Transport, agreed.

Dung apologized for the collapse of the bridge. Meeting with reporters on Saturday, September 29, 2007, he said, "This is the most serious problem and workplace accident in the transport sector. I apologize to all people, victims, and the victims' families."

He further suggested that the main responsibility for the collapse lay with the contractor, and that he would consider resigning once the official determination of the accident's cause was made by the relevant Vietnamese authorities.

== Cần Thơ Bridge ==
Cần Thơ Bridge is a cable-stayed bridge over the Hậu (Bassac) River, the largest distributary of the Mekong River. The 2.75 kilometres (1.71 mi) four-lane bridge is located in Bình Minh Town, Vĩnh Long Province, opposite Cái Răng District, Cần Thơ, Mekong Delta, approximately 170 kilometres (110 mi) south of Ho Chi Minh City. Prime Minister Phan Văn Khải launched its construction on September 25, 2004; it was scheduled to be completed at the end of 2008, but was not opened to traffic until April, 2010. The bridge was built to replace the ferry system that ran along National Route 1, linking Vĩnh Long Province and Cần Thơ city. The estimated construction cost was 4,832 billion vietnamese đồng (approximately US$342.6 million). It was built under the supervision of consultant Nippon Koei-Chodai, which was working with Japanese contractors, including the Taisei Corporation, Kajima Construction and Nippon Steel. Capital for the project was provided by the Japan International Cooperation Agency, which received official development assistance loans from the Japan Bank of International Cooperation and the Vietnamese government.

== Collapse ==
At 8 am local time (GMT+7) on Wednesday, September 26, 2007, a 90-metre (300 ft) steel-and-concrete section of an approach ramp, which was over 30 metres (98 ft) above the ground, collapsed onto a small island near the Vinh Long side of the river. There were about 250 engineers and workers on or under the span at the time of the collapse. Said Manh Hung, a construction team leader, “we suddenly heard a great explosion at a bridge-head. Dust covered a great air space while workers screamed out. The scene was so terrible. The whole great block of concrete fell on people below.” Initial news accounts indicated that about 50 men had been killed, 100 or more had been injured, and that others might be trapped under debris.

== Rescue ==
Immediately following the accident, workers at the site joined rescue forces in digging out and evacuating the injured. Local people, students, cadres, and 30 Japanese and Filipino volunteers also joined in the effort, while Chợ Rẫy Hospital in Ho Chi Minh City sent two professional rescue teams to the site. The combined rescue effort - including forces from the Ministries of National Defence, Public Health, and Public Security, as well as volunteers - was placed under the direction of Hoàng Trung Hải, Vice Premier of the Government.

The rescue effort received international support. The American Chamber of Commerce in Vietnam sent resources located in Ho Chi Minh City, Singapore, and Bangkok to Cần Thơ. The International SOS alarm centre and clinic in Ho Chi Minh City sent a first response team of three doctors, a nurse, an interpreter, and an operations manager. Rescue efforts were carried out with cranes, rather than by direct entry of rescue personnel, due to the danger of the collapse of remaining portions of the ramp. Thirty professional rescuers from Japan and the Philippines were dispatched to the accident site to participate in the rescue effort. Lưu Thành Đồng, vice director of Cần Thơ Public Transportation Service (Sở Giao thông Công chánh) stated to BBC Vietnam that "as long there is hope of survivors, the rescue efforts will continue." Four days after the accident, on Saturday, September 29, rescue efforts were suspended, as the likelihood of finding further survivors was considered very low.

== Causes of the accident ==
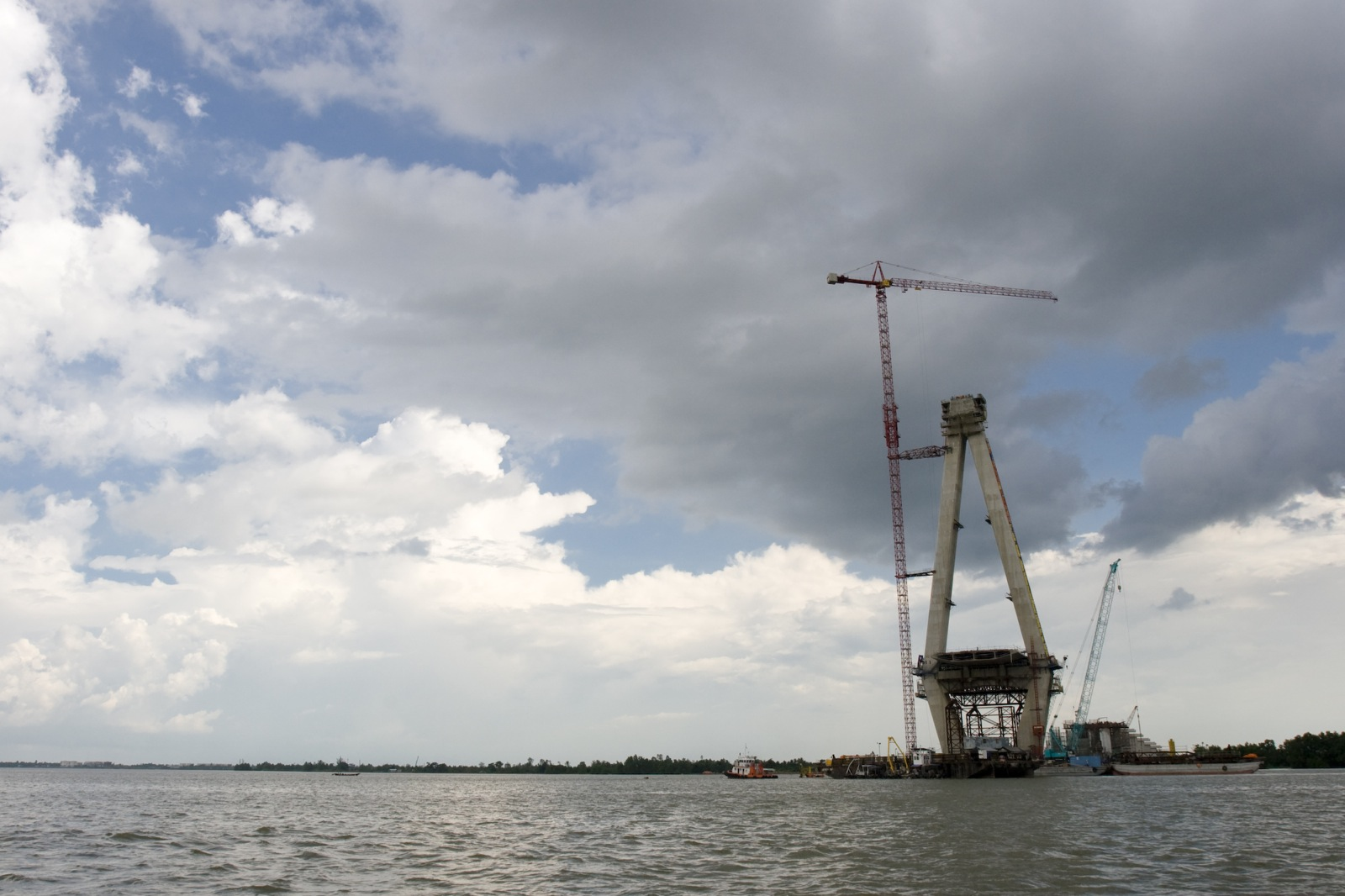
Bridge tower construction, as of June 2007.

The Ministries of Transport and of Public Security created an investigative team, led by lieutenant-general Phạm Nam Tào, head of the Police Division of the Ministry of Public Security, to determine the cause of the collapse. Several possibilities were forwarded:

- Reuters reported that officials had said recent heavy rains might have softened the foundations.
- Dr. Trần Chủng, head of the national construction QA/QC authority under the Ministry of Construction of Vietnam, suggested that the collapse might have been caused by the movement of temporary pillar while concrete supports - poured just for two days earlier - were not sufficiently stable.
- Minister of Transport Ho Nghia Dung said that the sinking of the temporary pillars, which had to bear a 6000 metric ton concrete structure, might have caused the collapse; he told reporters,"...Preliminary information has shown that there have been signs of settlement of the foundation of the temporary pillars."
- Other sources suggested that there had been landslides near the river shore which had displaced and destabilized the temporary pillar.

Long before the collapse, on 12 January, a Japanese construction consultant, Hiroshi Kudo, had recommended specific measures for installing the temporary pillars, and that load tests for the piling should be carried out in accordance with international standards and codes. According to Kudo, the loading capacity of the temporary pillars, as per the detailed design proposed by the contractors, met just 15% of the required loading. He remarked that:

- The contractors had multiplied the pile overloading ratio by 1.15 instead of 1.25 in accordance with the American standard or 1.35 in accordance with the Japanese standard;
- When calculating the wind force on the temporary piles, the contractors had applied a wind force of 0.5 kPa (0.073 psi), which was too low; it should have been 2.5 kPa (0.36 psi). (According to NCE.co.uk, 2.5 is the coefficient for the wind loading .)

He had therefore required the contractors to redo their temporary pile and shoring designs.

Top officials of the Japanese contracting companies flew to Vietnam and made bows in a meeting to apologize to the victims and their families. Hayama Kanji, Chairman of the Taisei Corporation, said in a meeting with Vietnamese authorities: "I sincerely express my deepest apology to the people and the government of Vietnam".

On March 6, 2008, Minister of Construction Nguyen Hong Quan released a report containing the results of the eight-month-long investigation into the accident at a press conference in Hanoi. The sinking of the bridge's makeshift foundation was pinpointed as the primary reason for the collapse, the report said. The dipping phenomenon caused the bridge support to tumble, breaking two bridge spans. The report added the sinking of the foundation was an "unfortunate situation and hard to project in the design process."

== Casualties ==
In the days immediately following the collapse of the Can Tho bridge, reports of the number of men killed, injured, and missing varied widely:

- According to Vietnam News Agency and CNN, 52 people dead and 149 injured.
- According to Vietnam Net, 49 corpses have been found and 181 people injured.
- According to Thanh Nien and VnExpress, 37 people dead and 87 injured, not including those not yet recovered from the debris.
- According to Tuổi Trẻ, 52 people dead, 97 injured and several survivors trapped in the debris. However, this newspaper stated 37 dead on 27 September 2007.
- According to BBC, 36 dead, nevertheless, Reuters quoted a Chinese subcontractor as saying 60 dead.
- According to the newspaper Tien Phong, 59 dead, 97 injured and still 70 trapped under the debris.

The Vietnamese government has since established that 54 men died in the accident, and 80 were seriously injured.

== Memorial ==
The American Chamber of Commerce in Vietnam had a "Benefit Performance Memorial" that was held on September 30, 2007. It was open to the public, at the HCMC Military Zone 7 Stadium, and was held to help raise funds for the victims' families. The memorial had singers such as Phuong Thanh and Siu Black perform to raise money.

== Legal actions ==
On October 2, 2007, the Ministry of Public Security of Vietnam began proceedings to determine the liability of individuals and organizations involved in the Can Tho bridge project for prosecution in accordance with Article 229 of the Penal Code of the S.R. Vietnam ("Violation of construction regulations leading to severe consequences"). On the same day, Vĩnh Long Police signed a prosecution decision (Decision no. 29) against some of the sub-contractors. According to the local police, their investigations showed that contractors had removed temporary shoring sooner than instructed in detailed engineering plans, which broke the structure and led to a "domino effect" collapse. Some testimonies also indicated that subcontractors had used poor quality shoring worn out from several previous uses.

== See also ==
- List of bridge failures
- Quebec Bridge, collapsed during construction on August 29, 1907, killing 76 workers
