= Mộng Tuyết =

Vietnamese poet

Mộng Tuyết (1914 in Hà Tiên – 2007), real name Thái Thị Úc was a Vietnamese poet. She married the poet Đông Hồ.

In 1943 she published Hương Xuân, the first poetry collection by women poets in quốc ngữ, together with Hằng Phương, Vân Đài and Anh Thơ.
