= Paul Lê Đắc Trọng =

- Titular bishop of Igilgili
- Church: Catholic Church
- See: Titular see of Igilgili
- In office: 1994–2009
- Predecessor: Antuvan Marovitch
- Successor: Current
- Previous post: Priest

Orders
- Ordination: April 1, 1948

Personal details
- Born: June 15, 1918 Kim Lam, French Indochina
- Died: September 7, 2009 (aged 91)

Paul Lê Đắc Trọng (Hanoi, June 15, 1918 – September 7, 2009) was a Vietnamese bishop of the Catholic Church.

Trong was born in Kim Lâm, Thanh Oai, Hanoi French Indochina, ordained a priest on April 1, 1948, appointed auxiliary bishop of archdiocese of Hanoi, along with titular bishop of Igilgili (Titular Episcopal See of Igilgili, Algeria), on March 23, 1994, and consecrated bishop on August 15, 1994. Trong retired from the Archdiocese of Hanoi on January 21, 2006, at age 87.

== See also ==
- Archdiocese of Hanoi
