= Phạm Tiến Duật =

Vietnamese poet (1941–2007)

Phạm Tiến Duật (14 January 1941 in Thanh Ba, Phú Thọ – 4 December 2007) was a Vietnamese poet. His best known poems include the war poem White circle.
