= Điện Bàn =

- Ward
- Location in Vietnam
- Coordinates: 15.889049057249498°N 108.2562128408357°E
- Country: Vietnam
- Region: South Central Coast and Central Highlands
- Municipality: Da Nang
- Administrative headquarters: 22 Hoàng Diệu Street, Kim Thành Residential Group

Area
  - Total: 19.78 km^{2} (7.64 sq mi)

Population (2025)
  - Total: 41,270
  - Density: 2,086/km^{2} (5,400/sq mi)
- Website: dienban.danang.gov.vn

Điện Bàn is a ward in the municipality of Da Nang, Vietnam. The ward inherited its name from the former town of Điện Bàn, Quảng Nam province.

On 16 June 2025:

- District-level administrative units nationwide were dissolved.
- The entire area and population of Điện Phương, Điện Minh, and Vĩnh Điện wards, formerly part of Điện Bàn town in Quảng Nam province, were merged to form a new ward named Điện Bàn.
