= Hoàng Châu Ký =

Vietnamese playwright

Hoàng Châu Ký (May 16, 1921 - January 31, 2008) from (Cẩm Kim; 1921 in Hội An, Quảng Nam, Đà Nẵng) was a cultural activist, revolutionary, writer, and researcher of Vietnamese folk theater. He was the first principal of the National Traditional Theatre School of Vietnam (now the Hanoi Academy of Theatre and Cinema), former General Secretary of the Vietnam Association of Theatre Artists, and former Director of the Institute of Theatre under the Ministry of Culture. He made significant contributions to the research, preservation, development, and promotion of the art of tuồng. His daughter is the poet Ý Nhi. He was an academic authority on tuồng drama, in addition to setting new works such as a tuồng version of Pierre Corneille's Le Cid with Jean Claude Bourbault.
