= Anh Thơ =

Vietnamese poet

Anh Thơ (Ninh Giang, Hải Dương Province, 25 January 1921 – 14 March 2005), real name Vương Kiều Ân, was a Vietnamese poet whose work focused on women, especially their role in the Viet Minh.

In 1943, she published Hương Xuân, the first poetry collection by women poets in quốc ngữ, together with Hằng Phương, Vân Đài and Mộng Tuyết.

== Early life ==
Anh Tho was born in Hai Duong province. Birthplace: Bac Ninh province. Her father was a Confucian who passed the baccalaureate and worked as a civil servant for France, so he had to relocate many times. Anh Tho therefore had to change schools from Hai Duong to Thai Binh and then back to Bac Giang, before she could complete primary school. At first, she took the pen name Hong Anh, then changed it to Anh Tho.

Anh Tho composed at an early age at 17. She received the consolation prize from Tu Luc Van Doan [Self-Reliant Literary Association] with the poetry collection named "Painting of the countryside." After that, she wrote articles for Dong Tay newspaper and a few other newspapers.

She did not attend much of traditional public school, but expressed interest in literature from an early age, partly influenced by her maternal family, also a Confucian family. Anh Tho, on the other hand, had to live a cramped, constricting life of a girl who grew up in a Confucian family.

== Career ==
In the midst of the "New Poetry" movement being active, Anh Tho looked to poetry as a way of liberation and self-affirmation of the value of women in contemporary society. Since 1931, Anh Tho has published poetry. The first collection of poems - Paintings of the countryside (1941) - consists of 45 poems, which are rural scenes arranged in sequence of four seasons and described with a unique and sensitive observation. This can be seen as the opening poem for a separate trend in the New Poetry movement: focusing all of its inspiration on the village landscape, reviving the millennial beauty of the Vietnamese countryside. These seemingly objective nature paintings seem to contain the desire to live and love rooted in the spirit of a young girl who wants to get out of the heavy bondage of contemporary society. Before 1945, she also wrote a novel about the status of a woman (Black Teeth, 1943) and two collections of poems with other authors (Ou - 1943 and Huong Xuan - 1944.

Near the August Revolution, Anh Tho joined the Viet Minh in 1945, served as Secretary of the Women's Union of 4 districts at that time: Viet Yen, Luc Ngan, Bac Son, Huu Lung (Bac Giang province), standing member Provincial Women's Union of two provinces Bac Giang and Lang Son. Her poetry at this time talked a lot about the feelings and images of women in the rear, especially the woman in the cadres who bravely overcame grief, loss and separation, bearing the silent sacrifices, contributing to the victory of the nation.

During the years of anti-Americanism, Anh Tho expanded the themes and emotions in her poetry, talking about the beauty of a new life, the heroism of Vietnamese people, especially of the common woman.

She was one of the first members of the Vietnam Writers Association (1957), a member of the Executive Committee of the Vietnam Writers Association (1st and 2nd term). From 1971 to 1975 she worked as editor of New Works magazine. She is also a standing member of the Vietnam Union of Literature and Arts. She died in Hanoi from lung cancer. The poet Anh Tho was posthumously awarded the Ho Chi Minh Prize for Literature and Art in 2007.

== Works ==
- Bức tranh quê ("Country", 1939)
- Xưa ("Old", 1942)
- Răng đen ("Black Tooth" novel, 1943)
- Hương xuân ("Perfume of Spring" collaboration, 1944)
- Kể chuyện Vũ Lăng (1957)
- Theo cánh chim câu ("According to the Bird", 1960)
- Ðảo ngọc ("The Pearl", 1964)
- Hoa dứa trắng ("White pineapple", 1967)
- Quê chồng (1979)
- Lệ sương (1995)
- Hồi ký Anh Thơ (Memoris, 2002 3 Vol)
