= Trần Văn Thọ =

Vietnamese painter

Trần Văn Thọ (1917 - 2004) was a Vietnamese painter based in Hanoi who became known in the 1950s for his silk painting. He studied at the École des Beaux-Arts de l'Indochine in Hanoi. Aside from silk, he also painted in gouache and water colours.
