= Ngô Xuân Quýnh =

Vietnamese footballer (1932–2005)

Personal information
- Date of birth: 16 March 1933
- Place of birth: Nghệ An, French Indochina
- Date of death: 25 December 2005 (aged 72)
- Place of death: Hanoi, Vietnam
- Height: 1.68 m (5 ft 6 in)
- Position: Midfielder

Youth career
- 1954: Thể Công

Senior career*
Years	Team	Apps	(Gls)
1954–1966	Thể Công	42	(9)
- * Club domestic league appearances and goals

Ngô Xuân Quýnh (16 March 1933 – 25 December 2005) was a Vietnamese football player and manager.

== Early life ==
Ngô was born on 16 March 1933 in Nghệ An, French Indochina and is a native of the province. Growing up, he played football with his friends using grapefruits as balls and attended the Army Academy in Vietnam.

== Career ==
Ngô spent his entire playing career with Vietnamese side Thể Công and was part of the club's first squad, helping them win three league titles. In 1967, he was appointed as a youth manager of Thể Công.

Vietnamese newspaper Báo Dân Trí wrote in 2005 that he was "an extremely enthusiastic football contributor for newspapers... revered by other sports journalists as a "living dictionary of Vietnamese football"". After retiring from professional football, he worked as Vice President of the Vietnam Football Federation.

== Personal life ==
On 25 December 2005, Ngô died in Hanoi, Vietnam and was the father of Vietnamese football commentator Ngô Quang Tùng.
