= Nguyễn Văn Bách =

Vietnamese footballer (born 2003)

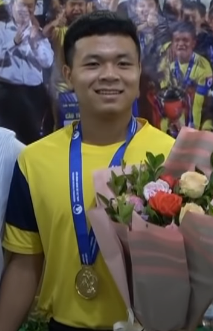
- Văn Bach in 2020

Personal information
- Full name: Nguyễn Văn Bách
- Date of birth: 2 January 2003 (age 23)
- Place of birth: Yên Thành, Nghệ An, Vietnam
- Height: 1.72 m (5 ft 8 in)
- Position: Midfielder

Team information
- Current team: Sông Lam Nghệ An
- Number: 9

Youth career
- 2013–2021: Sông Lam Nghệ An

Senior career*
Years	Team	Apps	(Gls)
2022–	Sông Lam Nghệ An	35	(1)
2022	→ Quảng Nam (loan)	10	(0)
- * Club domestic league appearances and goals as of 7 June 2026

Nguyễn Văn Bách (born 2 January 2003) is a Vietnamese professional footballer who plays as a midfielder for V.League 1 club Song Lam Nghe An.

== Club career ==
Nguyễn first developed his interest in football while in primary school; often being scolded by his parents for staying out late playing football with friends. He was spotted by Song Lam Nghe An (SLNA) scouts while playing at a youth tournament, and eventually went on to sign with the three-times Vietnamese champions.

He made his professional debut for SLNA in a 2–0 win over Hoang Anh Gia Lai.

== Career statistics ==
As of 15 October 2022.

Club	Season	League			Cup		Continental		Other		Total	
Club	Season	Division	Apps	Goals	Apps	Goals	Apps	Goals	Apps	Goals	Apps	Goals
Song Lam Nghe An	2022	V.League 1	2	0	1	0	—		—		3	0
Song Lam Nghe An	2023	V.League 1	3	0	1	0	—		—		4	0
Song Lam Nghe An	Total		5	0	2	0	0	0	0	0	7	0
Quang Nam (loan)	2022	V.League 2	10	0	0	0	—		—		10	0
Career total			15	0	2	0	0	0	0	0	17	0
