= Vũng Liêm =

Vũng Liêm Phường Vũng Liêm
- Ward
- Vũng Liêm ward
- Location within Vietnam
- Coordinates: 10°05′41″N 106°11′13″E
- Country: Vietnam
- Region: Mekong Delta
- Province: Vĩnh Long

Area
  - Total: 1.82 sq mi (4.72 km^{2})

Population (1999)
  - Total: 6,934
  - Estimate (2024): 10,000
- Time zone: UTC+7 (UTC + 7)

Vũng Liêm is a ward (phường) of Vĩnh Long Province, Vietnam.

On June 16, 2025, the Standing Committee of the National Assembly issued Resolution No. 1687/NQ-UBTVQH15 on the reorganization of commune-level administrative units in Vĩnh Long Province in 2025. Accordingly, the entire natural area and population of Vũng Liêm Township, Trung Thành Commune, and Trung Hiếu Commune were merged to form a new administrative unit named Trung Thành Commune.

On June 9, 2026, the People's Council of Vĩnh Long Province approved the renaming of Trung Thành Commune to Vũng Liêm Ward.
