= Đông Pháp Thời Báo =

Vietnamese language newspaper in Saigon

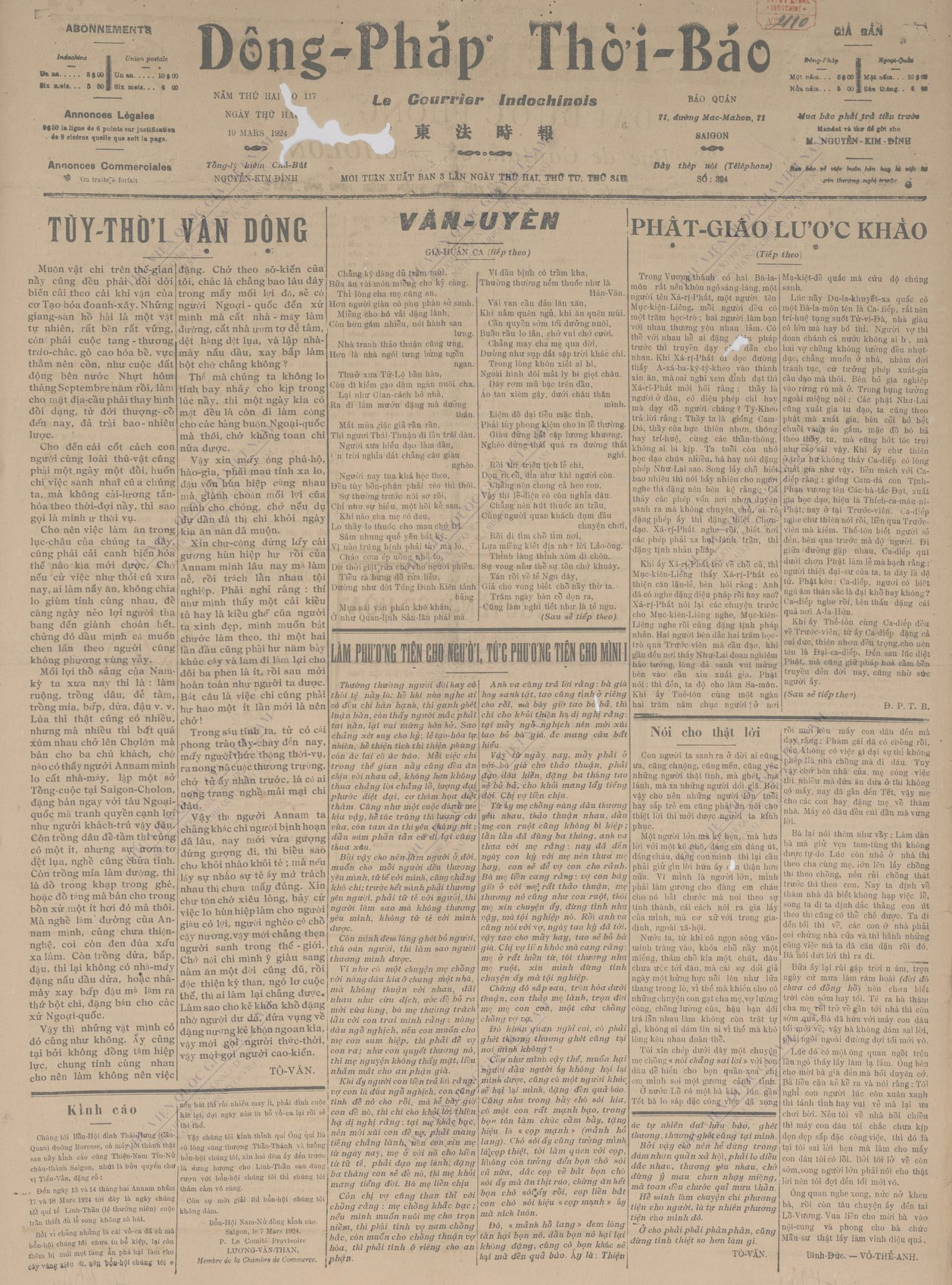
Đông Pháp thời báo, 1924

Đông Pháp Thời Báo (chữ Hán: 東法時報; Indochina Times; 2 May 1923 to 22 December 1928) was a Vietnamese language newspaper in Saigon. The founder and editor was Diệp Văn Kỳ.
