= PMU 18 scandal =

Scandal in Vietnam

The PMU 18 scandal is a multi-million dollar political corruption scandal at the Vietnamese Ministry of Transport (Bộ Giao thông Vận tải, GTVT) at the beginning of 2006, which involved embezzlement, bribery, nepotism, and gambling. The scandal received extensive press coverage in Vietnam, a rarity in the one-party state. It generated a great public outcry in Vietnam and controversy in other countries and at organizations that provided Official Development Assistance (ODA) to the country. Due to the scandal, Transport Minister Đào Đình Bình was forced to resign and his deputy was arrested. The scandal became a major issue leading up to the Tenth National Congress of the Communist Party of Vietnam, when the government leadership was being reviewed.

In the aftermath of the scandal, in 2007 the Vietnamese government clamped down on journalists reporting on the case. In 2008, two prominent journalists were tried and convicted of "abusing democratic freedoms" and propagating "false information". Two police officers involved in the case were also convicted of "disclosing work secrets".

== Background ==
Project Management Unit 18 (PMU-18) is a bureau within the Vietnamese Ministry of Transport for road construction and other infrastructure projects. As of 2006, it had a budget of 2 billion USD, which included funds from overseas donors, notably Japan, the European Union, Australia and the World Bank.

== The scandal ==
In early January 2006, Bùi Tiến Dũng, executive director of PMU-18, was detained, and it was announced that 1.8 million dollars had been embezzled to gamble on football matches. He was also accused of using the payouts to pay for prostitutes. The police found files inside the unit's computers revealing that over 200 employees at the unit had participated in the gambling. He is also under investigation over the procurement of luxury vehicles for other government officials.

Deputy Transport Minister Nguyễn Việt Tiến, a former head of PMU-18, was soon also detained and his home was searched.

The scandal affected many high-ranking officials. It was revealed that Bùi Tiến Dũng attempted to bribe officials after his arrest. People in the Prime Minister's office were investigated and the General Secretary's son-in-law was also implicated. A vice chief of police was implicated and withdrew his name from the list of delegates to the National Congress.

In early April 2006, Transport Minister Đào Đình Bình resigned, accepting responsibility for the embezzlement of millions of dollars of state money by his staff. This took place days before the opening of the Tenth National Congress of the Communist Party of Vietnam.

In March 2008, charges against Nguyễn Việt Tiến were dropped and his Communist Party membership was later reinstated.

=== Role of the press ===
The scandal is notable in that the press was initially allowed to report on the issue in great depth. Several years earlier, such topics were taboo in the Vietnamese press, as the Communist Party kept a tight grip on the media. Major newspapers openly ridiculed the officials involved and called for their resignations. Some observers attribute this to internal conflicts within the party between reformers and hardliners. Others see this as a normal occurrence before every National Congress and expect things to return to normal after the Congress ends.

In mid-2007, police questioned dozens of journalists who covered the case for the sources of certain published information.

In May 2008, two reporters were arrested for "abuse of power for personal gain" while reporting about the scandal. In addition, several senior police officers involved with the case, including the major general in charge, were indicted for revealing certain information about the case to the press. The arrests unleashed a torrent of protests from journalists and bloggers in Vietnam, leading to a highly unusual confrontation between the state-controlled press and the communist government. However, several days later, the newspapers were silent on the topic, and newspapers that continued to report it reportedly received warnings from the authorities.

In October 2008, the journalists were convicted of "abusing democratic freedoms" and propagating "false informations" and the police officers were convicted of "disclosing work secret".
