= Phan Văn Khải =

Vietnamese politician (1933–2018)

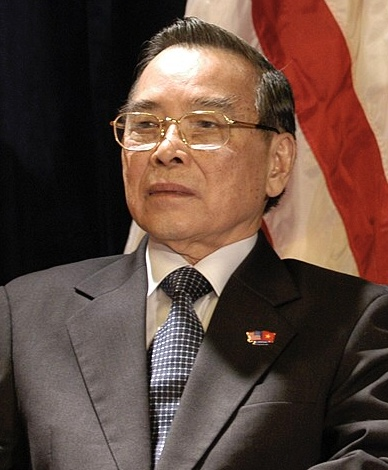
- Khải in 2005

5th Prime Minister of Vietnam
- In office 25 September 1997 – 27 June 2006
- President: Trần Đức Lương
- Deputy: Nguyễn Tấn Dũng
- Preceded by: Võ Văn Kiệt
- Succeeded by: Nguyễn Tấn Dũng

First Deputy Prime Minister
- In office 8 August 1991 – 29 September 1997
- Prime Minister: Võ Văn Kiệt
- Preceded by: Võ Văn Kiệt
- Succeeded by: Nguyễn Tấn Dũng

Personal details
- Born: 25 December 1933 Củ Chi District, Saigon (now Ho Chi Minh City), Cochinchina
- Died: 17 March 2018 (aged 84) Củ Chi District, Ho Chi Minh City, Vietnam
- Party: Communist Party of Vietnam

Phan Văn Khải (Vietnamese: [faːn˧˧ van˧˧ xaːj˧˩],alias Sáu Khải; 25 December 1933 – 17 March 2018) was a Vietnamese politician who served as the fifth Prime Minister of Vietnam from 25 September 1997 until his resignation on 27 June 2006. He was considered to be a technocratic, innovative and benevolent leader.

He was born in the countryside of Củ Chi, Ho Chi Minh City, in a family with a tradition of patriotism and fighting foreign invaders. Khải had a patriotic heart from a very early age and worked through two wars against France and the United States. Phan Văn Khải took office as prime minister on 25 September 1997. Following the path of his predecessor Võ Văn Kiệt, Khải promoted extensive international integration and led Vietnam to overcome the 1997 Asian financial crisis. He had a high level of expertise in economic management and was more open-minded than his predecessors and supported Vietnam's accession to the WTO. Due to failure to resolve the corruption situation, on 27 June 2006, Khải, together with President Trần Đức Lương and Chairman of the National Assembly Nguyễn Văn An, voluntarily submitted a resignation letter before finishing their term.

== Life and career ==
Phan Văn Khải was born on 25 December 1933 in Tan Thong Hoi commune, Củ Chi District, Saigon in French Indochina. Already during his youth he worked in revolutionary organizations. After the end of the first Indochina War and the subsequent partition of the country, Pham Van Khai took the opportunity to emigrate to North Vietnam.

Phan Văn Khải joined the revolution in 1947 and became member of the Communist Party of Vietnam on 15 July 1959.

From 1954 to 1959, he studied and worked on land reform in North Vietnam, he then studied languages, at the University of Economics in Moscow Soviet Union, until 1965.

After the war Phan Văn Khải was temporarily mayor of Ho Chi Minh City. From September 24, 1997, to June 24, 2006, he served as Prime Minister of the Socialist Republic of Vietnam. He became the first Prime Minister of Vietnam to visit United States, meeting with President George W. Bush. On June 24, 2006, he announced his resignation, along with President Trần Đức Lương.

In the period from 15 December 1998 to 5 November 2001 he also served as chairman of ASEAN.

Phan Văn Khải was considered as a moderate reformer who acted in support of the country's economic opening within the political range of Vietnam. He died on 17 March 2018 at his home in Ho Chi Minh City.

== Premiership (1997–2006) ==
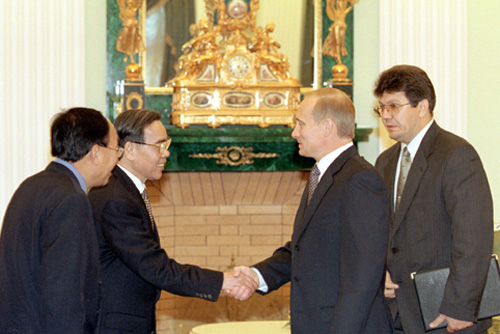
Phan Văn Khải meets Russian President Vladimir Putin

Biographers have characterized Phan Van Khai as a technocratic leader with professional training in economic management. He is the first Prime Minister of Vietnam to hold professional training in macroeconomic management. The training is credited with giving him a greater understanding of this field and of the market economy than previous and contemporary leaders had.

=== Promoting private economic development ===
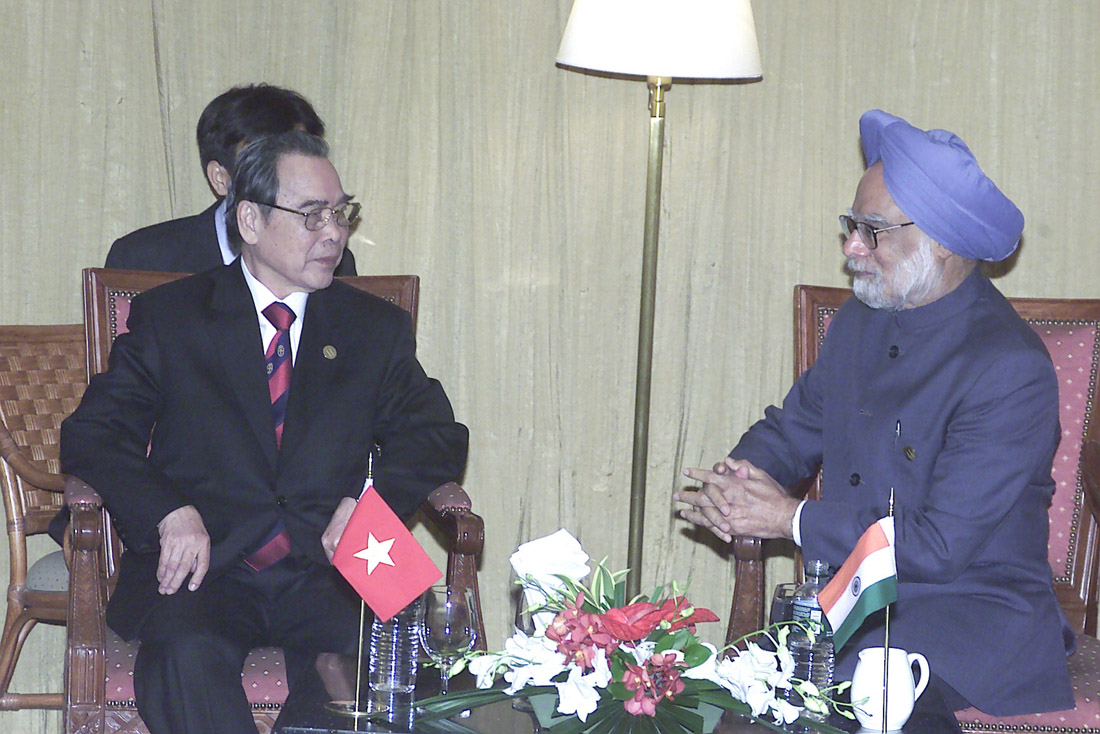
Phan Văn Khải with Indian Prime Minister Manmohan Singh in Kuala Lumpur, 12 December 2005

Before the period when he took over as prime minister, Vietnam's economy was struggling to cope with the difficulties and challenges of the times, especially the fierce ideological conflicts when the leaders in the Party were still in power. Many doubts and distinctions between state-owned enterprises and private enterprises. It is these different viewpoints that have negatively affected Vietnam's reform and opening-up process. In that context, Phan Văn Khải made great efforts to lobby the Politburo to change its view on the private economy and self-employment. He made a historic contribution by presenting the 1999 Enterprise Law to the National Assembly. The law has liberated the private economy. As head of the Government, he issued a series of important decisions, abolishing many licenses (Khải signed a decision to cancel 268/560-580 sub-licenses), and administrative procedures. cumbersome policies to create favorable conditions for the private economy to have opportunities to develop, those policies have also contributed to protecting healthy and fair competition between state-owned enterprises and private enterprise. Therefore, during his 9-year term, the private economy has had a strong rise, a series of non-state-owned companies, enterprises, and factories have gradually dominated the market and made the consumer market stronger. Domestic consumption is increasingly vibrant.

=== Leading Vietnam out of the economic crisis ===
In the early stages of Khải's term as prime minister, the regional economic situation was very unstable, the 1997 Asian financial crisis had a strong impact on the Vietnamese economy. Due to the impact of the crisis, Vietnam's economic growth was at a high level in the period 1995–1997, but in 1998 it only increased by 5.76%, in 1999 it only increased by 4.77%. Registered foreign direct investment capital in 1995 reached over US$6.9 billion, in 1996 it reached nearly US$10.2 billion, in 1997 it was nearly US$5.6 billion, in 1998 it was nearly US$5.1 billion, In 1999, it was nearly US$2.6 billion.

Inflation if in 1996 was at 4.5%, in 1997 at 3.6%, then in 1998 it was at 9.2%. If the USD price decreased by 0.6% in 1995, increased by 1.2% in 1996, then increased by 14.2% in 1997, increased by 9.6% in 1998, etc. The growth rate of export turnover in 1996 was at 33 2%, in 1997 it was 26.6%, by 1998 it was only 1.9%. If imports increased by 36.6% in 1996, then in 1997 it would only increase by 4%, in 1998 it would decrease by 0.8%, and in 1999 it would only increase by 2.1%. Because the openness of Vietnam's economy is not high at this time (exports compared to GDP have only reached 30%, the currency has not been converted), because there is already crude oil, rice, export exporting in large volumes, due to proactive response from within the country, Phan Van Khai has applied these factors very successfully. He has also issued many timely decisions to combat and control and restrained the crisis from spreading. As a result, not only was Vietnam not caught up in this storm of crisis, but in the following years, in the period 2001–2006, the economy prospered and inflation decreased. Controlled at a low level, the growth rate was high (over 8%/year) and kept stable for many years, causing the average economic growth rate of Vietnam during his time as prime minister to reach more than 7.1 per year.

=== Promoting deep integration processes ===
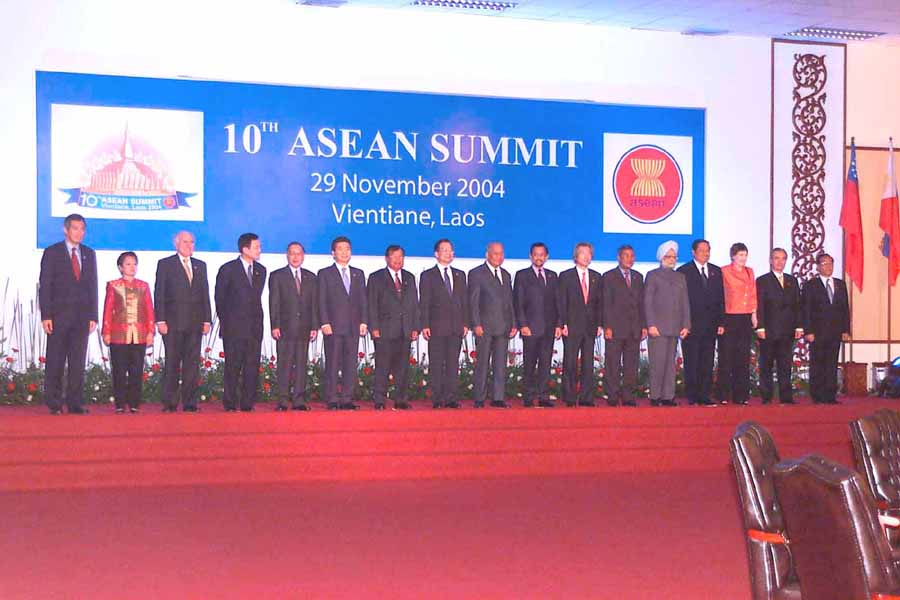
Phan Văn Khải attended the ASEAN Conference in Laos, 2004

Khải is considered a leader with a moderate and progressive ideology. He has inherited and promoted many policies and strong innovative thinking of previous Prime Minister Võ Văn Kiệt. Although Vietnam officially joined the WTO not during his time in power, during his term, it was Khải and Advisor Vo Van Kiet who were the strongest supporters of the negotiation process. negotiations to join the WTO, in fact, all the most difficult and difficult conditions and preparation procedures for this event were resolved by Khải before handing over the government. to his successor Nguyễn Tấn Dũng.

=== Official trips ===
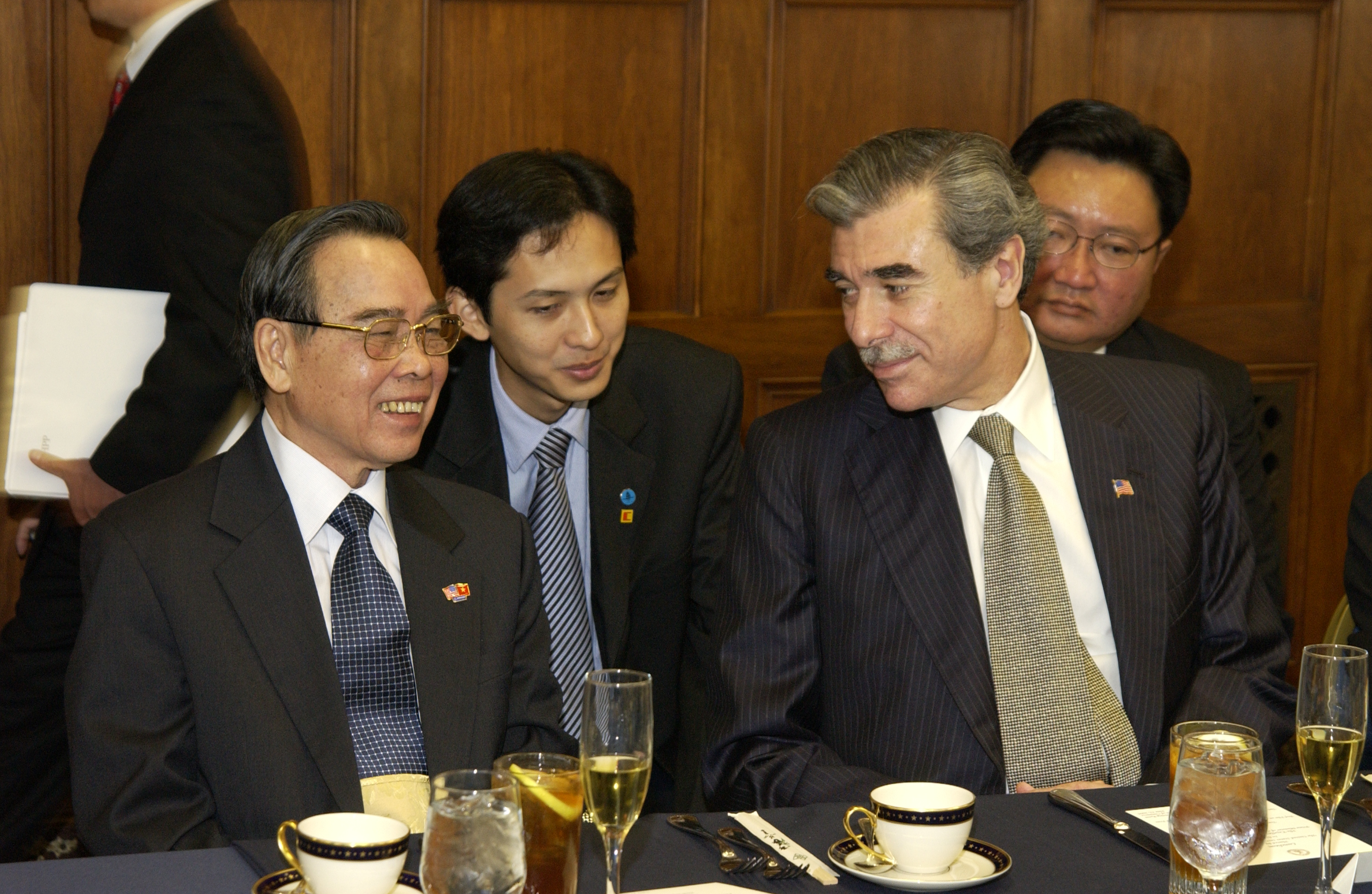
US Secretary of Commerce Carlos Gutierrez and Phan Văn Khải

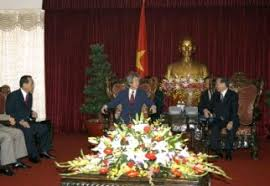
Prime minister Phan Văn Khải và Prime minister of Japan Junichirō Koizumi in 2004

In his role as Prime Minister of Vietnam, Khải has made many official visits for the first time to many countries, especially Western countries such as Canada, Sweden, England... but most notable is his trip to the United States as a leader of a unified Vietnam, the first Vietnamese Prime Minister to make a trip to the United States. historic official visit to United States from 20 June to 25 June 2005. This trip marked a new milestone in the relationship between the two countries, especially in the economic field, many large contracts were signed.

On 21 June 2005, Khải and President of United States George W. Bush had a very successful meeting. The two leaders overcame the obstacles of cultural differences, war legacy issues, as well as different approaches to some sensitive issues.

The meeting (40 minutes) lasted 15 minutes longer than expected. President Bush, with a conciliatory attitude, highly appreciated Vietnam's innovation achievements. The fact that the US leader acknowledged the progress in religion and human rights in Vietnam recently, affirmed his strong support for Vietnam's accession to the WTO, and accepted the invitation to visit Vietnam in 2006 was something 10 years ago. year no one thought of.

His trips have contributed to deepening international friendship and have also brought about many beneficial agreements for Vietnam.

=== Initiation of the Prime Minister's Advisory Committee ===
During Khải's term as prime minister, he officially established a separate advisory board for the Prime Minister and greatly trusted the organization that gathered many leading scientists in this field.

During this period, before promulgating or deciding on any important issue, he sent documents to the consulting group for consideration before and after listening to the advice, he officially made a decision. Since then, successive prime ministers after Khải have maintained the activities of this advisory group.

=== Corruption problem ===
Although he made great efforts to prevent corruption, in general during his 9-year term, Phan Van Khai was ultimately unable to control bureaucratic corruption, which increasingly worsened. The most prominent scandal during his time as prime minister was PMU Case 18, a scandal related to corruption in the Ministry of Transport Transport (GTVT) in early 2006. This case caused a stir in public opinion in Vietnam as well as countries and organizations providing official development aid (ODA ) for Vietnam, causing Minister of Transport Đào Đình Bình to be dismissed and Permanent Deputy Minister Nguyễn Việt Tiến to be imprisoned. Prime Minister Nguyễn Tấn Dũng at the inauguration ceremony said:

"I resolutely and fiercely fight corruption. If I cannot fight corruption, I will resign immediately"

His quote is also related to this incident. When Khải resigned, he also apologized to the people for allowing serious corruption to take place.

=== Resignation ===
On 16 June 2006, he decided to retire from his position one year before the end of his term, after the Party Congress, at the National Assembly session (along with Trần Đức Lương, Nguyễn Văn An). This position is replaced by Nguyễn Tấn Dũng. In his closing speech, he apologized to the people for allowing serious corruption to take place: "For serious corruption, I apologize to the people. "What I am concerned about is why some weaknesses in the socio-economic and public apparatus have been recognized for a long time, and many policies and measures have been proposed to overcome them, but the change is very slow, even Even if you're present, things will get worse."

== Personal life ==
His wife was Nguyễn Thị Sáu, former deputy director of Ho Chi Minh City's Planning and Investment Department. She died in 2012. According to the media, he has a son, Phan Minh Hoan, and a daughter, Phan Thi Bach Yen.

Phan Văn Khải died on March 17, 2018, at his home in Tân Thông Hội commune, Củ Chi district, Ho Chi Minh City. The visitation was held on March 20 and 21 at the Reunification Hall and the International Conference Center in Hanoi according to national mourning protocols. The memorial service took place on March 22, after which the casket was taken by hearse for burial, following his last wishes and his family's desires.

== Awards ==
- Japan:
  - Grand Cordon of the Order of the Rising Sun (November 2006)

Political offices
Preceded by Võ Văn Kiệt	Prime Minister of Vietnam; 1997–2006	Succeeded by Nguyễn Tấn Dũng
