= Nguyễn Văn An =

Vietnamese politician

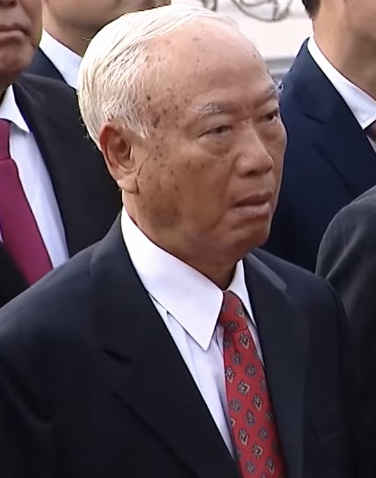
- Nguyễn Văn An in 2020

Chairman of the National Assembly of Vietnam
- In office 27 June 2001 – 26 June 2006
- Preceded by: Nông Đức Mạnh
- Succeeded by: Nguyễn Phú Trọng

Head of the Central Organization Commission
- In office 1 July 1996 – 27 June 2001
- Preceded by: Lê Phước Thọ
- Succeeded by: Trần Đình Hoan

Personal details
- Born: October 1, 1937 (age 89) Nam Định Province, Vietnam
- Party: Communist Party of Vietnam

Nguyễn Văn An (Vietnamese pronunciation: [ŋwiən˦ˀ˥ van˧˧ ʔaːn˧˧]; born 1 October 1937) is a Vietnamese politician who served as Chairman of the National Assembly of Vietnam from 2001 to 2006. Nguyễn Văn An was Appointed Chairman on 27 June 2001, An was a proponent of government and administrative reform. He was re-elected on 23 July 2002. On 24 June 2006 he resigned, citing his age and the need for a new generation of leaders to take over.

At the 5th National Congress of the Communist Party of Vietnam in March 1982 Nguyễn Văn An was elected as an alternate member of the 5th Central Committee of the Communist Party of Vietnam. At the 6th National Congress (December 1986), he was elected Member of the 6th Central Committee. At the 8th National Congress he was elected a member 8th Politburo and became the Head of the Central Organizing Commission.
