= Chairman of the National Assembly of Vietnam =

Legislative speaker of Vietnam

Chairman of the National Assembly of Socialist Republic of Vietnam
- Chủ tịch Quốc hội nước Cộng hòa xã hội chủ nghĩa Việt Nam
- Seal of the National Assembly's Chairperson

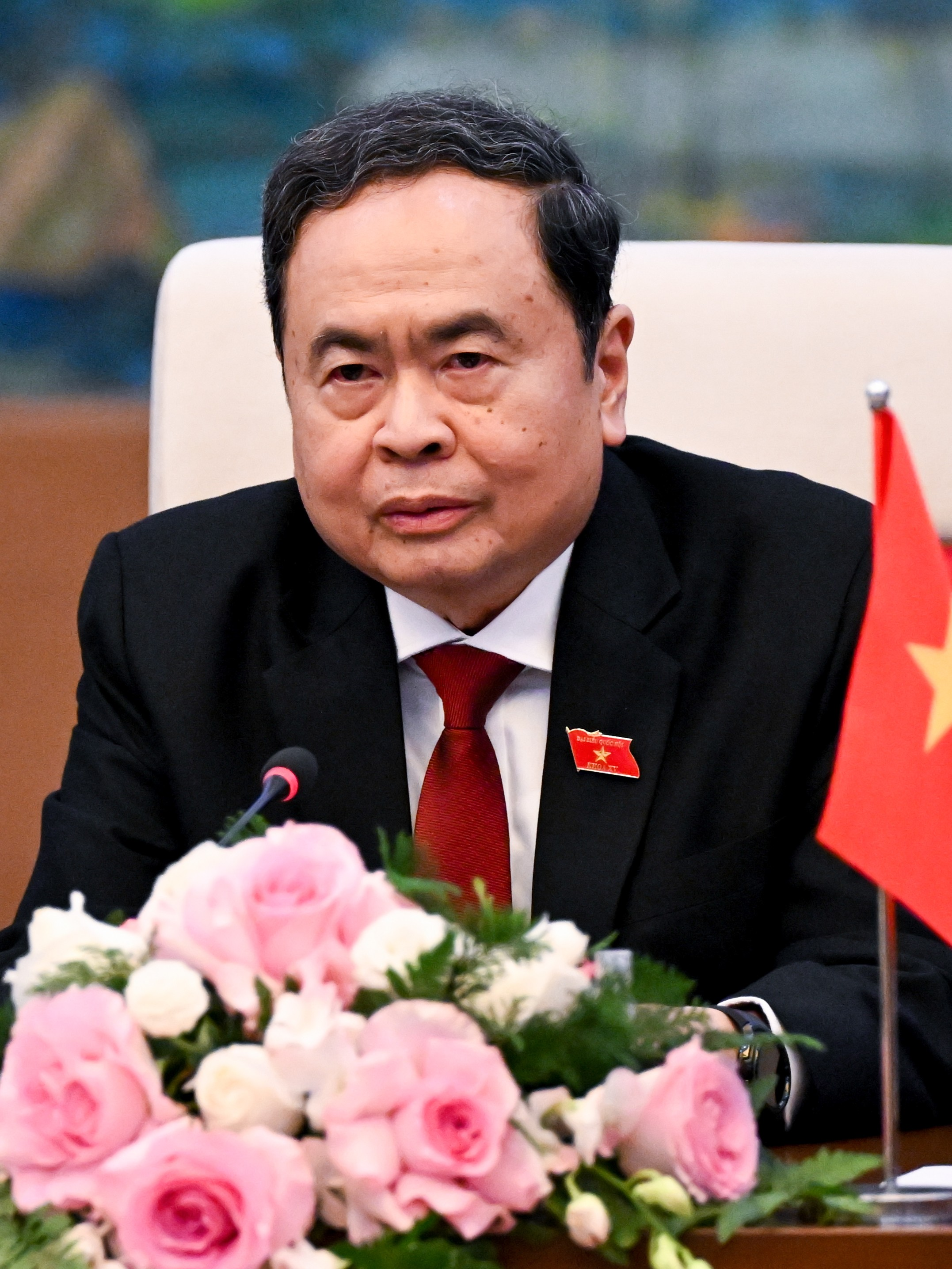
- Incumbent; Trần Thanh Mẫn since 20 May 2024
- Type: Presiding officer
- Status: Fourth highest ranking official
- Abbreviation: CTQH
- Appointer: National Assembly
- Term length: Five years, renewable
- Inaugural holder: Nguyễn Văn Tố
- Formation: 2 March 1946; 80 years ago
- Salary: 29,250,000₫ monthly

The Chairman of the National Assembly of Vietnam (Vietnamese: Chủ tịch Quốc hội Việt Nam^{[note_5]}) is the legislative speaker of the Socialist Republic of Vietnam, presiding over the National Assembly. The National Assembly is, in the words of the constitution, "the highest representative organ of the people; the highest organ of state power". This position was formerly designated as the Chairman of the Standing Committee of the National Assembly of Vietnam (Vietnamese: Chủ tịch Ủy ban Thường vụ Quốc hội Việt Nam) from 1946 to 1981.

The chairman is elected by the deputies (members) of the National Assembly in the first season of the assembly's tenure. The Standing Committee, over which the chairman presides, is a permanent body in charge of the National Assembly's activities when it is not in session. The chairman and the other members of the Standing Committee have to resign from their posts when the National Assembly dissolves itself, which it normally does every five years. The chairman presides over the sessions of the National Assembly and authenticates laws and resolutions passed by the National Assembly by signing them. The chairman leads the activities of the Standing Committee and organises its external relations with other state bodies and is responsible for maintaining cordial relations between the members of the Standing Committee. The deputies of the National Assembly have the right to question the chairman.

== History ==
The first chairman of the Standing Committee of the National Assembly was the scholar Nguyễn Văn Tố; he was not a member of the Communist Party. On 3 March 1946, under the chairmanship of Nguyễn Văn Tố, the National Assembly formed the first government of the Democratic Republic of Vietnam. Nguyễn Văn Tố was succeeded in office on 9 November 1946 by Bùi Bằng Đoàn, a poet and another non-Communist Party member. While he was never a member of the Communist Party, he was a committed revolutionary. Tôn Đức Thắng succeeded Bùi Bằng Đoàn as chairman in 1955, and was the first chairman to be a member of the Communist Party. Trường Chinh became the fourth and longest-serving chairman of the National Assembly in Vietnamese history, holding the post from 1960 to 1981, when he became chairman of the State Council, a newly established post. Nguyễn Hữu Thọ, a Southerner, succeeded Trường in 1981, as chairman, while he was not a member of the Politburo. Thọ stepped down as chairman in 1987, and was succeeded by Lê Quang Đạo, another non-Politburo member. As with Thọ, Đạo's tenure lasted one term. Nông Đức Mạnh was elected chairman in 1992, and held office until 2001. Nông was the first chairman who came from a minority background, the Tày, and was the first chairman since Trường who was a Politburo member. Nông stepped down in 2001, and was succeeded by Nguyễn Văn An, who served as chairman from 2001 until 2006. On 26 June 2006 Nguyễn Phú Trọng was elected chairman with a majority of 84.58% of the National Assembly deputies in favour. Trọng stepped down in 2011 after his election to the post of General Secretary of the Central Committee of the Communist Party of Vietnam, and was succeeded by Nguyễn Sinh Hùng. Hùng stepped down on 31 March 2016, and was replaced by Nguyễn Thị Kim Ngân. She's the first woman to hold the office. Ngân stepped down on 31 March 2021, and was replaced by Vương Đình Huệ. On 2 May 2024, Huệ was dismissed, and National Assembly Standing Vice Chairman Trần Thanh Mẫn was assigned to become the acting chairman.

== List ==
Number^{[note 2]}	Portrait	Name (Birth–Death)	Took office	Left office	Political party	National Assembly
Heads of the Standing Committee of the National Assembly of the Democratic Republic of Vietnam (1945–60)
1		Nguyễn Văn Tố (1889–1947)	2 March 1946	8 November 1946	Independent	I (1946–60)
2		Bùi Bằng Đoàn (1889–1955)	9 November 1946	13 April 1955	Independent	I (1946–60)
Acting^{[note 4]}		Tôn Đức Thắng (1888–1980)	1 August 1948	20 September 1955	Communist Party of Indochina (until 1951); Worker's Party of Vietnam (from 1951)	I (1946–60)
3		Tôn Đức Thắng (1888–1980)	20 September 1955	15 July 1960	Communist Party of Indochina (until 1951); Worker's Party of Vietnam (from 1951)	I (1946–60)
Chairman of the Standing Committee of the National Assembly of the Democratic Republic of Vietnam (1960–76)
4	A bald man, wearing a white T-shirt	Trường Chinh (1907–1988)	15 July 1960	2 July 1976	Worker's Party of Vietnam	II (1960–64)
4	A bald man, wearing a white T-shirt	Trường Chinh (1907–1988)	15 July 1960	2 July 1976	Worker's Party of Vietnam	III (1964–71)
4	A bald man, wearing a white T-shirt	Trường Chinh (1907–1988)	15 July 1960	2 July 1976	Worker's Party of Vietnam	IV (1971–75)
4	A bald man, wearing a white T-shirt	Trường Chinh (1907–1988)	15 July 1960	2 July 1976	Worker's Party of Vietnam	V (1975–76)
Chairmen of the National Assembly of the Socialist Republic of Vietnam (1976–present)
(4)	A bald man, wearing a white T-shirt	Trường Chinh (1907–1988)	2 July 1976	4 July 1981	Communist Party of Vietnam	VI (1976–81)
5		Nguyễn Hữu Thọ (1910–1996)	4 July 1981	18 June 1987	Communist Party of Vietnam	VII (1981–87)
6		Lê Quang Đạo (1921–1999)	18 June 1987	23 September 1992	Communist Party of Vietnam	VIII (1987–92)
7	a man with greying black hair, wearing a suit and tie	Nông Đức Mạnh (1940–)	23 September 1992	27 June 2001	Communist Party of Vietnam	IX (1992–97)
7	a man with greying black hair, wearing a suit and tie	Nông Đức Mạnh (1940–)	23 September 1992	27 June 2001	Communist Party of Vietnam	X (1997–2002)
8	a man with white hair, wearing a suit and tie	Nguyễn Văn An (1937–)	27 June 2001	26 June 2006	Communist Party of Vietnam	XI (2002–07)
9	a smiling man with greying black hair, wearing a suit and tie	Nguyễn Phú Trọng (1944–2024)	26 June 2006	23 July 2011	Communist Party of Vietnam	XI (2002–07)
9	a smiling man with greying black hair, wearing a suit and tie	Nguyễn Phú Trọng (1944–2024)	26 June 2006	23 July 2011	Communist Party of Vietnam	XII (2007–11)
10	a smiling nearly bald man, wearing glasses, a suit and a blue tie, back him is flag of India	Nguyễn Sinh Hùng (1946–)	23 July 2011	31 March 2016	Communist Party of Vietnam	XIII (2011–16)
11		Nguyễn Thị Kim Ngân (1954–)	31 March 2016	31 March 2021	Communist Party of Vietnam	XIII (2011–16)
11		Nguyễn Thị Kim Ngân (1954–)	31 March 2016	31 March 2021	Communist Party of Vietnam	XIV (2016–21)
12		Vương Đình Huệ (1957–)	31 March 2021	2 May 2024	Communist Party of Vietnam	XIV (2016–21)
12		Vương Đình Huệ (1957–)	31 March 2021	2 May 2024	Communist Party of Vietnam	XV (2021–26)
Acting		Trần Thanh Mẫn (1962–)	2 May 2024	20 May 2024	Communist Party of Vietnam	XV (2021–26)
Acting		Trần Thanh Mẫn (1962–)	20 May 2024	6 April 2026	Communist Party of Vietnam	XV (2021–26)
13		Trần Thanh Mẫn (1962–)	20 May 2024	6 April 2026	Communist Party of Vietnam	XV (2021–26)
13		Trần Thanh Mẫn (1962–)	6 April 2026	Incumbent	Communist Party of Vietnam	XVI (2026–31)

== Notes ==
1. The Politburo of the Central Committee is the highest decision-making body of the CPV and the Central Government. The membership composition, and the order of rank of the individual Politburo members is decided in an election within the newly formed Central Committee in the aftermath of a Party Congress. The Central Committee can overrule the Politburo.
2. These numbers are not official.
3. The Central Committee when it convenes for its first session after being elected by a National Party Congress elects the Politburo. According to David Koh, in interviews with Vietnamese officials, the Politburo ranking is based upon the number of approval votes by the Central Committee. Lê Hồng Anh, the Minister of Public Security, was ranked 2nd in the 10th Politburo because he received the second-highest number of approval votes. Another example being Tô Huy Rứa of the 10th Politburo, he was ranked lowest because he received the lowest approval vote of the 10th Central Committee when he stood for election for a seat in the Politburo. This system was implemented at the 1st plenum of the 10th Central Committee. The Politburo ranking functioned as an official order of precedence before the 10th Party Congress.
4. Ton Duc Thang took over the vacant position of Bui Bang Doan as he was ill at that time, Bui Bang Doan still held the title of Head of National Assembly until he died in 1955, hence Ton Duc Thang was acting Head of National Assembly during that period.
5. less formally the National Assembly Chairman (N.A. Chairman; Vietnamese: Chủ tịch Quốc hội, abbrev. CTQH).

== Bibliography ==
- Ferdinand Joseph Maria, Feldbrugge (1987). Vietnam Country Study Guide. Martinus Nijhoff Publishers. ISBN 978-90-247-3576-1.
- Hoang, Van Doa (2008). Viet Nam Quoc Dan Dang: A Contemporary History of a National Struggle: 1927–1954. Dorrance Publishing. ISBN 978-1-4349-9136-2.
- International Business Publications, USA (2012). Vietnam Country Study Guide. International Business Publications. ISBN 978-0-7397-1584-0.
- Koh, David (July–August 2008). "Leadership Changes at the 10th Congress of the Vietnamese Communist Party". Asian Survey. 48 (4). University of California Press: 650–672. doi:10.1525/as.2008.48.4.650. JSTOR 3738744.
- Singh, Daljit; Thambipillai, Pushpa (2012). Southeast Asian Affairs 2012. Institute of Southeast Asian Studies. ISBN 978-981-4380-23-2.
- Van, Canh Nguyen; Cooper, Earle (1983). Vietnam under Communism, 1975–1982. Hoover Press. ISBN 978-0-8179-7851-8.
