= Nông Đức Mạnh =

Vietnamese politician

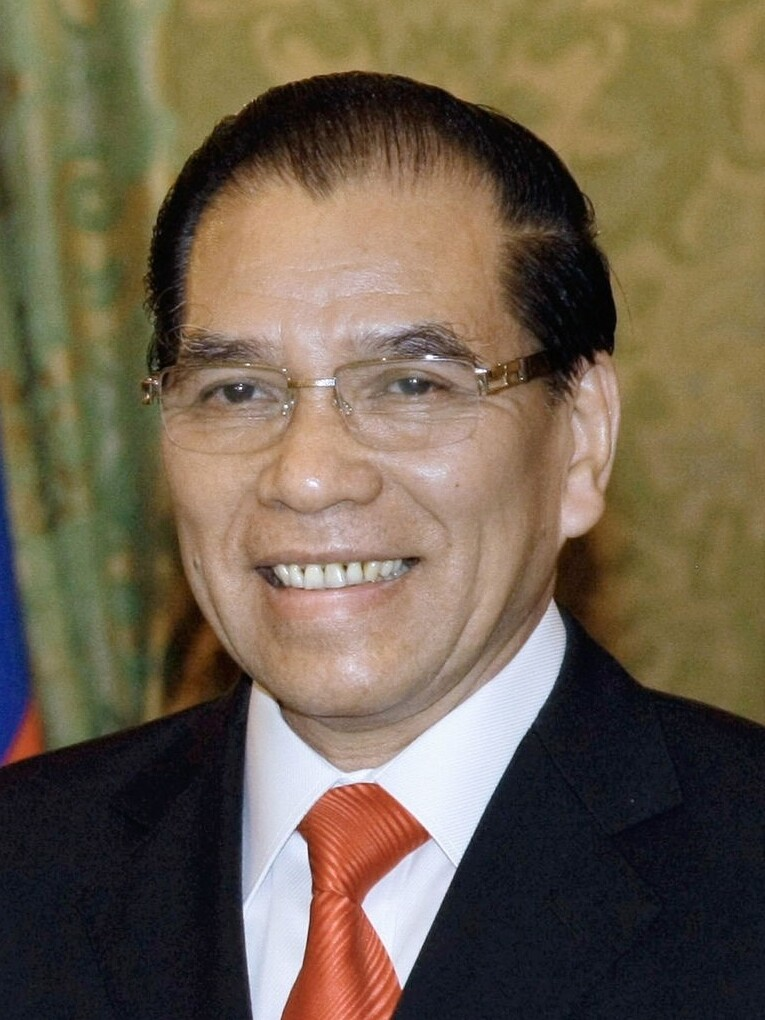
- Mạnh in 2010

General Secretary of the Communist Party of Vietnam Secretary of the Central Military Commission
- In office 22 April 2001 – 19 January 2011
- Preceded by: Lê Khả Phiêu
- Succeeded by: Nguyễn Phú Trọng

Chairman of the National Assembly of Vietnam
- In office 23 September 1992 – 27 June 2001
- Preceded by: Lê Quang Đạo
- Succeeded by: Nguyễn Văn An

Personal details
- Born: 11 September 1940 (age 86) Na Rì, Bắc Kạn Province, Tonkin, French Indochina
- Party: Communist Party of Vietnam
- Spouses: Lý Thị Bang (m. 1962; died 2010); Đỗ Thị Huyền Tâm (m. 2012)
- Education: Leningrad Forestry Institute; Ho Chi Minh National Academy of Politics

Nông Đức Mạnh (Vietnamese: [nəwŋm ɗɨ́k mâjŋ̟ˀ]; born 11 September 1940) is a Vietnamese former politician who served as General Secretary of the Communist Party of Vietnam from 2001 to 2011, and as Chairman of the National Assembly from 1992 to 2001. A member of the Tày ethnic minority, he trained as a forestry engineer in the Soviet Union and rose through the party in Bắc Thái province.

Mạnh was the first leader of the party from an ethnic minority and the first with a university degree. He was regarded as a consensus builder from the party's ideological centre, and he was credited with turning the National Assembly into a more active legislature. As general secretary, he moved to curb corruption and to integrate Vietnam further into the global economy, and he was re-elected in 2006. He retired at the party's 11th Congress in January 2011 and was succeeded by Nguyễn Phú Trọng. He has long been rumoured to be a son of Hồ Chí Minh, a claim that he has denied.

== Early life and education ==
Nông Đức Mạnh was born on 11 September 1940 in Cường Lợi commune, in Na Rì district of Bắc Kạn province, into a peasant family of the Tày ethnic minority. He joined the revolutionary movement in 1958, and from 1958 to 1961 he studied at the Central Agriculture and Forestry School in Hanoi. From 1962 to 1963, he worked as a forestry worker and forest survey technician for the Bắc Kạn forestry service.

Mạnh joined the Communist Party on 5 July 1963 and became a full member in July 1964. From 1963 to 1965, he was deputy leader of a timber-harvesting team in Bạch Thông. He then studied Russian at the Hanoi Foreign Languages School from 1965 to 1966, and from 1966 to 1971 he studied at the Leningrad Forestry Institute in the Soviet Union.

== Provincial career ==
After his return to Vietnam, Mạnh became deputy head of inspection at the forestry service of Bắc Thái province in 1972, and from 1973 to 1974 he was director of the Phú Lương forestry enterprise. From 1974 to 1976, he studied at the Nguyễn Ái Quốc Higher Party School. From 1976 to 1980, he was a member of the Bắc Thái provincial party committee and served first as deputy head and then as head of the provincial forestry service.

In 1980, Mạnh became deputy chairman of the Bắc Thái provincial people's committee. In 1984, he was appointed deputy secretary of the provincial party committee and chairman of the people's committee, and from November 1986 to February 1989 he was secretary of the provincial party committee. At the 6th National Congress in December 1986, he was elected an alternate member of the Central Committee, and he became a full member at its sixth plenum in March 1989.

== National Assembly ==
In August 1989, Mạnh became head of the party's Central Commission for Ethnic Affairs. In November of that year, he was elected to the National Assembly and became deputy chairman of its Council of Nationalities. He was elected to the Politburo at the 7th National Congress in 1991. In September 1992, the National Assembly elected him as its chairman, and he was re-elected to the post by the new legislature in 1997.

As chairman, Mạnh travelled to China, the ASEAN countries and the United States. He was credited with reforming the National Assembly so that it ceased to be a rubber-stamp body. According to The Japan Times, the assembly became a working legislature under his leadership, with lively debate and greater public accountability. At the 8th National Congress in 1996, he declined to stand for general secretary, and he was re-elected to the Politburo, where he ranked fourth of 19 members. In 1997, he became a standing member of the Politburo.

== General Secretary ==
=== Selection ===
Ahead of the 9th National Congress in April 2001, the Politburo voted by 12 to 6 to recommend that General Secretary Lê Khả Phiêu be reappointed, but the Central Committee overturned the recommendation. Phiêu was accused of weak leadership and of misusing military intelligence to wiretap other leaders. On 17 April 2001, before the congress opened, party delegates chose between Mạnh and Nguyễn Văn An, and after intense lobbying Mạnh was selected by acclamation. He was named general secretary on 22 April 2001, and he gave up the chairmanship of the National Assembly to Nguyễn Văn An.

Mạnh was the first leader of the party from an ethnic minority and the first with a university degree. The Associated Press described him as a moderate who relied on consensus, and the political scientist Carlyle Thayer saw him as a consensus maker who represented the ideological centre of the party. The congress also replaced the standing board of the Politburo with a Secretariat and abolished the posts of party advisers, which had allowed retired leaders to keep their influence.

=== Domestic policy ===
On taking office, Mạnh pledged to continue Vietnam's opening to the world and to take tougher measures against corruption. He set the goal of making Vietnam an industrialised country by 2020. In June 2001, the Politburo issued a directive requiring officials to declare their assets. Mạnh also endorsed the costly Sơn La hydroelectric project, which required the resettlement of about 100,000 people, most of them from ethnic minorities.

In February 2001, thousands of members of ethnic minorities had protested in the Central Highlands. In September, Mạnh visited the three affected provinces and ordered measures on education, the recruitment of minority officials and support for coffee growers. He also oversaw amendments to the 1992 constitution, which the National Assembly approved in December 2001. According to Thayer, the Central Committee met in plenary session more often than the party statute required during his first years in office, which suggested an activist agenda. Thayer also noted that the post of general secretary had become less powerful than in the era of Lê Duẩn.

=== Foreign relations ===
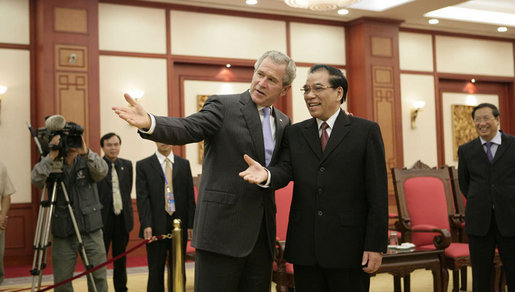
Nông Đức Mạnh with US President George W. Bush

From 30 November to 4 December 2001, Mạnh made his first visit to China as general secretary, and he held talks with Jiang Zemin in Beijing. He reaffirmed Vietnam's support for the One China policy, and the two leaders attended the signing of an agreement on economic and technical cooperation and of a Chinese preferential loan to Vietnam. In March 2004, he visited Cuba, where he met Cuban leader Fidel Castro.

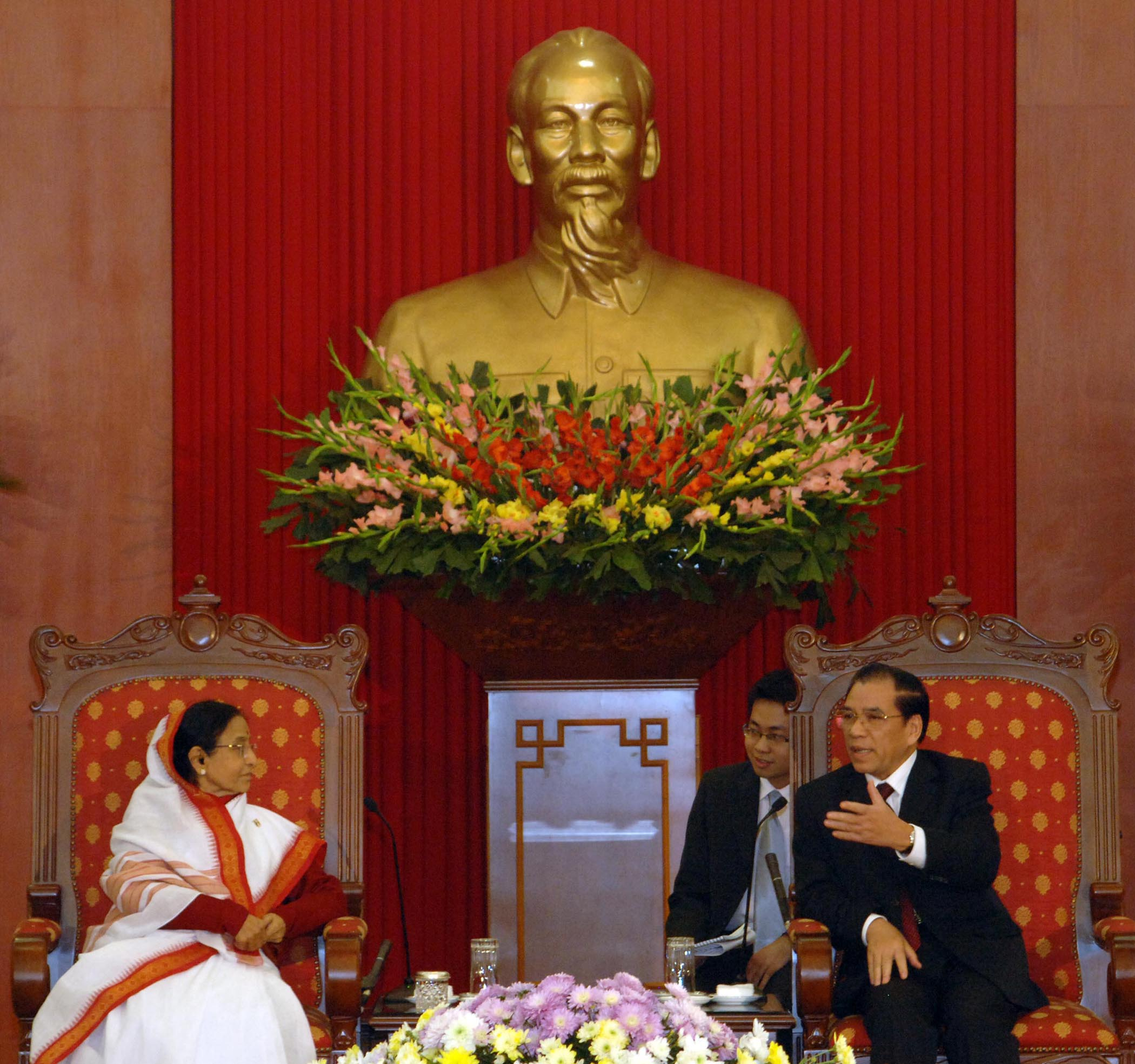
Nông Đức Mạnh meeting President of India Pratibha Patil (2008)

In November 2006, Mạnh received US President George W. Bush, who was in Hanoi for the APEC summit and who congratulated Vietnam on its admission to the World Trade Organization. In May and June 2007, he led a delegation to Chile, Brazil, Venezuela and Cuba. In April 2009, he made an official visit to Japan, where he and Prime Minister Tarō Asō agreed to strengthen the strategic partnership between the two countries and to begin annual reciprocal visits.

=== Second term and retirement ===
On 25 April 2006, the 10th National Congress re-elected Mạnh for a second five-year term. The congress was held during a corruption scandal at the transport ministry, and it amended the party charter to allow members to take part in private business for the first time.

Nông Đức Mạnh with Russian President Dmitry Medvedev (2010)

At the opening of the 11th National Congress in January 2011, Mạnh praised Vietnam's economic development, but he warned that its growth might not be sustainable and that the party had failed to curb corruption. He also said that hostile forces were using democracy and human rights to try to overthrow the party, and he called for the restructuring of the economy so that Vietnam would become an industrialised nation by 2020. On 19 January 2011, the Central Committee elected Nguyễn Phú Trọng as his successor. In his speech at the closing session, Mạnh congratulated the new leadership, and Trọng credited the country's recent achievements in part to Mạnh's leadership. Mạnh remained a deputy in the National Assembly until May 2011, having served in its 8th to 12th legislatures.

== Later life ==
On 20 January 2025, General Secretary Tô Lâm presented him with the Gold Star Order, Vietnam's highest decoration, for his contributions to the party and the nation. On 2 May 2026, Japan awarded him the Grand Cordon of the Order of the Rising Sun for his contributions to relations between the two countries. Japanese Prime Minister Sanae Takaichi presented the decoration to him in Hanoi on 2 May 2026.

== Personal life ==
Mạnh's first wife Lý Thị Bang died on 24 October 2010 at the age of 69, in Lương Hạ commune of Na Rì district, and she was buried in the family's home cemetery on 26 October. Their son Nông Quốc Tuấn was then secretary of the party committee of Bắc Giang province, and he had earlier led the Ho Chi Minh Communist Youth Union. By 2013, Tuấn was a deputy minister and vice chairman of the Committee for Ethnic Minorities.

Mạnh later married Đỗ Thị Huyền Tâm, the chairwoman and chief executive of the Minh Tâm Group and a former deputy in the National Assembly.

== Paternity rumours ==
Mạnh has long been rumoured to be an illegitimate son of Hồ Chí Minh. His rumoured mother, Nông Thị Trưng, was a Tày woman from a village near Pác Bó in Cao Bằng province. Hồ returned to Vietnam from China in February 1941 and set up his headquarters at Pác Bó. According to a party journal, he taught Trưng to read and write, and she joined the party in December 1941 with Hồ as one of her sponsors. In 1944, he gave her a copy of his translation of The Art of War, with a short poem on the cover urging her to study. She later served as chief judge of the Cao Bằng provincial people's court from 1964 to 1980.

The official Encyclopedia of Vietnam gives Mạnh's date of birth as 11 September 1940 and states that he was born to a Tày peasant family. This was before Hồ's return from China. However, a profile of Mạnh in the education ministry's magazine Thế Giới Mới, published soon after he became general secretary, identified Nông Thị Trưng as his mother in a footnote.

At a news conference after his election in April 2001, Mạnh was asked about the rumour, and he replied that his parents had died when he was very young and that all Vietnamese were the children of Uncle Hồ. In a January 2002 interview with Time, he denied that he was Hồ's son and named his parents as Nông Văn Lại and Hoàng Thị Nhị.

== Awards and honors ==
- Vietnam:
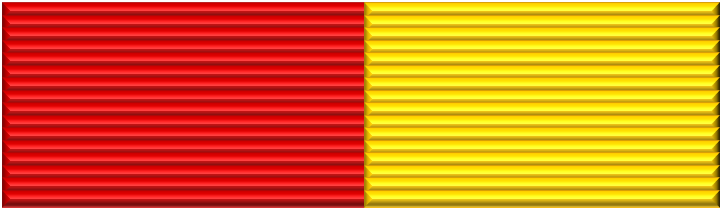
  - Gold Star Order (20 January 2025)
- Cuba:
  - Order of José Martí (6 March 2004)
- Japan:
  - Grand Cordon of the Order of the Rising Sun (3 November 2025)
- Russia:
  - Order of Friendship (7 February 2000)
  - Medal of Pushkin (28 February 2008)

Party political offices
| Preceded by Lê Khả Phiêu | General Secretary of the Communist Party of Vietnam; 2001–2011 | Succeeded by Nguyễn Phú Trọng |
Political offices
| Preceded by Lê Quang Đạo | Chairman of the National Assembly of Vietnam; 1992–2001 | Succeeded by Nguyễn Văn An |
