= Lê Dư =

Vietnamese scholar

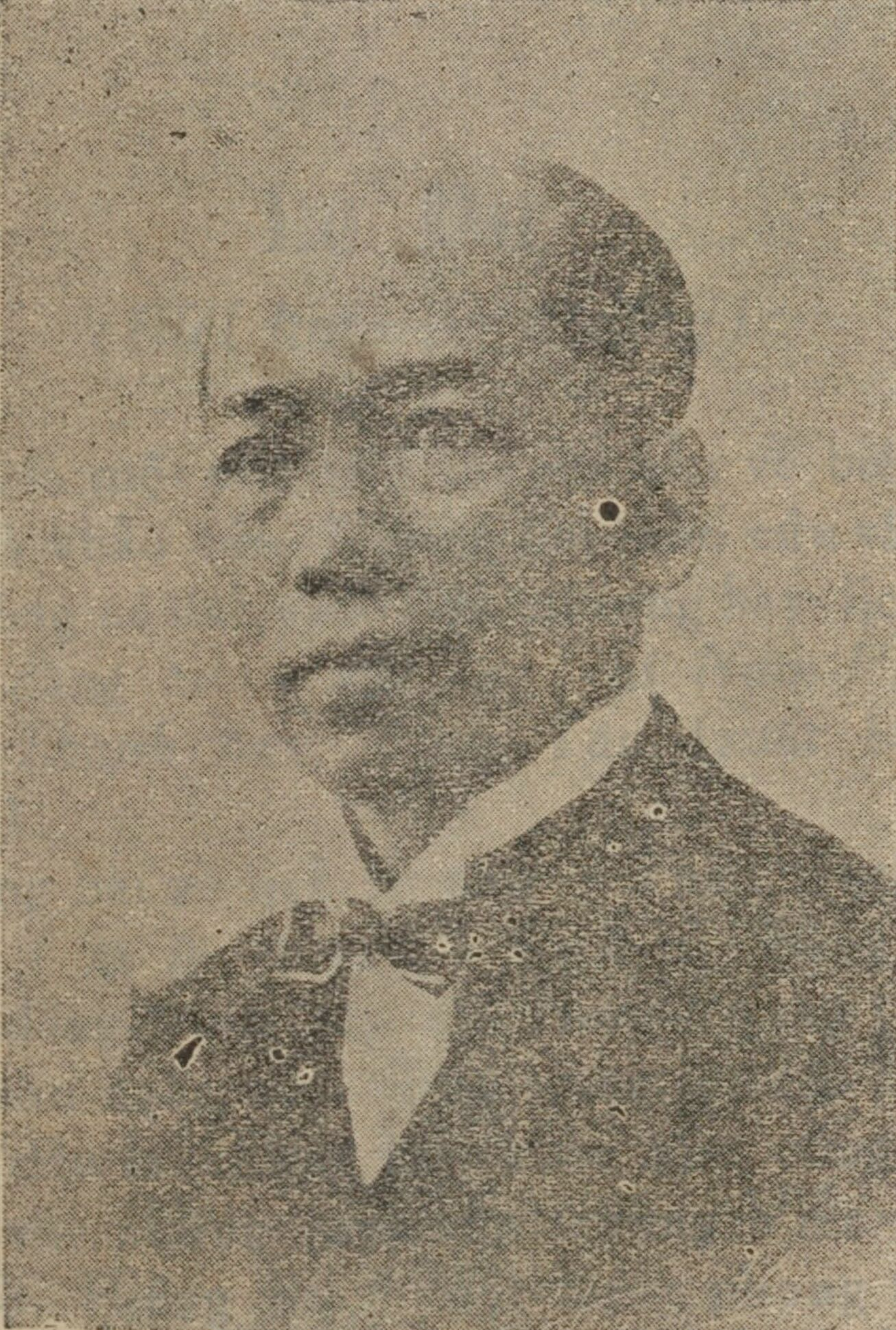
Lê Dư

Sở Cuồng or Lê Dư (born 1884, xã Nông Sơn, Điện Bàn District - died 31 August 1967) was a Vietnamese scholar.

He was born in Quảng Nam. Although his exact birth date was not known, he lived in the same period with Phan Khôi, the leader of the Nhân Văn affair. He had obtained part of his study in Empire of Japan, following Phan Bội Châu.

It seems that around 1900 he with two his friends headed to Hanoi to learn French, later he joined Đông Kinh school and the movement of Đông Du. In 1925 after having travelled to Japan and Korea he returned to Vietnam and worked in the Political Department of North governor, later he worked in the Far-east School of antique in Hanoi. His work consisted of editing books and cooperation with mass media of that time.

He married the sister of Phan Khôi.

He had four daughters; the youngest one drowned at an early age, the other three married prominent scholars of Vietnam. Lê Hằng Phương, a poet herself, married Vũ Ngọc Phan. Lê Hằng Phấn married Hoàng Văn Chí. Lê Hằng Huân married general Nguyễn Sơn. Sở Cuồng Lê Dư initiated the collection of "Quốc Học Tùng Thư" or "Books about Vietnamese Heritage".

== Published works ==
- Dấu tích Thăng Long
