= Nguyễn Sơn =

Vietnamese military leader (1908-1956)

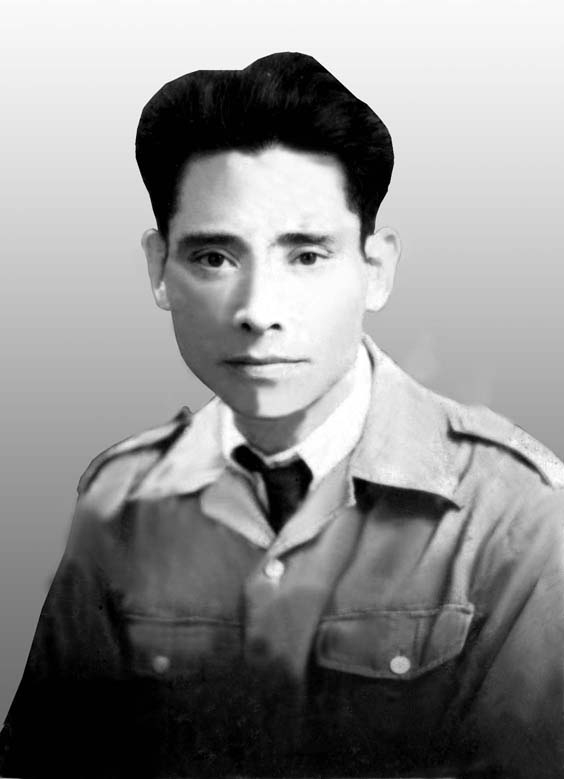

6th Dean of the Trần Quốc Tuấn Military Academy
- In office December 1946 – September 1947
- Preceded by: Hoàng Đạo Thúy
- Succeeded by: Hoàng Đạo Thúy

3rd [[Director of the Military Training Bureau Ministry of Defense (Note: Now under the General Staff.)]]
- In office 30 January 1947 – 1948
- Minister: Võ Nguyên Giáp (1947); Tạ Quang Bửu (1947 - 1948); Võ Nguyên Giáp (1948)
- Preceded by: Hoàng Văn Thái
- Succeeded by: Hoàng Đạo Thúy

1st Commander of Inter-Region 4
- In office 1947–1949
- Preceded by: Post established Lê Thiết Hùng (as Commander of War Zone 4)
- Succeeded by: Hoàng Minh Thảo

Personal details
- Born: Vũ Nguyên Bác; 1 October 1908 Kiêu Kỵ village, Gia Lâm district, Bắc Ninh province, French Indochina
- Died: 21 October 1956 (aged 48) Hanoi, North Vietnam
- Awards: August 1 Medal (First Class); Order of Independence and Freedom (First Class); Order of Liberation (First Class)

Military service
- Allegiance: Chinese Communist Party; North Vietnam
- Branch/service: (China) People's Liberation Army (North Vietnam) Vietnam People's Army
- Years of service: 1927–1956
- Rank: Major General (China); Major General (North Vietnam)
- Battles/wars: Chinese Civil War; Guangzhou Uprising; Long March; French Indochina War
- Other military offices held: 1947–1948: Political Commissar, Inter-Region 4

Nguyễn Sơn (1 October 1908 – 21 October 1956), also known by his Chinese name Hong Shui (Chinese: 洪水), was a Vietnamese military leader who participated in the Chinese Communist Revolution and the First Indochina War against the French. Sơn spent much of his early years in China, and was one of the few Vietnamese who had participated in and survived the Long March with the Chinese Communist Party. He was awarded the rank of Major General in both the Vietnam People's Army and the People's Liberation Army, and thereafter was referred to as "the General of Two Countries".

He married Lê Hằng Huân, a daughter of the writer Lê Dư, his sisters-in-law being Lê Hằng Phương, wife of the writer Vũ Ngọc Phan, and Lê Hằng Phấn, wife of the writer Hoàng Văn Chí.

== Early life ==
Nguyễn Sơn was born on 1 October 1908 in Gia Lâm District in Hanoi as Vũ Nguyên Bác. He was the son of Vũ Trường Xương. When he was five years old he began to learn French at a Catholic school in Hanoi. When Sơn was fourteen years old he passed the Hanoi Teachers College. He often organizes students from the School of Education and the Guardian School to fight against Westerners in other schools. His parents married him to Nguyễn Thị Giệm four years older than him. He pretended to drink alcohol to causing trouble with his father-in-law and to get rid of his older wife.

Sơn was sent to study in France, where he met Hồ Chí Minh. At the end of 1924, Sơn, Hoàng Văn Hoan, Phạm Văn Đồng and more than 30 Vietnamese revolutionary youths followed Hồ to Guangzhou. In March 1926, Sơn was introduced by Li Fuchun, Cai Chang, Lin Biao, Liu Zhidan and others at the Whampoa Military Academy. At the academy, he was introduced to Chen Yimin and joined the Chinese Communist Party (CCP). After graduating in October 1926, Sơn followed Hồ Chí Minh's instructions and continued to work at the Whampoa Military Academy, and joined the Kuomintang.

== Revolutionary career ==
On 12 April 1927, Chiang Kai-shek carried out a purge of thousands of suspected Communists and dissidents in Shanghai, and began large-scale massacres across the country collectively known as the "White Terror". In response, Sơn left the Kuomintang and officially joined the CCP in August 1927. In December 1927, he participated in the Guangzhou Uprising, and after its failure fled to Hong Kong. With the consent of Ye Jianying and Nie Rongzhen, Sơn and Ho Chi Minh went to Thailand in order to organize overseas Vietnamese to join the revolution.

In 1928, he returned to China and joined the People's Liberation Army. In 1929, he held the position of company political commissar in the 47th Regiment, and commanded the company in battles near Dong River. During this time, he adopted the name Hong Shui.

He was the only foreign officer in the People's Liberation Army. He served as the regimental commissar, and political director of the 34th Division of the Chinese Red Army's 12th Army. Due to his rich practical experience and theoretical background, he was assigned to teach at the newly established Central Military Political School of the Red Army in Ruijin, Jiangxi Province. At the end of 1932, he also participated in the establishment of the first troupe of the Red Army, and later became leader of the troupe.

In January 1934, at the Second National Congress of Delegates of the Chinese Soviet Republic, Sơn was elected a member of the Central Committee of the CCP and as an ethnic minority representative. Because the leftist line prevailed in the CCP, during the period 1933 to 1938, he was expelled from the CCP three times, only to have his membership restored.

In October 1934, he participated in the Long March, a military retreat undertaken by the Red Army to evade the pursuit of the Kuomintang army. During this time, he was falsely accused by Zhang Guotao of being a spy and was expelled from the CCP. He was sentenced to be executed, but was saved due to intervention from Zhu De and Liu Bocheng. The march traversed over 9,000 kilometres (5,600 mi) over 370 days from Jiangxi to Shaanxi Province and Sơn was the only Vietnamese to have successfully completed the march.

In December 1935, he returned to Yan'an after being lost for many days. He was later admitted to Chinese Red Army University, where in listened to the lectures by Mao Zedong and Zhou Enlai.

In July 1937, at the beginning of the Second Sino-Japanese War, he followed Commander-in-Chief of PLA Zhu De and the 115th Division across the Yellow River to Shanxi Province to establish an anti-Japanese base at the Wutai Mountains. He was appointed Party Secretary of Dongye District and Head of the Propaganda Department of the Northeast Shanxi Party Committee.

After being one of the only foreign officers in the People's Liberation Army, he returned to Tonkin to fight against the French Colonial forces in 1945. He would return to China in 1950. His final return to Hanoi would be in 1956 shortly before his death from lung cancer.
