= Shooting at the 2003 SEA Games =

Shooting events at the 2003 SEA Games

- Venue: Hanoi Shooting Range
- Location: Hanoi, Vietnam
- Dates: December 2003

Shooting at the 2003 Southeast Asian Games was held in December 2003 at the Hanoi Shooting Range in Hanoi, Vietnam. The competition featured pistol, rifle, running target, and shotgun events for men and women, including individual and team events.

== Events ==
A total of 41 sets of medals were contested.

=== Men's events ===
==== Pistol ====
- 25 m Rapid Fire Pistol (2 × 30)
- 25 m Standard Pistol (3 × 20)
- 25 m Center Fire Pistol (30 + 30)
- 50 m Free Pistol (60 shots)
- 10 m Air Pistol (60 shots)

==== Rifle ====
- 50 m Free Rifle Prone (60 shots)
- 50 m Rifle Three Positions (3 × 40)
- 10 m Air Rifle (60 shots)

==== Running target ====
- 10 m Running Target (30 + 30)
- 10 m Running Target Mixed

==== Shotgun ====
- Skeet Individual
- Trap Individual
- Double Trap Individual

==== Team events ====
- 25 m Rapid Fire Pistol Team
- 25 m Standard Pistol Team
- 25 m Center Fire Pistol Team
- 50 m Free Pistol Team
- 10 m Air Pistol Team
- 50 m Free Rifle Prone Team
- 50 m Rifle Three Positions Team
- 10 m Air Rifle Team
- 10 m Running Target Team
- 10 m Running Target Mixed Team
- Trap Team

=== Women's events ===
==== Pistol ====
- 25 m Sport Pistol (30 + 30)
- 10 m Air Pistol (40 shots)

==== Rifle ====
- 10 m Air Rifle (40 shots)
- 50 m Free Rifle Prone (60 shots)
- 50 m Rifle Three Positions (3 × 20)

==== Running target ====
- 10 m Running Target (20 + 20)
- 10 m Running Target Mixed

==== Shotgun ====
- Skeet Individual
- Trap Individual
- Double Trap Individual

==== Team events ====
- 25 m Sport Pistol Team
- 10 m Air Pistol Team
- 10 m Air Rifle Team
- 50 m Free Rifle Prone Team
- 50 m Rifle Three Positions Team
- 10 m Running Target Team
- 10 m Running Target Mixed Team
- Trap Team

== Medal summary ==
=== Medal table ===
Shooting at the 2003 SEA Games – Medal table
Rank	Country	Gold	Silver	Bronze	Total
1	Vietnam	25	12	6	43
2	Thailand	11	15	10	36
3	Malaysia	3	3	4	10
4	Myanmar	1	3	5	9
5	Singapore	1	3	3	7
6	Philippines	1	1	3	5
7	Indonesia	0	5	5	10
8	Cambodia	0	0	5	5
9	Laos	0	0	1	1
Total		42	42	42	126

== Medalists ==
=== Men's events ===
Event	Gold	Silver	Bronze
25 m Rapid Fire Pistol (2 × 30)	Pham Cao Son (VIE)	Opas Ruengpanyawut (THA)	Padilla Nathaniel (PHI)
25 m Standard Pistol (3 × 20)	Jakkrit Panichpatikum (THA)	Nguyen Manh Tuong (VIE)	Nguyen Trung Hieu (VIE)
25 m Center Fire Pistol (30 + 30)	Nguyen Manh Tuong (VIE)	Jakkrit Panichpatikum (THA)	Opas Ruengpanyawut (THA)
50 m Free Pistol (60 shots)	Jakkrit Panichpatikum (THA)	Nguyen Manh Tuong (VIE)	Maung Kyu (MYA)
10 m Air Pistol (60 shots)	Kyu Maung (MYA)	Hoang Xuan Vinh (VIE)	Jakkrit Panichpatikum (THA)
50 m Free Rifle Prone (60 shots)	Nguyen Tan Nam (VIE)	Komkrit Kongnamchok (THA)	Aung Nyein Ni (MYA)
50 m Rifle Three Positions (3 × 40)	Varavut Majchacheeap (THA)	Tavarit Majcharcheep (THA)	Pham Chi Kien (VIE)
10 m Air Rifle (60 shots)	Tavarit Majcharcheep (THA)	Ong Jun Hong (SGP)	Nopdao Rueanprang (THA)
Men 10 m Running Target (30 + 30)	Dang Ngoc Phuc (VIE)	Tran Hoang Vu (VIE)	Masruri (INA)
Men 10 m Running Target Mixed	Tran Hoang Vu (VIE)	Yoshie Agusta Akbar (INA)	Dang Ngoc Phuc (VIE)
Men Skeet Individual	Teh Chee Fei (MAS)	Rosario Paul Brian (PHI)	Cheong Yew Kwan (MAS)
Men Trap Individual	Le Nghia (VIE)	Lee Wung Yew (SGP)	Recio Jaime (PHI)
Men Double Trap Individual	Lee Wung Yew (SGP)	Puai Khamgasem (THA)	Doan Xuan Tho (VIE)
Men 25 m Rapid Fire Pistol (Team)	Pham Cao Son (VIE); Nguyen Trung Hieu (VIE); Trinh Quoc Viet (VIE)	Opas Ruengpanyawut (THA); Sumeth Arayavongkul (THA); Jakkrit Panichpatikum (THA)	Sok Sarom (CAM); Phalla Phareth (CAM); Hem Setha (CAM)
Men 25 m Standard Pistol (Team)	Nguyen Manh Tuong (VIE); Nguyen Trung Hieu (VIE); Pham Cao Son (VIE)	Jakkrit Panichpatikum (THA); Opas Ruengpanyawut (THA); Peera Piromratna (THA)	Khamsung Aseung (LAO); Sisane Saya (LAO); Phimmasone Bounliang (LAO)
Men 25 m Center Fire Pistol (Team)	Nguyen Manh Tuong (VIE); Nguyen Trung Hieu (VIE); Pham Cao Son (VIE)	Jakkrit Panichpatikum (THA); Opas Ruengpanyawut (THA); Virath Chotitawan (THA)	Sok Sarom (CAM); Phalla Phareth (CAM); Hem Setha (CAM)
Men 50 m Free Pistol (60 shots) Team	Nguyen Manh Tuong (VIE); Tran Quoc Cuong (VIE); Pham Cao Son (VIE)	Than Sein (MYA); Maung Kyu (MYA); Myint Aung (MYA)	Jakkrit Panichpatikum (THA); Nopparat Kulthon (THA); Opas Ruengpanyawut (THA)
Men 10 m Air Pistol (60 shots) Team	Hoang Xuan Vinh (VIE); Tran Quoc Cuong (VIE); Nguyen Manh Tuong (VIE)	Than Sein (MYA); Kyu Maung (MYA); Win Hlaing (MYA)	Jakkrit Panichpatikum (THA); Saran Wongkhiaosiri (THA); Opas Ruengpanyawut (THA)
Men 50 m Free Rifle Prone (60 shots) Team	Komkrit Kongnamchok (THA); Tavarit Majcharcheep (THA); Varavut Majchacheeap (THA)	Nguyen Tan Nam (VIE); Vu Thanh Hung (VIE); Pham Chi Kien (VIE)	Aung Nyein Ni (MYA); Khin Maung Htoo (MYA); Kyaw Moe Win (MYA)
Men 50 m Rifle Three Positions (3 × 40) Team	Varavut Majchacheeap (THA); Tavarit Majcharcheep (THA); Nutchawawong Kuntawong (THA)	Pham Chi Kien (VIE); Nguyen Tan Nam (VIE); Phung Le Huyen (VIE)	Mohd Hameleay bin Abdul Mutalib (MAS); Mohd Emran bin Xakaria (MAS); Ahmad a/l Anai (MAS)
Men 10 m Air Rifle (60 shots) Team	Tavarit Majcharcheep (THA); Varavut Majchacheeap (THA); Nopdao Rueanprang (THA)	Ahmad a/l Anai (MAS); Mohd Hameleay bin Abdul Mutalib (MAS); Azlan bin Johari (MAS)	Ong Jun Hong (SGP); Tham Shengde Samuel (SGP); Zhang Jin (SGP)
Men 10 m Running Target (30 + 30) Team	Dang Ngoc Phuc (VIE); Tran Hoang Vu (VIE); Nguyen Van Tung (VIE)	Yoshie Agusta Akbar (INA); Masruri (INA); Gunawan (INA)	Saramon Jareangchit (THA); Mongkonchai Meechu (THA); Kittisak Wattanadej (THA)
Men 10 m Running Target Mixed Team	Tran Hoang Vu (VIE); Dang Ngoc Phuc (VIE); Nguyen Anh Tuan (VIE)	Yoshie Agusta Akbar (INA); Gunawan (INA); Masruri (INA)	Kittisak Wattanadej (THA); Saramon Jareangchit (THA); Jitti Kaenthongland (THA)
Men Trap Team	Recio Jaime (PHI); Ang Eric (PHI); Dionisio Jethro (PHI)	Le Nghia (VIE); Doan Xuan Tho (VIE); Duong Anh Trung (VIE)	Bernard Yeoh Cheng Han (MAS); Chen Seong Fook (MAS); Leong Wei Heng (MAS)

=== Women's events ===
Event	Gold	Silver	Bronze
Women 25 m Sport Pistol (30 + 30)	Pham Thi Ha (VIE)	Nguyen Thu Van (VIE)	Sareera Yangphaiboon (THA)
Women 10 m Air Pistol (40 shots)	Le Thi Linh Chi (VIE)	Sareera Yangphaiboon (THA)	Nguyen Thu Van (VIE)
Women 10 m Air Rifle (40 shots)	Sununtha Kuntapong (THA)	Dam Thi Nga (VIE)	Nur Suryani binti Mohamed Taibi (MAS)
Women 50 m Free Rifle Prone (60 shots)	Nguyen Thi Hoa (VIE)	Nur Suryani binti Mohamed Taibi (MAS)	Win Cho San (MYA)
Women 50 m Rifle Three Positions (3 × 20)	Nurul Hudda binti Baharin (MAS)	Dang Thi Hang (VIE)	Naticha Siththipong (THA)
Women 10 m Running Target (20 + 20)	Dang Hong Ha (VIE)	Cu Thanh Tu (VIE)	Herce Meiske Tumbuan (INA)
Women 10 m Running Target Mixed	Cu Thanh Tu (VIE)	Dang Hong Ha (VIE)	Puji Lestari (INA)
Women Skeet Individual	Sutiya Jiewchaloemmit (THA)	Sirinara Hasunaha (THA)	Ng Swee Theng (SGP)
Women Trap Individual	Hoang Thi Tuat (VIE)	Supawan Karjaejuntasak (THA)	Corral Gay Josefina (PHI)
Women Double Trap Individual	Supornpan Chewcalermmit (THA)	Janejira Srisongkram (THA)	Sarmunah (INA)
Women 25 m Sport Pistol (30 + 30) Team	Pham Thi Ha (VIE); Nguyen Thu Van (VIE); Bui Thi Thuy Hanh (VIE)	Sareera Yangphaiboon (THA); Tanyaporn Prucksakorn (THA); Piyada Pupiroamchaikul (THA)	Chhim Boray (CAM); Suon Sarath (CAM); Tep Saran (CAM)
Women 10 m Air Pistol (40 shots) Team	Le Thi Linh Chi (VIE); Nguyen Thu Van (VIE); Bui Thi Thuy Hanh (VIE)	Nyo Mi Kyaw (MYA); Khin Soe Theik (MYA); Ni Tar (MYA)	Sareera Yangphaiboon (THA); Tanyaporn Prucksakorn (THA); Wanwarin Yusawat (THA)
Women 10 m Air Rifle (40 shots) Team	Sununtha Kuntapong (THA); Kusuma Tavisri (THA); Naticha Siththipong (THA)	Nurul Hudda binti Baharin (MAS); Nur Suryani binti Mohamed Taibi (MAS); Noriha binti Rani (MAS)	Dam Thi Nga (VIE); Nguyen Thi Hang (VIE); Nguyen Thi Thanh Nhan (VIE)
Women 50 m Free Rifle Prone (60 shots) Team	Nguyen Thi Hoa (VIE); Dang Thi Hang (VIE); Nguyen Thi Thanh Nhan (VIE)	Naticha Siththipong (THA); Kuneekorn Tophaiboon (THA); Pojjanee Pongsinwijit (THA)	Lim Chea Rong (SGP); Aishah bte Samad (SGP); Sarina bte Abidin (SGP)
Women 50 m Rifle Three Positions (3 × 20) Team	Nurul Hudda binti Baharin (MAS); Nur Suryani binti Mohamed Taibi (MAS); Nor Dalilah binti Abu Bakar (MAS)	Naticha Siththipong (THA); Kuneekorn Tophaiboon (THA); Pojjanee Pongsinwijit (THA)	Win Cho San (MYA); Than Than Saw (MYA); Khin Pa Pa Tun (MYA)
Women 10 m Running Target (20 + 20) Team	Dang Hong Ha (VIE); Cu Thanh Tu (VIE); Tran Thanh Phuong (VIE)	Herce Meiske Tumbuan (INA); Puji Lestari (INA); Hasmawarni (INA)	Suon Sarath (CAM); Chhim Boray (CAM); Tep Saran (CAM)
Women 10 m Running Target Mixed Team	Cu Thanh Tu (VIE); Dang Hong Ha (VIE); Nguyen Thi Le Quyen (VIE)	Puji Lestari (INA); Herce Meiske Tumbuan (INA); Hasmawarni (INA)	Chhim Boray (CAM); Suon Sarath (CAM); Tep Saran (CAM)
Women Trap Team	Hoang Thi Tuat (VIE); Dang Thi Thu Trang (VIE); Nguyen Thi Tuyet Mai (VIE)	Tan Shi-lin Charlotte (SIN); Aihni bte Samad (SIN); Tan Poh Tian (SIN)	Sylvia Silimang (INA); Supadmi (INA); Sarmunah (INA)
