= Lê Hằng Phấn =

Lê Hằng Phấn (died c.1990 in Bowie, Maryland) was the second daughter of a Vietnamese scholar Sở Cuồng Lê Dư.

She was one among the four sisters: Lê Hằng Phương - Lê Hằng Phấn - Lê Hằng Huân - Lê Hằng Trang. The four sisters were referred to as The beautiful fairies from Quảng Nam.

Lê Hằng Phương was an acclaimed poet, published the "Hương Xuân" selection of poems together with Vân Đài and Mộng Tuyết in 1943. Hương Xuân was the first set of poems published by Vietnamese women. Lê Hằng Phương married Vũ Ngọc Phan, an acclaimed Vietnamese scholar. Lê Hằng Huân married Nguyễn Sơn, a well-respected Vietnamese general during the First Indochina War against the French colonialism.

In 1940, Lê Hằng Phấn married Hoàng Văn Chí, a prominent Vietnamese scholar. In 1954, Lê Hằng Phấn and Mr. Hoàng left the Communist North Vietnam to go South. In 1959, Lê Hằng Phấn started travel the world with Mr. Hoàng, to India, France, and the United States, where they settled in Bowie, Maryland.

From 1962 to 1964, while Hoang Van Chi concentrated on writing and translating From Colonialism to Communism, Mrs. Hoàng worked to support the family. Together with Mr. Hoàng, Mrs. Hoàng always entertained his circle of friends and introduced their international friends to her special Vietnamese food and drinks. She also taught the young students who came to their home in Bowie how to prepare traditional Vietnamese food. In 1975, with waves of boat people leaving Vietnam, Mrs. Hoàng actively participated in many fund-raising activities by selling her special “springrolls” by mail order nationwide. In 1979, together with Mr. Hoàng, Lê Hằng Phấn founded the Vietnam Food and Drink Company in Bowie, Maryland.

After Mr. Hoàng died in 1988, Mrs. Hoàng continued his work to ensure the book Humanism or Duy Van Su Quan was published in 1990. She died shortly after this work was accomplished.
