= Thụy An =

Vietnamese poet (1916–1989 )

Lưu Thị Yến (pen names Thụy An and Thụy An Hoàng Dân; 1916-1989) was a Vietnamese poet.

== Life ==
Lưu Thị Yến was born in 1916 in Hà Nội. She was the daughter of Lưu Tiến Ích and Phùng Thị Tôn. In 1929, at age 13, her poem got published in Nam Phong. She was one of the writers associated with the Nhân Văn-Giai Phẩm movement. Along with Nguyễn Hữu Đang she was one of the five most active participants in the movement and was imprisoned from 1958-1974.

== Works ==
=== Newspapers ===
- Đàn Bà Mới, Saigon, 1934
- Đàn Bà, Ha Noi, 1937
- Phụ Nữ Tân Văn, Saigon, 1939

=== Publications ===
- Một linh hồn, 1943 A Soul, a romantic novel
- Bốn mớ tóc - 4 tresses of hair, published by Thế Giới, Hà Nội (July 1950), 100p, include 3 stories: Một thương; Bà mẹ, Cô con và Mớ tóc (reprinted in Khởi Hành magazine, issue 185, March 2012)
- Chiếc cầu chân chó, A four-legged (bamboo) bridge
- Tôi về quên mất cả xuân sang - Poem, Dec. 3, 1951, I forgot Spring time when I left, dedicated to Trinh Tiên
- Les vingt cinq meilleures histoires du monde - published by Pen International in 1954 or 1955.
- Giết chó - (condemn the practice of slaughtering dogs) First published in Phổ Thông magazine by Ha Noi Law School Alumni Association (Hội Cựu Sinh Viên Trường Luật Hà Hội), double issue 19-20 (June–July 1953, p. 109). Reprinted in Khởi Hành magazine, issue 77 (March 2003), United States.
- Movie review, Nhân xem phim "Anh gắng nuôi con", đặt lại vấn đề "Tân hiện thực", tiểu luận phê bình điện ảnh - first published in Văn Nghệ, issue 142, pp 4–5, 9 (Oct 11, 1956).
- Chuyện bố, mẹ, bé và con búp bê. Trăm Hoa Children book: Daddy, Mommy, baby and a doll (Nov. 25, 1956)
- Chiếc lược - Strategy, Poem, published by Trăm Hoa (Dec. 2, 1956)
- Thụy An, mẹ chúng tôi, Our mother - 1988
- Nhật ký trong tù Prison Diary
- Người lãnh tụ, A leader
- Phiên chợ trời, Farmers Market
- Bùi thị Xuân
- Vợ chàng Trương, Truong's wife
- Sao lại mùa thu How is Autumn? - Poem
- Chiếc lược - Poem, first published in Trăm Hoa, November 4, 1956.
- Thụy An: Đất nước và phụ nữ Việt Nam Country and Vietnamese women- August 19, 1987, Gia Định
