= Travail =

Travail may refer to:

- Travail (band), an American Christian nu-metal band, and the title of its 1999 album
- Travail (film), a 2002 Japanese film
- Travail, a 1901 novel by Émile Zola
- Labour/Le Travail, a Canadian academic journal, published since 1976
- Le Travail-Le Droit du Peuple, two French language newspapers in Switzerland, published from 1917 to 1940
- Le Travail Movement, an anti-colonialism movement in Vietnam from September 1936 to April 1937
