= Phan Khôi =

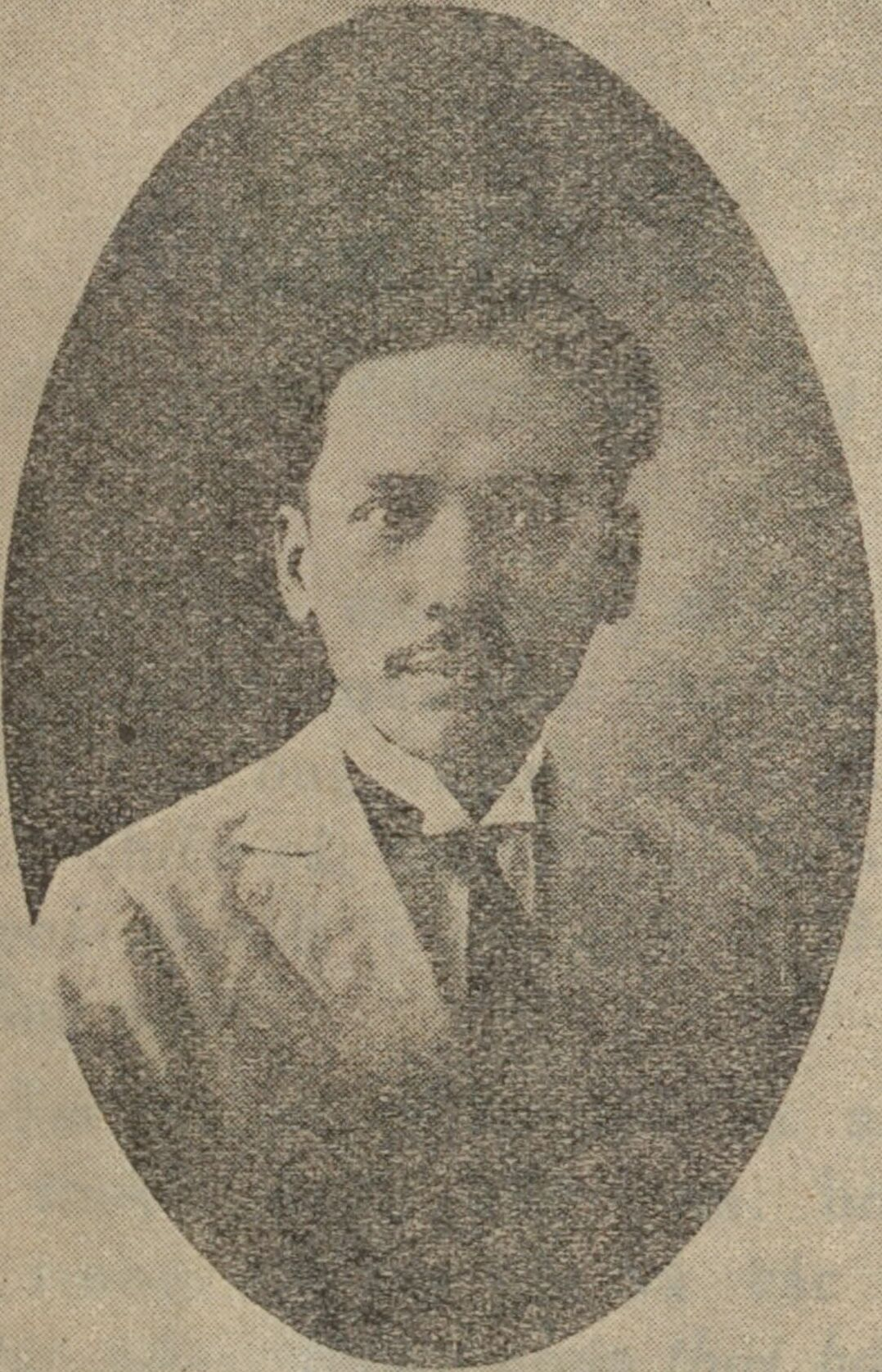
- Khôi in c. 1942-1945
- Born: 6 October 1887; Quảng Nam
- Died: 16 January 1959 (aged 71); Hà Nội
- Parents: Phan Trân (father); Hoàng Thị Lệ (mother)

Phan Khôi (October 06, 1887 – January 16, 1959) was an intellectual leader who inspired a North Vietnamese variety of the Chinese Hundred Flowers Campaign, in which scholars were permitted to criticize the government, but for which he himself was ultimately persecuted by the Worker's Party of Vietnam.

== Biography ==
=== Early life and education ===
Phan Khôi was born in an elite Confucian family in Bảo An village, Điện Bàn county, Quảng Nam Province. His father was Phó bảng (Second-rank, under Doctorate) Phan Trân, a son of Nam Định Judge Phan Khắc Nhu. His mother was Hoàng Thị Lệ, a daughter of Hà Ninh Governor-general Hoàng Diệu. Phan Khôi learned Chinese characters from a young age and was very well read. He read many progressive writings and developed a belief in civil rights and a new society.

In 1906, he joined the Progressive Movement (Duy Tân) led by Phan Châu Trinh (1872–1926), Huỳnh Thúc Kháng (1876–1947) and Trần Quý Cáp (1870–1906). Phan Khôi moved to Hanoi to learn French and Quốc ngữ (Vietnamese written in the Latin alphabets).

In 1907, he joined the "Đông Kinh Nghĩa Thục" school, founded by Phan Châu Trinh with the help of Phan Bội Châu in teaching materials. Then in 1908 the French cracked down on Progressive Movement, they captured all members, executed the leaders and imprisoned others. Phan Khôi was sent back to prison in Điện Bàn. In 1909, being pardoned by the French, he went to Huê and studied at the Pellerin School (1909–11).

=== Opening school and teaching ===
In 1912, his grandmother died, Phan Khôi came home for the funeral and stayed at his village, opened his own school and started teaching. 1913, Phan Khôi married the daughter of Lương Thúc Ký (1873–1947). Lương Thúc Ký was a teacher at Dục Anh school at Phan Thiêt. Dục Anh school was founded by Mr. Nguyễn Trọng Lợi, who also was a member of the Progressive Movement.

=== Journalism ===
Phan Khôi wrote under the pen name Chương Dân, and was very well known for his new, revolutionary and controversial ideas.

He contributed to Đăng Cổ Tùng Báo (1907) of Đông Kinh Nghĩa Thục, Nam Phong (1918) founded by Phạm Quỳnh, Lục Tỉnh Tân Văn, Hà Nội Thực Nghiệp Dân Báo (1920), Hữu Thanh (1921), Đông Pháp Thời Báo (1923), Trung Lập Báo (1924), Thần Chung (1929)

=== Editorships ===
Phan Khoi was the editor of Phụ Nữ Tân Văn (1929), Phụ Nữ Thời Đàm (1932), Tràng An (1934).

=== The Nhân Văn Affair ===
In 1956, Phan Khôi led the Nhân Văn - Giai Phẩm movement in Hanoi, and he served as editor in chief as well as the publisher of the Nhân Văn (1956). He also contributed to the Giai Phẩm periodical and Văn, a weekly publication. Some leading Vietnamese intellectuals in the north of the country, like Nguyễn Hữu Đang and Trần Đức Thảo (1917–1993), joined Phan Khoi to express their ideals in the Nhân Văn - Giai Phẩm Movement, demanding freedom of speech, freedom of the press, and democracy. They accused the Communist Party of violating the Constitution of the Democratic Republic of Vietnam.

In December 1956, the Communist Party forced the papers to close. By 1958, after indecision about what to do about the participants in this dissent, it had arrested numerous participants in the Nhan Van Giai Pham affair, imprisoned some of them, forced some into public self-criticism, and put others on trial. This was reported to the world in the translated book The Nhân Văn Affair by Hoàng Văn Chí.

Since this event till the last day of his life, Phan Khôi was kept prisoner at home, his ideas and writings were suppressed. Phan Khôi died suddenly January 16, 1959 at home in Hanoi.

== Published works ==
- 1936 - Chương Dân thi thoại [Poems of Chương Dân]
- 1939 - Trở vỏ lửa ra
- 1955 - Việt ngữ nghiên cứu [Studies about Vietnamese language]
- 1932 - Tình già [Old Love - Poem written in new format]
- 1918 - Bàn về tế giao [Remarks about diplomacy]
- Ngẫu cảm (thơ chữ Hán) [Inspiration - poem written in Chinese characters]
- Viếng mộ ông Lê Chất [Visiting the grave of Lê Chất - poem in Chinese characters]
- Ông Năm chuột (truyện ngắn) [Mr. Năm Chuột - short story]
- Phan Khôi - Poems
- Phan Khôi: Thánh hiền ta đời xưa chưa hề có tư tưởng dân chủ
- Phan Khôi: Việt ngữ nghiên cứu
- Phan Khôi: văn học với nữ tánh
- Phan Khôi: cấm sách, sách cấm
- Phan Khôi: Tư tưởng Tây phương và Đông phương
- Phan Khôi: Học thuyết cũ với vận mạng mới nước Tàu
- Phan Khôi: Mấy lời kết luận về Cô Hồng Minh và cái thuyết Âu châu sắp tan nát
- Phan Khôi:Thanh niên với tổ quốc
- Phan Khôi: Chữ quốc ngữ ở Nam kỳ với thế lực của phụ nữ
- Phan Khôi: Cách mạng giả
- Phan Khôi: Khoa học với văn hóa
- Phan Khôi: Cái ảnh hưởng của Khổng giáo ở nước ta
- Phan Khôi: Chữ trinh, cái tiết với cái nết
- Phan Khôi: Về cái ý kiến lập hội "Chấn hưng quốc học" của ông Phạm Quỳnh
- Phan Khôi: Về chữ Quốc ngữ
- Phan Khôi: Cách ngôn luận của người Á Đông
- Phan Khôi: Người mở đầu cho luận lý học Á Đông
- Phan Khôi: Trên lịch sử nước ta không có chế độ phong kiến - Lại Nguyên Ân sưu tầm, hiệu đính, giới thiệu

== Legacy ==
Phan Khôi represented a Vietnamese elite class in the transitional time from Chinese education to the new era of Western values. Phan Khôi had made the transition very swiftly not only by himself, but he also took his generation along with him. Being exposed to different cultures from China, Hong Kong, Japan, France, he was able to combine them all to serve his Vietnamese people.

Phan Khôi brought many new ideas to Vietnam, from a new democratic society with respect to human rights and civil rights, to equality for women, to a new trend of poetry. He provided the best spirit to a debate in Bàn thêm về "bút chiến", which until today is still the foremost valuable lesson the Vietnamese ought to learn.

The Nhân Văn Affair continued to be an inspiration for the Vietnamese intellectuals today.

In his writing, Đàn bà với quốc sự, Phan Khôi clearly offered Vietnamese ladies a place of honor in society within the setting of Vietnamese culture.

His poem "Old Love" was the first poem written in a new format, opening doors for many young poets to surpass him in a short time.

However, he also was very interested in researching the roots of Vietnamese heritage, especially Vietnamese spoken language, which had long been ignored and looked down upon by the elite class in Vietnam. His research Phan Khôi: Việt ngữ nghiên cứu was a well of knowledge for young Vietnamese to follow.

One generation before Hoàng Văn Chí, one generation after Phan Châu Trinh, Phan Khôi represented a class of Vietnamese intellectuals caught between colonialism, nationalism, communism. Phan Khôi's progressive spirit and his lifelong effort to raise the Vietnamese people's awareness of human rights, civil rights, and good education were suppressed by the Communist Party with The Nhân Văn Affair since 1956 are being revived in the 2000s by the younger generation of Vietnam.
