= Đào Sĩ Chu =

Vietnamese painter

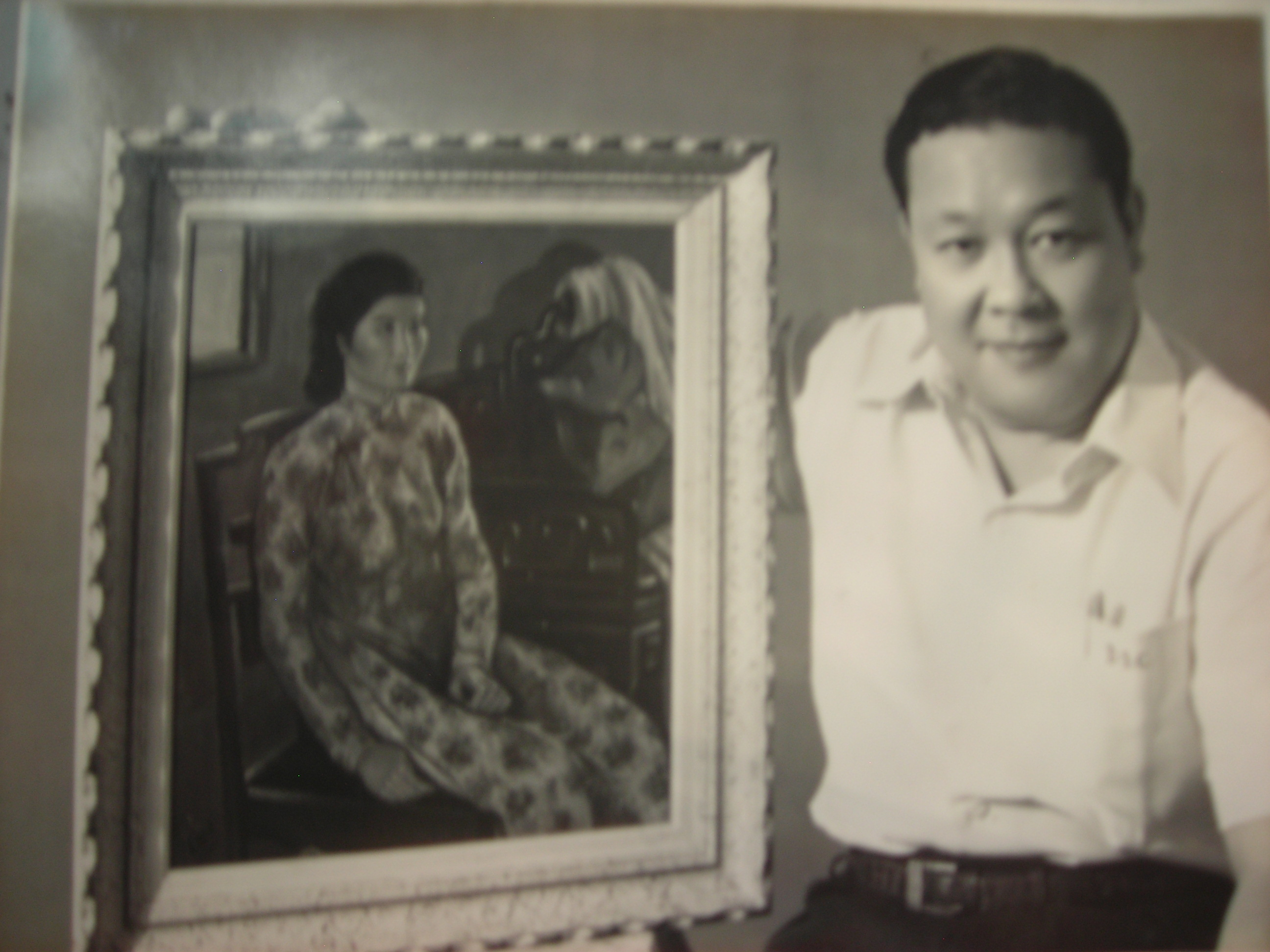
Đào Sĩ Chu, 1952 in Hà Nội

Đào Sĩ Chu (1909-1974) was a Vietnamese painter who studied in France and was known for following the traditional style of the EBAI school. He was also an organizer of art exhibitions and writer on the history of art.

== Early life, education and influences ==
Đào Sĩ Chu was born on September 20, 1909 (Kỷ Dậu), Hà Nội, Việt Nam, from an intellectual family. His father Đào Huống Mai was an industrialist and one of his sisters was the renowned pre-war poet Vân Đài, Đào Thị Nguyệt Minh.

Finishing his secondary classes in Lycée Albert-Sarraut, his family sent him to study pharmacy at the University of Toulouse, France and at that time, painting was only his hobby. After graduating as a 1st grade Pharmacist (pharmacien de 1ère classe) in 1939, he had initial contacts with well-known artist painters of Hanoi such as Trần Bình Lộc, Lê Phổ, and Tô Ngọc Vân who were graduates of l'École des beaux arts de l'Indochine (EBAI) for first painting techniques and therefore, he was influenced by the EBAI school.

== Career ==
During his travels in 1949–1951 and visiting many Fine Arts Museums in France, he devoted himself to fine arts and determined to study painting in a private workshop. His first exhibition with Lê Bá Đảng was at Vibaud Galerie and his paintings received appreciative comments from the art magazines Les Ponts des Arts and Le Cri de Paris for his color composition and portrait skills. Heartened by his initial success, his other paintings were exhibited consecutively at Grand Palais and Salon des Artistes Indépendants in Paris where he was a member of the Société des Artistes Indépendants.

Back in Viêt Nam, he set up his private and permanent exhibition room Liên Hương in Hà Nội for his colleagues paintings and often participated in other exhibitions organised in the Opera House of Hà Nội.

Awarded the Golden Medal at the Saigon Exhibition in 1955, he was appointed to be the Chairman of the National Cultural Conference(1957) for promoting the next cultural movements and events as the annual Spring Painting Award (1959) and then, the First International Exhibition of Fine Arts of Sàigòn (October 1962) of which he was Delegate and Secretary General.

In an interview, he said "Art should be a creation. Although, there are many tendencies in Realism and Impressionism, I believe that the future will belong to Cubism, non-figurative and abstracts arts, however I prefer realism-impressionism oil painting".

His typical oil painting of Thủ Đức landscape was printed on March page in the Calendar 1959 of the United States of Information Service (USIS).

From the years 1960 to 1970, he was Professor of the École supérieure des Beaux Arts de Gia Định. He served as Professor and Fine Arts Advisor of Minh Đức Catholic University until his death in Saigon on June 16, 1974 (Giáp Dần).

== Critics and tributes ==
After 1975, his theories were criticized by Nguyễn Phi Hoanh, artist painter (1904–2001), a graduate of l'École des beaux arts of Toulouse, author of the book Mỹ Thuật Việt Nam (Fine Arts of Viêt Nam), published by Nhà Xuất Bản Thành Phố Hồ Chí Minh in November 1984.

In the late 1990s, two exhibitions were organized by two private galleries of Trương Văn Ý and Bùi Quốc Chí of Đức Minh VN Collection for famous painters of Việt Nam, including some of Đào Sĩ Chu's paintings.

April 2002, his painting Young Girl Feeding Chicken (1974) appeared in an auction sale of Sotheby's Singapore. A second auction was organised in France in October, 2009, including one Đào Sï Chu painting, Jeune Femme Pensive (painted in 1962).

In the Vietnam National Museum of Fine Arts, among the contemporary arts, there are nine Dao Si Chu paintings.

From October 2014, a painting of Đào Sĩ Chu could be seen at the Ho Chi Minh City Museum of Fine Arts.

== Original sketches and painting of Young Girl Feeding Chicken ==
This painting was executed by Đào Sĩ Chu in December 1968 and the one in Sotheby's Catalogue April 2002 is only a version which also painted by himself in 1974 as some gifts for his close friends. The face of the young girl is his niece Mai (Đào Lê Như Mai).

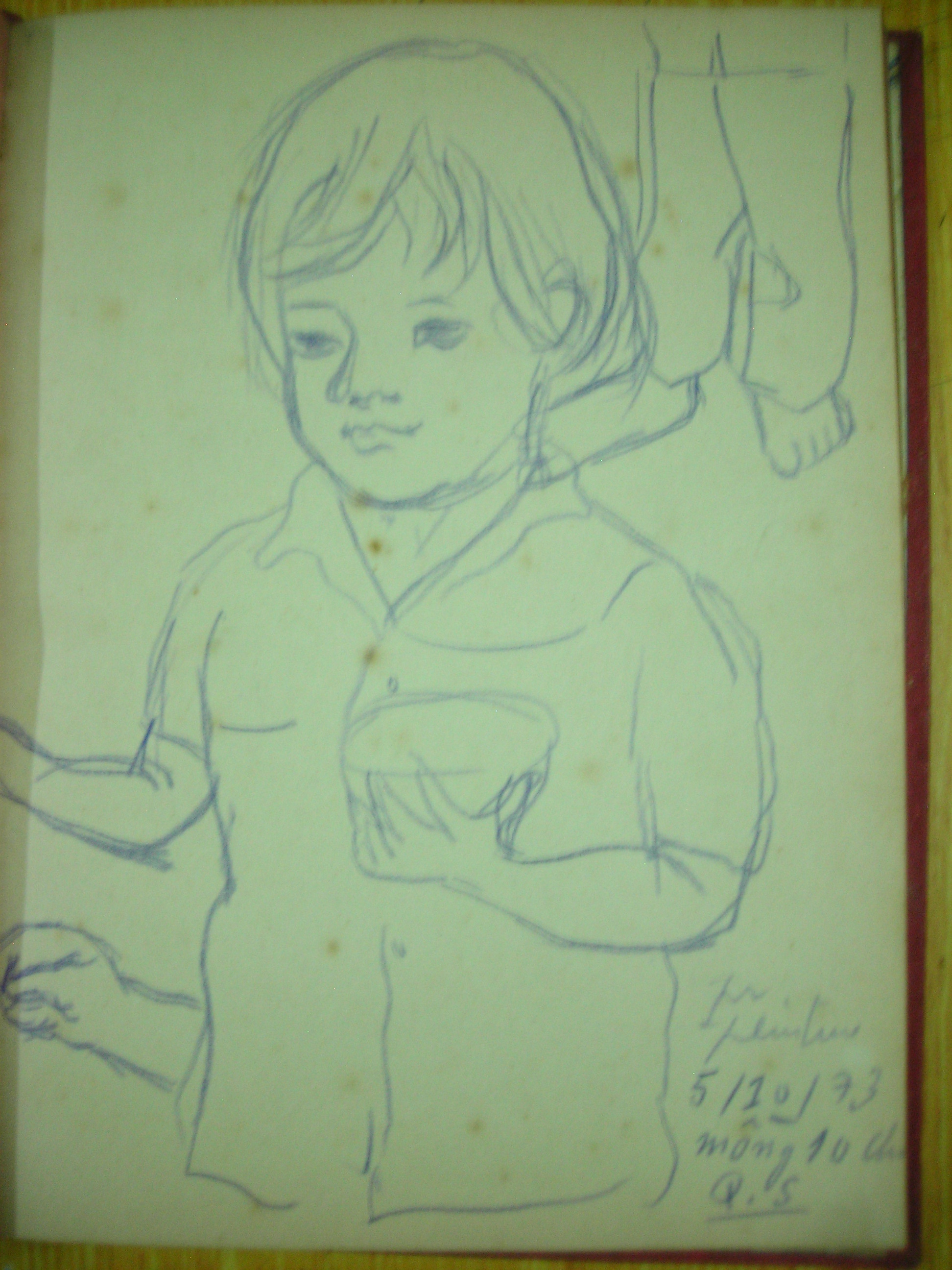

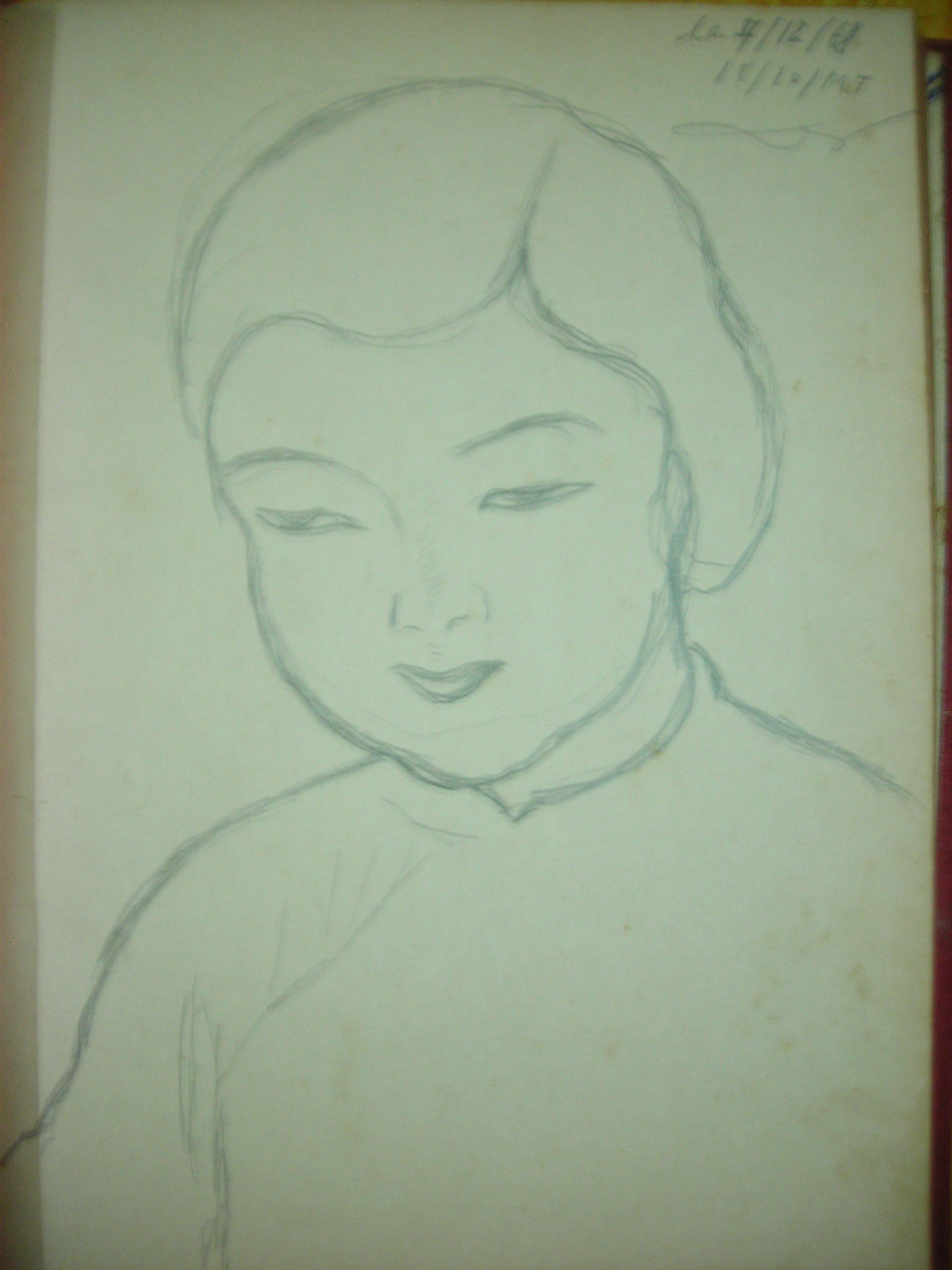

== Musician ==
He was also a musician during the commencement period (1930–1940) of the First Modern Vietnamese Songs in Hà Nội. Most of his songs which were recorded in Pathé's disks 78 rpm, could be lost after the First Indochina War. Except his four songs in 2 disks PA 2854 (S) and PA 2856 (S) which are Gió Thu (Autumn Breeze), Cố Hương (Nostalgia of the Native Land), Phụ Nữ Viêt Nam (Vietnamese Women) and Trong Sương (In the Mist), could be listened to online:

Among the above writing music pieces, during the First Republic of Viet Nam, the Phụ Nữ was an official march for the celebration of Trưng Sisters' Day and Vietnamese Women Day in 1957 and The Hoàng Hôn was played by the Little Orchestra of New York in the Saigon Botanic garden in spring 1959.

However he mostly concentrated on fine arts and was more successful in this field. Although the long-lasting Vietnam War could involve him in some influences and in spite of some critics and accusations, Đào Sĩ Chu is a true artist until his last days.
