= Tuổi thơ dữ dội =

Novel by Phùng Quán

- Author: Phùng Quán
- Language: Vietnamese
- Genre: War novel
- Published: 1988
- Publication place: Vietnam

Tuổi thơ dữ dội is a Vietnamese war novel written by Phùng Quán from 1968 to 1986 and published in 1988. The book takes place in Huế during the First Indochina War. It follows the tales of young teenagers who volunteered for the Viet Minh, operating as recons and scouts.

The novel is a major success in Vietnam, receiving many positive reviews. In 1990 it was adapted into a film.

== Plot ==
The story is set during the first years of the First Indochina War. Mừng, a 12-year-old boy, illegally enters the war-torn city of Huế and sneaks into the then-Trần Cao Vân Regiment consisting of 30 boys around the same age as him, training to be spies and scouts. His purpose was to support the resistance, thus curing his mom, whom he deliberately ran away from in order to join the combat, from her terminal asthma.

After being accepted in the military, Mừng soon finds himself familiarized with fellow soldiers, notably Quỳnh, Lượm, Tư, Kim, Bồng. They take part in a series of battles in Huế, crippling French lines. Despite suffering casualties, the boys don't appear to be affected by PTSD. In fact, they seem to embrace the war. Mừng is later offered a trip to visit his mom on horseback. However, he didn't have the bravery to meet her, leaving the job to his comrade, who also sends her the herbs that Mừng gathered at the camp to improve her condition.

French reinforcements pour into Huế, forcing the Việt Minh to withdraw and set up a base in the mountainous region of Hoà Mỹ (now in Phong Điền).

A team consisting of Kim, Lượm, Tư and leader Đồng re-enters Huế to distribute revolutionary propaganda and newspapers to Huế citizens. Hence, French forces had to strengthen their positions in the city by putting it under martial law. The mission, nonetheless, carried on successfully until Kim encounters Trì, a former Viet Minh and close friend who betrayed the revolution and joined the French forces. Trì captures Kim and has him tortured, the latter succumbed to pain and reveals the entire mission to the enemy. Thus, Đồng was killed, Lượm was captured. Tư managed to run back to the base.

Lượm was imprisoned alongside Thúi, an innocent orphan around the same age as him who was mistaken for Tư. He attempted to escape prison twice, but failed, causing him to be jailed in Thừa Phủ - an infamous prison in Huế. Here, he befriends fellow guerillas and captured fighters and flung into conflict with a gang of pickpockets and thieves, led by the infamous Lép. All hopes of fleeing seem to be fading for Lượm until he is selected to work in a French post office in Huế, thanks to his relatively good French. He plans to flee by replacing Thúi with a sympathetic worker. In addition, he cures Lép from cholera and makes friends with him. In return, Lép gets rid of Lượm's dangerous co-worker Tụng, (who had been trying to do the same to Lượm) and replaces him. Together, at noon break, they drug the guard, steal an M1911 and an SMG, kill Trì (who spotted them en route) and plan to return to the base. Afterwards, their fates remain unknown.

Meanwhile, the resistance base in Phong Điền is still very busy. Mừng, despite being quite illiterate, is very good at maps and directions and provided a good position for the army that can see the entire Hòa Mỹ-on a very high tree. He takes care of Quỳnh, who still needs medical attention from his infected wound. The latter appears to be a very good composer. Other members of the squad, such as Bồng, also scout other parts of Huế, raiding French strongholds and camps.

Quỳnh, whose father is, ironically, a very high-ranking official of Annam, is offered the chance to return home for a better life (Quỳnh was fascinated by revolutionary songs, much to his father's anger, thus he joined the Viet Minh). Despite a very promising and lucrative deal, Quỳnh pledged his loyalty to the Viet Minh. At the exact moment that he does so, which some of his relatives are present, he suffered a stroke from his wounds and dies. He was given a very large funeral.

Kim returns to the base. He betrayed the Viet Minh and now returns as a mole, using Mừng's naïve nature to cover up his actions of espionage. But at the end, Mừng learned of Kim's activities and fights him in the jungle, while Kim was deserting. However, Kim overpowers Mừng, knocks him out and brings him to the enemy.

Mừng was able to re-enter Hòa Mỹ, but is captured immediately as he has been wanted for treason. In spite of solid evidence that he was indeed abducted by Kim, his cases are denied and he is jailed.

French forces gather outside of Hòa Mỹ and besiege the base. After relentless fighting, the entire army had to withdraw southwards, leaving only a few men behind to hold off the enemy. Viet Minh forces intend to detonate a large land mine that could wipe out a large amount of French infantry and vehicles as they enter a pre-planned area. The boy scouts are ordered to watch the fight from the position that Mừng provided to give the signal.

Mừng meets his mother in the base's makeshift hospital after she had volunteered to supply the army with rations and been shot by the French. She had searched for Mừng around the province, only to find out in the end that her son is rumored to be an enemy spy. About to succumb to bleeding and wounds, she confesses to Mừng everything that she had hidden from him: that they are actually from Quảng Trị, Mừng was actually born out of wedlock, and his biological father had died before he was born – the abusive, treacherous man that he calls father is just a bully to his mom. Just as she finished, she passes away, and the hospital is bombed.

A devastated Mừng is freed from his escort as the latter took cover when a bomb struck nearby. Suddenly knowing what to do, Mừng ignores his feelings and rushes to the watchtower. The entire crew sacrificed in a bombing. Hearing the noises from the radio above, Mừng climbs up the tree and gives the decisive signal that ignited the Vietnamese land mine, destroying large quantities of French troops. In the chaos, Mừng is suddenly sniped and critically wounded. As he was dying, he pleaded his commander to “stop suspecting” him, before finally collapsing.

In the end, the French had to abandon their positions in Hòa Mỹ. The Viet Minh also withdraw this base and head for Dương Hòa (now in Hương Thủy). Mừng is buried next to his mother on a mountain, which is named after them.

== Reception, adaption ==
In Vietnam, the book received mostly positive reviews and is regarded as one of the best military fictions of the country, comparable to The Sorrows of War. Despite this, there has not been any foreign translations of it.

It received the Vietnamese Children's Literature Prize from the Vietnamese Writers' Association in 1990, the book was adapted into a film in the same year.
