= Nguyễn Trung Hiếu =

Vietnamese sports shooter

Personal information
- Nationality: Vietnamese
- Born: 21 September 1979 (age 46) Hanoi, Vietnam
- Height: 169 cm (5 ft 7 in)
- Weight: 55 kg (121 lb)

Sport
- Sport: Sports shooting
Medal record
Men's sport shooting
Representing Vietnam
Southeast Asian Games
| Bronze medal – third place | 2003 Vietnam | 25 m Standard Pistol |

Nguyễn Trung Hiếu (born 21 September 1979) is a Vietnamese sports shooter.

He won the bronze medal at the 2003 SEA Games in the 25 m Standard Pistol event.

He competed in the men's 25 metre rapid fire pistol event at the 2000 Summer Olympics.

He represented his country also at other international competitions, including the 1998 Asian Games and 2002 Asian Games.
