= Nguyen Manh Tuong =

Vietnamese activist (1909–1997)

Professor Nguyễn Mạnh Tường
- Born: 1909; Từ Liêm, Hà Nội, Tonkin (French protectorate)
- Died: June 13, 1997 (aged 87–88); Hà Nội, Việt Nam
- Citizenship: Vietnam
- Education: University of Montpellier

Nguyễn Mạnh Tường (1909–1997) was a Vietnamese lawyer and intellectual. He was known to be one of the active participators in the Nhân Văn affair in the mid-1950s which saw many intellectuals demanding freedom and democracy in communist-led North Vietnam. After he criticised the disastrous land reform campaign in 1956, he was stripped of all positions he held in the government and was forced to retire from practicing law.

== Biography ==
Nguyễn Mạnh Tường was born in 1909 in the Hàng Đào street of Hà Nội. He graduated from the Lycée Albert Sarraut at age 16 and studied overseas at the University of Montpellier in southern France in 1927. At age 22, he became the first Vietnamese person to receive two doctorates in France: Juris Doctor (with the dissertation L'individu dans la vieille cité annamite, Code des Lê, D.E., Droit, Montpellier, Imp. de la Presse Montpellier 1932) and a Doctor d'État in Literature (L'Annam dans la littérature française, D.E., Lettres, Montpellier 1932). According to the press of the time, a young Vietnamese person with two doctorates was unheard of in the French educational system. A good friend of his was Nguyễn Văn Huyên, who was working toward a Doctor of Letters in France.

Returning to Vietnam in 1936, Nguyễn Mạnh Tường taught French literature in Hanoi at the Lycée du Protectorat (trường Trung học Bảo hộ or trường Bưởi, since 1945 named Chu Văn An High School). Dissatisfied with prejudiced French policies, he left the school and opened a law firm.

While participating in the Vietnamese resistance against France (see First Indochina War), he worked as a lawyer and taught in Thanh Hóa until the Partition of Vietnam in 1954, when he moved back to Hanoi and became a professor at University of Literature (Đại học Văn khoa, now Vietnam National University, Hanoi).

After 1954, he became dean at the Hanoi University of Law (Đại học Luật Hà Nội), vice-chairman of the Vietnamese Lawyers Association (Hội Luật gia Việt Nam); chair of the Vietnam Law Group (Đoàn Luật sư Việt Nam); vice-dean at the Hanoi National University of Education (Đại học Sư phạm Hà Nội); member of the Central Committee of the Vietnamese Fatherland Front; member of the Vietnam-France Friendship Society (Hội Hữu nghị Việt-Pháp), Vietnamese-Soviet Friendship Society (Hội Hữu nghị Việt-Xô), and Committee for the Protection of World Peace (Uỷ ban Bảo vệ Hoà bình Thế giới); founder of the Unity Club (Câu lạc bộ Đoàn Kết); and vice-provost at Hanoi National University of Education; he also conducted education research. He joined the Vietnamese government delegation at diplomatic talks in Đà Lạt and other peace talks in Beijing and Vienna.
