= Lê Đạt =

Vietnamese poet (1929 – 2008)

Lê Nhân Đạt
- Born: September 9, 1929; Yên Bái, French Indochina
- Died: April 21, 2008 (aged 78); Hanoi, Vietnam
- Occupation: Poet

Lê Nhân Đạt, pen name Lê Đạt (September 9, 1929 – April 21, 2008) was a Vietnamese poet. He was one of the poets associated with the Nhân Văn-Giai Phẩm movement. As one of the longest-lived Nhân Văn poets Đạt's influence has been felt more strongly in his continued writings.
