= Lycée Albert Sarraut =

School in Hanoi, Vietnam

Coordinates: 21.0235°N 105.856°E

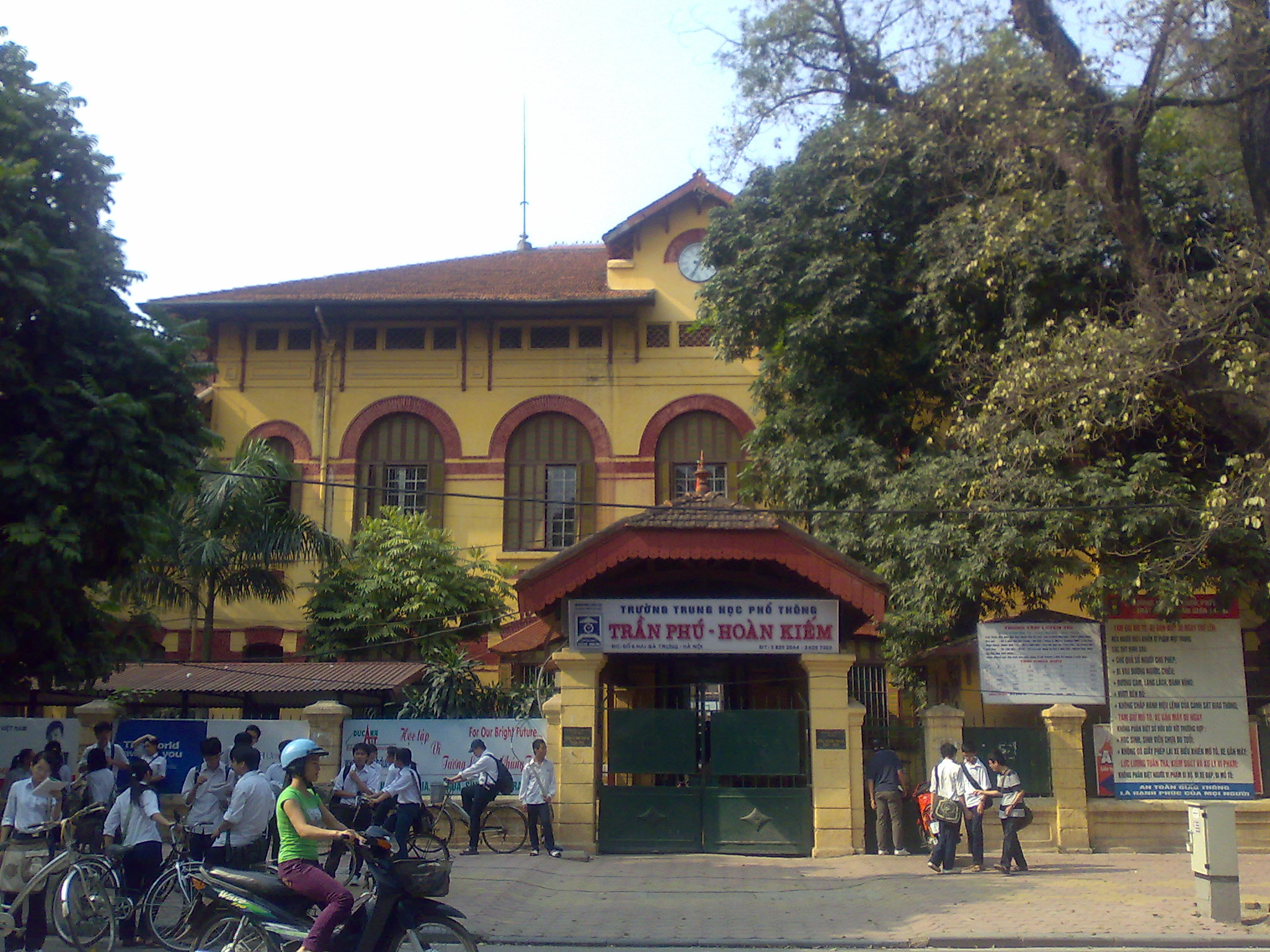
School gate at noon in summer 2009

Lycée Albert Sarraut (French pronunciation: [lise albɛʁ saʁo]) was a French lyceum in Hanoi, Vietnam, during the French colonial period and in the early post-colonial period, active from 1919 to 1965. It was one of 69 high schools founded by the French in their colonies worldwide, named for Albert Sarraut. The school offered high standard academic programs for students between the ages of 11 and 18.

It is currently the Trần Phú - Hoàn Kiếm High School.

== Former students ==
Many Vietnamese scholars and leaders graduated from lycée Albert Sarraut. Among them were:

- Bui Tuong Phong, a pioneer computer scientist
- Hoàng Xuân Hãn
- Nguyen Tien Lang
- Hoàng Văn Chí
- Nguyễn Phan Long
- Phạm Văn Đồng
- Madame Nhu (Trần Lệ Xuân), former First Lady of South Vietnam
- Nguyễn Mạnh Tường: Lawyer, participant in the Nhân Văn–Giai Phẩm affair
- Đào Sĩ Chu, artist painter
- Lê Thành Khôi, Vietnamese-French scientist in education and economics, author of history and UNESCO consultant
- Nhất Linh (Nguyên Tuong Tam) - the leader of Tu Luc Van Doan, and Khái Hưng Tran Khanh Giu - an acclaimed Vietnamese novelist who later was killed by the Việt Minh also received their education here.
- From the Vietnamese Communist Party, General Võ Nguyên Giáp, and the former Secretary General Trường Chinh had graduated from this lycée.

Princes from Laos were educated at the school, including:

- Prince Souphanouvong. b at Luang Prabang, 13 July 1909, the first president of the Lao PDR and leader of the Pathet Lao movement.
- Prince Kham-Phan Panya. b. at Luang Prabang, 29 March 1908 (s/o Mom Kamala), educ. Lycée Albert Sarraut, Hanoi
- Prince Kham-Mao. b. at Luang Prabang, 23 September 1911 (s/o Mom Kamabuwa), educ. Lycée Albert Sarraut, Hanoi
- Prince Kham-Hing. b. at Wat Nong, Luang Prabang, 15 July 1918 (s/o Mom Kamala), educ. Luang Prabang and Lycée Albert Sarraut, Hanoi (B.Phil. 1939).

== See also ==
- Lycée français Alexandre Yersin – the modern French international school in Hanoi
