= Le Travail movement =

The Le Travail movement was an anti-French-colonialism movement led by the intellectuals of Vietnam in 1936 by means of Le Travail (French: [lə tʁavaj], Labor) newspaper. The movement lasted only seven months, from September 1936 to April 1937. However, many participants of this movement went on to fulfil their historical oaths.

== Background ==
In the last decade of the 19th century, France experienced numerous social problems. From 1890 to 1914, vagabonds were banished to colonial prisons, and unemployed people and labouring poor and rural migrants to cities were an overwhelming problems. Many important social reforms were introduced, and the French Communist and Socialist parties were established.

In 1936, the Communists and Socialists took part in the new Front Populaire government. Võ Nguyên Giáp, then was a student of the lycée Albert Sarraut in Hanoi, North Vietnam, viewed this as an opportunity to use it as a political tool for the Vietnamese anticolonialist-movement.

Le Travail was a socialist newspaper written in French published by the students of the Lycée Albert Sarraut in Hanoi, during the French colonial period. The first issue was published on September 16, 1936. Võ Nguyên Giáp was the editor in chief. Trường Chinh joined in when he was released from jail late 1936. By then Trường Chinh had been a longtime member of the Politburo and a communist functionary. Soon thereafter Phạm Văn Đồng also came to work at Le Travail (Đồng was also a Politburo member and long time communist functionary).

Vo Nguyên Giap stated that the paper had to be written in French to get around colonial administrative difficulties.

== Establishment of the newspaper ==
Apparently, Vo Nguyên Giap had tried to publish another paper few months earlier under the name Hon Tre Tap Moi [Soul of Youth, new edition] in Vietnamese, to fight for democracy, to claim amnesty for political prisoners, and to approve of the French Front Populaire.

Vo Nguyên Giap had found out from a news bulletin that in May 1936, the French "Front Populaire" composed of ten political organizations, among them the communist and socialist parties, forming the nucleus of the Front, had won general elections.

Vo Nguyên Giap then was preoccupied with how to fight the anticolonialist war, immediately thought of taking advantage of this situation for his movement. The news paper was used as a political tool.

Hon Tre Tap Moi was practically the first newspaper in Vietnam to promote democracy, and demand amnesty for the political prisoners. It was published on June 6, 1936, two days after Léon Blum, then the new French prime minister came to power. The paper was a success until the French closed it down on the fifth issue.

To get around the problems, Vo Nguyên Giap had decided to publish a newspaper in French. Thus Le Travail was born on September 16, 1936. Vo Nguyên Giap became the editor in chief. Trường Chinh joined in when he was released from jail in late 1936. [Chinh was already a longtime member of the Politburo and a communist functionary]. Soon thereafter Phạm Văn Đồng also came to work at Le Travail (Dong was also a Politburo member and long time communist functionary).

== Life of Le Travail ==
Many students from Albert Sarraut joined in without much knowledge about communism, including Hoàng Văn Chí.

On 16 April 1937 the French Resident ordered stopping all publication of Le Travail. By then thirty issues of the paper had been published over the seven months of its existence.
