= Đào Duy Anh =

Vietnamese historian and lexicographer

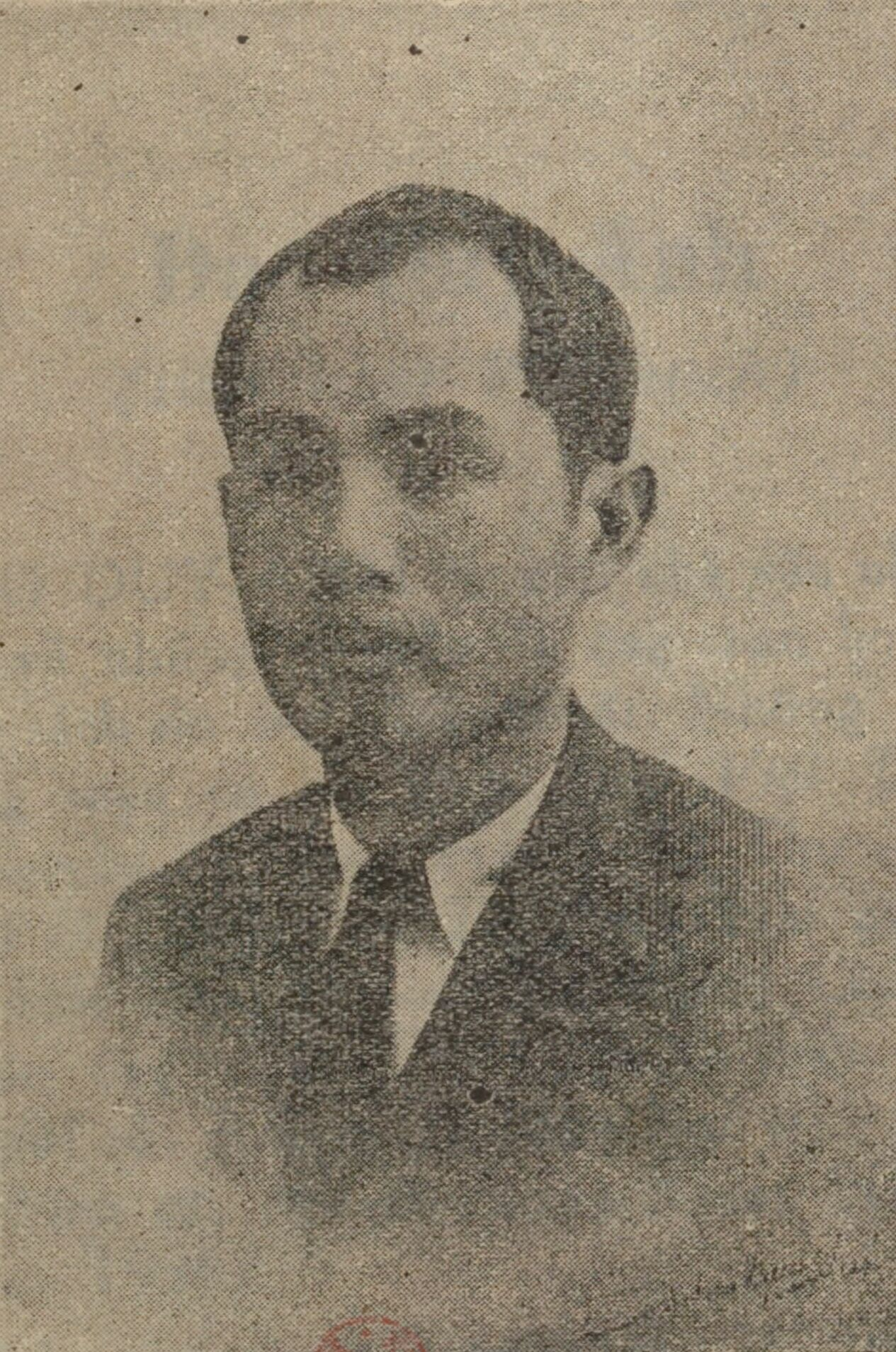
Portrait of Mr. Đào Duy Anh in his youth

Đào Duy Anh (25 April 1904 – 1 April 1988) was a Vietnamese historian and lexicographer. He was born in Thanh Oai, Hà Tây, now, Hanoi. He was one of the writers associated with the Nhân Văn-Giai Phẩm affair. He was the general editor of what was long regarded as the most scholarly dictionary of Vietnamese, the Pháp-Việt Từ điển. Towards the end of his life he wrote on the earliest archeological evidence for chữ Nôm.
