= Trần Dần =

Vietnamese poet and novelist

Trần Dần

Trần Dần (1926–1997) was a Vietnamese poet and novelist noted for his radical works. He is the father of the painter Trần Trọng Vũ.

== Life ==
Dần is best known to be one of the active participators in the Nhân Văn–Giai Phẩm affair in the mid-1950s which saw many middle class intellectuals demanding for freedom and democracy in communist-led North Vietnam. Born in Nam Định, he joined the Vietnamese Communist resistance against the French domination in 1946, but by 1953 he had fallen out with the party. In 1956, he was jailed for months in Hỏa Lò Prison also known as the Hanoi Hilton, where he tried to commit suicide. On leaving prison he joined the Nhân Văn Giai Phẩm. Until 1988, he was banned from having his works published, although he continued to write novels and poems.

In 2007, he posthumously received the State Prize given by the government of the Socialist Republic of Vietnam. In February 2008, a collection of his poems, considered to be the most complete of his works, was allowed to be published in Vietnam, but shortly after publication, the Ministry of Culture and Information fined the publisher 15 million VND for "violating administrative publishing policy" and stopped it from being distributed, but did not confiscate copies that have already been printed. News of the book banning caused concerns among many intellectuals in Vietnam; and 134 leading intellectuals specializing in literature had signed a petition requesting that the government reconsider and repeal its decision to ban the book. The government responded by emphasizing that it did not fine the publisher for the contents of the book nor because of the author.
