= Phùng Quán =

Vietnamese poet (1932 – 1995)

- Born: January 1932; Hương Thủy, Thừa Thiên-Huế
- Died: January 22, 1995 (aged 62–63)

Phùng Quán was a Vietnamese novelist and poet. He was one of the poets associated with the Nhân Văn-Giai Phẩm movement.

== Works ==
- Tuổi thơ dữ dội (Stormy childhood) - Novel series with seven installments
- Masterpiece of Spring
- Vượt Côn Đảo (Escape from Côn Đảo)
