= Nguyễn Hữu Đang =

Vietnamese journalist and poet

Nguyễn Hữu Đang (15 August 1913 – 2007) was a Vietnamese journalist and poet. He also used the pen name Phạm Đình Thái. He was one of the writers associated with the Nhân Văn-Giai Phẩm movement. Nguyễn Hữu Đặng was one of the five most active participants in the movement with Lưu Thị Yến, Trần Thiện Bảo, Phan Tại and Lê Nguyên Chí, all of whom received periods of imprisonment.

He was born in Vũ Công, Kiến Xương, Thái Bình.
