= Hoang Van Chi =

Vietnamese political writer

Hoàng Văn Chí
- Born: 1 October 1913; Thanh Hóa, Annam, French Indochina
- Died: 6 July 1988 (aged 74); Bowie, Maryland, United States
- Other name: "Mạc Định"
- Education: Lycée Albert Sarraut; University of Indochina
- Occupation: Author
- Notable work: From Colonialism to Communism
- Political party: French Section of the Workers' International (1937–1939)
- Movement: Le Travail movement
- Spouse: Lê Hằng Phấn (m. 1940)
- Relatives: Lê Dư (father-in-law)

Hoàng Văn Chí (1 October 1913 – 6 July 1988) was one of the first modern Vietnamese political writers, a intellectual who was an opponent of colonialism and later of communism in Vietnam. He used the pen name Mạc Định. His book, From Colonialism to Communism, was translated into more than 15 languages. He was born in Thanh Hóa, French Indochina and died in Bowie, Maryland, United States.

== Life ==
=== Early life and education ===
Hoàng Văn Chí was educated according to the French system, attending the Lycée Albert Sarraut in Hanoi from 1928 to 1935. Then he went on to the University of Indochina, where he graduated with a bachelor's degree in Science in 1940.

Already in 1926, at the age of 13, the young Hoàng had joined a protest demanding the end of French occupation which took place at famed nationalist Phan Châu Trinh's funeral. In 1940 he married Lê Hằng Phấn, daughter of the Vietnamese scholar, Sở Cuồng Lê Dư. He was at this time preparing to enter medical school and had acquired enough knowledge to treat his wife's tuberculosis with an advanced technique: letting the affected side of the lung rest by a controlled pneumothorax while treating it with antibiotics.

=== Fighting French colonialism ===
In 1936, Hoàng Văn Chí joined the Le Travail Movement. From 1937 to 1939, he actively joined and worked for the French Section of the Workers' International (SFIO, a socialist party). It was falsely claimed by CIA official George Carver that he joined the Việt Minh to fight against the French colonists in Vietnam. In reality, Chí never joined the Viet Minh, instead working as a teacher in Thanh Hoá province from 1950 to 1955.

=== Rejection of communism ===
Hoang originated from a wealthy, landowning background which found itself at odds with the Viet Minh's ideals, leading him to be antagonistic towards communism. Hoang knew some writers and poets for the Nhân Văn ("Humanities") and Giai Phẩm ("Masterpieces") periodicals which in 1956 were suppressed by the Communist Party of Vietnam. They were all either harassed or imprisoned for criticizing the policies of the DRV, especially after Cải Cách Ruộng Đất (Land reform in Vietnam). Their cases later were made known to an international audience in his book, The Nhân Văn Affair. Hoàng came to the conclusion that communism was the wrong choice for Vietnam. In 1954, after the Geneva Agreements, together with another almost 900,000 North Vietnamese, Hoàng left North Vietnam for the South.

In 1955, Hoàng joined the government of South Vietnam, under Ngô Đình Diệm. Until 1960, he headed the Mặt Trận Bảo Vệ Tự Do Văn Hóa (Congress of Cultural Freedom), speaking up for those he felt were silenced by the government the North. He researched and gathered information about life in the North, and published Phật Rơi Lệ (Buddha Cries) (1956) The New Class in North Vietnam, The Nhân Văn Affair, and Trăm Hoa Đua Nở Trên Đất Bắc (Hundreds of Flowers Competing to Bloom in the North) (1959). These books were all exposés of the situations of writers in the North, and of violations of freedom of speech.

=== Declined position in Ngô Đình Diệm's government ===
Disappointed with the presidency of Ngô Đình Diệm in the South, he tried to go abroad. Hoàng Văn Chí requested reassignment to India since he had known a student of Mohandas K. Gandhi, Jaya Prakhash Narayan, who was the founder of Congress of Cultural Freedom in India. In 1959, he was appointed to work in the South Vietnamese Embassy in New Delhi. Narayan also helped Chí to obtain a grant of US$2,000 from the Congress of Cultural Freedom in France to work on his studies about the land reform in Vietnam in the North. In 1960, he left the post for France, where he lived until 1965, engaging in writing and cultural activities.

=== Continued writing and activism ===
From 1960 to 1962, Hoàng wrote From Colonialism to Communism, an account of events in Vietnam from the 1940s to 1955, especially the land reform in Vietnam. The book was published first in 1962, at the same time in New York, London, and New Delhi. This book was well received and was translated into various languages, including Urdu, Spanish, Japanese, and Arabic, though some voiced skepticism as to why Hoàng had not spoken much on the purported land reform excesses while they were occurring. The book was translated by Mạc Định (penname of Hoàng Văn Chí) into Vietnamese under the title: Từ Thực Dân đến Cộng Sản.

However, it was criticised by Gareth Porter in 1973 because Chi had misrepresented and fabricated evidence in his book. Besides appearing to be an ex-cadre knowledgeable in DRV affairs when in truth he never joined them, he misconstrued evidence about the land reforms such as Giap's speech acknowledging its issues: "the unjust disciplining of innocent people" was changed to "executed too many honest people", "repressive measures" as "terror", and "coercive methods" as "torture" - significantly altering the meaning of the speech, and adding that "torture came to be regarded as normal practice during party reorganisation", something Giap never said. On top of this, he disseminated manufactured claims, such as the phrase "Better kill ten innocent people than let one enemy escape", which was acknowledged by Nguyen Van Chau, chief of the psychological warfare department at the time, to be from a "false document"

He wrote for and contributed to North Vietnam Today and Vietnam Seen from East and West. In 1965, the United States Department of State invited Hoàng Văn Chí to resettle in the United States, where he continued working for an independent, free, democratic Vietnam. From 1965 to 1969, he worked as news editor for the Voice of America, specializing in North Vietnam. From 1970 to 1979 he worked for USAID, teaching culture and philosophy to classes of diplomats, U.S. State Department staff, and in universities. He especially enjoyed holding seminars about many different topics related to culture and education for young students in America, Canada and Australia. From 1975, with waves of boat people leaving Vietnam, Hoàng and his wife actively supported the Boat People SOS organization, organizing many fund-raising activities and helping newcomers to resettle. In 1987, Hoàng was invited to Paris, France, to speak about Vietnam at the Paris Peace Accords conference. In the 1980s, Hoàng started to work on his passion: formulating a direction to help Vietnam change from Communism to an independent, free, and democratic country. He had finished the last chapter of Duy Van Su Quan ("Humanism") in 1988 when he suffered a heart attack and died, aged 74.

== Views ==
Hoàng Văn Chí represented a class of Vietnamese intellectuals caught between colonialism, nationalism, communism and capitalism, in a society traditionally run by Confucianism. Similar figures were Phan Khôi and Nguyễn Tường Tam (whose pen-name was Nhất Linh). During the fight for independence from the French colonialism, these intellectuals had tried to find new directions for Vietnam. The ideals of liberal democracy, equality, human rights and civil rights led them into conflict with the Vietnamese governments of both North and South. Phan Khôi and his Nhan-Van Giai Pham group were disbanded and imprisoned by the DRV. Nguyễn Tường Tam committed suicide the day before Ngô Đình Diệm summoned him to a court hearing due to his political writings. Hoàng Văn Chí was able to escape from both the North and South Vietnamese governments during this time to continue his search for a new direction.

=== Humanism and heritage ===
Hoàng's answer to communism was Duy Văn Sử Quan or Humanism, defined as preservation of the beauty in humanity and heritage. He believed that harmony of mind and emotion, developed in the right environment (an appropriate mix of political-economic and cultural foundations) would produce the best results and benefit the people and the country, as well as taking their culture to another level of power. Hoàng believed that this preservation of humanity and heritage in a free and democratic society was the way to counteract what he saw as the destruction caused by communism in Vietnam.

=== Preserving a traditional Vietnamese lifestyle ===
While he spent most of his time devoting to writing, researching, and teaching, Hoàng and his wife maintained a simple traditional Vietnamese lifestyle. In the early 1970s, he built a greenhouse where he grew Vietnamese herbs and vegetables. Most remembered by his community are the white eggplants, a part of the traditional North Vietnamese daily meal. In 1979, Hoàng and his wife founded the Vietnam Food and Drink Company in Bowie, Maryland, in order to promote Vietnamese food and drink. The first successful product was "Tương Cự Đà", a sauce made by a fermentation process using soybeans and sweet rice. The second product was "Thính Quê Hương", a Vietnamese spice made from roasted rice powder, used in Vietnamese cooking to add flavor to roast beef (bò tái) and shredded pork (bì). These two products enjoyed international sales at a time when Vietnam was still closed to the outside world. The Vietnam Food and Drink Company delivered products to Asian and Vietnamese supermarkets in the United States and worldwide, as well as by mail order.

== Publications ==
=== From Colonialism to Communism ===
From Colonialism to Communism: A Case Study of North Vietnam describes the DRV from 1940 to 1955, during the transition from the French colonial rule to communism. It also documents the land reform in Vietnam in 1954. The book was written in exile in India and France, between 1960 and 1962. The first edition was published in 1962, in New York, London, and New Delhi. Between 1962 and 1964, foreign language editions were published in Japanese, Urdu, Spanish, Arabic and Vietnamese.

== Select bibliography ==
- 1956 - Phật Rơi Lệ ("Buddha Cries")
- 1959 - Trăm Hoa Đua Nở Trên Đất Bắc ("A Hundred Flowers Bloom in the North")
- 1959 - The New Class in North Vietnam
- 1959 - The Nhân Văn Affair
- 1964 - From Colonialism to Communism
- 1990 - Duy Văn Sử Quan ("Humanism"), published posthumously by his son, Dr.Hoàng Việt Dũng, in association with Cành Nam Publishers
