= Tran Duc Thao =

Phenomenology and Marxist philosophy

Trần Đức Thảo
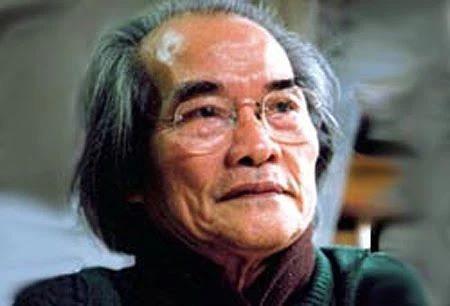
- Born: 26 September 1917; Thái Bình, Tonkin French Indochina
- Died: April 24, 1993 (aged 75); Paris, France

Academic background
- Education: École Normale Supérieure
- Academic advisor: Maurice Merleau-Ponty

Trần Đức Thảo (26 September 1917 – 24 April 1993) was a Vietnamese philosopher. His work (written primarily in French) attempted to unite phenomenology with Marxist philosophy. His work had some currency in France in the 1950s and 1960s, and was cited favorably by Jacques Derrida, Jean-François Lyotard and Louis Althusser.

== Life ==
=== Studies in France ===
Trần Đức Thảo was born in French Indochina, he was educated there, completing his baccalaureate at 17. In 1936, he continued his studies in France, becoming a student of Maurice Merleau-Ponty at the École Normale Supérieure where he wrote a dissertation for a diplôme d'études supérieures (roughly equivalent to an MA thesis) on Hegel. In 1943, he completed his agrégation with a thesis on the phenomenology of Edmund Husserl, being received premier ex aequo alongside Jules Vuillemin. Through the 1940s, he worked on his first book, Phenomenology and Dialectical Materialism. The book argued that the defects of the phenomenological account of consciousness could only be remedied by the Marxist account of labor and society. In the 1940s and 50s, Trần Đức Thảo's ideas achieved some currency among the elite philosophical circles of France. At the same time, he became an active anti-colonialist, publishing articles in Jean-Paul Sartre and Merleau-Ponty's journal Les Temps modernes about colonialism in Indochina; these articles were read by Frantz Fanon and other anticolonialists. From October to December 1945, Trần Đức Thảo was jailed by the French government as a threat to its security.

=== Return to Vietnam, 1951 ===
Phenomenology and Dialectical Materialism was published in 1951, and in the same year he returned to Vietnam, working in support of the Communist Party. In 1956, he was named the Dean of History in the country's first national university.

However, he became critical of the Party over land reforms which had led to many deaths in 1956, and Trần Đức Thảo was caught up in the Nhan Van-Giai Pham affair, in which the dissident intellectuals of the late 1950s were publicly criticized or punished. Though Trần was never jailed, he fell out of favor with the ruling Party, publishing two self-criticisms in Nhân Dân and leaving his position of authority in 1958. None of his work was published in his home country from 1965 until 1987.

=== Work on Recherches sur l'origine du langage et de la conscience ===
For the next thirty years, his profile was lower, as he worked in the rural provinces translating philosophy into Vietnamese and preparing his book Investigations into the Origin of Language and Consciousness. This book, published in France in 1973, combined materialist biological and cognitive accounts of subjectivity and consciousness with the Marxist account he had elaborated earlier. In the liberalized political climate of the 1980s, he was able to return to France for medical treatment, and there he met many of his old philosophical colleagues again, although he lived in poverty in an apartment at the Vietnamese embassy. He died in Paris in 1993 and was cremated at the Père Lachaise Cemetery.

== Works ==
- Phénoménologie et matérialisme dialectique (1951), Phenomenology and Dialectical Materialism English edition: ISBN 90-277-0737-5
- “The Phenomenology of Mind and its Real Content”. Telos 8 (Summer 1971). New York: Telos Press.
- Recherches sur l'origine du langage et de la conscience (1973) Investigations into the Origin of Language and Consciousness . English edition: ISBN 90-277-0827-4

== Sources ==
- Herrick, Tim. "'A book which is no longer discussed today': Tran Duc Thao, Jacques Derrida, and Maurice Merleau-Ponty." Journal of the History of Ideas 66:1 (2005).
- McHale, Shawn. "Vietnamese Marxism, Dissent, and the Politics of Postcolonial Memory: Tran Duc Thao, 1946-1993." Journal of Asian Studies 61:1 (Feb. 2002).
- Spire, Arnaud. "Tran Duc Thao, un marxiste dérangeant" (obituary). L'Humanité 26 April 1993. (In French.)
- D'Alonzo, Jacopo. "L’origine du langage chez Tran-Duc-Thao. Perspectives historiques et enjeux théoriques", dans Valentina Bisconti, Rossana De Angelis & Anamaria Curea "Héritages, réceptions, écoles en sciences du langage. Avant et après Saussure", p. 265-272. Paris: Presses de la Sorbonne Nouvelle 2019.
- D'Alonzo, Jacopo. "Prefazione del curatore", in Tran Duc Thao, "La dialettica materialista della coscienza", ed. by Jacopo D’Alonzo, p. 5-24. Roma: Castelvecchi Editore 2019.
- D'Alonzo, Jacopo. "Langage intérieur et origine de la conscience: le cas de Tran Duc Thao". Histoire Epistémologie Language 41.1:159-177. Paris: SHESL 2019. [DOI: 10.1051/hel/2019008]
- D'Alonzo, Jacopo. ". Tran-Duc-Thao and the Language of the Real Life." Language Sciences 70:45-57 [Special Issue: Karl Marx and the Language Sciences: critical encounters ed. by Peter E Jones]. Amsterdam: Elsevier 2018.
- D'Alonzo, Jacopo. "Tran-Duc-Thao: Consciousness & Language. Report of the Centenary Conference." Acta Structuralica - International Journal for Structuralist Research 3:31-50. 2018.
- D'Alonzo, Jacopo. "semiologia dialettica di Tran-Duc-Thao: Alcune considerazioni su Saussure, fenomenologia e strutturalismo". Acta Structuralica - International Journal for Structuralist Research 2:1.53-86. 2017.
- D'Alonzo, Jacopo. "L’origine del linguaggio e della coscienza. Storia di un libro mai pubblicato: dal carteggio inedito tra Ferruccio Rossi-Landi e Tran-Duc-Thao." Acta Structuralica - International Journal for Structuralist Research 2:1.87-152. 2017.
- D'Alonzo, Jacopo. Trần Đức Thảo: A Marxist Theory on Origins of Human Language. " Theoria et Historia Scientiarum 13 The origins and development of language: a historical perspective, pp. 103–120. Nicolaus Copernicus University Press. 2016.
