= Land reform in North Vietnam =

Agrarian reforms, 1953 to 1956

Land reform in North Vietnam (Vietnamese: Cải cách ruộng đất tại miền Bắc Việt Nam, IPA: [kâj.kǎʲk ʐuə̂ˀŋ.ɗʌ̌k tâˀj miə̀n.ɓɐ̌k viə̂ˀt.nām]) was a major campaign by the communist Democratic Republic of Vietnam (DRV) between 1953 and 1956, during the final year of the First Indochina War and its aftermath, when the DRV came to be known as North Vietnam. The goal was to take land from landlords and give it to poor farmers. Influenced by and with direct advisement from China, the reform included land redistribution, rent reduction, and class struggle.

Many landlords were accused of crimes, publicly criticized, imprisoned, or executed. The campaign resulted from and caused further division in rural North Vietnam, and the government later admitted and attempted to rectify its mistakes. In 1956, a "Rectification of Errors" campaign was launched to correct these problems. Despite its violence, the reform changed rural society and helped the government gain control over the countryside.

== Background ==
The land reform project in North Vietnam was a product of the complex interplay of internal and external factors. On 9 March 1945, several years after occupation in Indochina, Japan instigated a military coup, overthrew the Vichy French administration in Indochina and established a puppet indigenous government headed by Tran Trong Kim and Bảo Đại. However, five months later, Japan unconditionally surrendered. Taking advantage of the political vacuum, the Viet Minh seized power by launching a nationwide revolution and founding the Democratic Republic of Vietnam (DRV; later North Vietnam) in Hanoi on September 2.

Soon after that, Vietnam saw an influx of foreign power. The Kuomintang Chinese armies accepted the surrender of Japan in Vietnam North of the 16th parallel, with the British in the south. Both of them negotiated and facilitated the French return. After negotiations between the Viet Minh and the French broke down, the war between them started from late 1946 until 1954; this is called the First Indochina War (1946–1954).

Throughout the 1940s, the Viet Minh fought solely against the French army. In terms of military capability, the Viet Minh was in a position of clear-cut disadvantage; this did not change until the establishment and involvement of the People's Republic of China.

During this period, the DRV government was dominated by the Viet Minh, who were popular among indigenous political forces; its domestic policy was to unite all possible forces for resistance and an independent war. It also embraced peasants, workers, students and some merchants and intellectuals. On 11 November 1945, the ICP declared its dissolution, aiming at downplaying the role of communist ideology by dissolving and forcing the ICP underground to garner more support from the masses.

In October 1949, the Chinese Communist Party (CCP) established the People's Republic of China by winning its political rivalry with the KMT during the Chinese Civil War, which had a major impact on the political landscape of the region in general and Vietnam in particular.

From the CCP's perspective, the Chinese revolutionary model was intended to be exported to Asian countries, including Vietnam. Moreover, the increasing influence in its southern periphery was also for national defense and security. From the perspective of the DRV, communist China was a good ally and paradigm that shared the same ideology and similar approaches to complete the communist revolution. They were glad to conduct a binary revolution at the same time: externally, anti-colonialism; internally, anti-feudalism. Thus, Ho Chi Minh actively sought Chinese aid. Stalin, the Soviet leader and head of the communist world, was also displeased with the Vietnamese communists' temporary suspension of class struggle and urged them to quickly implement land reform. After establishing formal diplomatic relations with the PRC in early 1950, Luo Guibo became the first Chinese ambassador to the DRV, and Chinese aid also flooded into the DRV, the most significant of which was the Chinese advisory group, which was later sent to Northern Vietnam in the same year.

Essentially, Chinese advisory groups had a double mission. The most important one was to provide advice on military affairs. After winning victories in a series of military campaigns, with considerable assistance from August 1950 onward, the DRV not only gradually turned the war situation around but also expanded its controlled areas. This conducive environment facilitated the DRV to carry out its land reform plan.

As a government dominated by the communists, land reform was an integral part of its revolution. After its first trial failed in the 1930s, Vietnamese communists never had a real chance to carry it out, even for a long time after the foundation of the DRV. For the sake of war, communist slogans were even diminished. Instead, they needed support from landowners and landlords. However, Chinese assistance outweighed domestic support from feudal classes, and communism was re-emphasised. The Indochinese party was divided along national lines, and the Vietnamese Workers' Party (VWP) was officially formed in early 1951. Simultaneously, land reform was put on its agenda. More comprehensive and stricter land policies were formulated, and class struggle was emphasized as inseparable from the military struggle for the first time.

On the other hand, the French and American-sponsored State of Vietnam (later South Vietnam) emerged in 1949 and was recognized by Western powers. Particularly after the Bao Dai interval, the DRV faced a competent rival regime which contested its monopolistic representation of the Vietnamese people. In this situation, Truong Chinh, in his report to the party Congress in 1951, pointed out that as soon as the Bao Dai regime was set up, the landlord class aligned itself with the State of Vietnam.

Excepting international and domestic political factors, as Bernard B. Fall pointed out, land reform was also necessary for economic reasons. 90 per cent of the population lived by agriculture, but the problem was the enormous population pressure put upon the relatively small fertile areas. In the Red River delta, 9 million people were crowded into an area of 5790 square miles. The majority of the population under the DRV were peasants but did not have land to till, which was an unjust situation.

After the end of WWII in Indochina, people suffered greatly from famine and a lack of sufficient food due to ongoing conflict. Improving their welfare would consolidate the Viet Minh's regime by garnering more support. Collective ownership as a palliative to landlessness has been a century-old practice throughout Vietnam, and individuals were deprived of rice fields and had to turn to communal land for support.

In Vietnam, there is a saying called "Phép Vua Thua Lệ Làng", literally meaning that the emperor is secondary to village customs and implicitly indicating that national rule at the village level was giving way to autonomous rule by the village itself. This was also true for the DRV government; their influence at the grassroots level was relatively weak. Land reform served as a good way to cement its power at the grassroots level.

== Implementation ==
Land reform in North Vietnam was a grand project. At first, it was a relatively mild campaign; later, it radicalized and had serious consequences. When the top leaders noticed the side effects, they tried to rectify the errors caused.

Pre-1953 communist land policy in DRV

Social revolution is part of the Communist Party-led revolution. However, for a long time, the regime failed to grasp the essential tasks of the Vietnamese national democratic revolution, placing too much emphasis on unity with landlords in the interest of national resistance, and paid little attention to the peasants and land issues. A more mild reform was adopted: landlords agreed to decrease the land rent, and the peasants still needed to pay rent, but with a lower rate. The land rent reduction was formulated in July 1949. The failure to initially implement land reform was one of the reasons why Stalin was unhappy with the Vietnamese communists. To ensure the support of the Soviet Union, which agreed to let China directly help in the war, the Vietnamese Communist Party decided to carry out land reform even before they defeated the French.

All pre-1953 policies had failed to break through the landlords' economic and political power and to serve the interests of the peasants. According to VWP's mouthpiece Nhan Dan, even landlords were allowed to join the party, which somehow dominated the party chapters in many areas. DRV gradually abandoned its former policy toward landlords and peasants. From 14 to 23 November 1953, VWP organized a national conference, in which anti-feudalism was given much emphasis. The most important change was that a new approach was adopted, which was mass mobilization for class struggle.

Land reform constituted two successive campaigns: the land rent reduction campaign (1953–1954) and the land reform campaign proper (1954–1956). The first campaign included eight waves and the second had five waves. According to Hoang Van Chi, who was a former member of DRV and fled to South Vietnam in the mid-1950s, these two campaigns had but one purpose, namely the liquidation of the landowning class and the subsequent establishment of a proletarian dictatorship in the countryside. The only notable difference between them was the degree of violence and the nature of the wealth confiscated.

Land Rent Reduction Campaign

After being trained by a Chinese consultant through the local party cell, Vietnamese cadres were sent to villages in order to live with landless peasants. They practised the "Three Together System", namely, working together, eating together, and living together. By doing so for two to three months, they had amassed much information about the peasants and the village, and also raised awareness of social class by asking the peasants questions, such as why they were poor.

After this survey was conducted by professionally trained cadres, the reduction campaign officially began, with six successive stages. The first stage was to classify the population, during which peasants were categorized according to their possession. This was followed by the classification of landlords. Theoretically speaking, there were three classes of landlords: traitorous, ordinary, resistance and "democratic personalities". Those landlords found non-compliant with the rent reduction decree would be arrested. In this case, they had to pay back the excess land rent within the time limit; this is the third stage of extortion of money and valuables. The fourth stage is crime revelation, the peasants were made to attend a special course and taught how to publicly reveal crimes of landlords, and they would have a role of denouncing crimes in the front of a number of people in the fifth stage, but the problem was that they denounced for appearing faithful and obedient to the party, so they may denounce as much as they can rather than considered the reality.

On 12 April 1953, a special people's tribunal, composed of peasants who knew nothing of law, was formed by decree 150/SL. Sentences varied from the death penalty to years' hard labor, for this point, the most well-known case was Nguyen Thi Nam, a patriotic landlord who joined the resistance war against the French but was sentenced to death.

The label of landlord is dangerous. According to Hoang's memoir, as soon as a man was defined as a landlord, he and his family were isolated from their fellow human beings, and no one was permitted to speak to them or even have any contact with them. This policy of isolation even caused a number of deaths.

Land Reform Campaign Proper

In the year of 1953, a series of decrees and laws on land reform were released. VWP central committee assessed the possibility of moving on to the last phase of land revolution: redistribution of agricultural land, which was followed by the most crucial land reform law publicized on 19 December 1953, which can be regarded as the platform and premise for land reform. Very soon after the law was passed in the national congress, the experimental wave of land reform took place between December 1953 and March 1954 in Thai Nguyen province. This experiment was fruitful according to the official, and a Central Land Reform Committee was established on 15 March 1954, which was headed by Pham Van Dong.

Land reform then expanded to larger areas by five waves (see the table below).

| Phases | Periods | Number of communes covered | Locations |
|---|---|---|---|
| Phase 1 | 25 May 1954 – 20 September 1954 | 53 | Thai Nguyen: 47 communes Thanh Hoa: 6 communes |
| Phase 2 | 23 October 1954 – 15 January 1955 | 210 | Thai Nguyen: 22 communes Phu Tho: 100 communes Bac Giang: 22 communes Thanh Hoa: 66 communes |
| Phase 3 | 18 February 1955 – 20 June 1955 | 466 | Phu Tho: 106 communes Bac Giang: 100 communes Vinh Phuc: 65 communes Son Tay: 22 communes Thanh Hoa: 115 communes Nghe An: 74 communes |
| Phase 4 | 27 June 1955 – 31 December 1955 | 859 | Phu Tho: 17 communes Bac Giang: 16 communes Vinh Phuc: 111 communes Bac Ninh: 60 communes Son Tay: 71 communes Ha Nam: 98 communes Ninh Binh: 47 communes Thanh Hoa: 207 communes Nghe An: 5 communes Ha Tinh: 227 communes |
| Phase 5 | 25 December 1955 – 30 July 1956 | 1657 | Bac Ninh: 86 communes Ninh Binh: 45 communes Ha Dong: 163 communes Nam Dinh: 171 communes Thanh Hoa: 19 communes Nghe An: 250 communes Ha Tinh: 6 communes Quang Binh: 118 communes Vinh Linh: 21 communes Hai Duong: 217 communes Hung Yen: 149 communes Thai Binh: 249 communes Kien An: 85 communes Ha Noi: 47 communes Hai Phong: 9 communes Hong Quang: 40 communes |

Compared to the prior campaign, land reform campaign proper was carried out more violently and in larger areas especially after the Geneva Conference because the VWP leaders realized that the Geneva Agreement was impossible to be implemented; and feared that Diem's "March North" may start a fire at its backyard. Five times the number of landlords than the first campaign was fixed by the party, thus it provoked increased internal conflict. According to Hoang, the DRV authorities never stated the number of dispossessed landlords in any of their official publications. Expropriation was occasional during the first campaign but it was universally practiced during the second. As soon as the confiscation ceremony was over, an exhibition of the confiscated personal belongings of the landlord was organized, and in doing so, class awareness was intentionally provoked by illustrating the sharp contrast in living standards between peasants and landlords. However, this is not the end, the next big question was the apportionment of land and other properties. Normal practice should distribute them among peasants, however, it lacked accurate information.

== Chinese involvement ==
Due to the traditionally close connection between China and Vietnam in general, and the enormous tie between Chinese and Vietnamese communists since 1949 in particular, right from the early 1950s onward, communist China's influence over the DRV increased dramatically. There were three kinds of Chinese advisory groups in North Vietnam providing assistance in the aspect of military, politics and logistics. The Chinese military advisory group was headed firstly by Wei Guoqing (July 1950 – May 1951), providing directly consultation to the top commander of DRV. The Chinese political advisory group was headed by Luo Guibo. Land reform was part of political issues, and Luo played a big role in it. Under the political advisory group, a financial team was established in early 1951 to help North Vietnam formulate regulations on how to collect tax and rice.

Since 1953, for facilitating mass mobilization and rent reduction campaign, more than 100 North Vietnamese cadres were sent to China to participate in training classes. Later on in spring 1953, a particular institution exclusively in charge of helping DRV to conduct land reform was called the Land Reform and Party Consolidation Section which was headed by Zhang Dequn. According to his memoir, more land reform specialists of Chinese cadres was responsible for training. Similar to Chinese experience, social organizations such as peasant, youth, and women's league were established. Cadres were trained to practice a Vietnamese version of the Chinese "three together system" (三共, san gong) while peasants were mobilized and encouraged to "pour out grievances suffering from landlords and French collaborators" (诉苦, su ku).

For the case of North Vietnam, some soldiers were also affected due to their family background, and among the army, there was some degree of dissatisfaction. Considering this and from Chinese experience, Chinese advisors proposed to carry out a land reform education campaign among the DRV's army. In February 1953, Luo Guibo sent a report to the Chinese leadership proposing a political consolidation campaign (整军, zheng jun) to make them aware of class distinctions. In December 1953, the third National Congress passed a land reform law which put forward a route of land reform: step by step wipe out the feudal system by relying on poor peasants, uniting middle and rich peasants.

The Chinese pattern of land reform in the DRV was successful in meeting the need of the poor peasants for land and thus increased the prestige of the new Communist authorities. However, it also produced significant negative consequences for the party due to that Mao's pattern of land reform emphasized the excessive class struggle and repression. This was an important reason for later Vietnamese criticism of the Chinese model.

== Repression ==
Executions and imprisonment of persons classified as "reactionary and evil landlords" were contemplated from the beginning of the land reform program. A Politburo document dated 4 May 1953 said that executions were "fixed in principle at the ratio of one per one thousand people of the total population." That ratio would indicate that communist Vietnam contemplated the execution of about 15,000 "reactionary and evil landlords" in carrying out the program. On July 9, 1953, the first landlord executed was Nguyễn Thị Năm, who had in fact been an active supporter of the Vietnamese Communist resistance.

The scale of the ensuing repression has proved difficult and controversial to quantify, with estimates of the number of executions ranging from 800 to 200,000. Testimony from North Vietnamese witnesses suggested a ratio of one execution for every 160 village residents, which extrapolated nationwide would indicate nearly 100,000 executions. Because the campaign was concentrated mainly in the Red River Delta area, a lower estimate of 50,000 executions became widely accepted by scholars at the time. A Saigon communique put the figure at 32,000 executions (12,000 party members and 20,000 others), based on the testimony of an ex-party member involved in the campaign.

Higher estimates from the time often originated from Hoang Van Chi, whose book From Colonialism to Communism was often relied on as a primary source, particularly in secondary sources which viewed the land reform as a murderous campaign. Hoang's accounts were deemed as unreliable by Gareth Porter, who argued that Hoang misrepresented his background while falsifying or manipulating evidence to present an image of "bloodbath", which was then used in Saigon's propaganda campaigns. In 1973 Porter estimated 800–2,500 executions based on available official documentation, also cites a South Vietnamese government document released in 1959 which he says is consistent with an estimate of around 1,500 executions.

In 1990, economist Vo Nhan Tri reported uncovering a document in the central party archives which put the number of wrongful executions at 15,000. Scholar Edwin E. Moïse estimated the total number of executions at between 3,000 and 15,000 and later came up with a more precise figure of 13,500. According to Vu Tuong (2007), declassified documents from the Vietnamese and Hungarian archives indicate that the number of executions was much lower than reported at the time, although likely greater than 13,500 if taking into account the suicides following arrest and torture.

In 2007, Scholar Balasz Szalontai wrote that declassified documents of Hungarian diplomats living in North Vietnam at the time of the land reform provided a number of 1,337 executions and 23,748 imprisonments.

According to the Vietnam Institute for Economics, 172,008 individuals were designated as landlords and rich peasants, of whom 71.66% were mistakenly categorized. Although it is impossible to know how many of them were executed, this suggests that the scale of errors committed "was undeniably dramatic."

== "Rectification of errors" ==
As soon as the reform was completed by 1956 and the peasants' authority well-established in the villages, the party admitted to having made many serious mistakes during the reform when the "masses" had been "given a free hand". VWP developed a campaign called "Rectification of Errors" from January 1957 to mid-1957. This campaign was divided into three phases. The first phase was a crash operation to survey the damage done and release from prison incorrectly classified peasants and falsely accused cadres. The second phase, more deliberate and the real heart of the campaign, was divided into two steps. Step I was the re-classification of peasants, and step II was the restitution of property erroneously expropriated, or else providing suitable compensation. The third phase of the mistakes correction was to be a review, inventory and concentrated re-indoctrination of local personnel.

== Significance ==
As one of the most important events of the DRV in the 1950s, as well as the first radical political campaigns of the Vietnamese communists as an exclusive power-holder, this program had proven highly controversial in North Vietnamese society and the government itself, straining relations between peasants and the DRV.

The reform also reached very considerable ends in terms of economic and social transformation. Economically speaking, collective ownership prevailed and the rural population was more or less equal. From the perspective of social transformation, it radically changed the traditional pattern of village: formerly, the landlords played a leading role in the village affairs but now they were eliminated and replaced by peasants. Before and during the land reform campaign, particularly following the 1954 Geneva Conference with Operation Passage to Freedom and concurrent French efforts, nearly one million North Vietnamese moved to the South, with some 150,000 South Vietnamese relocating to the North.

Because of the use of violence and excessive emphasis over class struggle, land reform in the 1950s caused much negative impact. For this reason, it is still a sensitive topic even today. It also constitutes a considerable part of overseas Vietnamese political dissents criticizing today's communist party of Vietnam and its dependence on China.

The aims of the reform were military, economic, political and social, the most important of which, until the decisive victory at Dien Bien Phu in May 1954, was the military objective. Ho Chi Minh once listed in 1956 achievements of land reform, nearly ten million peasants had received land; tens of thousands of new cadres had been trained in the countryside. The organization of the Party, the administration and peasants' associations in the communes have been readjusted.

The Viet Minh regime gained control over rural villages and its ability to influence and mobilize the population was consolidated. Land reform is an agrarian project but also a political campaign. Through mass mobilization and classification, anti-revolutionary and reactionary enemies were suppressed economically and politically.

This had a profound impact on wars in the latter years, paving the way for socialist construction in the North, which could provide southern communists with logistical support. Further, the reform can be regarded as a preparatory step for a large-scale war. The regime opened the door to enlightenment by completely altering the existing patterns of production; but also provided the masses with an ideology which would modify their attitude to work even before the economic conditions were fundamentally changed.

== See also ==
- Land reform in Vietnam
- Land reform in South Vietnam
- Mass killings under communist states
