= Nhân Văn–Giai Phẩm affair =

Late-1950s North Vietnamese cultural-political movement

The Nhân văn – Giai phẩm (Vietnamese: Phong trào Nhân văn – Giai phẩm) was a cultural and political movement in North Vietnam from 1955 to early 1957. Two periodicals were established during that time, Nhân văn (Vietnamese: [ɲən van], Humanities) and Giai phẩm (Vietnamese: [zaːj fə᷉m], Masterpieces), many issues of which were published demanding freedom of speech, creativity and human rights. Following a loosening of political restrictions with some similarities to the Chinese Hundred Flowers Campaign, there was a hardening of attitudes. After those two major journals were closed down, their associates were imprisoned or reeducated. Authors affiliated with the Nhân văn–Giai phẩm movement were condemned by the government as "reactionary".

== Historical Contexts ==
=== 1954 Geneva Accords ===
The 1954 Geneva Accords marked the end of anti-French struggle and provided the Viet Minh with prestige and authority in Northern half of Vietnam. After the close of the Geneva Conference, the Vietnamese Workers' Party (VWP) faced two fundamental tasks: to reconstruct the north and to unify the south. To rebuild the north, the VWP leadership continued to look to China for assistance and China immediately began to offer aid to help the DRV. But the reconstruction efforts in the DRV following the First Indochina War underwent many trials and tribulations. The 1954 Geneva Accords on Nhan Van-Giai Pham facilitated enormous emigration from the north to the south from July 1954 to May 1955.

=== The Rise of de-Stalinization ===
The key global preludes of Nhan Van-Giai Pham affair may be located in the ups and downs of reform and repression that dominated political life in the Eastern Bloc and China throughout the turbulent years of the 1950s. Most significant was the death of Joseph Stalin in 1953, the rise of currents of de-Stalinization promoted by political elites, and the growth of agitation throughout the Eastern bloc on the part of workers, intellectuals, and students. This course was the so-called Liberalization, which accelerated in the wake of Nikita Khrushchev's Secret Speech denouncing the crimes of Stalin in Feb 1956. The uprisings in Eastern bloc later that year brought this era of high de-Stalinization which inspired and stimulated not only the Soviet bloc, but many intellectuals within Chinese and North Vietnamese state-party.

=== Impact of the imitation from Chinese models ===
During the Cold War, the Sino-Soviet relations and conflicts in ideology greatly complicated North Vietnam's reconstruction after the First indochina War and the path toward reunification. By the 1950s, Hanoi faced two different modes of revolution: peaceful reunification (peaceful coexistence) through socialist development of the North and violent reunification through a struggle for liberation in the South, due to the separate revolutionary ideology between Moscow and Beijing. For North Vietnam, the close connection, promoted by geographical, historical and cultural links with China, was much deeper than those with the Soviet Union. In this context, Vietnamese developments in the era of de-Stalinization had more connections with China than with the USSR. However, the Soviet Union continued to be considered by the Vietnamese communists as the ideological center of the world communist movement.

After the cancellation of prescribed 1956 nationwide election, both Beijing and Moscow encouraged Hanoi to continue its political and economic reconstruction within the North. While Chinese influence in the North Vietnamese political reforms should be considered in a totally different light. Three in particular political movements were causing widespread discontent in North Vietnam which were all resulted from DRV's imitation of the Chinese model, including the rectification campaign, the land reform and the correction of errors.

In 1950s, Ho Chi Minh made an official visit to China to sign a military aid agreement with the Chinese Communist Party (CCP) leadership in Beijing. With the introduction of Chinese military aid came the massive influx of Chinese-styled institutions, reforms and advisors. A massive organizational rectification campaign was launched to study the Chinese 1942 Yan'an campaign, and thousands of cadres were purged. Almost at the same time, a two-phase land reform campaign modeled on China's was also put into action from 1953 to 1956. This alarmed many intellectuals because most had ties to the landlord classes more or less. Since many intellectuals were labeled "class enemies", a new label of "progressive personalities" was created for them if they voluntarily surrendered all their property to the state, in addition to serving the revolution. The twin notorious movements of the rectification campaign and the land reform cause serious damage not only on old structures in the village but on the party apparatus, which might have sowed chaos.

In August 1956, the party admitted serious problems with the land reform, and it launched a period of "rectification of errors" in October the same year. Nevertheless, official acknowledgement of land reform errors could not prevent, or perhaps generated further discord in the countryside, such as a violent peasant rebellion in Nghe An province in November 1956. Although the chaos occurred in the countryside, the whole country was in disorder. Many urban intellectuals who had been mobilized by the party to participate in the campaigns stoked the atmosphere of dissent in North Vietnam. Moreover, the fact that those series of movements were inspired by Maoist that stimulated other unpopular policies of the new regime that contributed to a belief that the Vietnamese revolution was a misplaced enthusiasm for the Chinese model.

=== Hundred Flowers Movement in China ===
Both China and North Vietnam were influenced by the currents of de-Stalinization during that time, while the North Vietnamese case suggests a more direct influence from China. With the criticism of de-Stalinization by Mao Zedong, the Chinese Communist Party (CCP) pursued a high key official campaign against independent intellectuals such as Hu Feng in 1955. But, in a stunning reversal, it launched the famous liberal Hundred Flowers movement the following year with the eulogizing of Mao Zedong himself. Following a year during which intellectuals were encouraged to air in public grievances about the party and its policies, the CCP abruptly reversed course again. In 1957, it shut down the Hundred Flowers movement and launched an "anti-rightist campaign" designed to root out and punish intellectuals who had exposed themselves during the previous year.

Same way in North Vietnam, a Vietnamese intellectual Tran Dan was inspired and encouraged by Hu Feng and published Nhan Van magazine in 1955. Then the party was aware of the close connection between Tran Dan and Hu Feng, and it should not be a surprise that when Tran Dan was purged and arrested in February 1956, six months after Hu Feng was imprisoned, the rationale for some cadres involved in the arrest was "China has Hu Feng, perhaps we also have a Hu Feng." Tran Dan's arrest marked the start of Nhan Van Giai Pham affair.

== Nhân Văn and Giai phẩm Journals ==
=== Nhân Văn journal, 1955-1956 ===
The official address of the Nhân Văn ("humanities") paper was 27 Hang Khay, Hanoi. Its editor was Phan Khôi, and its secretary was Tran Duy. The Nhân Văn group consisted of the dissident North Vietnamese intellectuals from 1955–58. This group was led by Phan Khôi, a revolutionary from Quảng Nam. Most of these intellectuals had participated in the movement against French colonialism. After the first phase of land reform, they became disillusioned and started a political movement demanding political freedom and democracy.

=== Giai phẩm Mùa xuân journal, 1956 ===
The first edition of Giai Pham Mùa xuân ("Works of Spring"), also edited by Phan Khôi, was published in March, 1956. By December 1956, they had published two issues (Fall and Spring) of Giai Phẩm and five issues of Nhân Văn.

Among intellectuals that joined the group around the two journals were the lawyer Nguyễn Mạnh Tường, Dr Đặng Văn Ngữ, scholar Đào Duy Anh, philosopher Trần Đức Thảo, poets Trần Dần, Hoàng Cầm, Phùng Quán, Quang Dũng, Văn Cao, Nguyễn Hữu Đang, Lê Đạt and painter Bùi Xuân Phái.

== Events of the Nhân Văn-Giai phẩm Period ==
=== Prelude (late 1954-1955) ===
Prior to the founding of Nhân Văn and Giai Phẩm journals, there was an insurgent campaign waged within the army to loosen censorship imposed on military writers and artists.

In February 1955, about thirty writers and artists in the army drafted a resolution to the party's central committee "demanding the abolition of the General Political Bureau`s leadership over arts and letters in the army.", which included three demands: "1) hand over the leadership of arts and letters to the artists and writers; 2) establish an arts and letters association within the structure of army organization; 3) abolish the existing military regime insofar as it affects the artists and writers serving in the armed forces." In the same month, they proposed a political petition based on the above three requests, but the petition was rejected.

The leading figure of this dissenting intellectual campaign was Tran Dan, a soldier-poet who became disenchanted with Maoist cultural policy following a two-month study tour to China in late 1954. as we can see that, however, Tran Dan was in China at the height of the Hu Feng crisis.

Hu Feng, a literary critic and longtime member of the Chinese Communist Party, sent a letter to the central committee in July 1954 that criticized his grievances on the party's literary authority figures. Although he had no intention of challenging party authority, Hu Feng's action reflected a wide range of intellectuals and artists` grievances and was taken as evidence of the earliest cleavage between the party and intellectuals after the formation of the PRC. Hu Feng was arrested in July 1955, and the campaign against him broadened into a campaign to reeducate the masses and reinforce the official line. After Hu Feng's personal letters were published, there is no doubt that Tran Dan was exposed to the materials related to Hu Feng's letter, and later his friends acknowledged the connection between Hu Feng and Tran Dan in a cartoon published in Nhan Van, the most influential Vietnamese dissident magazine. As a result, Tran Dan was also arrested in February 1956, six month later than Hu Feng's imprisoned.

The failure of Tran Dan-led insurgent campaign significantly frustrated the intellectuals who naively believed that their contribution to the revolution had won the party's trust, and thus prepared the ground for the intellectuals` more radical challenge to the party the following year.

=== The golden age of Nhan Van-Giai Pham (Feb.1956-Nov.1956) ===
The second stage of Nhan Van-Giai Pham was most liberal from the appearance of the first issue of Giai Pham in February 1956, although shortly after Tran Dan was arrested, and until late November 1956. In particular from August to November 1956, the movement experienced its golden age. The coincidence of the publication of the first issue of Giai Pham and Khrushchev's Secret Speech raised the prospect that a period of liberalization was forthcoming. Indeed, the international circumstances had turned favorable to the intellectuals during this stage. Both the Twentieth Congress and the Chinese Double-Hundred policy had immediate impact upon the relationship between Vietnamese intellectuals and the party. and allowed Vietnamese intellectuals the space to vigorously voice their concerns. The Soviet first deputy premier went to Beijing and Hanoi in April 1956 in order to introduce the new Soviet line. In the same month Tran Dan was released from prison, mainly because of the change in international atmosphere.

Domestically, a similarly liberal atmosphere dominated the Tenth Plenum of the VWP in September during which party leaders "correction of errors" of the land reform and called for a revival of "democratic rights" and the "people`s freedom." after that, many issues of Nhan Van and Giai Pham appeared, along with other independent journals came out intermittently, including Tram hoa (Hundred flowers), Noi that (Speak truth), Tap san phe binh (Criticism newsletter), Sang tao (Creativity), and Dai moi (New land).

At the August 1956 Conference of the Vietnamese Literary Association, intellectuals openly demanded greater freedom, just as their counterparts in China and the Soviet Union were doing at that time. In September, five issues of the independent journal Nhan Van were permitted to publish, along with many other private publications that rallied dissenting intellectuals and flooded news-stands, symbolized a unique time of liberalization was represented. In an attempt to influence these publishing ventures and to stop the wave of criticism, the Van Nghe, which was an official weekly newspaper for literature and the arts, published a "self-criticism" of Hoai Thanh. Nevertheless, in that period, the DRV held a provisional tolerate official stance toward the directness of the writers and artists.

=== Incomplete repression (Nov.1956-early 1957) ===
After the Soviet suppression of the Hungarian revolt in early November 1956 and the outbreak of rural riot in Quynh Luu, the liberal stage of Nhan Van-Giai Pham ended. Instead, the Viet Minh began to strike back against the intellectuals by publishing editorials and commentaries and even "letters from audiences" to condemn anti-socialist elements. In the meanwhile, government began to harass the editors of Nhan Van-Giai Pham by accusing them of breaking the law for failing to deposit three copies of the journal with the Central Press Office prior to publication.

A more aggressive campaign against Nhan Van-Giai Pham was launched after the sixth issue of Nhan Van was seized. The campaign featured the contemporary publications to denunciate the movement. The entry from Cuu quoc reflected the high degree of belligerence of the campaign:

Nhan Van distorted the truth, exaggerated facts, made up stories, sowed doubts and pessimism in our regime, our party and our government, and created an atmosphere of mistrust and division within our ranks: between soldiers and the army, between the people and the authorities, between the members and non-members of the party, and even between leaders and the masses.

At the same time, the campaign also labeled the Nhan Van Giai Pham as "reactionary" political agenda. After more than a month of such campaign, on 18 December, the Hanoi Administrative Committee suspended the two journals of Nhan Van and Giai Pham, closed other publishing houses and confiscated the copies of previous issues. But the storm of political condemnation toward Nhan Van-Giai Pham quickly passed away by the early 1957. For the reasons that remain vague (which possibly related to the ongoing Hundred Flowers campaign in China), the party-state stopped its anti-Nhan Van Giai Pham campaign, and no one arrested or fired among all those targeted in this campaign.

=== The second liberal period (Feb.1957-Dec.1957) ===
Same as the second stage of the movement following the Tran Dan's case, this new stage was characterized by a mixture of official moderate repression and tolerance toward the leaders of Nhan Van-Giai Pham and their ongoing activities within the public domain. In May, a new literary weekly, Van ("literature") appeared as the organ of the newly formed Writers` Association. Under the banner of Van the authors for Nhan Van and Giai Pham quickly rallied. Influenced by the end of the Hundred Flowers movement and the onset of the anti-rightist campaign in China during July 1957 in some way, Van, was harshly criticized in an article in Hoc Tap ("studies"), but such criticism never led to an orchestrated press campaign or forced the writers to be silent. In short, the cultural atmosphere in North Vietnam for most of 1957 was mild and tolerant at least.

=== The end of Nhan Van-Giai Pham (Jan.1958) ===
This above resumed liberalization lasted for almost one year and was finally ended in early 1958. On 6 January 1958 the politburo of the party issued the "Politburo Resolution on Literary Affairs," demanding the expulsion of all "subversive elements" from literary organizations and requiring the education of intellectuals with Marxism–Leninism and physical labor. This resolution was followed by suspension of the publication of Van indefinitely and assigned artists and cultural cadres to a three-stage "struggle class" that involved re-education, ideological struggle, and hard labor. A re-education course was organized for nearly 500 writers and artists in January 1958, and from March to April 1958 the LDP Central Committee's Subcommittee for Arts and Letters organized a "study session" for some 304 writers, poets, and other cultural cadres, each of whom was forced to make a "self-criticism."

In the end, four dissenters were expelled from the Union of Arts and Literature and others, such as poets Tran Dan and Le Dat, were suspended. And 300 of the 476 people reeducated in the same year were writers and artists.

== Arrests ==
On October 21–23, 1956, a delegation composed of 40 writers and artists discussed the questions of intellectual freedom with such prominent party cadres as Trường Chinh, Xuân Thủy, and Tố Hữu. Of the intellectuals present, the young poet Lê Đạt expressed particularly sharp criticism of the regime's intolerant cultural policies in general, and of To Huu and Hoai Thanh in particular. Among others, he condemned the imprisonment of the poet Trần Dần, and the harassment to which Văn Cao, a famous poet and composer, had been subjected. On the second day, it was the artists' turn to speak. On the third day, Truong Chinh declared that the intellectuals' complaints were justified, but he instructed the participants not to publish anything about the debate in the press. The Hungarian revolution of October 23 (and particularly the Soviet invasion of November 4) put an end to North Vietnam's short-lived intellectual "thaw". The editors of Nhan Van intended to publish a special issue about the Hungarian events, whereupon the authorities banned the paper, and adopted a tougher attitude toward intellectual dissidence.

On December 15, 1956, the Communist Party, having hesitated for two years, finally shut down the organization, closed the office, and arrested key participants. Some were imprisoned and others sent to re-education camp (Vietnamese: trại học tập cải tạo) and others made to undertake self-criticism. The event was publicised by Trăm Hoa Đua Nở Trên Đất Bắc (Hundreds of Flowers Blooming in the North), published in 1959 by the Congress of Cultural Freedom in Saigon, and in the West by Hoàng Văn Chí in The New Class in North Vietnam (Saigon, 1964).

== Rehabilitation ==
After the start of Doi Moi reforms in the late 1980s, many of the imprisoned intellectuals were rehabilitated. The government of the Socialist Republic of Vietnam recognized and bestowed many of those writers and poets in the late 1990s and 2000s (decade) with many state awards, often posthumously.

== Significance ==
Nhan Van-Giai Pham affair was seems like an interlude of North Vietnamese political history, which did not last so long, but its legacy still impact on current Vietnamese society. It was the first and most formative event in political dissidence under the VCP's rule, and the issues raised by dissidents in the 1950s remain unchanged. First, Nhan Van Giai Pham is a reference point for those who want political reform, the restoration of intra-party democratization, and greater intellectual freedom. Secondly, although Nhan Van Giai Pham is still sensitive to present Hanoi, it could not be neglect because it continues as a rallying point for those who demand the party reopen the matter and rehabilitate the victims. Third, this affair also can be a bridge for the new generation of artists and intellectuals to link to their predecessors` past. Finally, how the regime responds to this event, even today, tells much about the state of political reform in Vietnam.

== Different Interpretations ==
=== Orthodox point of view ===
From the orthodox point of view, Zachary Abuza (2001) considered that the intellectuals in Nhan Van Giai Pham were a group of dissidents who were joined the Viet Minh out of patriotism, not a love or supporter of communism. Indeed, a South Vietnamese scholar argued that the intellectuals were "encouraged by the hope that they might use the resistance organization to assemble nationalist elements and to create a force which would actually tip the scales against the communists within the ranks of the resistance." Therefore, the dissent was originated from two disparate ideologies between the intellectuals and Viet Minh.

Another feature of Nhan Van Giai Pham from the orthodox interpretation is its close connection with China. Abuza (2001) stated that both the rectification campaign and the land reform campaign modeled on China, and Chinese logistical support was very necessary to Viet Minh during the 1950s. Yinghong Cheng (2004) insists that Nhan Van-Giai Pham`s connection with China was more obviously than with the Eastern Europe. It was looked upon China as its inspiration and paragon, and it went through a saddlelike course which at some points corresponded to the circumstances in China.

=== Revisionist point of view ===
Different from the orthodox viewpoint which characterizes Nhan Van Giai Pham as a "dissident" movement, the revisionist viewpoint suggests that the standard view of Nhan Van-Giai Pham fails to appreciate the "reform Communist" character of its agenda. Moreover, when examined within a broader transnational context—one marked by the emergence of loosely connected reformist movements throughout the Communist world in the 1950s inspired by de-Stalinization--Nhan Van Giai Pham comes off as a relatively restrained effort to "save" Vietnamese Communism by transforming it from within.

Peter Zinoman (2001) insisted that the intellectuals were all from late colonial era, during the 1950s, some disenchanted intellectuals abandoned Viet Minh and others for the sake of higher career positions in cultural bureaucracy of DRV chose to become "true believers" to Maoism. Between the rejectionists and the true believers was a much larger group of Viet Minh intellectuals who came to express their disappointment during Nhan Van Giai Pham period.

On the other hand, this affair has been highly related to global currents of reform communism after the death of Stalin from mid-1950 by the revisionist historians. Affinities and congruences between Nhan Van Giai Pham and Eastern bloc reform Communism may be found in shared patterns of official language and argumentation as well as in a common repertoire of political positions and cultural references. In addition, Nhan Van Giai Pham`s kinship with a moderate version of reform Communism is evident in its leaders` insistent expression of fidelity to the VWP and Marxism–Leninism.

=== Other interpretations ===
Lien-Hang T. Nguyen (2006) stated that neither totally imitated to Chinese models, nor had affinity with Eastern bloc, Viet Minh was actually intertwined with the deterioration of Sino-Soviet relations during the 1950s. The North Vietnamese intended to maintain a neutral position under the influences from both China and Soviet Union because it could not afford to alienate either Moscow or Beijing. Nevertheless, since the Vietnamese communists were geographically, culturally and historically closer to the Chinese Communist Party, and since Moscow demonstrated further inclination to avoid a confrontation with the United States after 1954 Geneva Accords, the voices within the VWP calling for a Vietnamese move closer to Beijing in its ideological orientation.

Therefore, according to this interpretation, although Nhan Van Giai Pham affair was shaped by the current of de-Stalinization and the Hundred Flowers Movement from eastern bloc and China during the 1950s, it still tried to find an independent way to deal with such political struggles.

== See also ==
- Vietnam War
- De-Stalinization
- Hundred Flowers Movement
- 1954 Geneva Conference

== Bibliography ==
1. Zachary Abuza, Renovating Politics in Contemporary Vietnam, Lynne Rienner Publishers,2011
2. Kim N.B. Ninh, A World Transformed: the Politics of Culture in Revolutionary Vietnam,1945-1965, Then University of Michigan Press, 2002
3. Qiang Zhai, China and the Vietnam Wars,1950-1975, The University of North Carolina Press, 2000
