= Vũ Ngọc Phan =

Vietnamese writer and literary critic

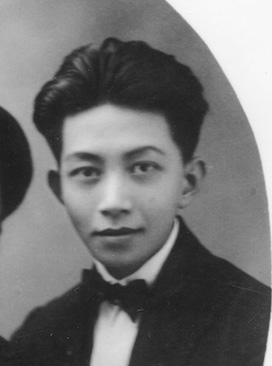
Vũ Ngọc Phan

Vũ Ngọc Phan (武玉璠, 8 September 1902 in Bac Ninh – 1987) was a Vietnamese writer and literary critic. His wife was the poet Hằng Phương and their daughter was the painter Vũ Giáng Hương.

He studied French literature in Hanoi, then in France. In his literary criticism he preferred writers from the end of the 19th century to the Second World War. His criticism was published in five volumes up to 1942.
