= 2010 in Vietnam =

- Decades: 1990s; 2000s; 2010s; 2020s
- See also: Other events of 2010; History of Vietnam; Timeline of Vietnamese history; List of years in Vietnam

The following are events that happened during 2010 in Vietnam.

== Incumbents ==
- Party General Secretary: Nông Đức Mạnh
- President: Nguyễn Minh Triết
- Prime Minister: Nguyễn Tấn Dũng
- Chairman of the National Assembly: Nguyễn Phú Trọng

== Events ==
- July 25 – Nguyễn Trường Tô was expelled from the Communist Party of Vietnam for having "unhealthy relationship" with a prostitute.
- August 4 – Phạm Thanh Bình was arrested because Vinashin owed 86 trillion đồng.
- August 19 – Ngô Bảo Châu won the Fields Medal, becoming the first Vietnamese to win this medal.
- October 1–10 – Millennial Anniversary of Hanoi.
- October – Dozens of people died from floods in 2010 Central Vietnam flood.
- October 17–21 – First Hanoi International Film Festival.
- October 30 – Fifth East Asia Summit was held in Hanoi, Vietnam.

== Deaths ==
- January 28 – Đàm Thị Loan, military personnel (b. 1926)
- March 18 – Hữu Loan, poet (b. 1916)
- May 6 – Hoàng Cầm, poet (b. 1922)
- August 20 – Đặng Phong, economic historian (b. 1937)
- September 27 – Lê Sáng, martial artist (b. 1920)
- October 17 – Emmanuel Lê Phong Thuận, bishop (b. 1930)
