= 2017 in Vietnam =

- Decades: 1990s; 2000s; 2010s; 2020s
- See also: Other events of 2017; History of Vietnam; Timeline of Vietnamese history; List of years in Vietnam

Events in the year 2017 in Vietnam.

== Incumbents ==
- Party General Secretary: Nguyễn Phú Trọng
- President: Trần Đại Quang
- Prime Minister: Nguyễn Xuân Phúc
- Assembly Chairperson: Nguyễn Thị Kim Ngân

== Events ==
- APEC Vietnam 2017, a year-long hosting of Asia-Pacific Economic Cooperation (APEC) meetings in Vietnam.

== Deaths ==
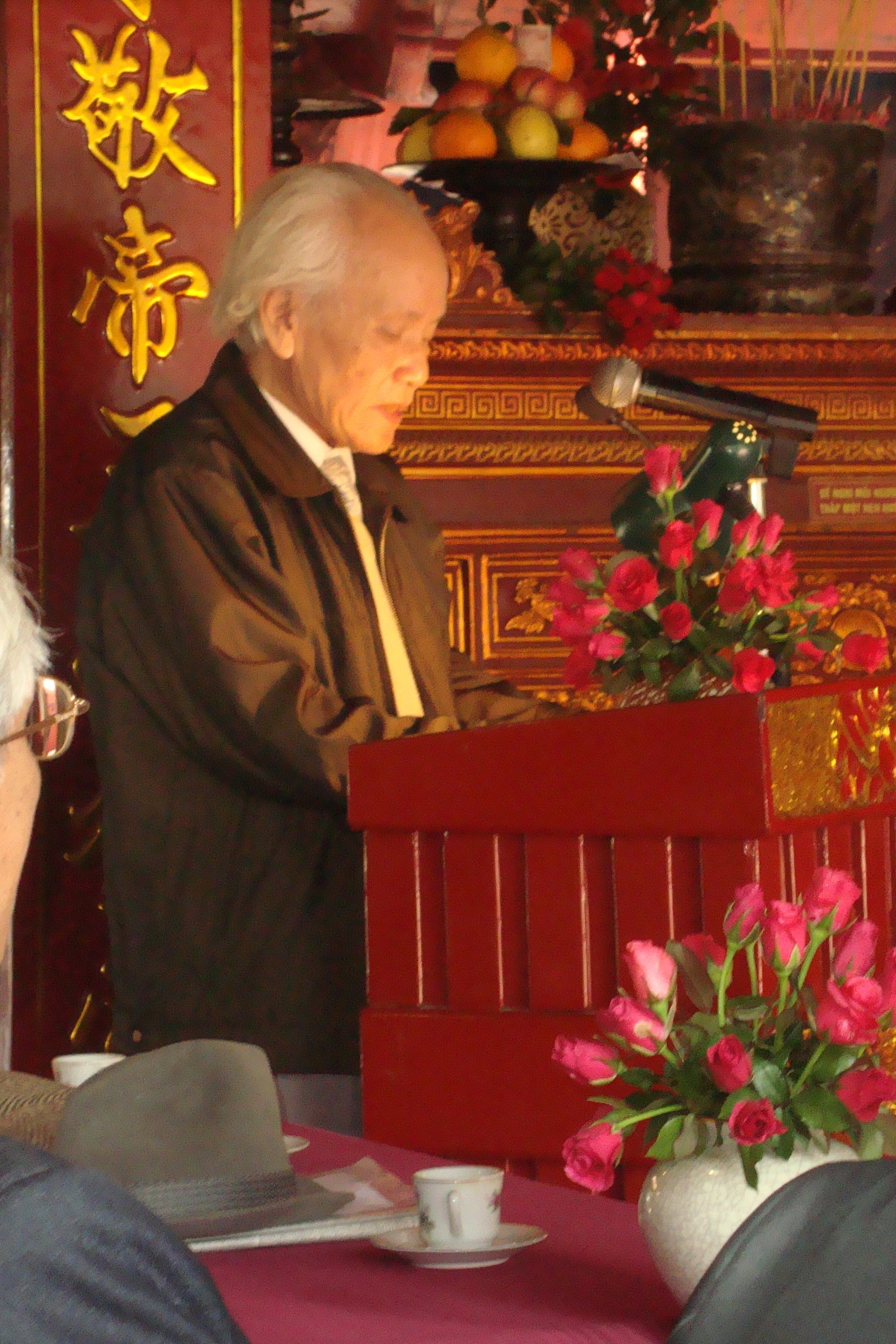
Đinh Xuân Lâm

- 10 January – Võ Quý, zoologist (b. 1929).
- 25 January – Đinh Xuân Lâm, educator and historian (b. 1925).
- 14 February – Paul Nguyên Van Hòa, Roman Catholic prelate, Bishop of Phan Thiết and Nha Trang (b. 1931).
- 23 August – Binh Pho, artist in wood (b. 1955).
- 5 October – François Xavier Nguyên Van Sang, Roman Catholic prelate, Bishop of Thái Bình (b. 1932).
