= 2011 in Vietnam =

- Decades: 1990s; 2000s; 2010s; 2020s
- See also: Other events of 2011; History of Vietnam; Timeline of Vietnamese history; List of years in Vietnam

The following are events that happened during 2011 in Vietnam.

== Incumbents ==
- Party General Secretary: Nông Đức Mạnh (until January 19), Nguyễn Phú Trọng (since January 19)
- President: Nguyễn Minh Triết (until July 25); Trương Tấn Sang (from July 25)
- Prime Minister: Nguyễn Tấn Dũng
- Chairman of the National Assembly: Nguyễn Phú Trọng (to July 23); Nguyễn Sinh Hùng (from July 23)

== Events ==
- January 12–19 – 11th National Congress of the Communist Party of Vietnam.
- January 19 – Journalist Lê Hoàng Hùng was burned.
- April–May – Thousands of Hmong people protested in Mường Nhé.
- May 22 – Legislative election was held.
- August 4 – Phạm Thanh Bình, CEO of Vinashin was arrested.
- August 24 – Lê Văn Luyện killed 3 people and robbed property at a gold shop.
- September 10–11 – National funeral of Võ Chí Công.
- November 20 – Saigon River Tunnel opened.
- December 23 – General Statistics Office announced that inflation rate reached 18.58%.

== Deaths ==
- February 24 – Trần Lâm, journalist, director of Voice of Vietnam (b. 1921)
- April 24 – Madame Nhu, politician (b. 1924)
- June 20 – Vương Văn Bắc, politician (b. 1927)
- July 15 – Đặng Văn Quang, officer (b. 1929)
- July 23 – Nguyễn Cao Kỳ, politician (b. 1930)
- September 8 – Võ Chí Công, Chairman of the Council of State of Vietnam (p. 1912)
- October 23 – Trương Vĩnh Lễ, politician (b. 1914)
- October 27 – Hoàng Hồng Cẩm, painter (b. 1959)
- November 17 – Alexis Phạm Văn Lộc, prelate (b. 1919)
