= 1917 in Vietnam =

- Decades: 1890s; 1900s; 1910s; 1920s; 1930s
- See also: Other events of 1917; History of Vietnam; Timeline of Vietnamese history; List of years in Vietnam

Events from the year 1917 in Vietnam

== Incumbents ==
- Monarch: Khải Định

== Births ==
- Chu Tử in the Sơn Tây Province
- Trương Đình Dzu in the Bình Định Province
- Tran Duc Thao in Bắc Ninh
- Nguyễn Thị Kim in Hanoi
- Nguyễn Tôn Hoàn in Tây Ninh
- Nguyễn Văn Tỵ in Hanoi
