= 1915 in Vietnam =

- Decades: 1890s; 1900s; 1910s; 1920s; 1930s
- See also: Other events of 1915; History of Vietnam; Timeline of Vietnamese history; List of years in Vietnam

Events from the year 1915 in Vietnam

== Incumbents ==
- Monarch: Duy Tân

== Events ==
- Construction of the Nguyễn Thị Minh Khai High School was completed.

== Births ==
- May 1 – Hoàng Văn Thái in Tiền Hải
- August 1 – Bà Tùng Long in Da Nang
- December 20 – Tú Duyên in Bát Tràng
- October – Nam Cao in the Hà Nam Province
- July 1 – Nguyễn Văn Linh
- September 20 – Nguyễn Văn Hinh in Mỹ Tho
