= The Legend of Mai An Tiêm =

Vietnamese folk tale

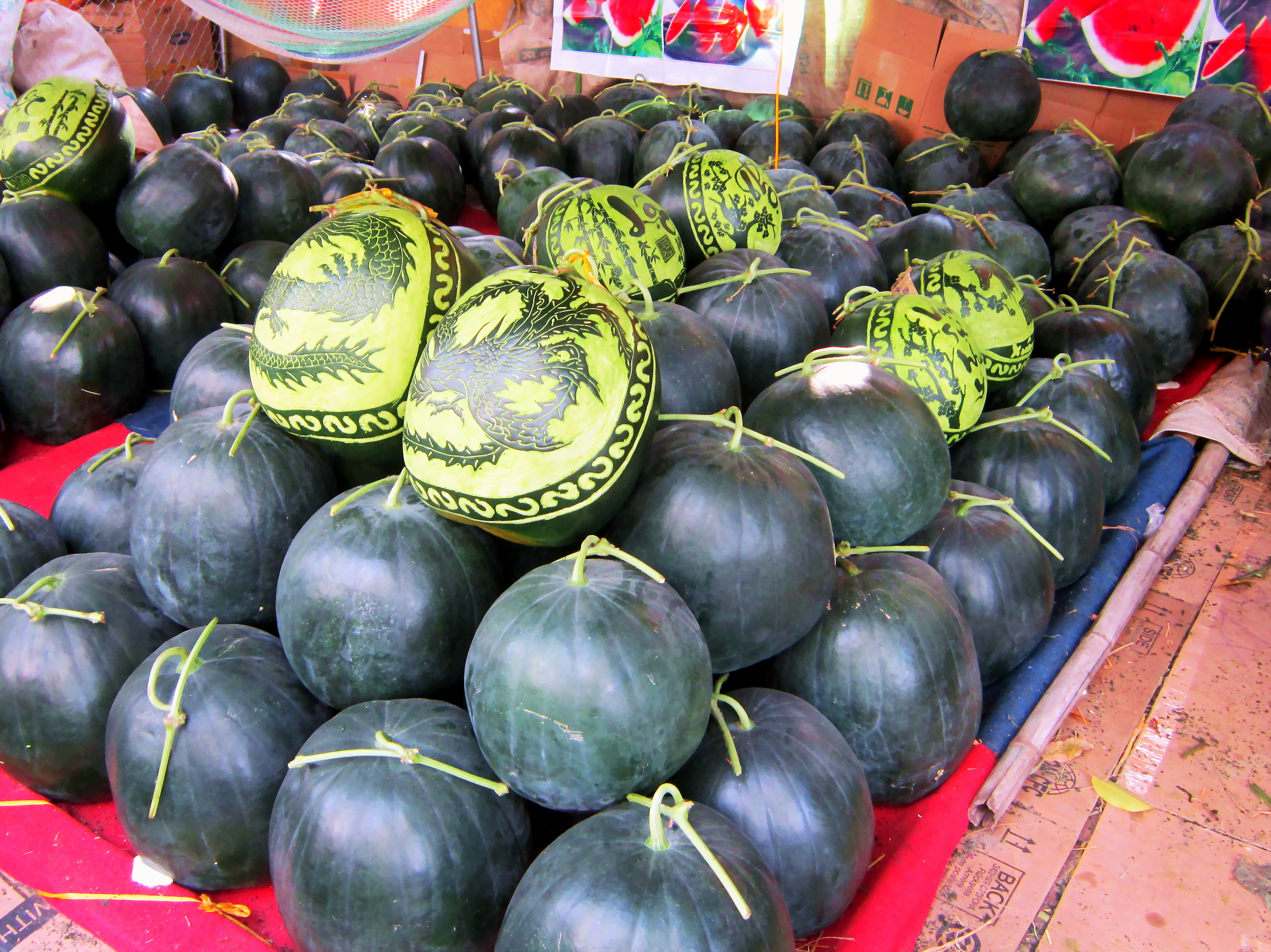
Watermelons are an iconic fruit in Vietnamese New Year

The Legend of Mai An Tiêm (Vietnamese: Truyền thuyết Mai An Tiêm) or the Origin Tale of Watermelons (Vietnamese: Sự tích quả dưa hấu) is a Vietnamese folktale and myth, first told in Lĩnh Nam chích quái. It narrates the life of Mai An Tiêm, a culture hero living in the Hùng king's era and his discovery of watermelons for the Vietnamese people.

== Story ==
The legend of Mai An Tiêm was the eight tale told in Lĩnh Nam chích quái, a semi-fictional collection written in the fourteenth century, under the title Tây Qua Truyện (chữ Hán: 西瓜傳; literally 'The Tale of the Western Fruit').

Mai Tiêm was an official in the Hùng King's era. He was originally a foreign slave bought from a merchant by the king when he was 7 or 8. Thanks to his virtuous appearance and intelligence, the king renamed him to Mai Yển, or An Tiêm, and granted him a wife, with whom he gave birth to a son and a daughter. The king loved him and gave him important positions, and he became wealthy over time. Tiêm got arrogant and often said "This [fortune] is by my previous self and not by the king's grace", which angered the king. The king banished his family to the estuary of Nga Sơn District, a remote uninhabited place surrounded only by sea and sand. When his wife lamented, Tiêm told her "Heaven has given birth to and risen us, our lives are in Heaven's hands, so we have nothing to worry about". He saw a white eared pheasant flew from the West and landed on a mountain, dropping some seeds in the sand, which grew into fruitful trees. An Tiêm celebrated and said "they are no oddity, but what Heaven has sent to help us". He cut open the fruit, which tasted sweet and refreshing, so he kept the seeds for the next year. He also exchanged the fruit for rice to feed his family. As the fruit's name is unknown, Tiem named it the Western fruit, as the seeds were carried by a pheasant from the West. Fishermen and tradesmen all loved the fruit. People from also nearby villages came to buy the seeds.

The king thought of Tiêm, so he sent a man to see if he was alive or not. The man reported back and the king lamented to himself "He said his [fortune] was by his previous self. That is no exaggeration." The king recalled Tiêm, restored his position and granted him more servants. The beach where Tiêm lived is called An Tiêm beach, and the village is called Mai village. Some people honor the place where An Tiêm's ancestors lived as An Tiêm district in Thanh Hóa.

More recent variants of the story have Mai An Tiêm exiled to a desert island, where he carved his name onto the watermelons and threw them into the sea to be picked up by fishermen. They also emphasize more on Tiêm's resourcefulness and less on his religious belief.

== Adaptions ==
The legend from Lĩnh Nam chích quái was novelized as Quả Dưa Đỏ (lit. 'The Red Melon') by Nguyễn Trọng Thuật and published Nam Phong Magazine in 1925, which was one of the first modern Vietnamese novels. The novel was also inspired by Robinson Crusoe.

In 2011, Tô Hoài wrote the novel Đảo Hoang (lit. 'The Desert Island') based on the legend.

The tale of watermelons is also one of Vietnamese fairy tales adapted by Cổ tích Việt Nam (lit. 'Vietnamese fairy tales'), a VHS series directed by Nguyễn Minh Chung. The episode was released in 1995, starring Quang Hải as Mai An Tiêm.

== Legacy ==
=== Adoration ===
A street in Nha Trang, Khánh Hòa is named after Mai An Tiêm.

=== Temple and Festival ===
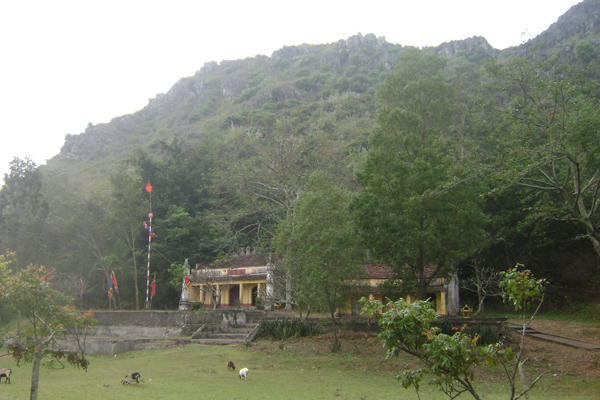
The temple of Mai An Tiêm in Thanh Hóa

The desert island where Mai An Tiem was banished to is believed to be in Nga Phú commune, Nga Sơn District in Thanh Hóa, now completely inland. In this commune, there is a temple of Mai An Tiêm, where an annual festival is held to commemorate him from March 12 to March 15 in the Vietnamese calendar. The temple is recognized as a provincial cultural and historical relic site by Thanh Hóa government.

=== Stamps ===
The tale of Mai An Tiêm is featured on a four-stamp set issued by Vietnam Post on June 1, 2021. The stamp set is designed by artist Tô Minh Trang, with professor Đoàn Thị Tình and the Institute of History as advisors.

== Interpretation ==
The main interpretation of the tale is that it upholds the value of hard work and labor, as well as the indomitable will and resourcefulness of local people.
