= 2012 in Vietnam =

- Decades: 1990s; 2000s; 2010s; 2020s
- See also: Other events of 2012; History of Vietnam; Timeline of Vietnamese history; List of years in Vietnam

The following are events that happened during 2012 in Vietnam.

== Incumbents ==
- Party General Secretary: Nguyễn Phú Trọng
- President: Trương Tấn Sang
- Prime Minister: Nguyễn Tấn Dũng
- Chairman of the National Assembly: Nguyễn Sinh Hùng

== Events ==
- January 5 – Haiphong police confiscated the land of Đoàn Văn Vươn's family.
- March 29 – Tran Thi Lieu was convicted of the murder of her husband Lê Hoàng Hùng and sentenced to life in prison.
- May 16 – Vinasat-2 was launched.
- July 21 – F-1 satellite was launched.
- August 3-5 – The first Vietpride event was held in Hanoi.
- October 22 – Nguyễn Tấn Dũng admitted mistakes in economic management.
- November 22 – Vietnam Coast Guard arrested 11 pirates who hijacked the MT Zafirah ship.
- December 20 – Sơn La Dam was completed.
- December 28 – Lê Quốc Quân was arrested for tax evasion.

== Deaths ==
- May 13 – Antoine Nguyễn Văn Thiện, bishop (b. 1906)
- June 21 – Nguyễn Trọng Xuyên, general officer (b. 1926)
- July 3 – Nguyễn Hữu Có, politician (b. 1925)
- October 2 – Nguyễn Chí Thiện, dissident (b.1939)
