= Ninh Viết Giao =

Vietnamese writer

Ninh Viết Giao (Thanh Hoá, c. 1930) is a Vietnamese writer. He graduated from Hanoi University in 1956. He was one of the writers reviving an interest in folk tales such as Thằng Bờm and Truyện Trê Cóc.

== Works ==
- Xứ Nghệ và tôi 2006
