= 2014 in Vietnam =

- Decades: 1990s; 2000s; 2010s; 2020s
- See also: Other events of 2014; History of Vietnam; Timeline of Vietnamese history; List of years in Vietnam

The following lists events that happened during 2014 in Vietnam.

== Incumbents ==
- Party General Secretary: Nguyễn Phú Trọng
- President: Trương Tấn Sang
- Prime Minister: Nguyễn Tấn Dũng
- Chairman of the National Assembly of Vietnam: Nguyễn Sinh Hùng

== Events ==
=== January ===
- January 10 – China imposes a "fishing permit" rule in the South China Sea, much to the chagrin of the United States, the Philippines, and Vietnam.
- January 28 – All tourism activities at Hoàng Liên National Park and to the Fansipan mountain in Lào Cai Province have been suspended until the end of March to reduce the risk of forest fires caused by cold weather and a lack of rain.

=== February ===
- February 8 – Ballroom dancers and aerobics classes have popped up in the midst of an anti-China protest in Hanoi, in an apparent ploy by the government to break up the event, McDonalds Opened in ho chi Minh city
- February 24 – At least seven mourners are killed and 37 are injured as a bridge collapses as they are transporting a coffin in Lai Châu Province.

=== March ===
- March 5 – Raging forest fires break out and sweep through Hoàng Liên National Park fueled by dry weather and strong winds, in Lào Cai.
- March 9 – The Ministry of Transport of Vietnam orders local airports and airlines to tighten their security, after Malaysia Airlines Flight 370 vanished, on the first level of a three-level security alert system.
- March 19 – Vietnam jails prominent blogger for 'anti-state activities'.

=== April ===
- April 7 – Lawyer Cù Huy Hà Vũ, one of Vietnam's most famous dissidents, is released early from prison. Afterwards, he travels to the United States.
- April 14 – Vietnam frees Nguyen Tien Trung and Vi Duc Hoi.
- April 18 – Seven people are killed in border clash between illegal Chinese migrants and Vietnamese security forces at Quảng Ninh province. Just hours later, Vietnamese security forces intercepted 21 illegal migrants at Móng Cái in Quảng Ninh province attempting to cross from China by sea.

=== December ===
- December 13 – Vietnam files an intervention in the arbitration case about the South China Sea with Vietnam rejecting China's claims.
- December 15 – An appellate court in Vietnam upholds a 30-year prison sentence and convictions for Nguyen Duc Kien, a former businessman.
- December 16 – A tunnel collapse traps twelve Vietnamese workers, including one woman, at a construction site of a hydropower plant located in the Central Highlands.
- December 19 – A Vietnam official states that twelve Vietnamese workers have been rescued three days after being trapped in a collapsed tunnel at a construction site of a hydropower plant located in Central Highlands.

== See also ==
- Years in Vietnam
