= 2015 in Vietnam =

- Decades: 1990s; 2000s; 2010s; 2020s
- See also: Other events of 2015; History of Vietnam; Timeline of Vietnamese history; List of years in Vietnam

The following lists events that happened during 2015 in Vietnam.

== Incumbents ==
- Party General Secretary: Nguyễn Phú Trọng
- President: Trương Tấn Sang
- Prime Minister: Nguyễn Tấn Dũng

== Events ==
=== January ===
- January 1 - Vietnam’s new marriage law goes into effect. Same-sex marriages are no longer prohibited, but are not recognized as being legally valid.
- January 3 - Bulk Jupiter, a Norwegian cargo ship, sinks off the coast of Vietnam, with eighteen dead and one survivor.

== See also ==
- Years in Vietnam
