= 2013 in Vietnam =

- Decades: 1990s; 2000s; 2010s; 2020s
- See also: Other events of 2013; History of Vietnam; Timeline of Vietnamese history; List of years in Vietnam

The following are events that happened during 2013 in Vietnam.

== Incumbents ==
- Party General Secretary: Nguyễn Phú Trọng
- President: Trương Tấn Sang
- Prime Minister: Nguyễn Tấn Dũng
- Chairman of the National Assembly: Nguyễn Sinh Hùng

== Events ==
- May 22 – 2013 Southern Vietnam and Cambodia blackout.
- August – Pride Month took place for the first time in Vietnam, one year after the first Pride event.
- December 27 – The Government issued Resolution No. 132/NQ-CP on separating Từ Liêm district to establish two new districts, Bắc Từ Liêm and Nam Từ Liêm.

== Deaths ==
- May 29 – Bùi Huy Đường, professor of the French Academy of Sciences (b. 1937)
- May 31 – Hồ Đức Việt, politician (b. 1947)
- October 4 – Võ Nguyên Giáp, Former Minister of Defence of Vietnam (b. 1911)
