= 1966 in Vietnam =

- Decades: 1940s; 1950s; 1960s; 1970s; 1980s
- See also: Other events of 1966; History of Vietnam; Timeline of Vietnamese history; List of years in Vietnam

The following lists events that happened during 1966 in Vietnam.

== Incumbents ==
- President: Hồ Chí Minh
- Prime Minister: Nguyễn Cao Kỳ (south)

== Events ==
- April 1 - General Pham Xuan Chieu, sent by Vietnam's prime minister Nguyễn Cao Kỳ to seek support for the Saigon junta from General Nguyen Chanh Thi, commander of I Corps, is ambushed by a group of anti-Ky students, who capture him and transport him around the city in a cycle rickshaw before releasing him.
- April 5 – Prime minister Nguyễn Cao Kỳ personally attempted to lead the capture of the restive city of Đà Nẵng before backing down.
- April 8 - Buddhists in South Vietnam protest against the fact that the new government has not set a date for free elections.
- April 9 - Buddhist Uprising: In Vietnam, Pro-Struggle Movement ARVN Colonel Dam Quang Yeu orders a convoy of infantry, tanks and artillery to proceed north from Hoi An to Da Nang. The Americans finally take action in the dispute when Major General Wood B. Kyle, commanding officer of the 3rd Marine Division, orders the 9th Regiment to block Route 1 and stop the convoy.
- April 14 - The South Vietnamese government promises free elections in 3–5 months.
- April 29 - The total number of U.S. troops in Vietnam reaches 250,000.
- May 15 - The South Vietnamese army besieges Da Nang.
- June 13 - Vietnam War: Operation Kansas - A thirteen-man reconnaissance team is landed by helicopter in the middle of the Que Son Valley on the small mountain of Nui Loc Son. In the next 24 hours, six more recon assets are deployed in different strategic sites, ringing the valley. This enabled the teams to report on enemy activity and forward observe for ordnance payload delivery. One team works its way south of Hiep Duc after they set up positions along the heavily wooded Hill 555. They spot several groups of NVA forces of varying size that appear to be training in the area.
- June 14 - Vietnam War: Operation Kansas - An enemy scout dog scents US Marines and the team's leader calls for an extraction. The team is safely flown back to Chu Lai by helicopter.
- June 15 - Vietnam War: Battle of Hill 488 - A small United States Marine Corps reconnaissance platoon inflicts large casualties on regular North Vietnamese Army and Viet Cong fighters before withdrawing with fourteen dead.
- June 16 - Vietnam War: The first phase of Operation Kansas ends.
- June 29 - Vietnam War: U.S. planes begin bombing Hanoi and Haiphong.
