= 2019 in Vietnam =

- Decades: 1990s; 2000s; 2010s; 2020s
- See also: Other events of 2019; History of Vietnam; Timeline of Vietnamese history; List of years in Vietnam

Events of the year 2019 in Vietnam.

== Incumbents ==
- Party General Secretary & President: Nguyễn Phú Trọng
- Prime Minister: Nguyễn Xuân Phúc
- Assembly Chairperson: Nguyễn Thị Kim Ngân

== Events ==
- 27–28 February – Vietnam holds the second summit meeting between the leaders of the United States and North Korea.
- 1 – 25 April 2019 – Vietnam conducted its fifth national census.

== Deaths ==
- 22 April – Lê Đức Anh, 4th President of Vietnam (b. 1920)
- 20 May – Nguyễn Quảng Tuân, Vietnamese writer and poet (b. 1925)
- 14 July – Hoàng Tụy, Vietnamese mathematician (b. 1927)
