= Hanoi University =

Language university in Vietnam

- Trường Đại học Hà Nội
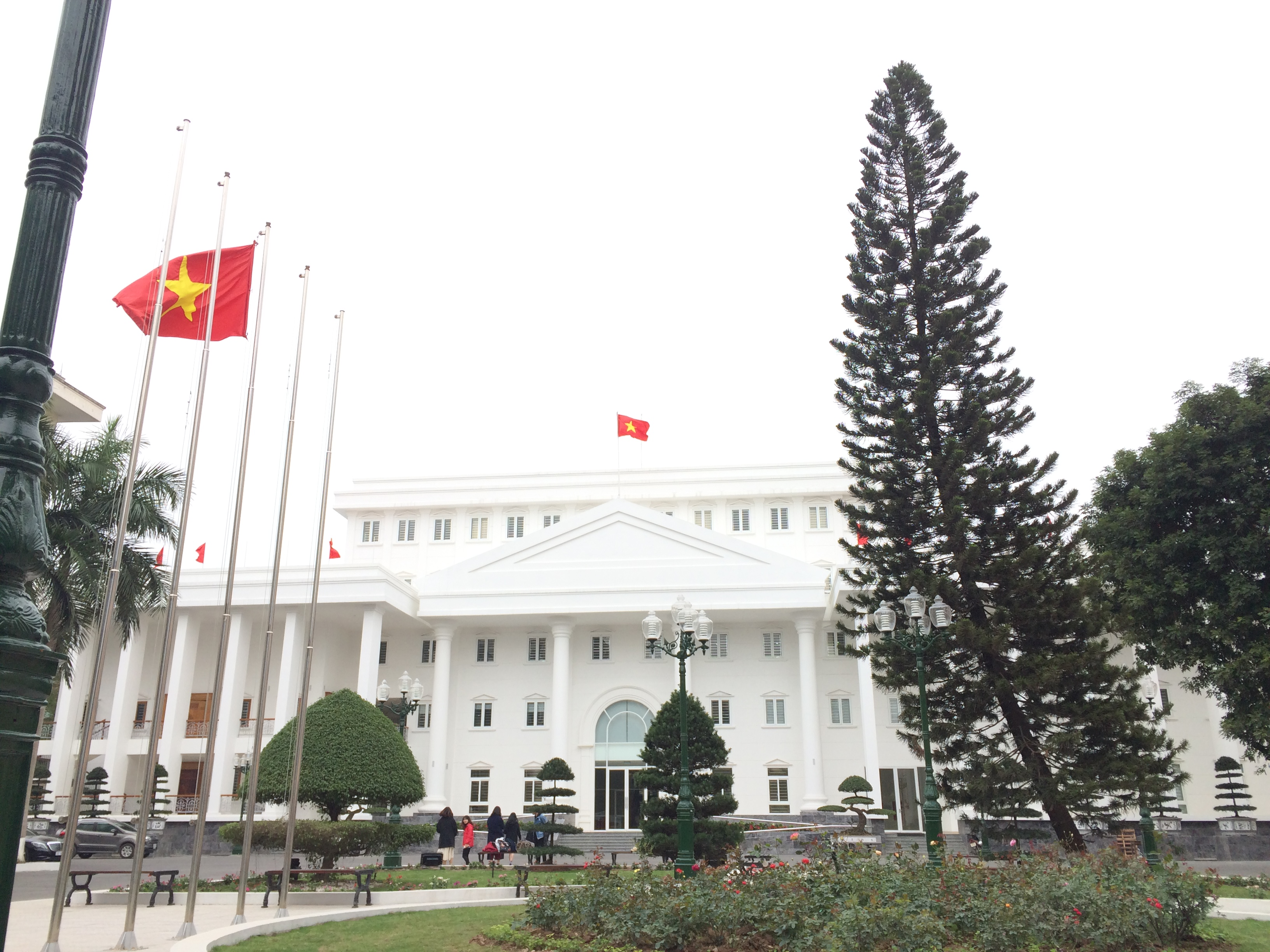
- Other names: HANU
- Former names: Hanoi University of Foreign Studies
- Type: State-owned
- Established: 1959
- Rector: Nguyễn Văn Trào
- Academic staff: 700
- Administrative staff: 100
- Students: 9000
- Undergraduates: 7800
- Location: Km9, Nguyen Trai Road, Thanh Xuân District, Hanoi, Vietnam; 20.9897°N 105.7952°E
- Campus: 6.6 ha (16 acres)
- Website: www.hanu.edu.vn
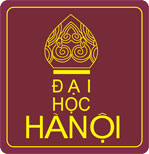

Hanoi University (HANU; Vietnamese: Trường Đại học Hà Nội) (formerly Hanoi University of Foreign Studies), established in 1959 in Hanoi, is an institution for foreign language training and research.

Hanoi University offers bachelor's degrees in 10 languages including English, Chinese, Japanese, Korean, Russian, French, German, Spanish, Italian and Portuguese.

Among these, Masters and PhDs are offered in Russian, English, French and Chinese. Foreign languages offered as second languages are Bulgarian, Hungarian, Polish, Czech, Slovak, Romanian and Thai.

Since 2002, the university has offered Business Bachelor Programs taught in English, in business management, tourism management, international studies, computer science, finance-banking, marketing, accounting and financial technology.

Foreign students make up 10% of the student population, enrolled for business or Vietnamese studies.

== History ==
The former name of Hanoi University is Hanoi University of Foreign Studies (Vietnamese: Đại học Ngoại Ngữ), which is different from the University of Languages and International Studies (directly under the management of Vietnam National University, Hanoi).

== President Board ==
- President: Assoc. Prof. Dr. Nguyen Van Trao.

== Notable alumni ==
- Kaysone Phomvihane
- Vương Đình Huệ
- Đặng Phong
- Trần Văn Lắm
- Ninh Viết Giao
