= Hữu Loan =

Vietnamese poet

- Born: 14 February 1916; Nga Lĩnh, Nga Sơn District, Thanh Hóa Province, Vietnam (at that time French Indochina)
- Died: 18 March 2010 (aged 94); Nga Lĩnh, Nga Sơn District, Thanh Hóa Province, Vietnam
- Occupation: Poet
- Writing career
- Notable work: The Purple Color of Sim Flowers
- Literary movement: Realism

Hữu Loan (January 14, 1916 – March 18, 2010) was a Vietnamese poet, best known for an autobiographical epic of love and the cruelty of war.

Loan was born in Nga Lĩnh, Nga Sơn District, Thanh Hóa Province, French Vietnam. From 1946 to 1954 he served in Ho Chi Minh's Communist army, and fought against the French. It was when he witnessed the cruelty of the war and later the terror of the Land Reform campaigns by Vietnamese Communists. He wrote his best known work Màu tím hoa sim under the inspirations of the events during the Indochina War. He also wrote some poems criticizing Communist regime for which he was imprisoned in a forced labour camp.

== Bibliography ==
- The Purple Color of Sim Flowers
- "Bloody Paradise" (1991)
