= 2016 in Vietnam =

- Decades: 1990s; 2000s; 2010s; 2020s
- See also: Other events of 2016; History of Vietnam; Timeline of Vietnamese history; List of years in Vietnam

== Incumbents ==
- Party General Secretary: Nguyễn Phú Trọng
- President: Trương Tấn Sang, then Trần Đại Quang
- Prime Minister: Nguyễn Tấn Dũng, then Nguyễn Xuân Phúc
- Assembly Chairperson: Nguyen Sinh Hung then Nguyễn Thị Kim Ngân
- Executive Secretary: Lê Hồng Anh then Đinh Thế Huynh

== Events ==
=== January ===
- January 20–28 - 12th National Congress of the Communist Party of Vietnam occurred at the My Dinh National Convention Centre, Hanoi.

=== August ===
- August 5–21 - 7 athletes from Vietnam competed in the 2016 Summer Olympics in Rio de Janeiro, Brazil.

=== October ===
• October 16–17 - Severe flooding in Central Vietnam left at least 21 people dead and submerged tens of thousands of homes.
