= Truyện Trê Cóc =

Satirical poem written in Vietnam in the 13th Century

Truyện Trê Cóc (The chronicle of the catfish and the frog) is a 398-line satirical poem written in Vietnam in the 13th Century.

In the poem a catfish steals the tadpoles of two frogs. The frogs appeal to the mandarin who orders the catfish imprisoned. However the wife of the catfish bribes the mandarin's assistant to have the case re-examined. After inspection of the pond the mandarin's inspectors declare that the tadpoles are the true offspring of the catfish. Along with folk tales such as Thằng Bờm the Truyện Trê Cóc was one of the poems reanalysed by scholars such as Ninh Viết Giao.
