= 2018 in Vietnam =

- Decades: 1990s; 2000s; 2010s; 2020s
- See also: Other events of 2018; History of Vietnam; Timeline of Vietnamese history; List of years in Vietnam

Events in the year 2018 in Vietnam.

== Incumbents ==
- Party General Secretary: Nguyễn Phú Trọng
- President: Trần Đại Quang (until 21 September), Nguyễn Phú Trọng (since 23 October)
- Prime Minister: Nguyễn Xuân Phúc
- Assembly Chairperson: Nguyễn Thị Kim Ngân

== Events ==
- 23 March – A fire at a condominium complex in Ho Chi Minh City, Vietnam, kills at least 13 people and injures another 27, with most people dying of suffocation or jumping from high floors.
- 15–21 July – Tropical Storm Son-Tinh hits Vietnam, causing floods and landslides in areas around Hanoi.
- 23 October – Nguyễn Phú Trọng is sworn in to the post of President of Vietnam, becoming the third Vietnamese official to simultaneously lead the Communist Party while serving as head of state.

== Deaths ==
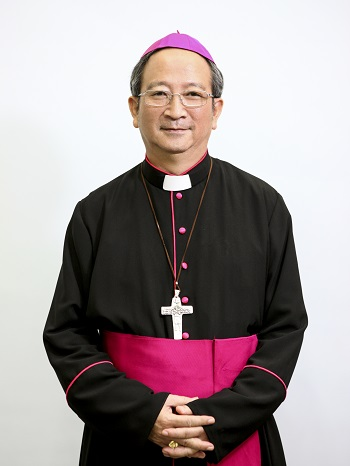
Paul Bùi Văn Đọc

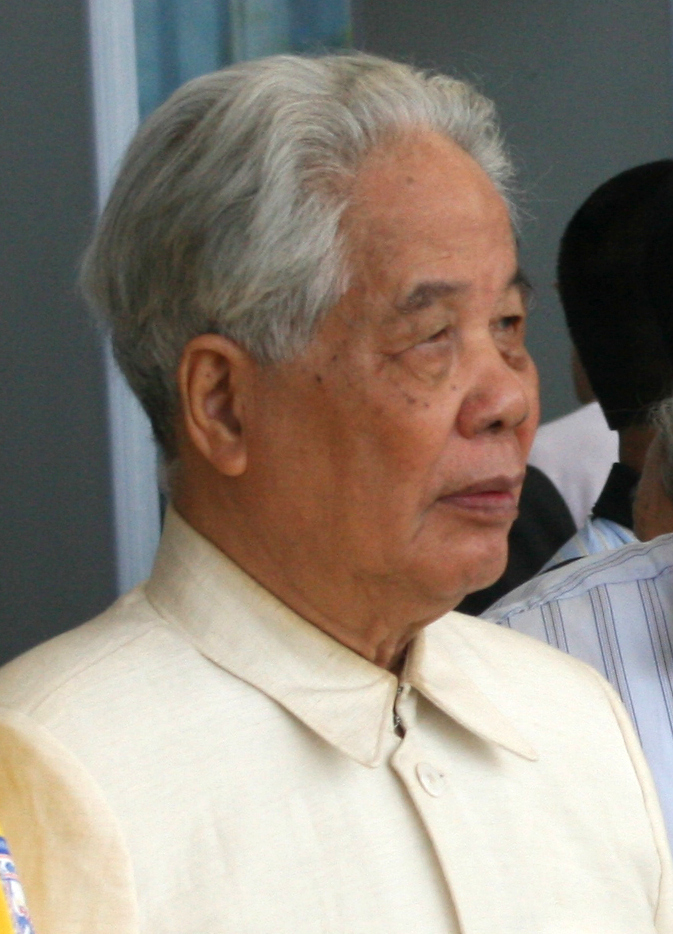
Đỗ Mười

- 4 February – Hoàng Vân, songwriter and composer (b. 1930).
- 11 February – Lâm Ngươn Tánh, military officer (b. 1928).
- 6 March – Paul Bùi Văn Đọc, Roman Catholic prelate (b. 1944).
- 17 March – Phan Văn Khải, 5th Prime Minister of Vietnam (b. 1933).
- 23 June – Phan Huy Lê, historian (b. 1934).
- 21 September – Trần Đại Quang, 9th President of Vietnam (b. 1956).
- 1 October – Đỗ Mười, 5th Leader of Vietnam (b. 1917).
