= Christ the King Cathedral, Nha Trang =

Coordinates: 12.2468°N 109.1881°E

Christ the King Cathedral
- Nhà thờ chính tòa Kitô Vua
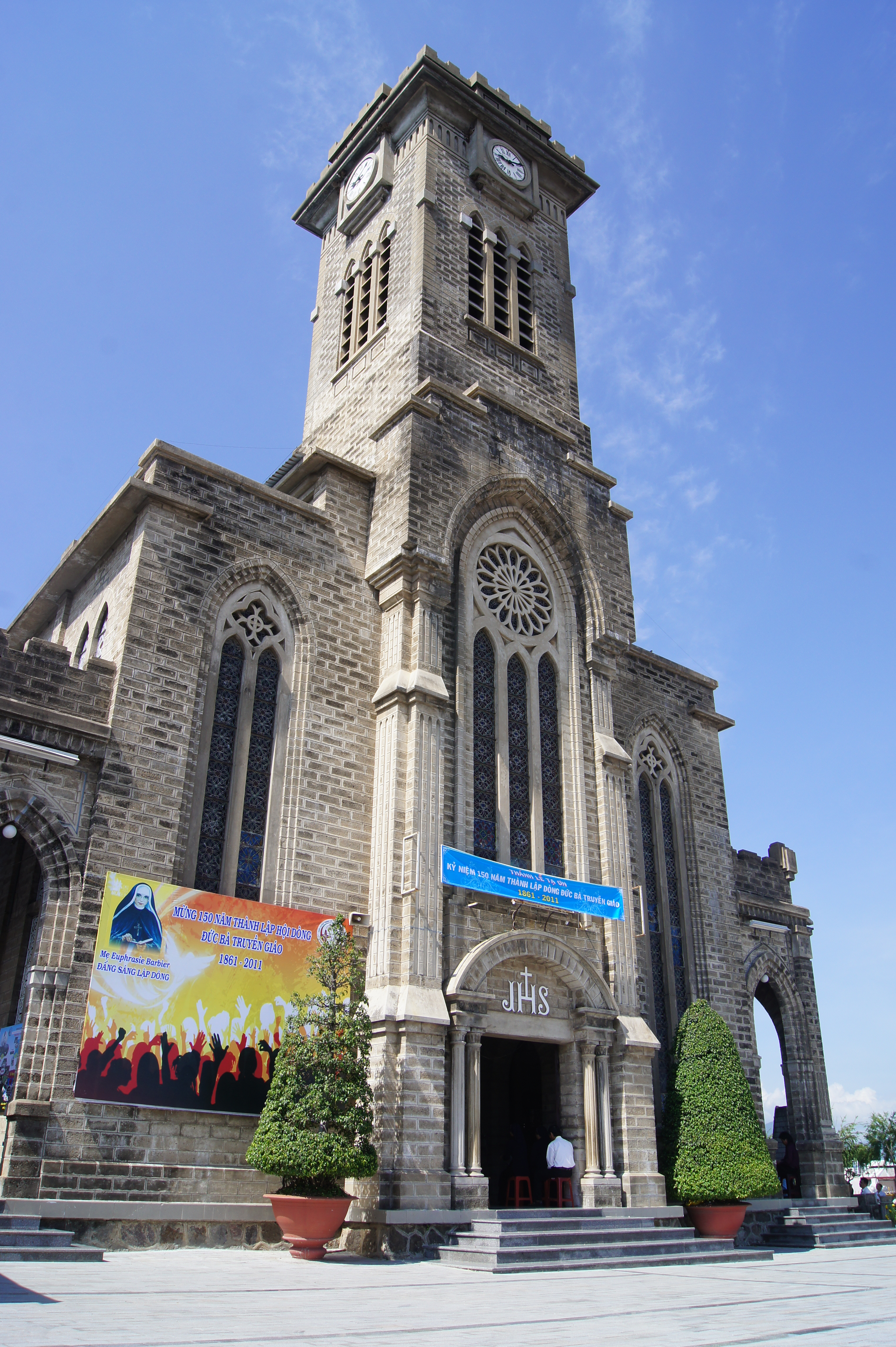
- Location: Nha Trang, Khánh Hòa province
- Country: Vietnam
- Denomination: Roman Catholic Church

Architecture
- Architectural type: Gothic Style

Specifications
- Height: 38 m (125 ft)

Map

The Christ the King Cathedral (Vietnamese: Nhà thờ chính tòa Kitô Vua; French: Cathédrale du Christ-Roi), also called Nha Trang Cathedral (Vietnamese: Nhà thờ Núi Nha Trang), is the mother church of the Roman Catholic Diocese of Nha Trang in Nha Trang, Khanh Hoa in Central Vietnam.

In 1886, a parish was founded by French missionaries in the Apostolic Vicariate of Quinhon and the present cathedral was built in the Gothic Revival style in 1928 as the parish church. It was consecrated on 14 May 1933 under the title of "Christ the King". Then it was attended by a French priest in the Foreign Missions of Paris, Louis Vallet (1869–1945), who devoted his life to parishioners and was subsequently buried there.

When the Apostolic Vicariate of Nha Trang was erected in 1957 through Crescit Laetissimo by Pope Pius XII and the Diocese of Nha Trang created in 1960, with Paul Raymond Marie Marcel Piquet from the Foreign Missions as the first bishop, the church was chosen as the cathedral.

The Cathedral, very well located in the upper part of this coastal city next to the Nha Trang Station, has a remarkable amount of stained glass windows depicting saints, including several French saints, such as St. Joan of Arc and St. John Vianney, and episodes from the life of Jesus.

Archbishop Colomban Dreyer – the Apostolic Delegate to Indochina – blessed the Cathedral's bell, the gift from a catholic in Saigon, on 29 July 1934. The bell tower was completed on 3 December 1935.

== Gallery ==
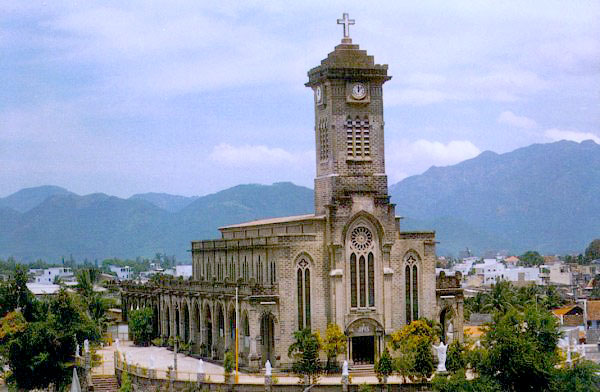
Front view

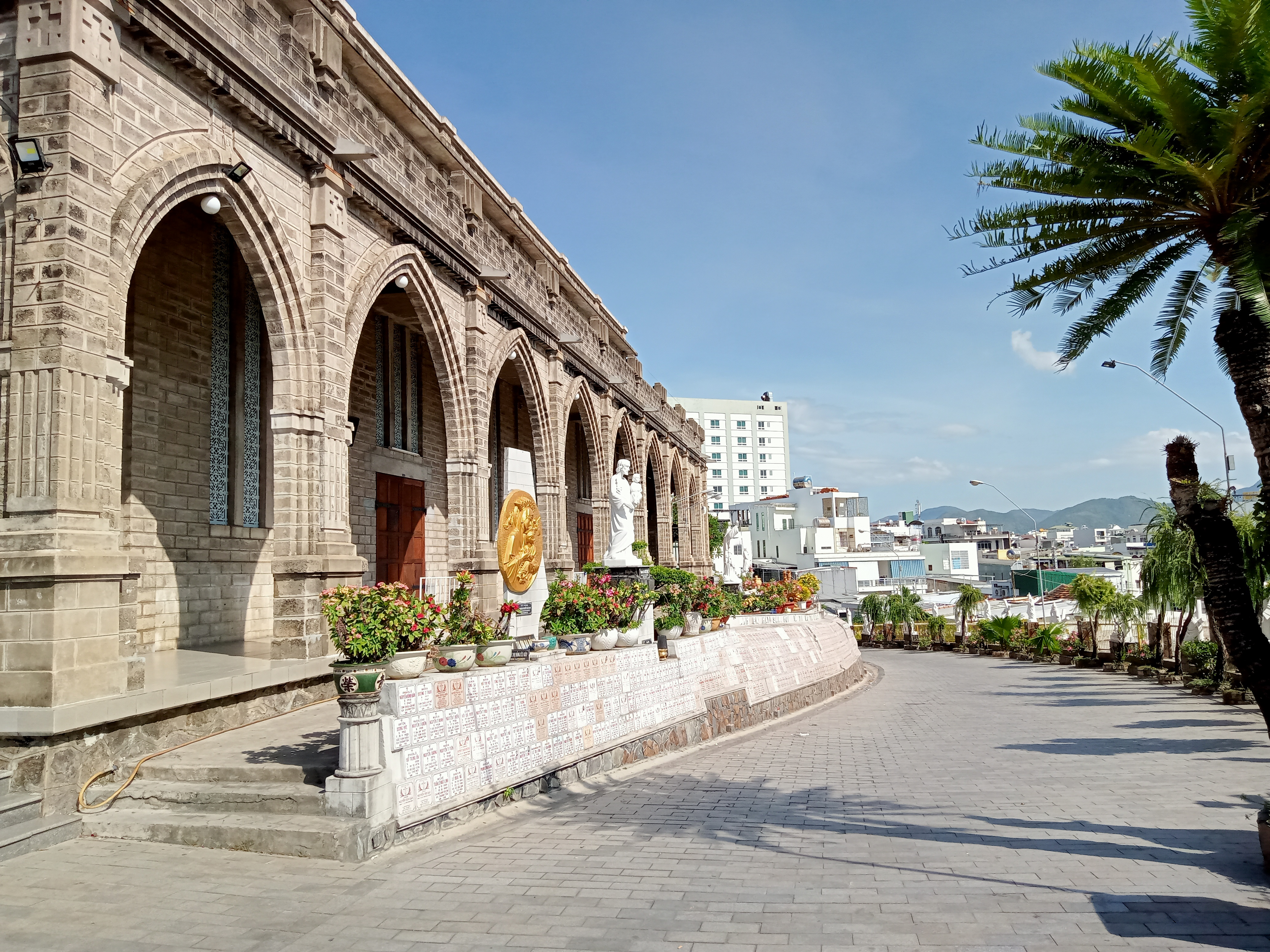
Main entrance

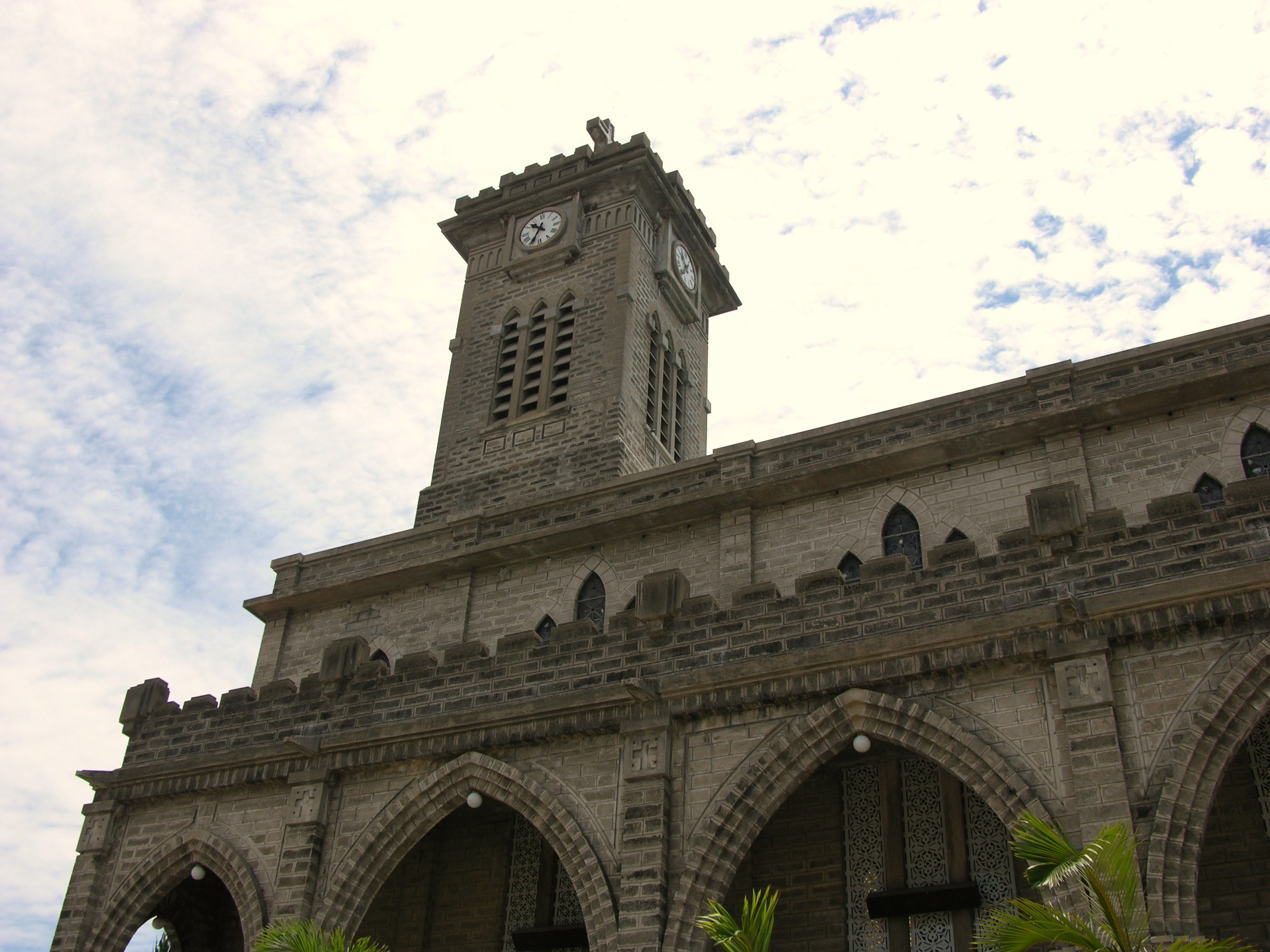
Side

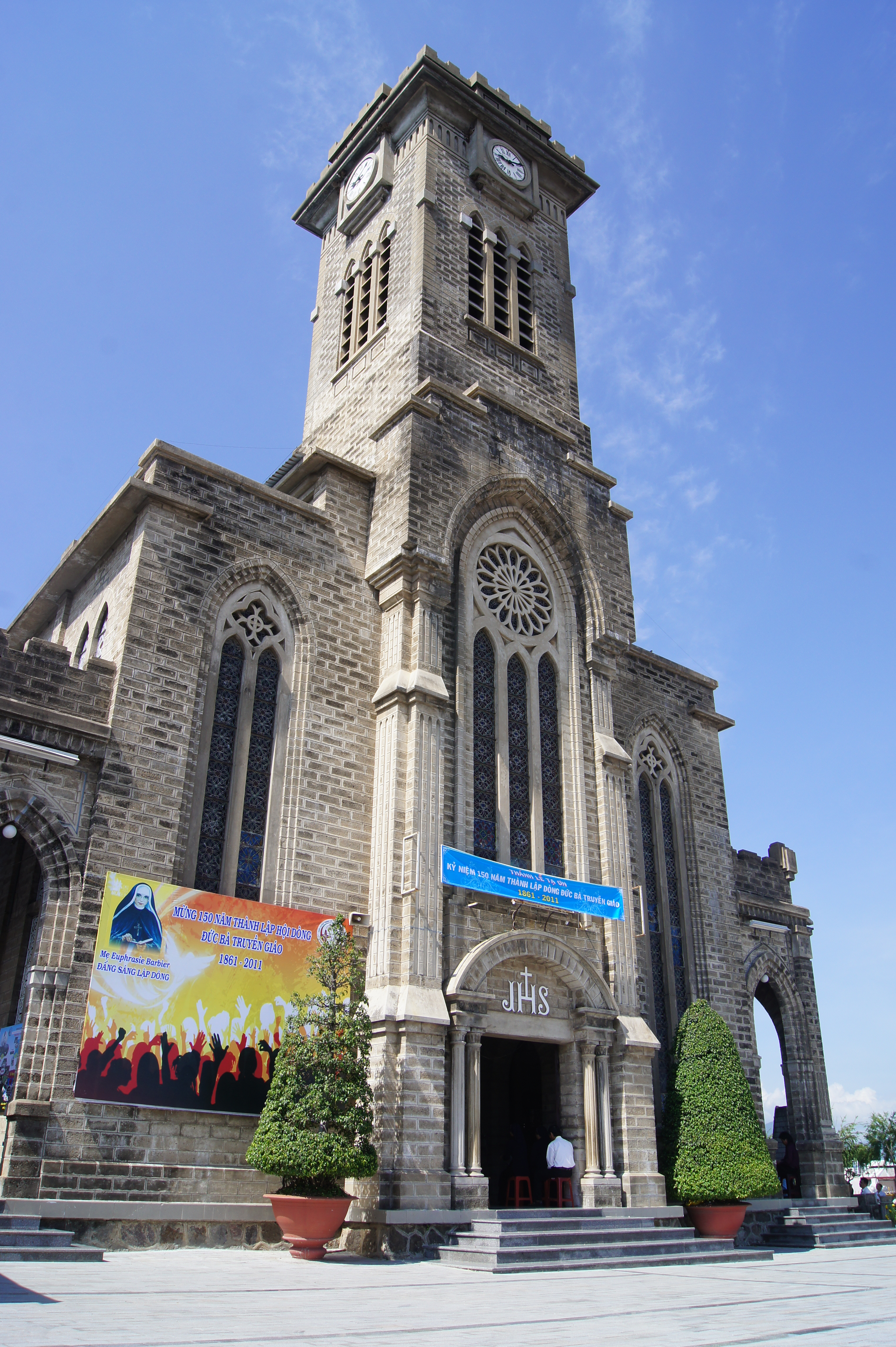
Façade

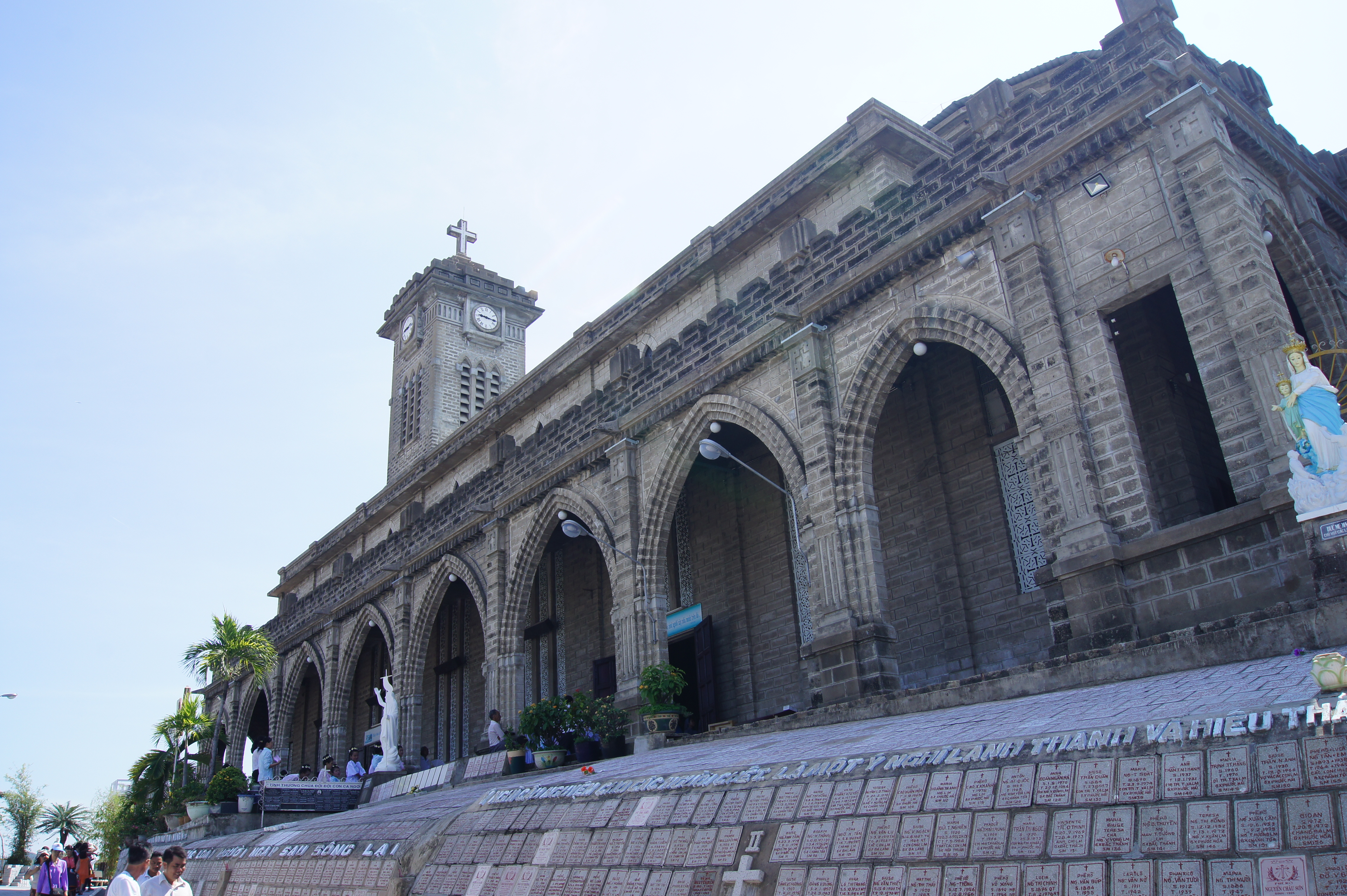
Side

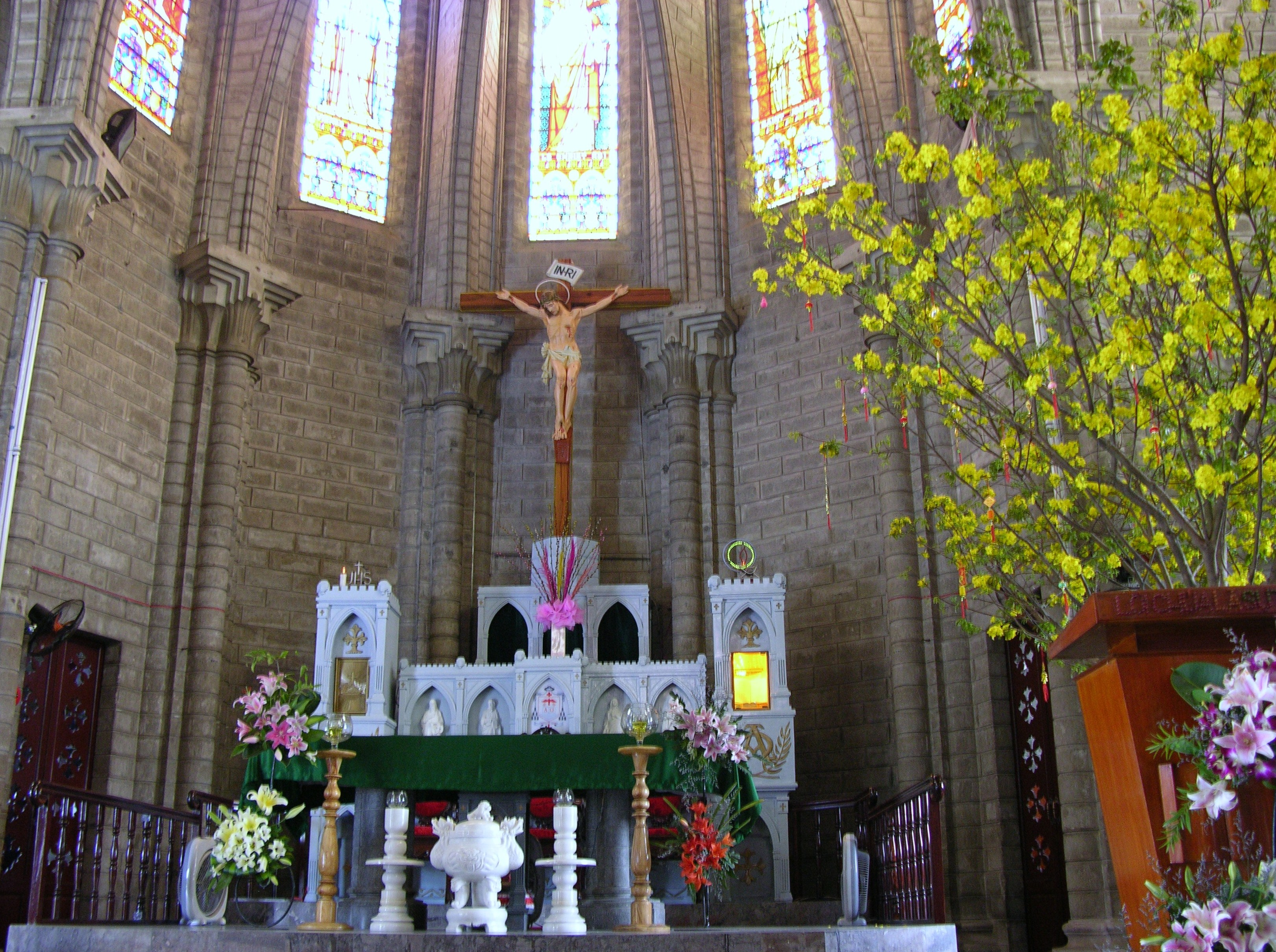
Apse

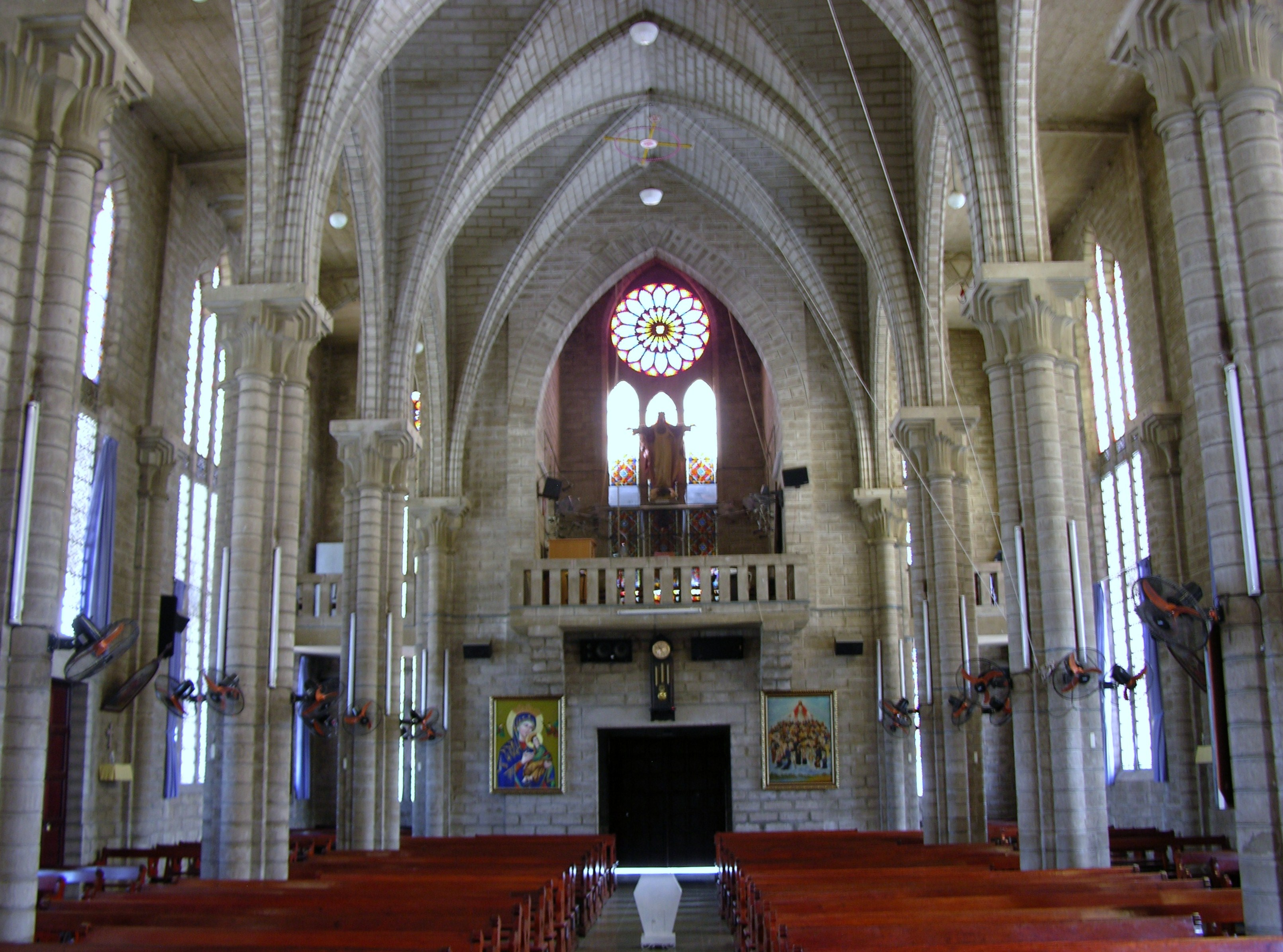
Choir loft

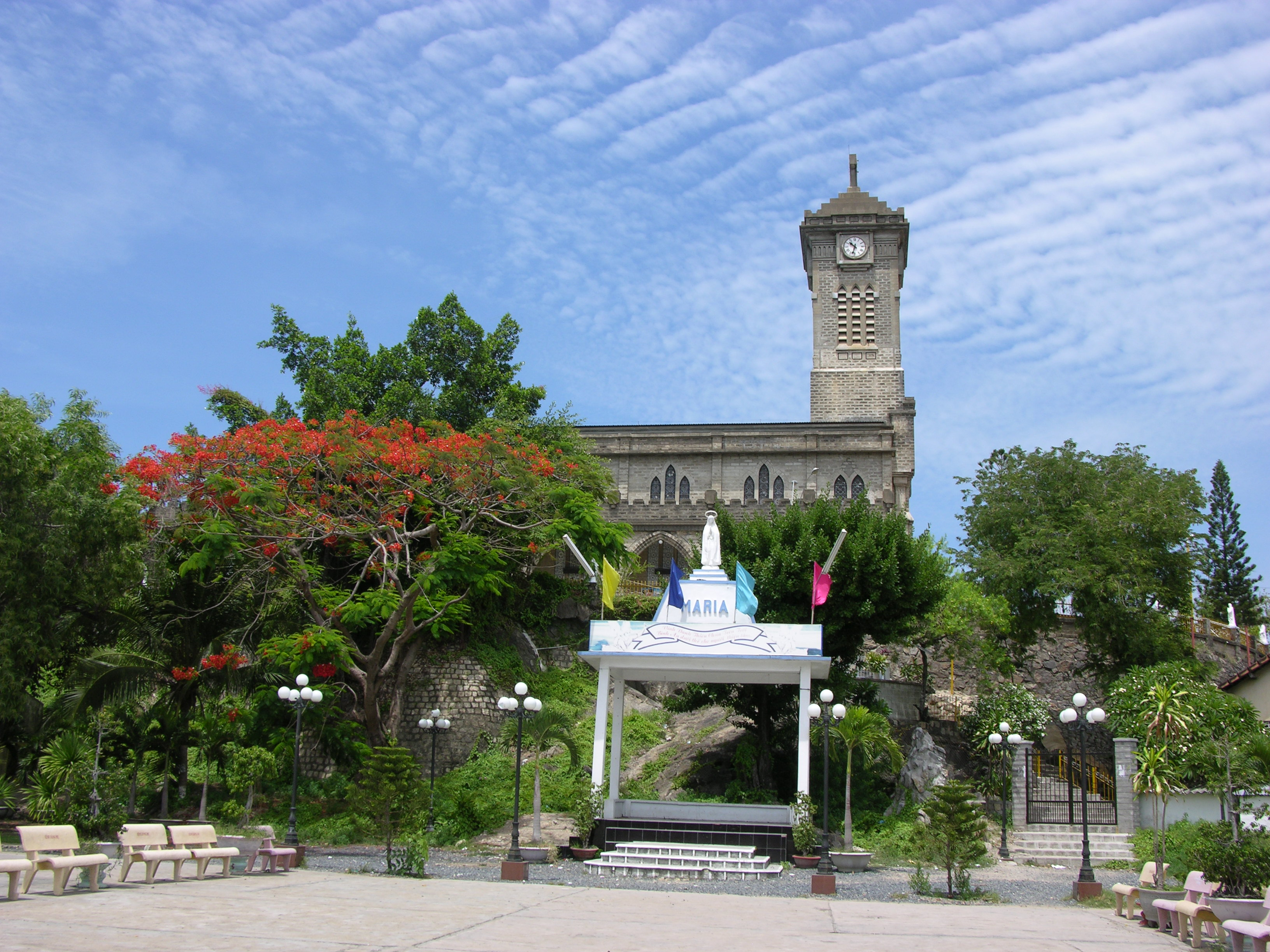
Side view of the church from Our Lady Square

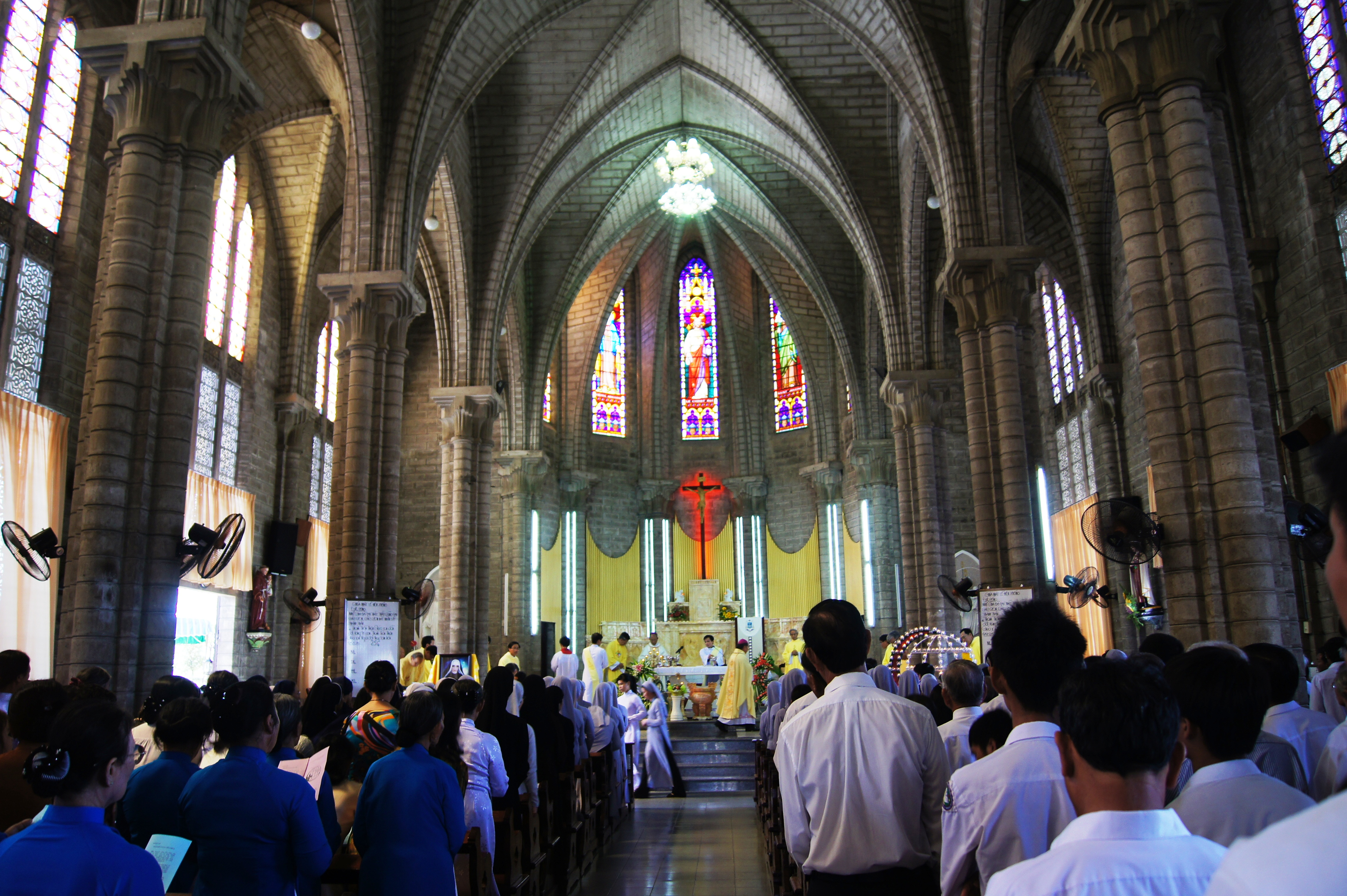
A Mass at the Cathedral

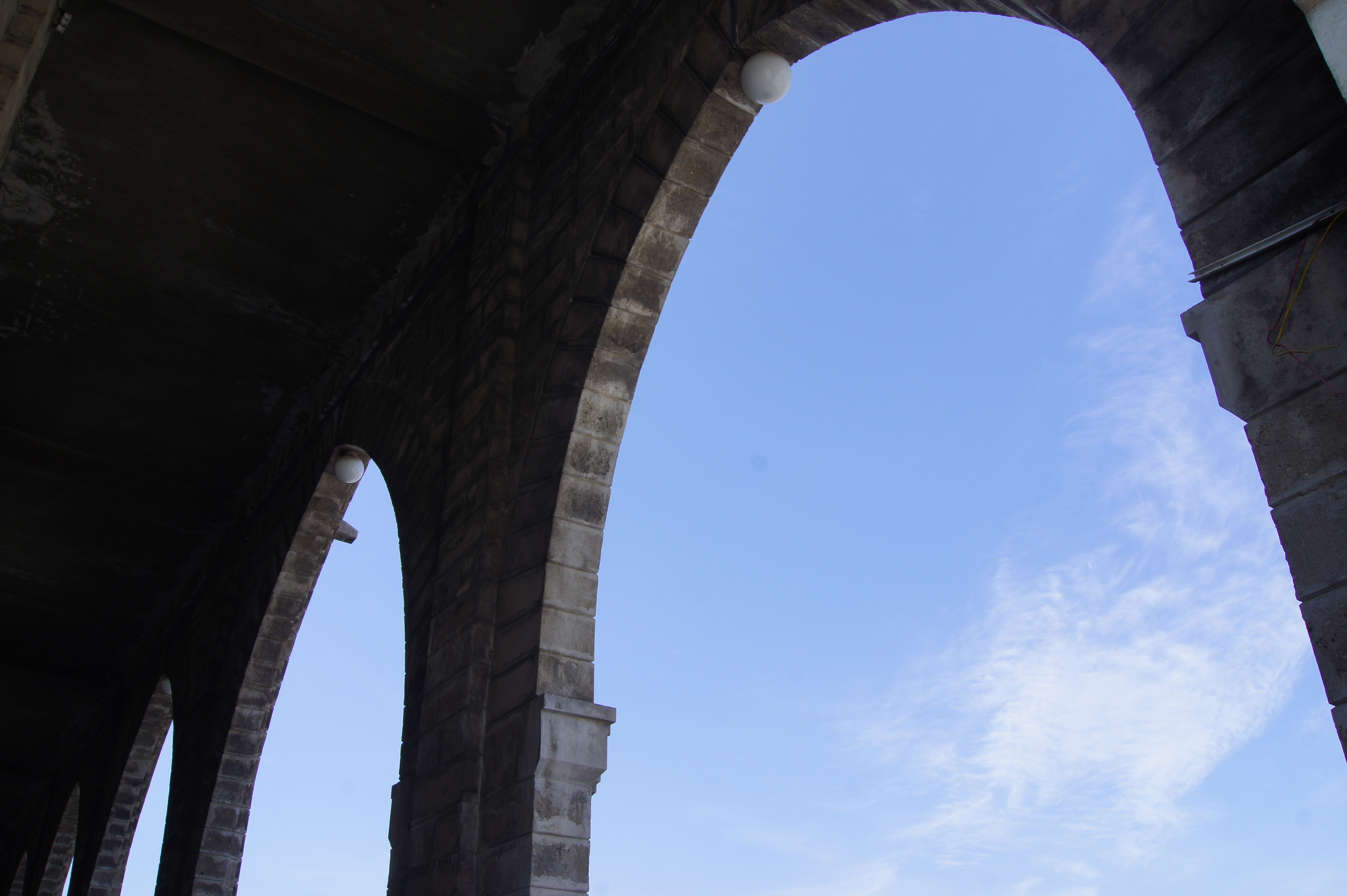
Arched door architecture in the hallway

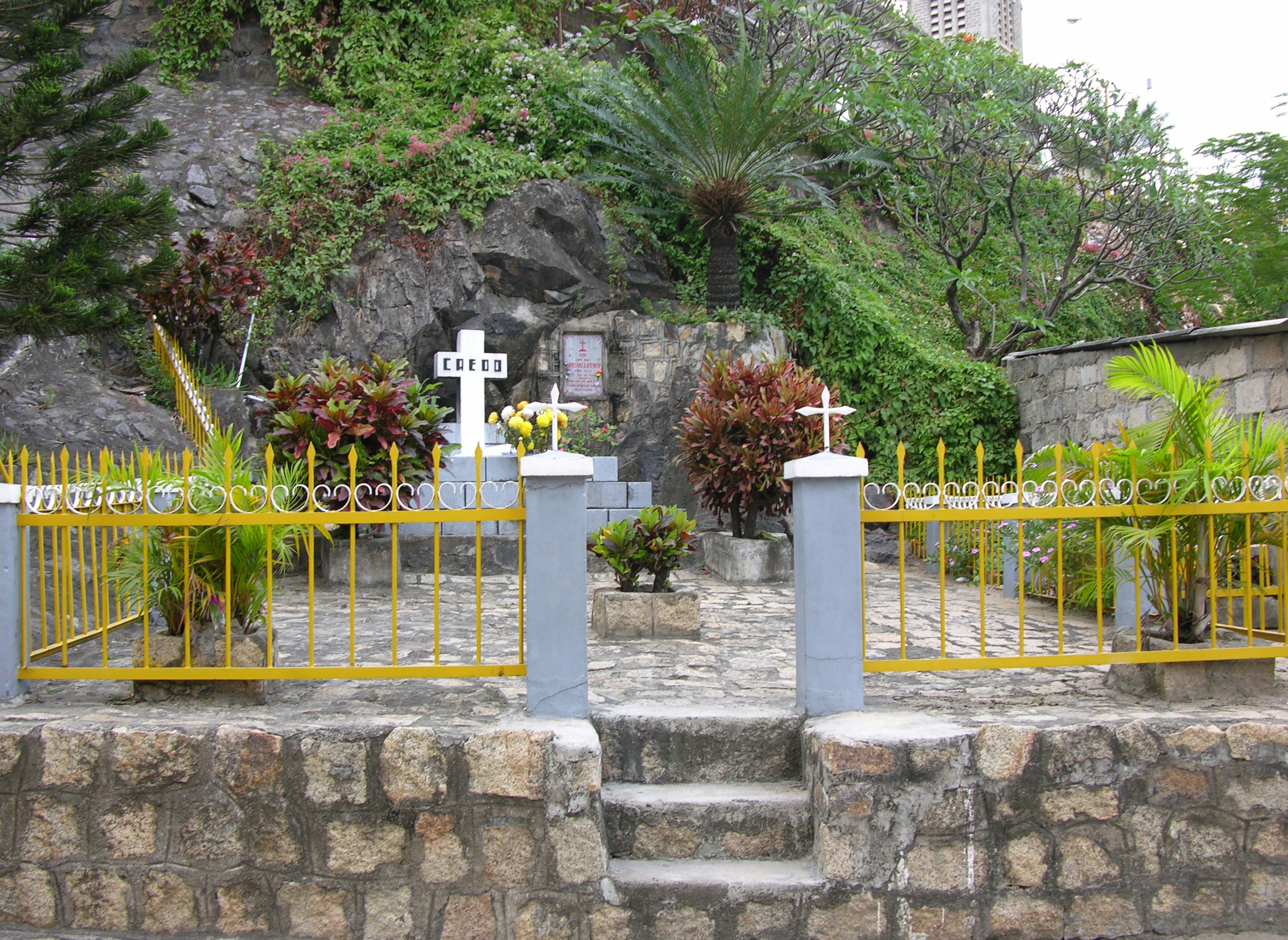
The grave of Fr. Louis Vallet

== See also ==
- Roman Catholicism in Vietnam
