= Nga Sơn district =

Nga Sơn district Huyện Nga Sơn
- District
- Location of the seat of the district in Vietnam
- Coordinates: 19°59′N 105°58′E
- Country: Vietnam
- Region: North Central Coast
- Province: Thanh Hóa
- Capital: Nga Sơn

Area
  - Total: 58 sq mi (151 km^{2})

Population (2018)
  - Total: 155,200
- Time zone: UTC+7 (UTC + 7)
- Postal code: 440000

Nga Sơn is a district (huyện) of Thanh Hóa province in the North Central Coast region of Vietnam. The district capital is Nga Sơn.

The district features many historical vestiges. These include Từ Thức grotto, Tien Pagoda (Chùa Tiên), and legends referring to Mai An Tiêm who, the story goes, was exiled to the then uninhabited islands, now known as Nga Son and Thanh Hoa.

Nga Sơn villagers were known for planting sedge -a grass-like plant with triangular stems, and weaving mats.

== Demographics ==
In 2018, the population of Nga Sơn was estimated to be about 155,200.

== Geography ==
The district is located northeast of the Thanh Hóa province. It is approximately 42 kilometers (26 mi) from Thanh Hóa. The district shares a border to the north and east with the Ninh Bình province, to the west with the Hà Trung district, and to the south with the Hậu Lộc district.

The district terrain consists mainly of plains and includes the Len River, which flows through the southern district of Nga Sơn.

With a coastline about 20 kilometers (12 mi) long, Nga Sơn annually encroaches into the sea some 80–100 kilometers (50–62 mi) per year due to alluvium deposits from the Red and Day Rivers.

== Economy ==
Nga Son hosts multiple district schools.

== Climate ==
Province	District	Jan	Feb	Mar	Apr	May	Jun	Jul	Aug	Sep	Oct	Nov	Dec	Year
Thanh Hóa	Nga Sơn	22°/16°	25°/20°	25°/20°	30°/24°	31°/25°	34°/26°	32°/26°	31°/25°	31°/25°	29°/23°	27°/20°	22°/18°	28°/22°

== Things to Do ==
- Phat Diem Cathedral
