= Trần Lâm =

Vietnamese journalist

Trần Quảng Vận
- Born: 1922
- Died: 2011 (aged 88–89)
- Occupation: Journalist
- Known for: Voice of Vietnam (Director)

Trần Quảng Vận, pen name Trần Lâm (1922–2011), was a Vietnamese journalist. He was director of Voice of Vietnam for 43 years.
