= Bà Tùng Long =

Vietnamese author and teacher (1915–2006)

- 黎氏白雲
- Born: Lê Thị Bạch Vân; 1 August 1915; Đà Nẵng, French Annam
- Died: 26 April 2006 (aged 90); Saigon, Vietnam
- Resting place: Trung Việt Ái Hữu Cemetery, Thủ Đức District, Saigon
- Occupations: Novelist, short story writer, journalist, teacher
- Spouse: Nguyễn Đức Huy (s. 1935 t. 1985)
- Children: Nguyễn Thị Thanh Hương; Nguyễn Thị Nghi Xương; Nguyễn Đức Trạch; Nguyễn Đức Lập; Nguyễn Đức Thạch; Nguyễn Đức Thông; Nguyễn Thị Thanh Bình; Nguyễn Thị Thanh Thái; Nguyễn Thị Phương Chi
- Relatives: Lê Tường (father)
- Writing career
- Pen name: Bà Tùng Long (婆從龍)
- Genre: Romance
- Notable work: Memoir of Bà Tùng Long
- Literary movement: New Literature of Vietnam

Bà Tùng Long (1915–2006) was a Vietnamese author and teacher.

== Biography ==
Lê Thị Bạch Vân (Chinese: 黎氏白雲), courtesy name Tùng Long (從龍), pen name Bà Tùng Long (婆從龍 / "Madame Tùng Long") was born on 1 August 1915 in Đà Nẵng, French Annam. Her father Lê Tường was a journalist and politician who participated in the Restoration Movement of Annam as a liaison man.

She attended primary school in Đà Nẵng and then studied for one year at Đồng Khánh High School in Huế. In 1932, she moved with her father to Saigon and studied at Collège Des Jeunes Filles Indigènes. There, she met her future husband, journalist Nguyễn Đức Huy, who went under the name Hồng Tiêu.

She began her career as a journalist with the Phụ Nữ Tân Văn newspaper, and, after it was suspended, then became the editor in chief for the Tân Thời newspaper. However, this newspaper was also suspended quickly. Afterwards, she became a teacher for the French and Cochinchinese language at Tôn Thọ Tường school, while working as a collaborator for the Saigon newspaper. During World War II, her family returned to the Nghĩa Kỳ commune in Quảng Ngãi Province to settle. She was appointed as the headmistress for all of Nghĩa Kỳ's schools by the local educational office.

In 1951, her family, this time with three more children, moved to Hội An. She worked as a professor at several schools, but the salaries were low, so she continued to work as a newspaper collaborator. Since 1954, her pen name Bà Tùng Long became commonplace in the Gỡ Rối Tơ Lòng (New Saigon Newspaper) and Tâm Tình Cởi Mở (Echo Newspaper). She was known as a writer for women and their families.

After the Geneva Conference, her family moved back to Saigon, where she continued to work both as a professor and a newspaper collaborator. In 1960, she was elected as Secretary General for the Revolutionary Women's Association. She was also Quảng Ngãi Province's congresswoman. In 1972, she declared that she would not be writing any more. 31 years later, she published one final work, her memoir, Memoir of Bà Tùng Long.

== Career ==
Lê published a great deal of books, covering topics like family, love and the fate of women.

- Disenchanted chamber (Lầu tỉnh mộng, 1956)
- Love fate (Tình duyên, 1956)
- Bright tomorrow (Ngày mai tươi sáng, 1956)
- Love and honor (Ái tình và danh dự, 1957)
- Money lord and silver lord (chúa tiền chúa bạc, 1957)
- Còn Vương Tơ Lòng (1957)
- Fortune of my husband's family (Giang san nhà chồng, 1957)
- Hai Trẻ Đánh Giày (1957)
- Miniature rose (Hoa tỷ muội, 1957)
- Mother-in-law and bride (Mẹ chồng nàng dâu, 1957)
- Lady Nhị Lan (Nhị Lan, 1957)
- One older sister (Một người chị, 1957)
- Tấm Lòng Bác Ái (1957)
- Vợ Lớn Vợ Bé (1957)
- Tình Vạn Dặm (1958)
- Tình và Nghĩa (1958)
- Good wife (Vợ hiền, 1958)
- Trên Đồi Thông (1963)
- A happy road (Con đường hạnh phúc, 1963)
- Giòng Đời (1966)
- Ai Là Mẹ (1967)
- Bên Suối Chi Lan (1967)
- Biệt Thự Mỹ Khanh (1967)
- Chọn Đá Thử Vàng (1967)
- Duyên Lành (1967)
- Giữa Cơn Sóng Gió (1967)
- Một Bóng Người (1967)
- Những Phút Chia Ly (1967)
- Silent affair (Tình câm, 1967)
- Testament's paper (Tờ di chúc, 1967)
- Manual for good wives (Cẩm nang người vợ hiền, 1968)
- Memoir of Bà Tùng Long (Hồi ký Bà Tùng Long, 2003)

== Family ==
- Parents : Lê Tường (father)
- Husband : Nguyễn Đức Huy (married in 1935 until his death in 1985)
- Sons : Nguyễn Đức Trạch, Nguyễn Đức Lập, Nguyễn Đức Thạch, Nguyễn Đức Thông
- Daughters : Nguyễn Thị Thanh Hương, Nguyễn Thị Nghi Xương, Nguyễn Thị Thanh Bình, Nguyễn Thị Thanh Thái, Nguyễn Thị Phương Chi
