= Thằng Bờm =

Thằng Bờm (Bờm the Fool, Bờm the village idiot) is a Vietnamese folktale character.

== Content ==
The Thằng Bờm stories, along with poems like the satirical Truyện Trê Cóc, were among the folktales reanalysed by socialist scholars.
