= Binh Pho =

Vietnamese-American artist (1955–2017)

- Born: September 19, 1955; Saigon, South Vietnam
- Died: August 23, 2017 (aged 61)
- Education: DeVry University, Kansas City, MO
- Occupation: Artist in wood

Binh Pho (September 19, 1955 – August 23, 2017) was a Vietnamese-American artist best known for his pierced and painted works in wood.

== Early life ==
Binh Pho grew up in Saigon during the Vietnam War. His childhood memories are for the most part pleasant, though he remembered the horrors of the Tet Offensive and other fearful moments. When the “Red Peace” descended upon the land in 1975, he refused to accept Communism. He tried to escape but was captured and sent to a re-education camp for a year where he was brutally beaten and tortured by communist cadres. After three more attempts he finally made his escape in 1978 as one of the boat people. The journey from his childhood in Vietnam to life as an artist in the United States is one of struggle and perseverance, yet he viewed it as a philosophical acceptance of destiny through the lens of the happiness and success he found in the United States. Binh Pho arrived in the United States on May 7, 1979, and initially focused on higher education, receiving a bachelor's degree in electronics in 1982. He became a United States citizen in 1984. An early breakthrough in Pho's work was meeting the Canadian woodturner Frank Sudol at the Arrowmont School of Arts and Crafts. Sudol's piercing and airbrushing techniques opened a new world of self-expression for Pho. He combined the techniques with lessons learned from other woodturners; the use of color as employed by Giles Gilson and Michael Hosaluk, a sense of continuity learned from Michael Mode, and the use of metal leaf in the work of furniture maker David Marks. He was also influenced by 20th century Surrealist painters and sculptors, notably Salvador Dalí and Mihail Chemiakin.

== Career ==
Binh Pho began selling his work in 1995, quickly gaining the attention of art collectors and devoted increasing time to his work. For much of his career, the work was autobiographical in nature, sharing the story of his life in Vietnam and pursuit of freedom in the United States. In 2006, the book River of Destiny: The Life and Work of Binh Pho was published in conjunction with an exhibition of the artist's work at the Long Beach Museum of Art in California. In the book, curator and author Kevin Wallace shared Binh Pho's life story, Vietnamese history and philosophy.

== Technique ==
For Pho, part of the attraction of working with wood was the poetic similarity he saw between trees and human beings and he approached the material with reverence. A love of color, Eastern imagery and modern art are obvious in his pieces. After turning a vessel and carefully preparing its surface, Pho sketched the layout of the decoration, utilizing a principle of Chinese landscape painting, in which the eye is drawn into a vast landscape by the inclusion of a temple or cottage. He used an airbrush to apply paint to the surface. He then employed ultraspeed drills to etch and pierce sections of the vessel. The piercing creates negative space that contrasts with the wood that remains and patterns that mimic natural phenomena. Binh Pho is particularly known for his use of form, instinctively designing works that utilize ratios that are very close to the theoretical “golden section” that can be seen in works dating back through antiquity. As the artist's work progressed, he moved beyond vessel making to create monumental sculptures and wall pieces. Binh Pho was a highly sought-after demonstrator and lecturer.

== Permanent Collections ==
- Renwick Gallery, Smithsonian American Art Museum, Washington, D.C.
- Cincinnati Art Museum, Cincinnati, OH
- Bellevue Arts Museum, Bellevue, WA
- University of Michigan Museum of Art, Ann Arbor MI
- Museum of Art and Design, New York, NY
- Long Beach Museum of Art, Long Beach, CA
- Mobile Museum of Art, Mobile, AL
- Detroit Institute of Arts, Detroit, MI
- Figge Museum of Art, Davenport, IA
- White House Collection, Washington, D.C.
- Wood Turning Center, Philadelphia, PA
- Arrowmont School of Arts and Crafts, Gatlinburg, TN
- Carnegie Museum of Art, Pittsburgh, PA
- Mint Museum, Charlotte, NC
- Fuller Craft Art Museum, Brockton, MA
- Musee Art du bois, Breville, France
- Minneapolis Institute of Art, Minneapolis, MN

== Shadow of The Turning ==
In 2012, Binh Pho again collaborated with Kevin Wallace on Shadow of The Turning, referred to by art critic David M. Fry as “a visual and literary amalgam that was audacious in almost every way”. The book and museum exhibition was an exploration of art, myth and philosophy, drawing upon diverse genres and media to bring the viewer into a fascinating literary adventure. With the jointly imagined work of fiction, Binh used the elaborate tale to frame a new body of work. In essence, the art became illustration for the story. The exhibition sought to create a bridge between literature, art world approaches to concept and narrative and craft traditions. The story was “illustrated” with works that combined woodturning, sculpture, painting and art glass. As the storyline explored collaboration, a diverse group of international artists were brought together to collaborate on works of art that celebrate traditional craft materials and processes to redefine the boundaries of contemporary art. The structure of the exhibition and its individual works suggested the enduring importance of architecture to Pho, who studied the subject in college in Vietnam.
