= Chu Tử =

Vietnamese journalist and writer

Chu Tử 朱子
- Born: Chu Văn Bình (朱文平); 17 April 1917; Mía Village, Sơn Tây Province, French Tonkin
- Died: 30 April 1975 (aged 58); Lòng Tảo River, Cần Giờ District, Saigon, (South Vietnam) Republic of Vietnam
- Resting place: Cần Giờ Water Front, Saigon, (South Vietnam) Republic of Vietnam
- Occupations: Journalist, writer, teacher, lawyer
- Children: Chu Vi Sơn (son); Chu Vị Thủy (daughter); Chu Long (son); Chu Trọng Ly (son)
- Writing career
- Pen name: Chu Tử, Kha Trấn Ác...
- Genre: Romance
- Notable works: Love; Jealousy; Chaos; Living; Money
- Literary movement: New Literature of Vietnam

Chu Tử (Chinese: 朱子, 1917 - 1975) was a Vietnamese journalist and writer.

== Biography ==
Chu Tử was born Chu Văn Bình (朱文平) on 17 April 1917 at Mía Village, Sơn Tây Province (now Hanoi). He graduated with a Bachelor of Laws degree at the Ecole Supérieure de Droit et Administration. He was in the same academic year with Nguyễn Thái Học. On the night of 10 February 1930, he followed VNQDĐ leader Nguyễn Khắc Nhu attacking the Hưng Hóa Fortress. However, VNQDĐ lost the battle, and he escaped swimming across the river and returned to Hanoi to continue his study.

During the Việt Minh years, Chu Văn Bình worked as a local lawyer. With the State of Vietnam, he was the principal of Phùng Hưng Private School in Haiphong and then Lê Văn Trung Primary-Secondary School in Tây Ninh.

After the Saigon Coup, with freedom of the press attaining relatively more leeway, he established the Living Daily News (Nhật-báo Sống) newspaper at Hồ Xuân Hương Road (old Saigon) and started using pen name of Chu Tử. In 1966, the Living Daily News was attacked by UBSV forces. On 16 April 1966, he was shot 4 times from a Colt 9 gun near his house (next to Hoài An School, Phú Nhuận District, Saigon) but luckily survived the attempted murder. The Saigon public opinion doubted that Việt Cộng was involved, and the Republic of Vietnam press found out soon afterward that the culprit was a member of the UBSV.

At the end of the 1960s, Living Daily News was shut down permanently for continuously condemning the Vietnamese government for allowing the United States Military stationing with complete control of Cam Ranh Bay. Living Daily News articles called that act as "betraying the country". In 1971, Chu Tử re-established his old newspaper as Tidal Wave Daily News (Nhật-báo Sóng-Thần), then Viet People D.N. (Dân-Việt), Life D.N. (Ðời), but these newspapers only lasted in short duration.

With the 30th April 1975, at 10:00 a.m., Chu Tử was killed by an RPG-2 while standing on the deck of the Việt Nam Thương Tín ship attempting to escape Saigon. He with one boy were buried at Cần Giờ water front.

== Career ==
Aside from being a journalist, Chu Tử authored numerous short stories and novels. Listed are his most famous books.

- Love (Yêu, 1963). Based to 1973 movie by director Đỗ Tiến Đức.
- Chaos 1 : Living (Sống, 1963)
- Chaos 2 (Loạn, 1964)
- Pond for ducks (Ao thả vịt, 1967)
- Low wind (Gió thấp)
- Jealousy (Ghen)
- Money (Tiền)

== Family ==
Chu Tử had four children:

- Chu Vi Sơn (son): Reporter of the Front Daily News (Nhật-báo Tiền-Tuyến) pre-1975. He lived in Brainerd, MN with his family until 2001. He has 4 children (3 daughters and 1 son).
- Chu Vị Thủy (daughter). She has 3 children (3 sons).
- Chu Long (son). He has one child (1 daughter).
- Chu Trọng Ly (son): Committed suicide with an M1 carbine at age 14.
