= Đặng Phong =

Vietnamese economic historian

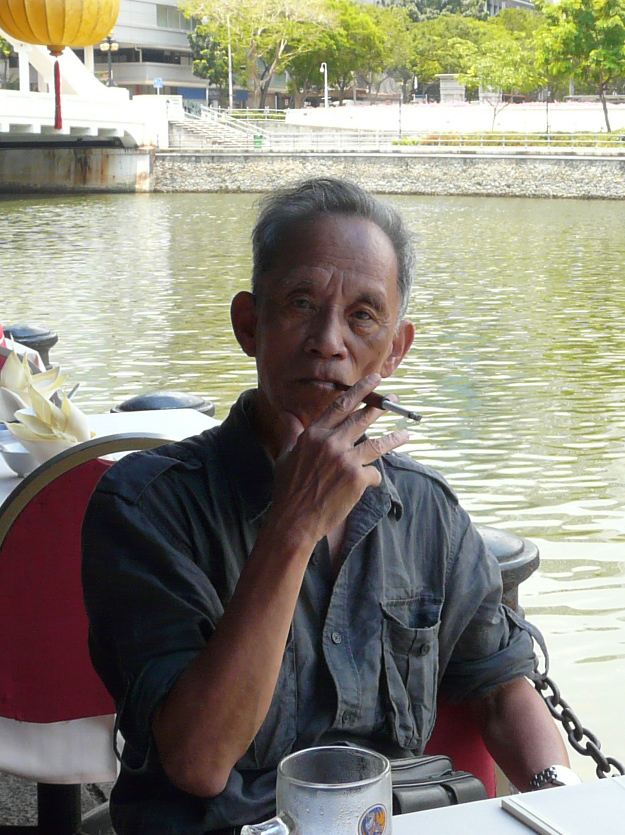
- Phong in 2010.
- Born: November 4, 1937; Hà Tây, Vietnam
- Died: August 20, 2010 (aged 72); Hanoi, Vietnam

Academic background
- Education: Hanoi University; National Economics University

Academic work
- Institutions: Vietnam Institute of Economics; Tạp chí Thị trường & Giá cả [Markets and Prices Review] (1983–1995); Euro Economic Subcommittee – Viet III, Amsterdam (1997)

Đặng Phong (1937–2010) was a Vietnamese economic historian.

Born in Hà Tây Province, Phong graduated from Hanoi University in 1960 then National Economics University in 1964. He then worked as researcher at Vietnam Institute of Economics from 1961 to 2000. He also taught at the Hanoi University of Business and Technology from 1996 to 2009 and was a visiting lecturer to various universities outside Vietnam. Throughout his life, he wrote more than 30 academic works, many of which focus on Vietnam's economic history, its centrally planned economy period and its transition to market economy. He is regarded by some to have been "a living dictionary of Vietnam's economy" and a "top economic historian".

== Early life ==
Đặng Phong was born on November 4, 1937, in Hà Tây. (Note: Some other newspaper articles claim that Phong was born in 1939.) He had a Bachelor of Arts in history at Hanoi University in 1960 and graduated from National Economics University, Planning Faculty in 1964.

== Career ==
Phong worked as an economist specializing in economic history for Vietnam Institute of Economics. He also served as Vice Editor-in-chief of journal Tạp chí Thị trường & Giá cả (Markets and Prices Review) during 1983–1995, collaborator of French National Centre for Scientific Research, Chairman of the Euro Economic Subcommittee – Viet III, Amsterdam in 1997, consultant of Cuban Academy of Sciences. In 1988, State Committee for Markets and Prices assigned him to compete for a scholarship to France, which he won. He spent some time studying at Institut Agricole Méditerranéen in Montpellier.

=== Researching economic history ===
While working on his book Kinh tế thời nguyên thủy ở Việt Nam, his wife sold emptied milk cans to buy champagne, rolls of cotton fabric, chocolate. Đặng Phong then brought these to South Vietnam, selling them to earn living income. Upon Vietnam's reunification in 1975, he conducted research on Vietnam's economic history using the archive left behind by South Vietnam government. This is their researches, plans and strategies on developing agriculture, industry and education which Phong deemed to be detailed and can serve as part of his own post-war development plan for Vietnam.

His book Lịch sử kinh tế Việt Nam was published in 2000, in a review for Lao Động the newspaper, Y Trang considered Đặng Phong so far has been a non-notable historian, attributing the causes to economic history field not being much appreciated. Throughout his life, Phong wrote many books and articles on Vietnam's economic history, economy of South Vietnam, the centrally planned economy period and the transition period to market economy. The book Tư duy Kinh tế Việt Nam was published in 2008, in which Phong presented a systemic arrangement of Vietnam's economic mindset developments during 1975–1989 together with critical documents from the Central Committee. According to Đặng Phong, "economic mindset decides economic policies. Many of Vietnam's ups and downs depend on economic mindset." and the biggest difficulty is lacking research materials. In a review for Lao Động the newspaper, Y Trang described Phong as a "lively and quite contemporary historian".

Having dedicated more than 40 years for academic researching, Đặng Phong is called "a living dictionary of Vietnam's economy". Trần Phương saw Phong as someone with "serious scientific manner", "digging diligently to the roots of the events in order to represent historical events faithfully". Nguyễn Gia Kiểng praised the diversity of documents, "accompanied by accurate and sharp judgments". During the preparation process, Phong collected documents and had access to high-ranking politicians of the state. Economic professor Nguyễn Thị Hiền noted Phong for having "a rich literary mind and a very sharp synthesis ability".

=== Researching history and teaching ===
Phong's book Chuyện Thăng Long – Hà Nội qua một đường phố was published in 2010. It is a research on Lê Duẩn Street in Hanoi, inspired by the book Histoire de Hanoi by French historian Philippe Papin. Writing for Tuổi Trẻ Online, Thu Hà found the familiar "calmness, depth of Đặng Phong's scholarly and commentary style" can still be found in this book, yet in a "softer, more revealing" way. Phong expressed his wish that the book become an anniversary work for the Millennial Anniversary of Hanoi (which was later fulfilled).

Phong taught at Đại học Kinh doanh và Công nghệ Hà Nội (HaNoi University of Business and Technology). He was also visiting lecturer at University of Aix-en-Provence (2007), University of Cambridge (2005), University of Macquarie, Sydney (1996, 2000), The Australian National University (1994), University of Irvine California (1994). After being called "professor" by Vietnamese media multiple times, Phong clarified in 2017 that he is not a professor and has never been granted professor title.

== Family and death ==
Phong's brother is Đặng Vũ. His daughter is Đặng Lê Chi.

Đặng Phong died of illness on August 20, 2010. In December 2010, Chuyện Thăng Long – Hà Nội qua một đường phố was launched on 100th day in memoriam of him. Prior to his death, he expressed his desire to write a book series about economic history and economic mindset of Vietnam with other Vietnamese economic historians.

== Legacy ==
One year after his death, Phan Châu Trinh Culture Foundation, Tri Thức Publishing House and Vietnam Institute for Economic & Policy Research co-organized a talk show in memory of Phong. The talk show affirms his contributions to the economic history research field and confirms that his influence will continue to spread to younger academic generations.

== Bibliography ==
Phong dedicated more than 40 years of his life on researching. Many of his works are published as physical books, while many other are preserved.

- Kinh tế thời nguyên thủy ở Việt Nam (The Primitive Economy in Vietnam), NXB Khoa học Xã hội, 1970 OCLC 23575125
- 21 năm viện trợ Mỹ ở Việt Nam (Twenty-One Years of American Aid in (South) Vietnam), NXB Thông Tin, 1991 OCLC 24008889
- Thị trường và giá cả Việt Nam từ thế kỷ XIX đến nay: Đề tài nghiên cứu khoa học cấp bộ (Markets and prices in Vietnam from nineteenth century to now). Hanoi: Viện Nghiên cứu Khoa học thị trường và giá cả, 1992 OCLC 41626719
- Authority relations and economic decision-making in Vietnam: an historical perspective (co-authored with Melanie Beresford), Copenhagen: Nordic Institute of Asian Studies, 1998 OCLC 39950059
- Economic Transition in Vietnam: Aid and Trade in the Demise of a Centrally Planned Economy (co-authored with Melanie Beresford). Cheltenham, UK and Northampton MA, US: Edward Elgar, 2000 OCLC 263616259
- Lịch sử kinh tế Việt Nam 1945–2000, tập 1 1945–1954 (Economic History of Vietnam 1945–2000, Vol. 1: 1945-1954). Hanoi: NXB Khoa học Xã hội, 2002 OCLC 51487572
- Lịch sử Ngân hàng Ngoại thương Việt Nam 1963–2003 (History of Vietcombank 1963–2003), 2003
- So sánh đổi mới kinh tế Việt Nam và cải cách kinh tế Trung Quốc (Comparison of Economic Reform Between China and Vietnam) (co-authored), 2003
- Kinh tế miền Nam thời kỳ 1955–1975 (Economy of the South 1955–1975). Hanoi: NXB Khoa học Xã hội, 2004 OCLC 646258688
- Lịch sử kinh tế Việt Nam 1945–2000, tập 2 1955–1975 (Economic History of Vietnam, 1945–2000, Vol. 2: 1955-1975). Hanoi: NXB Khoa học Xã hội, 2005 OCLC 51487572
- Lịch sử kinh tế Việt Nam 1945–2000, tập 3 1975–2000 (Economic History of Vietnam, 1945–2000, Vol. 3: 1975–2000)
- 30 năm Vietcombank thành phố Hồ Chí Minh, 1976-2006 (30 years of Vietcombank Ho Chi Minh City 1976-2006). Hanoi: NXB Chính trị Quốc gia Sự thật, 2006
- Những bước đột phá của An Giang trên con đường đổi mới kinh tế (Break-Through Steps of An Giang on the Way to Reform) (co-authored with Đỗ Hoài Nam), 2006 OCLC 214082245
- Long An – mũi đột phá vào kinh tế thị trường (Long An, a Break-Through into Market Economy) (co-authored with Đỗ Hoài Nam). Hanoi: NXB Khoa học Xã hội, 2007 OCLC 226211412
- Lịch sử Ngân hàng đầu tư và phát triển Việt Nam, 1957-2012: sơ thảo (History of the Vietnam Investment and Development Bank, 1957–2007: draft) (co-authored with Trần Đình Thiên). Hanoi: NXB Chính trị Quốc gia Sự thật), 2007
- Tư duy Kinh tế Việt Nam – Chặng đường gian nan và ngoạn mục 1975–1989 (Vietnam's Economic Mindset: A Daunting and Spectacular Road, 1975–1989), NXB Tri thức, 2008 OCLC 1029736819
- 5 đường mòn Hồ Chí Minh (The Five Ho Chi Minh Trails). NXB Tri thức, 2008 OCLC 940949364
- Tư duy kinh tế Việt Nam 1975–1989 – Nhật ký thời bao cấp (Economic mindset of Vietnam 1975–1989 – Diary of Subsidy Economy period). NXB Tri thức, 2009 OCLC 464762405
- "Phá rào" trong kinh tế vào đêm trước Đổi mới ('Fence breaking' in the Economic Sphere on the Eve of Đổi mới). Hanoi: NXB Tri thức, 2009 OCLC 661069809
- Những mũi đột phá trong kinh tế: thời trước Đổi Mới (Breakthroughs in economy: before Đổi Mới) (co-authored with Đỗ Hoài Nam). Hanoi: NXB Khoa học Xã hội, 2009 OCLC 500802897
- Chuyện Thăng Long – Hà Nội qua một đường phố (Stories of Thăng Long – Ha Noi in a single street), NXB Tri thức, 2010 OCLC 705454735
- Biên niên các sự kiện kinh tế Việt Nam, 1975-2008 (Chronology of economic events of Vietnam 1975-2008) (co-authored with Trần Đình Thiên). Hanoi: NXB Khoa học Xã hội, 2012
- Vietnam: Le moment moderniste (co-authored). Aix-en-Provence: Presses universitaires de Provence, 2017. OCLC 1031979300
- Lịch sử Ngân hàng thương mại cổ phần đầu tư và phát triển Việt Nam, 1957–2017 (History of BIDV, 1957–2017) (co-authored with Trần Đình Thiên). Hanoi: NXB Chính trị Quốc gia Sự thật, 2017. OCLC 1029510857
