= Nga Sơn =

Nga Sơn Xã Nga Sơn
- Commune
- Nga Sơn commune
- Location within Vietnam
- Coordinates: 20°00′27″N 105°58′14″E
- Country: Vietnam
- Region: North Central Coast
- Province: Thanh Hóa
- Time zone: UTC+7 (UTC + 7)

Nga Sơn is a commune (xã) of Thanh Hóa Province, Vietnam.
