= Đinh Xuân Lâm =

Vietnamese historian (1925–2017)

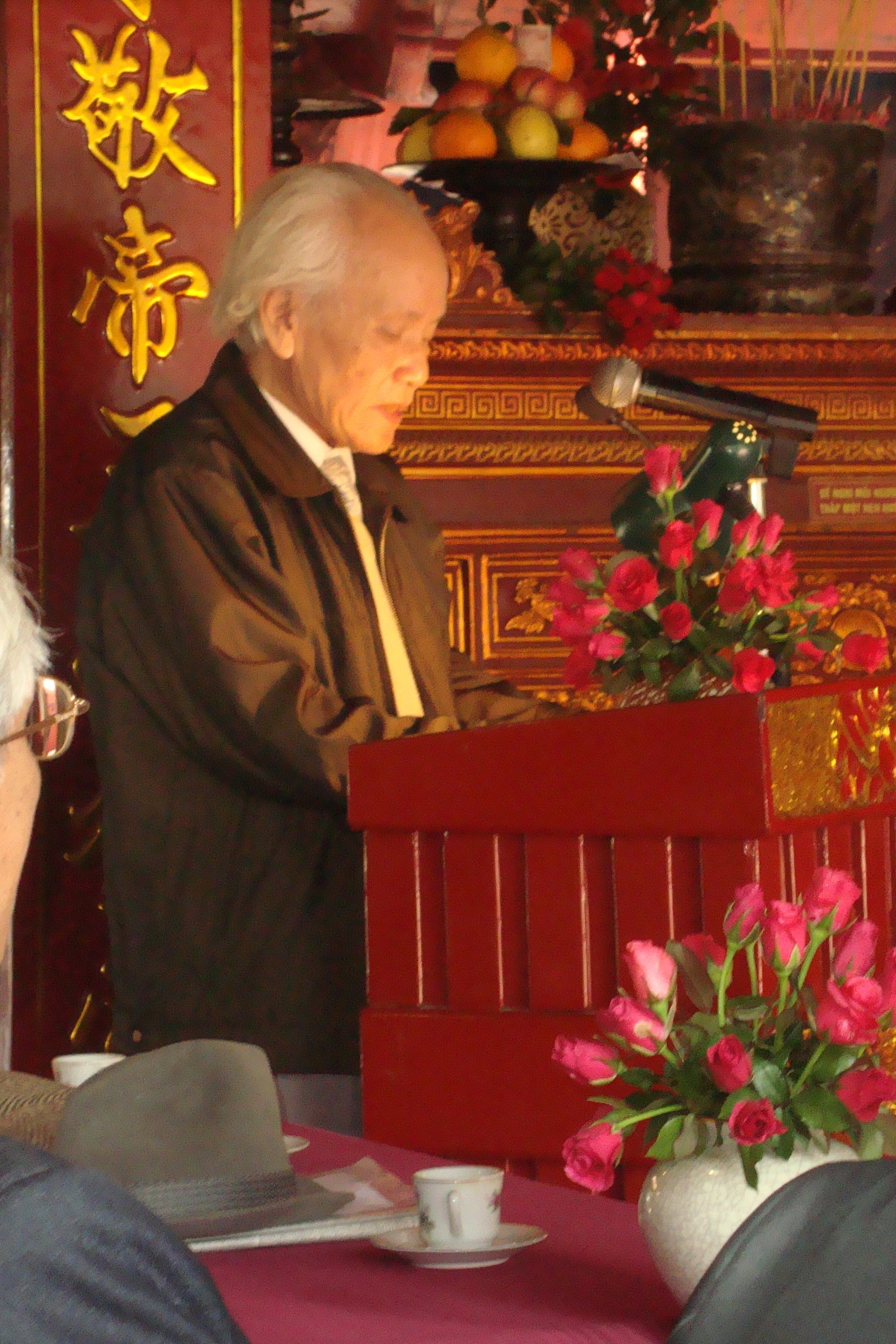
- Đinh Xuân Lâm discussed at Văn Miếu - Quốc Tử Giám
- Born: 4 February 1925; Hương Sơn, Hà Tĩnh
- Died: 25 January 2017 (aged 91); Hà Nội
- Education: Đại học Tổng hợp Hà Nội
- Occupation: Historist

Đinh Xuân Lâm (4 February 1925 – 25 January 2017) helped to build the Department of recent history – modern Vietnam, vice president of the Vietnam History Science courses IV, Chairman of the Scientific Council Center for Information and Documentation UNESCO and history Vietnam culture.

== Biography and career ==
He was born in Sơn Tân, Hương Sơn district, Hà Tĩnh province in a family of Nguyen Dynasty officials.

Since childhood he followed his parents to live and grow up in Thanh Hoa (His father, Tri from Yên Định district), attached to this land as his second home. After parking the General, he attended the National School of Hue and graduated Baccalaureate Philosophy full board literature. After the August Revolution, 1945, he was one of the first high school teacher of Vietnam Democratic Republic.

In 1954, he was transferred straight to 2nd year University of Pedagogy Humanities, fellow with Phan Huy Lê and Tran Quoc Vuong. Excellent graduated, he was retained as lecturers Department of History University of Hanoi.

Under the tutelage of Mr. Tran Van Giau, he has helped to build the Department of recent history – modern Vietnam. Here he has researched and compiled the curriculum as Vietnam History 1897–1914 (1957), Hoang Hoa Tham and Yen peasant movement (1958), History of modern Vietnam (1959–1961).

Professor Lam has successfully guided 30 doctoral dissertations and abroad, the author of over 200 scientific research projects.

== Awarded ==
He was promoted to Associate Professor in 1980 and Professor in 1984, branches of history. Together with Professor Nguyen Lan, he was one of the first two branches Using the State Vietnam honor conferred People's Teacher and was awarded the Medal labor class.

== Selected works ==
Professor Đinh Xuân Lâm wrote and named more than 370 articles, 7 scientific research projects and 90 titles. Some of his works are:

- The book A General History Vietnam (Dinh Xuan Lam editor)
- Symposium Characteristics of French colonialism in Indochina
- The history of Vietnam 1897–1914 '(1957)
- Hoàng Hoa Thám and Yên Thế peasant movement (1958)
- History of modern Vietnam (1959–1961)
- Tonkin Free School Literature;
- Cultural Celebrities of Hồ Chí Minh (Uncle Ho)

== Death ==
He died in Hanoi, Vietnam at the age of 91.
