= Diocese of Nha Trang =

Roman Catholic diocese in Vietnam

Coordinates: 12.2470°N 109.1881°E

Diocese of Nha Trang Dioecesis Nhatrangensis Giáo Phận Nha Trang

Catholic
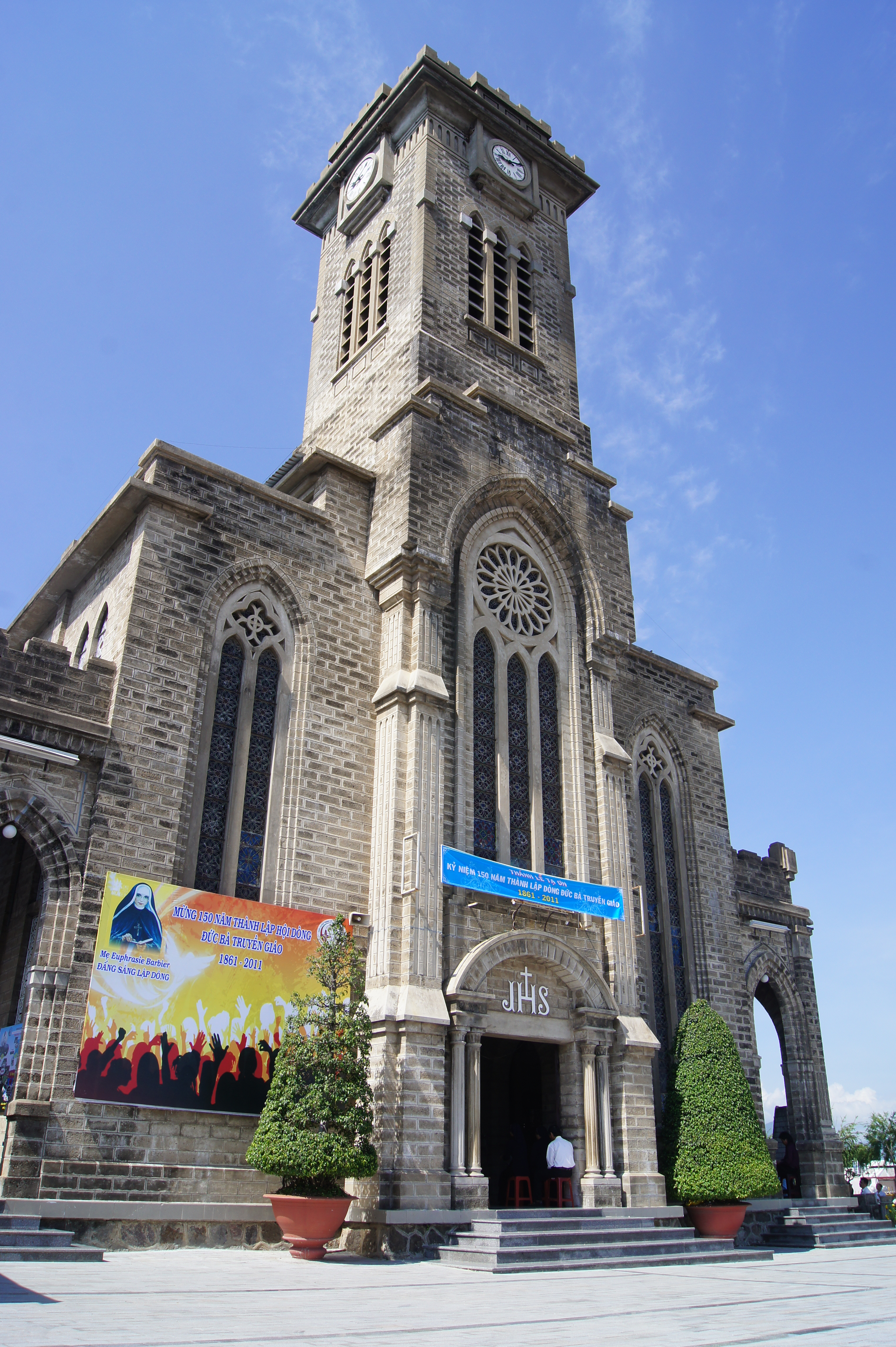
- Christ the King Cathedral

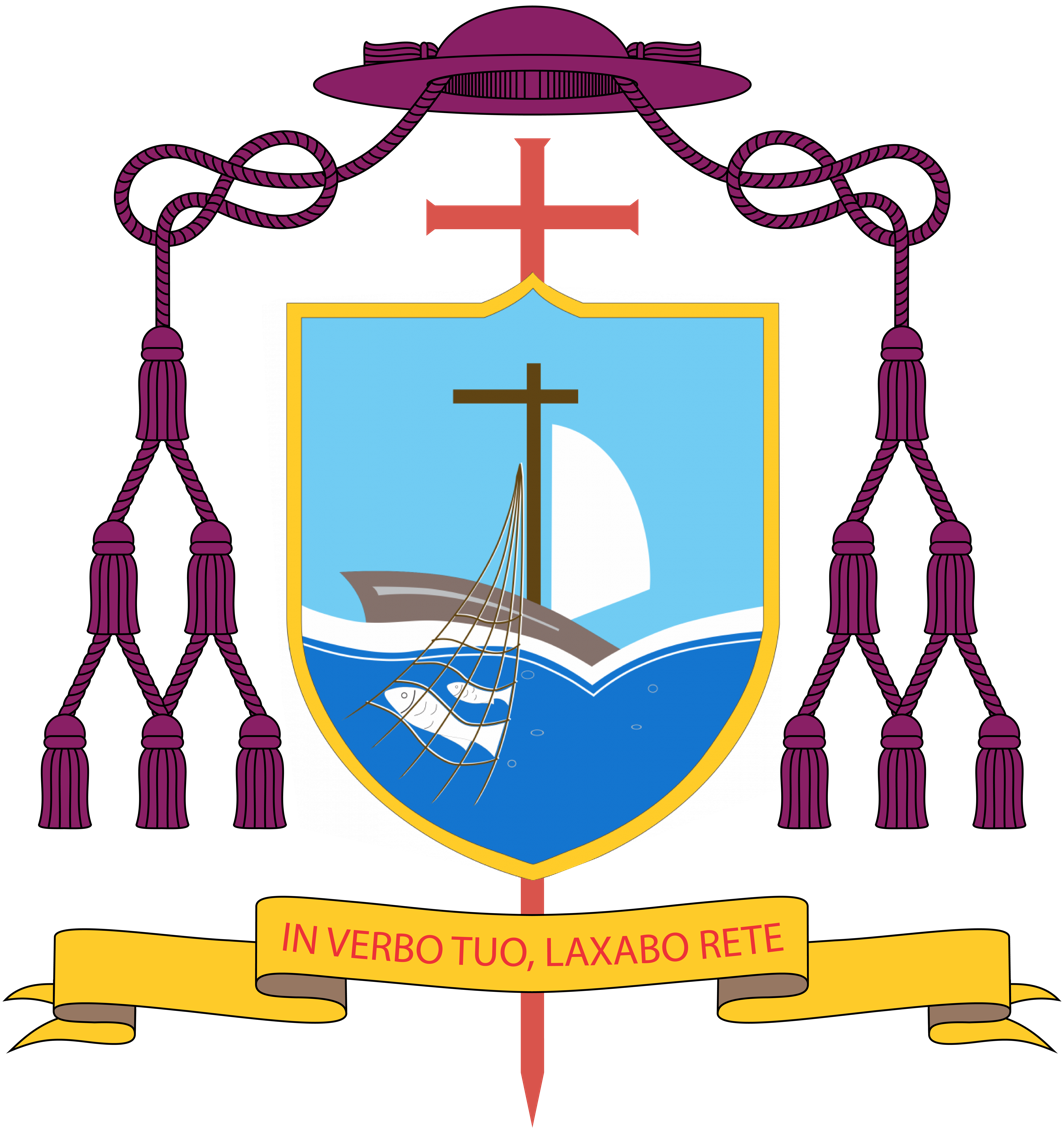
- Coat of arms of Bishop Joseph Huỳnh Văn Sỹ

Location
- Country: Vietnam
- Ecclesiastical province: Huế
- Metropolitan: Huế

Statistics
- Area: 9,486 km^{2} (3,663 sq mi)
- Population: Total; Catholics: (as of 2022); 1,930,000; 230,000 (11.9%)
- Parishes: 90

Information
- Denomination: Roman Catholic
- Sui iuris church: Latin Church
- Rite: Roman Rite
- Established: July 05, 1957 (as Vicariate Apostolic of Nha Trang); November 24, 1960 (as Diocese of Nha Trang)
- Cathedral: Cathedral of Christ the King
- Patron saint: Immaculate Conception

Current leadership
- Pope: Leo XIV
- Bishop: Joseph Huỳnh Văn Sỹ
- Metropolitan Archbishop: Joseph Ðặng Ðức Ngân
- Bishops emeritus: Joseph Võ Đức Minh

Website
- giaophannhatrang.org

The Roman Catholic Diocese of Nha Trang (Latin: Dioecesis Nhatrangensis) covers an area of 9,486 km² in the Provinces of Ninh Thuan and Khanh Hoa in Vietnam and is a suffragan diocese of the Archdiocese of Huế. The creation of the diocese in present form was declared November 24, 1960.

By 2013, the diocese of Nha Trang had about 200,385 Catholics (11.2% of the population), 191 priests and 90 parishes.

Christ the King Cathedral in Nha Trang has been assigned as the Cathedral of the diocese.

== Ordinaries ==
=== Vicar Apostolic of Nha Trang (1957-1960) ===
Vicar Apostolic		Period in office	Status	Reference
1	Bishop Paul-Raymond-Marie-Marcel Piquet, M.E.P.	July 05, 1957 – November 24, 1960	Remained as Bishop of Nha Trang.	

=== Bishops of Nha Trang (1960-present) ===
Bishop		Coat of Arms	Period in office	Status	Reference
1	Bishop Paul-Raymond-Marie-Marcel Piquet, M.E.P.		November 24, 1960 – July 03, 1966	Died in office	
2	Bishop François Xavier Nguyễn Văn Thuận		April 13, 1967 – April 24, 1975	Transferred to Thành-Phô Hô Chí Minh.	
3	Bishop Paul Nguyễn Văn Hoà		April 25, 1975 – December 04, 2009	Resigned	
4	Bishop Joseph Võ Ðức Minh		December 04, 2009 – May 01, 2023	Resigned	
–	Archbishop Joseph Nguyễn Chí Linh		July 23, 2022 – May 01, 2023	Apostolic Administrator	
5	Bishop Joseph Huỳnh Văn Sỹ		May 01, 2023 – present	Current bishop	

Coadjutor Bishops of Nha Trang (1997-2009)

Coadjutor Bishop		Coat of arms	Period in office	Reference
1	Bishop Pierre Nguyễn Văn Nhỏ		April 21, 1997 – May 21, 2003	
2	Bishop Joseph Võ Ðức Minh		November 08, 2008 – December 04, 2009	
