= Nguyễn Trường Tô =

Communist Party politician

Nguyễn Trường Tô (born 1953 in Thai Binh province, northern Vietnam) is a Vietnamese politician. He is currently the party chief, Chairman of the People's Committee of northern Ha Giang province, full member of the Central Committee of the Communist Party of Vietnam. Prior to being appointed as party chief of Ha Giang province, he also held a position of province Department of Planning and Investment.

He acquired an advanced degree in politics with 26-year-experience in Vietnam political system.

== Sexual intercourse with adolescents ==
He is notorious for a recent scandal for allegedly having sexual intercourse with some senior high school students in Viet Vinh High School, Ha Giang Province.

According to this, on 7 July 2010 the Central Inspection Committee of Vietnam Communist Party proclaimed that he, as a province party chief, has failed to achieve an emblematic standard of conduct, severely transgressing the bounds of morality, degrading the Vietnam Communist Party's reputation, and triggering resenting repercussions in the society. Currently, the committee is vigorously urging the Communist Secretary Commission to remove him from the post of province party chief and Chairman of the People's Committee.
