= Murder of Lê Hoàng Hùng =

2011 murder in Tân An, Vietnam

Murder of Le Hoang Hung
- Date: 29 January 2011
- Location: Tân An, Long An Province, Vietnam
- Participants: Tran Thi Lieu (wife)
- Outcome: Death of victim
- Deaths: Lê Hoàng Hung
- Suspects: Tran Thi Lieu
- Charges: Murder

Lê Hoàng Hùng (1960 – 29 January 2011), a Vietnamese investigative journalist, worked for Người Lao Động (The Worker) in Tân An, Vietnam, where he covered corruption and crime. He was burned to death by his wife.

Initially, because of his high-profile reporting and the original story told by Hung's wife about his death, police and organizations concerned with press safety believed Hung had been killed in revenge for stories he had recently published. While his wife Tran Thi Thuy Lieu originally claimed "a stranger broke into their house" and burned her husband, she later recanted and admitted guilt.

The last journalist to have been killed in Vietnam for his journalism was Duong Hung Cuong in 1988. When the Committee to Protect Journalists listed Hung as a "motive confirmed" case after his death, this would have made Hung the first journalist who would have been killed as a result of reporting in Vietnam in 23 years, except it was learned later that he was killed by his wife for a non-reporting motive.

== Death ==
Lê Hoàng Hung was burned in his bed and taken to the Long An General Hospital in southern Long An, Vietnam. Hung suffered from severe burns on over 20 percent of his body. Because of the severity of his burns, he was transferred to Cho Ray Hospital in Ho Chi Minh City. He died on January 29, which was ten days after the attack from his burns. Just before his death, Hung told investigators that he was sleeping when he felt someone pouring something cold on his body which immediately started to burn.

Tran Thi Thuy Lieu, Hung's wife, said that an unknown assailant had broken into Hung's house in Tân An, Vietnam, in the middle of the night, doused the reporter with some sort of chemicals, and set Hung on fire. She told authorities that Hung had received several threatening text messages before the incident. Initially the Committee to Protect Journalists and Reporters Without Borders reported that Hung had been killed for his reporting of misconduct in the Mekong Delta region, and police also thought someone was getting revenge. A rope was found hanging from the second story where Hung was burnt, indicating that the culprit could have climbed up on that rope. However, police confirmed that the rope is just a ploy to distract investigators. The police said that it is very difficult to attach the rope to the second-floor balcony from the ground floor without an insider's help. Also according to the newspaper, there was no evidence showing the rope had been climbed on. It was also regarded as suspicious that Hung went to sleep that night alone without closing the main door or the windows although the night was very cold.

== Context ==
Murder of Le Hoang Hung
- Tân An (Vietnam)
- Location: Tân An, Long An, Vietnam
- Date: 29 January 2011
- Deaths: 1
- Perpetrator: 1

A photograph of Hung's torched bed was published in Vietnam shortly after his death and created public awareness about the journalist's death.

Fatal attacks against journalists in Vietnam have been rare. Most journalists who had died in Vietnam had died covering the Vietnam War, such as Larry Burrows or Dickey Chapelle. The last foreign journalist to be killed in Vietnam was in 1979 when Japanese journalist Isao Takano was shot near the Vietnam-Chinese border in Lạng Sơn. The last case of a Vietnamese journalist having been murdered on account of duties was Duong Hung Cuong in 1988 while he was being held by authorities.

== Impact ==
Investigative journalists, like Hung, have been important in changing the media culture of Vietnam, which has allowed government corruption to be exposed. Hung had to write about sensitive issues in a country where media are state owned, the media support the government in a communist press model, and journalists face restrictions.

While the killing of journalists seldom happens in Vietnam, Reporters Without Borders ranked Vietnam 165 of 178 countries on press freedom in 2010. Hung's colleagues in Vietnam had called for an investigation into his death because of his reporting on sensitive issues and police were initially also focused on this motive. This brought international attention to press safety concerns in Vietnam.

The Committee to Protect Journalists has been active in order to make sure that there is no impunity in cases where journalists are murdered. Shawn Crispin, CPJ's senior Southeast Asia representative, said shortly after his death, "The government signaled its commitment to protecting journalists in a media decree earlier this month and until this crime is solved that commitment will have gone unfulfilled."

Irina Bokova, director-general of UNESCO, issued the following statement shortly after his death:"I condemn the brutal attack on Le Hoang Hung that caused his death. Freedom of expression is a key ingredient of democratic societies, vital to the rule of law, and it must be protected. Le Hoang Hung’s death must be fully investigated and his attacker brought to justice."

Police investigated the murder and even reopened the case later after the wife had already admitted to the killing after inconsistencies between the confession and the evidence were noticed. The result of the further investigation was reported in October by Tuổi Trẻ news that police believe that Lieu had acted alone.

== Tran Thi Lieu ==
BBC News reported on 23 February 2011, Tran Thi Lieu, who was 40 years old, was in police custody and authorities had discovered that she had amassed debts of "one billion dong ($47,000, £29,000)" from gambling excursions to Cambodia. Police were conducting an "expanded investigation" to check if anybody else had been involved and were holding Lieu for 4 months beginning 30 June 2011.

Police discovered that Hung's wife Tran Thi Lieu had a gambling problem, Hung and his wife had argued about money and that he had an insurance policy should he be killed. Police confirmed that Lieu did owe VND1 billion (US$51,000) from gambling in Cambodia. A source told Tuoitrenews that she wanted to sell the house to settle the debt but Hung refused. An unconfirmed source told Tuổi Trẻ that the victim had bought a life insurance with a payout of VND1 billion several months before his death. Lieu, as his wife, is of course the main beneficiary. Drivers of taxis and rental cars she used to on her gambling trips to Cambodia said that Lieu carried along VND30-100 million (US$1,500-5,100) in cash per trip. One regular driver even saved her number on his cell phone as "ZKC L.Casino". However, Lieu denied any gambling, insisting she went to casinos only to sell wet cloth tissues to gamblers there. Police found Lieu lied about the gambling. In 2010, she made 22 trips to Cambodia to visit casinos there.

Tran Thi Lieu was convicted of murder with "vile motives" and sentenced to life in prison on 29 March 2012.

== Career ==
Hung was a print reporter for Nguoi Lao Dong (The Worker), where he mostly covered corruption and crime stories. Hung had covered misconduct in the Mekong Delta region. He had recently covered a case about illegal appropriation of land. He reported on a wide variety of topics, including recent critical coverage of the Long An Province Market Control Department and cross-border smuggling issues.
