= Lê Quảng Ba =

Vietnamese military officer who served at Điện Biên Phủ

Major General Lê Quảng Ba

2nd Chairman of the Committee for Ethnic Minorities (Note: Position holder concurrently held the post of Director for the Ethnic Affairs Department, Central Committee of the Communist Party of Vietnam.) Government of Vietnam
- In office 1 January 1960 – 28 February 1977 (Note: 1976 according to the official website of the Ministry.)
- Premier: Phạm Văn Đồng
- Preceded by: Chu Văn Tấn
- Succeeded by: Vũ Lập

1st Commander of the Việt Bắc Military Region
- In office 6 June 1957 – 1959
- Commissar: Chu Văn Tấn
- Preceded by: Post established Chu Văn Tấn (as Commander of the Việt Bắc Inter-Region)
- Succeeded by: Thanh Phong

Personal details
- Born: Đàm Văn Mông; 21 April 1914 Nà Nghiềng, Hà Quảng, Cao Bằng, Tonkin, French Indochina
- Died: March 19, 1988 (aged 73) Hà Nội, Socialist Republic of Vietnam
- Party: Communist Party of Vietnam
- Spouse: Hoàng Thị Đào
- Children: Lê Thị Thanh Hà

Military service
- Allegiance: Democratic Republic of Vietnam and later Vietnam
- Branch/service: (North Vietnam) People's Army of Vietnam
- Years of service: 1941-1959
- Rank: Major General
- Commands: Việt Bắc Military Region; 316th Brigade; Shiwandashan Area Command; Inter-Region 1; Zone 12; Zone Hà Nội; Pác Bó guerrilla team
- Battles/wars: Chinese Civil War; Battle of Shiwandashan; First Indochina War; Autumn-Winter Campaign (1947); Operation Léa; Operation Ceinture; Winter-Spring Campaign (1953-1954); Operation Pollux; Battle of Điện Biên Phủ
- Central institution membership: 1960–1986: 3rd, 4th, 5th National Assembly; 1960–1976: 3rd Central Committee

Lê Quảng Ba (21 April 1914 – 19 March 1988), born Đàm Văn Mông, was a Major General of Tày ethnicity in the People's Army of Vietnam active during the First Indochina War and the first individual of this ethnic group to be promoted to general officer by North Vietnam. He is famous for leading and protecting Hồ Chí Minh on his way back to Vietnam after 3 decades of living overseas.

== Early life ==
=== Political activism ===
From his youth, Ba was one of the leaders of student strikes against the harsh policies of the French and Imperial authorities in his hometown during the early 1930s.

On June 20, 1931, at Phja Nọi cave, Cốc Sâu hamlet, Sóc Giang commune, the first Communist Party cell of Hà Quảng district was established, consisting of three cadres, with Hoàng Tô as Secretary. Immediately after its establishment, the cell focused on building mass organizations, cultivating revolutionary forces, and prioritizing the development of revolutionary bases.

Aware of his responsibilities in the face of the times, the young Lê Quảng Ba actively participated in the Youth Union and was a member of the Youth Union Executive Committee of Hà Quảng district.

From late 1932 to early 1933, Communist Party bases in Sóc Giang and Hòa Mục was strengthened and expanded, with constant attention paid to the work of developing Party members. Lê Quảng Ba, Quý Quân, Thụy Hùng, and Cải Vân were admitted into the Party.

In May 1935, following directives from higher levels, Hà Quảng Party Branch members held a conference to discuss measures to consolidate and develop the Party base; strengthen relations with the Party leadership in Longzhou and the Hòa An District Party Committee. The conference elected the first Executive Committee of the Hà Quảng District Party Committee - Lê Quảng Ba became a member of the Hà Quảng District Party Committee.

=== Experienced revolutionary ===
In the autumn of 1937, the Hà Quảng District Party Committee convened in Lũng Rường, paying particular attention to building a revolutionary base in Lục Khu. At this time, six communes in the Lục Khu region were still being ravaged by bandits from China, who were plundering, killing, and causing immense suffering to the people on both sides of the border. With the agreement of the Cao Bằng Provincial Party Committee, the Hà Quảng District Party Committee sent three key cadres: Hoàng Tô, Hoàng Sâm, and Lê Quảng Ba to the Lục Khu region to establish a base. Ba personally went to every village to mobilize locals in joining the "Anti-Bandit Association" and the "Western Resistance Association". He skillfully fought against bandits, divided them, prevented their criminal acts, while building up revolutionary forces.

In mid-1938, a base was formed with over 60 families along the border of the Lục Khu region ready to nurture, shelter, and protect revolutionaries. The network extended to Pác Bó, reaching as far as Nà Sác.

During the years 1937 - 1940, Ba participated in guerrilla activities in the border regions of Guangxi, Yunnan, and Guizhou, and actively built up the Cao Bằng guerrilla base along the Sino-Vietnamese border. During those years, Lê Quảng Ba met leader Nguyễn Ái Quốc in China. On the spring of the Xinsi year, January 28, 1941, he had the honor of being a member and protector of while guiding the delegation of cadres welcoming Hồ Chí Minh back to Vietnam to directly lead the Vietnamese revolution after 30 years of overseas activities.

In 1941, Lê Quảng Ba together with political commissar Lê Thiết Hùng formed the Pác Bó guerrilla team - the second armed group of Việt Minh. Hoàng Sâm (under the pseudonym "Trần Sơn Hùng") was made his deputy. Ba was a member of the local Provisional Provincial Committee and the Secretary of the Hà Quảng District Committee at the time. He also became famous for peacefully expelling the bandit chief Lỷ Síu and successfully scaring bandit groups from targeting Pác Bó.

In late 1944, Ba, along with key cadres such as Võ Nguyên Giáp and Vũ Anh, went to Nà Sác and received instructions to establish the Vietnamese Propaganda & Liberation Unit. Thus, he was cemented in history as one of the key researchers and planners in this endeavor.

== Wartime officer ==
In late 1944 - 1945, Lê Quảng Ba was a Military Commissioner and a representative of the Việt Minh's regional committee in the Cao-Bắc-Lạng region, with the task of resolving local conflicts. Prior to the August Revolution, implementing the policy of expanding the revolutionary base area, Ba directly commanded an armed Propaganda unit (consisting of 54 personnel) to advance westward to Hà Giang to develop a mass base, creating opportunities for a general uprising.

After the August Revolution, he was entrusted with many important responsibilities in complex areas such as: Deputy Commander of Zone 1, Commander of Zone Hà Nội, Commander of Zone 12 (including the provinces of Bắc Ninh, Bắc Giang, Lạng Sơn, Quảng Ninh), Deputy Commander of the 2nd Front (Northeast), Commander of the Coastal-Northeastern Front, Commander of Inter-Region 1 and later the Việt Bắc Inter-Region and chief of the Việt Minh contingent in the Shiwandashan campaign. When army brigades were first established, Lê Quảng Ba was one of the first brigade commanders of the Vietnam People's Army (Commander of the 316th Brigade).

Areas under the influence of Zone 12 oversaw some fighting during Operation Léa and Operation Ceinture, including a famous victory at Bông Lau Pass and attacks on Lạng Thương Prefecture. Zone 1 and Zone 12 was then merged into Inter-Region 1.

=== On service to China ===
He was Hồ Chí Minh's personal envoy to the Lu Han group regarding issues surrounding "overseas Chinese" during the Chinese disarmament of Japan in North Vietnam. When Hồ traveled to France for the Fontainebleau Conference in 1946, it was Ba, then Commander of Zone Hà Nội, who led the delegation bidding farewell to him on 31 May.

Late into the Chinese Civil War, Zhou Enlai dispatched general Zhuang Tian (Note: Chinese: 庄田; pinyin: Zhuāng Tián; Wade-Giles: Chuang¹ T’ien²; Vietnamese: Trang Điền) to Việt Bắc to discuss mutual cooperation with the Vietnamese leadership in expelling Kuomintang remnants from Southern China, with special emphasis on the Dian-Yue-Gui area. Subsequently, a joint command was established: Lê Quảng Ba will serve as the commander; while a PLA officer named Chen Mingjiang will be the forces political commissar. The Command was designated as the Shiwandashan Area Command.

In early June 1949, Vietnamese troops set out in two directions: one from Cao Bằng and Lạng Sơn province, crossing the border into the Longzhou area; the other from Lạng Sơn and Hải Ninh (now Quảng Ninh province) to the Qinzhou and Fangcheng areas.

Before the delegation departed for Shiwandashan to assist their Chinese allies, in May 1949, Chairman Hồ Chí Minh gave commander Ba a short instruction: "Cautiousness, secrecy, unity, friendship, victory."

Five Kuomintang regiments were routed, helping the People's Republic of China gain control over a vast area including Longzhou, Ningming, Pingxiang, Fangcheng, Dongxing, Qinzhou, etc. Using this experience, Lê Quảng Ba, along with the army and people of Cao Bằng, promptly crushed large remnants of the Kuomintang army when they tried to cross the border into Vietnam in October 1949.

In late December 1950, Wei Xiuying, the Kuomintang-appointed Commander-in-Chief of the "Yue-Gui Border Region People's National Salvation Army", was located through intelligence channels and eliminated in Nahou Village, Dalü Town, Fangcheng. The Shiwandashan Area Command summarized the campaign with the assessment: "The military victory was important, but [we consider] the political victory far greater."

In a report dated 2 July 1951, the CIA noted:

The DRV has now completed the organization of a new division (Note: Brigade) with troops of the Địa Phương (local units) regiments. This force, which has been designated as the 306 Division, (Note: Presumably a misinterpretation of "316th Brigade".) is commanded by Lê Quảng Ba and is now stationed at Dinh Bang, Thai Nguyen Province [sic]. (Note: Seems to be referring to Đình Bằng Cầu, Thái Nguyên.) Lê Quảng Ba recently returned to Vietnam from combat against Chinese Nationalist guerrillas in Guangxi and Guizhou.

=== Against French forces ===
On 20 August 1952, the CIA named "Lt. Colonel [...] Ba" (Note: In fact, Ba was already a Colonel after 1948.) as "a member of the DRV General Staff..." This information is consistent with reports dating back from 2 February 1952.

During the First Indochina War, Lê Quảng Ba was assigned to lead the newly formed 316th Brigade in 1951. A third of his brigade, including troops and weaponry, participated in the Upper Laos Campaign, where Việt Minh forces succeeded in taking Phongsali and Xam Neua while the rest conducted an attack on Nà Sản.

The loss of Upper Laos forced the French to withdraw from Nà Sản and abandoned their plan of linking up Xam Neua with Lai Châu and Nà Sản, extending down to Trấn Ninh, forming a continuous chain of fortified positions, a military corridor separating Laos and Vietnam, overseeing both Upper Laos and Northwestern Vietnam. Control over Mộc Châu and the province of Sơn La was fully ceded to the 316th. Yet, the threat that commandos belonging to the GCMA posed to Việt Minh convoys still bothered Võ Nguyên Giáp. He seek to cancel out his prior defeat at Nà Sản by taking Lai Châu, a more modestly fortified post within reach of his forces. On the opposite side, René Cogny was planning to recover the French and indigenous troops stationed there.

In November 1953, the French command decided on evacuating the partisan forces of Lai Châu to Điện Biên Phủ. To this end, an evacuation known as "Operation Pollux" was initiated to relocate the 1st Thaï Partisan Mobile Group. The Thaïs, having to march through long stretches of jungle under pro-Việt Minh control, suffered heavy casualties on the journey to their new battlefield. They were harassed by elements of the 316th Brigade and the 148th Regiment. Attempts to connect with this group from Điện Biên Phủ resulted in failure, but their remnants would later participate in the battle. Lê Quảng Ba and his force occupied Lai Châu - which created a solid rear in the Northwest..

In the Battle of Điện Biên Phủ, then Colonel Ba commanded the 316th Brigade in besieging and attacking the Eliane Strongpoints of the French's Central Position. (Note: Vietnamese: Phân khu Trung tâm - Mường Thanh.) Next in command were Commissar Chu Huy Mân and Chief of Staff Vũ Lập.

After 1954, he became the Commander of Việt Bắc Military Region by decree on 6 June 1957. Thanh Phong was designated his deputy and Chu Văn Tấn the political commissar.

== Later life ==
In January 1960, Ba retired to civilian life. It is presumed that his deputy, Thanh Phong, succeeded him in the role of Commander of the Việt Bắc Military Region.

An August 1, 1975 report from the CIA listed Lê Quảng Ba as a standing member of the Vietnamese Communist Party's Central Committee, elected in 1960, and as head of the "State Nationalities Commission". He also served as Deputy Director of the Agricultural Committee within the Party Central Committee. The retired general maintained membership in the National Assembly and the Presidium of the Central Committee of the Vietnamese Fatherland Front.

Ba passed away in March 19, 1988. Part of the eulogy delivered by the Party Central Committee's Executive Committee read:

Comrade Lê Quảng Ba’s life was one of continuous struggle and sacrifice for independence and freedom… He was one of the cadres trained, educated, and intimately trusted by Uncle Hồ, entrusted with many important tasks by the Party and the State, and beloved by people of all ethnic groups throughout the country.

== Decorations ==
Major General Lê Quảng Ba's decorations included:

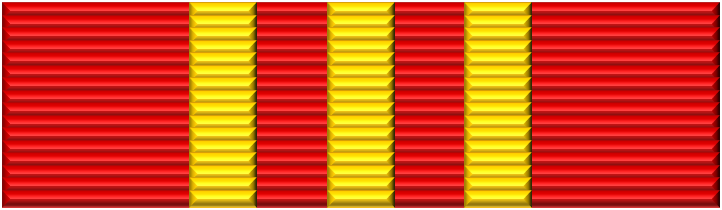

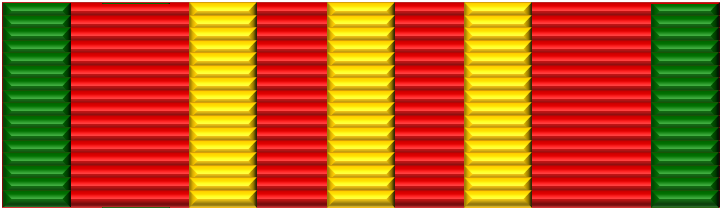

Order of Ho Chi Minh	Resolution for Victory Order; First class

...along with many other prestigious orders and medals, according to author Kiều Mai Sơn.

== Dates of rank ==
Lê Quảng Ba's dates of rank were:

Insignia	Rank	Component	Date
	Colonel	Ground Force	1948
	Major General	Ground Force	1958
