= List of Viet Minh field-grade officers in the First Indochina War =

== Vietnamese officers ==
=== Bế Giang Hà ===
Bế Giang Hà (1919 - ?), a native of Cao Bằng province, came from a family of revolutionary traditions. His father was killed by Chiang Kai-shek’s army after 1945 and his father-in-law, a local village chief, provided for and hid cadres. During the First Indochina War, Hà served as Political Commissar of Group 83 (Vietnamese Volunteer Army), the first unit to go to Laos to fight as part of the Indochinese trilateral alliance against France in 1949. This armed group, stationed at Vientiane, was equivalent to a regiment. With the signing of the Genève Accords, Bế Giang Hà was transferred to the post of Chief of Office for the Ethnic Affairs Department, Central Party Committee.

=== Đào Việt Hưng ===
Đào Việt Hưng, born Lê Giang, was a PAVN officer during the First Indochina War. He was the Deputy Political Commissar for the Vietnamese Volunteer Army at Upper Laos. He was awarded the First-Class Order of Resolution for Victory in 1959.

=== Đỗ Chính ===
Đỗ Chính (1926 - 18 February 1994), born Đỗ Đình Ân, was a Vietnamese politician from the Văn Phúc commune, Mỹ Hào district, Hưng Yên province. Born into a poor peasant family, he had to become self-reliant early on. As a teenager, he moved to Hà Nội for work and to further his education. During the anti-Japanese national liberation movement, this poor but ambitious young man joined the Youth National Salvation Movement in Zone 3, Hà Nội. He was elected to the Executive Committee of the Zone's Youth Union and organized activities in the area. Due to alleged disturbances and sabotage from the Vietnamese Kuomintang in Phú Thọ province, the Phú Thọ Provincial Việt Minh Committee request reinforcements. Đỗ Chính was assigned to Phú Thọ in January 1946, participating in the district Việt Minh committees of Phù Ninh and Thanh Ba districts. In December 1946, he was admitted to the Indochinese Communist Party. He later served as Chairman of the Resistance Administrative Committee and concurrently as Secretary of the Thanh Thuỷ District Party Committee in Phú Thọ province. In August 1947, he transferred to work in the province, joining the Provincial Party Committee, serving as its Director of Office, then being appointed to the Provincial Party Standing Committee, Director of the Organization Department, and Director of the Inspection Department of the Phú Thọ Provincial Party Committee. From September 1949, he participated in the Party Affairs Committee of Zone 10 and then the Việt Bắc Inter-Region. In mid-1950, the organization reassigned him to the border province of Hải Ninh (now Quảng Ninh), where he served as Deputy Secretary and then Secretary of the Provincial Party Committee, concurrently Political Officer of the Hải Ninh Provincial Force. After the Genève Conference in 1954, he was selected as Chairman of the Hải Ninh Provincial Military & Political Committee in preparation for the takeover. In October 1955, he joined the Land Reform Group in Ninh Bình province.

Throughout this early phase in his career, Chính was always present in the hotspots of conflict concerning the Vietnamese Kuomintang Party, bandits, and remnants of Chiang Kai-shek's army seeking refuge across the Sino-Vietnamese border. Being a studious person, he always devoted time to studying politics, culture, learning Cantonese and other languages of the ethnic minorities in the areas where he worked.

He was then transferred to the military in the capacity of Political Officer for the 2nd Battalion under Group 40 of the Supreme Command, Deputy Director of the Political Section in the 332nd Regiment (Northeastern Military Region), and then Political Commissar of the 248th Regiment (Left Bank Military Region). From March 1959 to May 1961, he returned to civic duties as Deputy Secretary of the Provincial Party Committee and directly as Director of the Provincial Party Committee's Organization Department in Hải Ninh. In June 1961, Chính was transferred to Hải Phòng, becoming a standing member of the Municipal Party Committee, serving as Vice Chairman of the Administrative Committee and concurrently Director of the Municipal Planning Committee.

Under threats of the Vietnam War turning “hot” in the mid 1960s, he returned to the military in the post of Political Commissar of the 350th Command, a combined armed group consisting of the 350th Division and the Hải Phòng Municipal Force. Although serving in the military, Đỗ Chính still participated in the Standing Committee of the Municipal Party Committee and served as a member of the Hải Phòng Municipal Administrative Committee to facilitate the coordination of combat and production activities supporting the war effort. In particular, when the Hải Phòng Port's operations failed to keep pace with cargo handling, the Party assigned him to concurrently take the position of Secretary of the Port District Party Committee to resolve difficulties and ensure timely cargo release for combat, production, and battlefield support.

After 1975, Chính was elected Deputy Secretary and Chairman of the People's Committee of the city, and served as Chairman from August 1976 to May 1978. During this time, the Municipal Party Committee sometimes assigned him to directly serve as Chairman of the Agricultural Committee - a pilot model for managing the agricultural sector proposed by Hải Phòng and approved by the Central Party Committee. Chính devoted much effort and dedication to both directing production and building this pilot management model. At the 4th Party Congress (December 1976), he was elected as an alternate member of the Party Central Committee, and appointed Minister of Fisheries and concurrently Secretary of the Party Cadre Committee. In 1981, Đỗ Chính held the position of Director of the Central Party Planning and Finance Committee; he was re-elected as a standing member of the Central Committee of the Party for the 5th session (March 1982), 6th session (1986), and 7th session (December 1991); and a National Assembly delegate for the 6th session (1981-1986). He was entrusted with many important responsibilities: Deputy Director and then Head of the Vietnamese experts delegation in Cambodia (from 1984), Director of the Vietnamese Economic Committee, First Deputy Director of the Central Economic Committee, and concurrently Secretary of the Party Committee of the Central Economic Agencies group. During the mid-term of the 7th Party Congress, due to poor health, Chính voluntarily requested to withdraw from the Standing Committee of the Party Central Committee.

Đỗ Chính passed away in Hà Nội on 18 February 1994, and was laid to rest at the Mai Dịch Cemetery. He was awarded the following honors: First-Class Feat Order, First-Class Resistance Order, Second and Third-Class Order of Resolution for Victory, Medal of Labor (Cambodia).

=== Đỗ Huy Rừa ===
Battalion commander Đỗ Huy Rừa in uniform.

Đỗ Huy Rừa (1922 - 8 June 1949) was an early Southern-born field-level officer in the PAVN. At 18, Đỗ Huy Rừa and his family moved to Laos. In Vientiane, he met communists in the overseas Party Cadre Committee, received ideological guidance, and joined the Party at the age of 20. In August 1945, he was assigned the task of establishing a secret base in the village of Xangphine and organizing self-defense groups unilaterally called the "Vientiane's Overseas Vietnamese Liberation Force", with Rừa serving as deputy commander. He commanded several battles, such as destroying a platoon of remnant French troops at the Thadeua bund and eliminating a commando platoon in the Nongpakthop field northwest of Vientiane. In 1946, Rừa and other Vietnamese cadres went to Thailand to purchase weapons and organized an overseas Vietnamese armed group named the "Trần Phú Detachment", where he again became deputy commander.

Afterwards, he returned to Vietnam and was transferred to the position of Deputy Commander of the 99th Regiment in Bến Tre. When Zone 8 decided to establish the 307th Battalion, he was appointed its commander. Rừa led the 307th Battalion to victory in many battles: Song Thuận - Mỹ Tho, Tháp Mười, Mộc Hóa, La Bang... In early June 1949, when the enemy launched a large-scale sweep operation in Đồng Tháp Mười, his battalion was ordered to resist the enemy. Rừa directly commanded the operation at the head of the 931st Company. His troops annihilated nearly an entire enemy company, but 20 soldiers were killed, including battalion commander Đỗ Huy Rừa at Sài Tư, North Mỹ Thành commune, Cai Lậy district, Tiền Giang province. Musician Nguyễn Hữu Trí, then working at Zone 8, composed the song "The 307th Battalion" based on the poem "Cửu Long River" from famous writer Nguyễn Bính. In 1984, Rừa was reburied at the Tiền Giang Provincial Revolutionary Martyrs Cemetery. He was posthumously designated a Hero of the People's Armed Forces.

=== Êban Y Blốk ===
Y Blốk Êban (Note: In this Rade name, Êban is the surname.) (1921 - 13 January 2018) was the first general officer of the PAVN to hail from the Central Highlands. Born in Chư Dluê village, Hoà Xuân commune, Buôn Ma Thuột in a family of seven siblings, he was the youngest son in the family. Y Blốk suffered many hardships, starting with losing his father at the age of 2. At 15, after finishing primary school, he was conscripted by the French into the Blue Belt force, (Note: French: Milicien à ceinture blue) part of the Tirailleurs Indochinois, to serve as a guard at the Buôn Ma Thuột prison. At 20, his mother passed away. Not being allowed to return home to tend to her funeral, he began to resent the colonial authorities. In prison, Y Blốk came into contact with several political prisoners, among them Nguyễn Chí Thanh, and was gradually attracted by revolutionary ideals.

On August 22, 1945, he led a platoon of Blue Belt soldiers in transforming the Trần Trọng Kim government's flag-raising ceremony into a rally supporting the August Revolution and seizing power for the Việt Minh. Y Blốk Êban's actions, under the direction of the Provisional Leadership Committee of Đắk Lắk (Note: Also called “Darlac” in older documents.) province, caught the local government off guard. This first victory brought Y Blốk into the ranks of the Việt Minh, and he joined the Provisional Administrative Committee of Đắk Lắk. From June 1946, he was sent to study at the Quảng Ngãi Military Academy. In November 1946, he was appointed as the commander of an armed unit in hostile territory north of Khánh Hoà, simultaneously searching for routes and building a base among the local population. In December 1947, he was promoted to Commander of the Ma Trang Lơng Battalion. In 1953, he was sent to Việt Bắc to attend the National Conference on Guerrilla Warfare. Upon his return, the Central Party Committee assigned him the task of bringing 20 kg of gold into the Inter-Region. This was an extremely difficult and dangerous mission, but after six months of arduous effort, he successfully transport the gold back to base.

In 1954, Inter-Region 5’s original plan was for Y Blốk to “lurk” within hostile territory, but then Commander of Inter-Region 5, Major General Nguyễn Chánh, vetoed a decision appointing Y Blốk Êban as the Commander of the 120th Regiment and send him to the North for training. There, he met Chairman Hồ, General Võ Nguyên Giáp and received further political training. In 1958, Y Blốk was awarded the rank of Colonel.

In 1960, he returned to the Central Highlands, serving as Deputy Commander and then Acting Commander of the 6th Military Region. In 1974, Y Blốk was promoted to Senior Colonel, Chairman of the Đắk Lắk Military Control Commission. In January 1975, the Politburo and the Central Military Commission decided on Buôn Ma Thuột as the main target of the Central Highlands Campaign. At exactly 2:03 AM on March 10, 1975, along with other military units, Y Blốk Êban led the armed forces of Đắk Lắk province in an attack on Buôn Ma Thuột. By 10:00 AM on March 11, 1975, they had taken complete control of the town, a key victory in deciding the outcome of the campaign. During this period, he was also Deputy Commander of the Central Laos Front and a standing member of the 5th Regional Committee.

After 1975, Y Blốk was elected Deputy Party Secretary and Chairman of the Đắk Lắk Provincial People's Committee. He was a delegate to the 3rd and 4th National Assembly. Y Blốk received his final promotion to the rank of Major General in 1982. After retirement, the general continued to be an important figure in countering FULRO activities. In 2010, Major General Y Blốk Êban was recognized as a Hero of the People’s Armed Forces. He passed away on 13 January 2018 at Village 5, Tân Hoà ward, Buôn Ma Thuột city, Đắk Lắk province. A road was renamed after him in 2024.

=== Hoàng Nam Hải ===
Hoàng Nam Hải (1923 - 5 October 2003), also known as "Trần Đình Tống", was a member of the Vietnamese Propaganda & Liberation Unit who participated in some of the PAVN's first battles, including Phai Khắt - Nà Ngần and at Đồng Mu. He was one of the students sent to study military science at the Nanning branch of the Republic of China Military Academy in 1941. On April 15, 1945, he became an instructor at the Counter-Japanese Military & Political School (now the First Army Academy). This was the initial capital of the Việt Minh in the pre-uprising days, and later, students of this school were quickly dispersed to various localities to seize power for the revolution.

After the August Revolution, Hoàng Nam Hải was first appointed Commander of the 3rd Detachment, then Commander of the Sơn La Regiment (148th Regiment), tasked with the First Western Advance into Laos to block the return of the French. In September 1946, Phùng Thế Tài took over as commander. Hải became the Director of Zone 2's Military & Political School. After nearly six months, he received a new assignment, commanding the 34th Regiment (now 45th Artillery Brigade). From June 1949, he was in charge of the Company Training School of Inter-Region 3 (now the 3rd Military Region's Military School), and then worked at the Military Culture School for 5 years. In 1958, during a medical check, he was deemed unfit to continue serving in the military and was transferred to work at the Central Rural Affairs Committee, headed by General Nguyễn Chí Thanh, and then at the Supreme People's Court from 1960. Before retiring, Hải was serving as Chief Justice at the Criminal Court of the Supreme People's Court (2nd Class Councillor).

On 5 October 2003, Hải passed away at the Friendship Hospital, aged 80, and was buried at Thanh Tước Cemetery, Hà Nội. He was awarded the following honors: Second-Class Order of Independence, Order of Resolution for Victory, Third-Class Glorious Fighter Order, First-Class Resistance Order, 50-Year Party Membership Badge, Commemorative Medal “For a Career in Justice”.

=== Hoàng Siêu Hải ===
Hoàng Siêu Hải (1917 - 1975), born in Nà Toàn village, Đề Thám commune, Hoà An district (now Đề Thám ward, Cao Bằng city, Cao Bằng province), of Tày ethnicity, was the first Commander of the Inter-Region 1 Regiment (predecessor of the 102nd Regiment) and concurrently the Director of Inter-Region 1's Military Operations Committee. It was later renamed the “Capital Regiment” on 12 January 1947, where it distinguished itself in the defense of Hà Nội. He is considered the father of the “chain attack” (Note: Vietnamese: Đánh liên hoàn) tactic in Vietnam.

At the age of 16, Hải was introduced by his cousin, Hoàng Văn Nọn, the first Secretary of the Cao Bằng Provincial Party Committee (later a member of the Central Committee of the Party in its first term, and a delegate to the 7th Congress of the Comintern in the Soviet Union), to the revolutionary movement. The following year, he was admitted to the Indochinese Communist Party (now the Communist Party of Vietnam). In 1941, Hoàng Siêu Hải was sent to study military science at the Liuzhou branch of the Republic of China Military Academy. After three years of study, at the end of 1944, he and his comrades returned to the country to participate in suppressing bandits on the border regions and providing military training for local militia and guerrillas in Cao Bằng province.

After leading the Capital Regiment in a daring and unexpected breakout from encirclement in Hà Nội in 1947 and returning to base, he was transferred by the General Staff to serve as Deputy Commander of the 72nd Regiment. Hải later participated in the Border Campaign (1950), the Midlands Campaign (1951), and the Điện Biên Phủ Campaign (1954). From 1958, he left the army and transferred to the Cao Bằng Provincial Party Committee, working at the Cao Bằng Provincial Farmers' Association until his retirement.

He was offered a return to the military during the Vietnam War but declined on grounds of health. Hoàng Siêu Hải was recognized as a veteran cadre, awarded the Third-Class Order of Independence (posthumously), and the Second-Class Military Exploit Order... He was also known by other names such as Hoàng Khắc Tiệp and Hoàng Giang Từ.

=== Hoàng Thế Dũng ===
Hoàng Thế Dũng (1924 - 19 October 2001) was the Political Commissar of the 102nd Regiment under the 308th Brigade. He was implicated in the infamous “Revisionist - Anti-Party Affair”.

=== Hoàng Thọ ===
Hoàng Thọ in May 1949, Musée de l'Armée (Paris).

=== Hoàng Xuân Tùy ===
Hoàng Xuân Tùy (24 December 1922 - 22 June 2013), born Hoàng Tiêu Diêu, was a Vietnamese officer, educator and politician from Xuân Tùy village, Quảng Phú commune (now Đan Điền commune, Huế). A student at the Civil College of Indochina, he joined the Việt Minh in 1944. In October 1945, he enlisted in the army and was sent to study at the Vietnamese Military & Political School. Tùy was retained as a key cadre and recommended for Party membership by Party Branch Secretary Trần Tử Bình. He was admitted in 1946 while serving as Political Officer in the 7th Class Cadet Platoon. He was introduced by Tố Hữu to work as a secretary for Nguyễn Chí Thanh in Huế. However, since Thanh already had a secretary, he went back to Thanh Hóa. After working there for a while, Tuỳ was transferred to become a political commissar in a Westward Advance battalion. However, just like before, he had to return to Hà Nội because someone else had already taken office.

In early 1947, Tùy went to Việt Bắc and was assigned as Political Commissar of the 23rd Regiment (later the 72nd Regiment). In 1949, the 72nd Regiment was disbanded after the French retreated, and he became Chairman of the Bắc Kạn Provincial Military Control Commission. Hoàng Xuân Tùy was transferred to the post of Political Commissar in the 36th Regiment, and then secretary to General Võ Nguyên Giáp. In 1950, he was made Director of the Political Section and Deputy Commander of the 308th Brigade. From 1951, Tùy headed the Information Office for the People’s Army newspaper, later Director of the Propaganda Department and charge d’affaires of the People's Army newspaper at the Điện Biên Phủ Front, Hoà Bình Campaign and Northwestern Campaign. During this time, he was promoted to Director of the newspaper. In February 1956, he became one of the central figures of the newly established Hà Nội Polytechnic, emerging as vice dean in 1958 and led the school as dean from 1961. In October 1965, he was appointed Deputy Minister of University and Vocational College.

After retirement, Tùy actively participated in social activities and was one of the founders of the Vietnamese Association for the Promotion of Learning and the Hồ Chí Minh Municipal Association for the Relief of Disabled Children. In his later years, Hoàng Xuân Tùy was elected Director of the Liaison Committee for the Old Soldiers of Điện Biên Phủ in Hồ Chí Minh city. He passed away here on 22 June 2013, having been awarded the First-Class Order of Resolution for Victory, the First-Class Resistance Order, the 65-Year Party Membership Badge and the honor of Hero of the People’s Armed Forces.

=== Lý Ban ===
Lý Ban

Lý Ban (10 March 1912 - 30 September 1981), born Bùi Công Quan, also known as “Lý Bích Sơn”, was a senior official of Vietnam from Long Hòa village, Cần Đước ward, Chợ Lớn province. An early follower of patriotic movements in his locale, Ban was introduced to the Vietnamese Revolutionary Youth League by teacher Phạm Văn Đồng. While studying, he actively participated in propaganda and mobilization activities among youth, students, and the overseas Chinese community in Sài Gòn - Chợ Lớn. In 1929, Ban joined the Communist Party of Annam, and in 1930 became a member of the Indochinese Communist Party. He was arrested twice by French police in 1931, but due to lack of evidence, they had to release him and place him under house arrest in his hometown. In 1932, he secretly traveled to Sài Gòn to contact the organization but failed. To avoid being apprehended, Ban boarded a ship to Hong Kong.

In Guangdong, Ban participated in the revolutionary struggle of the Chinese people. In early 1934, he was sent to study at the Party School in the Central Soviet Base Area of Ruijin, Jiangxi. During this time, he diligently studied and systematically absorbed revolutionary theories and experience. High-ranking officials of the Chinese Communist Party such as Zhou Enlai, Dong Biwu, Li Fuchun, Ye Jianying... paid attention to and aided their young Vietnamese student. Here, he was admitted to the Chinese Communist Party, and he met and befriended a revolutionary fighter from Hà Nội named Nguyễn Sơn, then an officer in the Workers and Peasants Red Army. Both would participate in the Long March.

During the march, Lý Ban fell seriously ill and had to stay back at a civilian's house. After recovering from critical conditions, although not fully recovered, he traveled thousands of kilometers alone, evading enemy pursuit, to find his way back to Guangdong and re-establish contact with the organization. During the Second Sino-Japanese War, Ban was elected to the Executive Committee of the Guangdong - Jiangxi - Fujian Inter-Provincial Committee. In this capacity, he made significant contributions to building the armed forces and directing guerrilla warfare, inflicting heavy losses on the Japanese.

In 1945 or early 1946, Ban returned to Vietnam. In Hà Nội, he was assigned to work at the Central Party Office. In 1947, he was chosen to lead the Central Directorate of Overseas Chinese Affairs, then designated Deputy Director of the Political Department of the Vietnamese National Army and Militia on 1 February 1949, contributing to the leadership of units fighting against French colonialism. As cross-border telegraphic connection was poor and the People’s Liberation Army had recently gained control of Beijing in 1949, Chairman Hồ and the Party Central Committee decided to send Ban on a mission to China.

In late April 1949, Ban and a comrade left Việt Bắc, breaking through the French encirclement in Hải Ninh and traveled to Móng Cái. From there, he disguised himself as a merchant and crossed the sea to Fangcheng, bypassing the control of the Kuomintang army, and made his way to the Guangdong Provincial Party Committee's base area. With the help of friendly organizations, the two envoys crossed the front lines and reached Beijing in August 1949. Lý Ban carefully guarded Chairman Hồ Chí Minh's letter throughout the arduous journey and directly delivered it to Premier Zhou Enlai and Deng Yingchao. The two envoys met and worked with the Central Committee of the Chinese Communist Party. Thus, they succeed in laying the first bricks for diplomatic cooperation and mutual assistance between the two parties and states. Shortly thereafter, the People’s Republic of China recognized the Democratic Republic of Vietnam.

In 1952, the CIA ranked him at the Colonel-level. During the First Indochina War, he was in charge of directing Chinese assistance. After peace was restored in the North, he was assigned to the Ministry of Industry and Trade to consolidate the National Bank and build up the Customs industry. In 1958, when the Ministry of Foreign Trade was established, he was appointed Deputy Minister and simultaneously Secretary of the Party Committee. At the Third Congress of the Vietnamese Communist Party, Ban was elected as an alternate member of the Central Executive Committee. On 4 September 1959, he was awarded the First-Class Order of Resolution for Victory. During his time working at the Ministry of Foreign Trade, Lý Ban excellently fulfilled his assigned duties, working with the entire sector to ensure timely import and export activities throughout the Vietnam War.

After April 30, 1975, he returned to his hometown in then Long An province, reuniting with his elderly mother and family members after 43 years of separation. In his capacity as a leading official in the Ministry, Ban actively mobilized cadres from the North to strengthen the development of the Foreign Trade sector in Hồ Chí Minh city and the Southern provinces, creating jobs for tens of thousands of post-war workers and generating export goods to bring foreign currency back to the country. In 1978, Ban retired. On September 30, 1981, he passed away in Hồ Chí Minh city. In 2011, Lý Ban was posthumously conferred the Order of Hồ Chí Minh.

=== Nguyễn Mạnh Quân ===
Nguyễn Mạnh Quân (1923 - 1988), born Nguyễn Thế Minh, was a Senior Colonel of the PAVN from Ninh Khang commune, Gia Khánh district (now Hoa Lư), Ninh Bình province, with permanent residence at Vĩnh Phúc ward, Ba Đình district, Hà Nội. Before 1945, he joined a local National Salvation paramilitary unit. In 1945, he participated in seizing power in Ninh Bình province. After the success of the August Revolution, Quân was admitted to the Indochinese Communist Party and appointed as a commander of the local Liberation Force's platoon. Quân was eventually promoted to Commander of the 46th Regiment, a core unit of Inter-Region 3. After the victory at Điện Biên Phủ, he became Chairman of the Nam Định Military Control Commission. It was the first major city in Tonkin to fall under complete control of the Việt Minh. In October 1954, Quân was designated Chief of Staff of Inter-Region 3.

In May 1969, he became Director of the Military Training Bureau, General Staff Department. As Deputy Commander of the Central Highlands Front (B3), he, along with the Front Command, organized numerous campaigns and directly commanded many battles, eliminating numerous hostile forces throughout the Central Highlands battlefield. Notable examples include the Northern Central Highlands Campaign. At the Battle of Đắk Tô - Tân Cảnh in 1972, Quân was placed in direct command over forces including the 28th Regiment, 66th Regiment, 95th Regiment, 24B Regiment (predecessor of the 10th Division) and local troops in Kon Tum, succeeding in taking over the area. Other sources identified this group as the “10th Division”. This division also included 8 specialized battalions. Following the final military victory in late 1975, he and several cadres from the Military Training Bureau were assigned to participate in the "Summary of the Hồ Chí Minh Campaign" Conference at Đà Lạt.

In 2018, Senior Colonel Nguyễn Mạnh Quân was posthumously recognized as a Hero of the People’s Armed Forces.

=== Nguyễn Thế Truyện ===
Nguyễn Thế Truyện (1928 - 1968), “Truyện the Fifth”, or “Fifth Eyeglasses”, was an officer of the PAVN who participated in the First Indochina War and the Vietnam War. He came from Hải Phòng. During conflicts against the French, he became famous as a flexible commander adept at both storming fortifications (Note: Vietnamese: Đánh công kiên) and maneuver warfare, (Note: Vietnamese: Đánh vận động) rising from a company commander to leading the 302nd Battalion, then considered to be the strongest Việt Minh battalion in the Southeast. Truyện was also remembered for being a local forerunner in special operations. (Note: Vietnamese: Đánh đặc công) His company was famously among the forces that engaged in a fierce battle with 3,000 French troops at Láng Le - Bàu Cò in 1948. Transferred to the North in early 1953, he was sent overseas for military studies, and raised to deputy regimental commander, concurrently chief of staff, stationed at Nà Sản in the Northwest. By the first major wave of rank conferment in 1958, Truyện was awarded the rank of Major. He was placed in command of this regiment at a later date.

Moving South in 1962, he took part in the battles of Ba Gia, Bình Giã, Đồng Xoài, Bàu Bàng, Nhà Đỏ - Bông Trang, Dầu Tiếng, Bàu Cỏ, Bến Cầu, etc., in the role of regimental commander, later Commander of the 5th Factory (Note: Vietnamese: Công trường 5. This type of unit, unique to the Việt Cộng, was considered equivalent to a division.) and Commander of the Northern Forward Command, Sector I, Sài Gòn - Gia Định. In preparation for the Tết Offensive, with the aid of Intelligence Unit A20 and agent Nguyễn Văn Lễ, he disguised himself as a Congressman and personally traveled to the city centre for preliminary reconnaissance. Just before the Second Phase, Truyện was ordered to leave the Forward Command for a meeting at the Regional Command. He was killed by an artillery barrage on the Post shortly after making arrangements with his superior Mai Chí Thọ. In 2010, Senior Colonel Nguyễn Thế Truyện was posthumously recognized as a Hero of the People’s Armed Forces. A road was renamed after him in 2012.

=== Phạm Phú Tiết ===
Dr. Phạm Phú Tiết in civilian clothes.

Phạm Phú Tiết, a grandson of the famous imperial reformer Phạm Phú Thứ, was a valedictorian of his year among the Recommended Graduates. Dr. Tiết rose to the post of Viceroy of Bình Phú (Bình Định and Phú Yên) under the Nguyễn dynasty. During the First Indochina War, he served as Chief Justice for the Military Tribunal of Inter-Region 5 or of the Southern Central region with the rank of Colonel. Another source reported that he was Chief Justice for the Military Tribunal of Southern Vietnam. After 1954, he went North. Dr. Tiết was a standing member of the Fatherland Front’s Central Committee, a Vietnamese opera specialist in the Ministry of Culture and a translator of Hồ Chí Minh’s poetry.

=== Thanh Phong ===
Thanh Phong, born Nguyễn Tri Phương, was an early military officer of the PAVN. He was the Political Officer for the Vietnamese Propaganda & Liberation Unit. In the Shiwandashan Campaign, Vietnam sent a volunteer force led by Lê Quảng Ba to aid China. Phong was designated the Commander of the Longzhou Front, with Chu Huy Mân as First Deputy Commander, concurrently Political Commissar and Hoàng Long Xuyên as Second Deputy Commander. According to Xuyên, Thanh Phong personally issued an order to him in May 1949: “Following a special order from Mr. Văn, (Note: Pseudonym of General Võ Nguyên Giáp) a special operation is being launched to assist our allies. You will be responsible for commanding a detachment. Draw about 2 to 3 companies of local forces from Lạng Sơn. Your responsibility is to attack from Nanguan down to Pingxiang, Shangshi, Xiashi, and then towards Ningming. You will serve as a Deputy Commander of the Longzhou Front and have direct control over this direction. You will meet Mr. Chu Huy Mân’s troops at the capital of Ningming county. Mr. Mân will attack from Shuikou, thrust down to Xiadong, and reunite with you at Ningming.”

On 2 February 1952, the CIA identified Phong as “Special Attaché to […] general Chen Geng” and ranked him at the Colonel-level. Unverified intelligence dated 6 May 1954 labeled Thanh Phong the Commander of the Việt Minh's supposed “North Vietnamese Command”. In early June 1957, Chairman Hồ Chí Minh signed Decree no. 021-SL, appointing “Mr. Thanh Phong, a divisional-level cadre, as Deputy Commander of the Việt Bắc Military Region.” He was a standing member of the Việt Bắc Autonomous Regional Committee and a former Deputy Chief Justice of the Supreme People’s Court. In 2009, Thanh Phong was posthumously awarded the Order of Hồ Chí Minh.

=== Trần Tấn ===
Trần Tấn was a Deputy Director of the Ordnance Bureau and one of the lay judges in the corruption case of Colonel Trần Dụ Châu.

== "New Vietnamese" officers ==
=== Guangbao Huang ===
Huang Guangbao, (Note: Chinese: 黄光保; Wade-Giles: Huang² Kuang¹-pao³; Vietnamese: Hoàng Quang Bảo) according to the CIA, was a "Chinese vice governor of Việt Minh-controlled Hải Ninh Province (later Quảng Ninh), Indochina" who controlled at least 2,000 "Việt Minh Army troops". In early January 1951, these soldiers arrived at Fangcheng.

A CIA report from 31 March 1953, named "Hoàng Mậu Thành" as Vice President of the Hải Ninh Administrative and Resistance Committee. (Note: Equivalent to "Vice Governor") According to the file, Thành is a relative of then-Lieutenant Colonel Vòng A Sáng (Note: Chinese: 黃亞生; Pinyin: Huáng Yàshēng; Standardized Vietnamese: Hoàng Á Sinh) in the Vietnamese National Army, a Hakka man whose ancestry hailed from Huanglanba Township, Fangcheng, Guangxi. Other sources disclosed that Thành was a cousin of Sáng and also a delegate to the 1st National Assembly. In mid-1948, he penned a letter calling on Sáng to "return to the people".

=== Sei Igawa ===
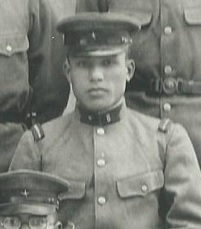
Igawa on his graduation from the Army Academy (1935)

Sei Igawa (Note: Japanese: 井川省) (14 April 1913 - 20 June 1946) or Sei Ikawa, also known as "Lê Chí Ngọ", reportedly a Major, staff officer in the IJA 34th Independent Mixed Brigade. He helped the Việt Minh procure weapons and blocked inspections on their smuggling convoys. In early 1946, Igawa and his former subordinate Mitsunobu Nakahara were assigned by the Central Vietnam Public Security Department to Zone 5 to assist general Nguyễn Sơn, whom he had become an advisor to, in organizing accelerated military training courses in Quảng Ngãi. In 1946, on the Central Highlands front in Pleiku, Igawa, along with a special delegate sent from the Party Central Committee, Đàm Minh Viễn, was on inspection duty when he was killed in a bombing raid by French aircraft. However, Gyousei News reported that he was killed by machine gun fire. He is worshipped in the Yasukuni Shrine.

=== Mukayama ===
Mukayama was described by several sources as a Colonel, member of the IJA 38th Army's General Staff, including Cecil B. Currey in the book "Victory At Any Cost: The Genius of Vietnam's General Vo Nguyen Giap". He joined the Việt Minh after his country's capitulation, directing 1,500 Japanese military personnel within the movement. Philippe Devillers, however, called him "Lieutenant Colonel Mukaiyama". The purported journal of a "Ngô Văn Chiệu" mentioned a "former Lieutenant-Colonel in the General Staff of the 38th Japanese Army" who served in an advisory capacity to the Vietnamese instructor of an early officers' school in Hà Nội. Another work of Christopher Goscha referred to a Japanese account of the "Organization for Collaboration and Mutual Aid for the Independence of Vietnam", headed by a "Lt. Colonel Muraiyama and his adjunct, Major Oshima" following the Hồ-Sainteny Agreement in March 1946. Goscha labeled this Muraiyama "[one of] the officers trained in the Nakano Academy". According to Currey, the Colonel was killed in action in December 1947 at Chợ Chu, Thái Nguyên, by French paratroopers. Mukayama was allegedly a strong supporter of general Giáp, as he'd arranged Vietnamese citizenship and false identification papers for the men.

=== Warakami ===
Warakami, from a report dated 30 September 1952, was supposedly "a Japanese and former battalion commander in the Japanese Army. [Colonel] Warakami is acting as a counselor on strategy and combat method. From 1945 to 1948, he was with the DRV Ministry of Defense. In 1948, he was assigned to [Nguyễn] Sơn's staff and has been with Sơn since that time."
