= Valluy =

Valluy is a French surname. Notable people with the surname include:

- Claude Valluy, Governor of Dahomey from 1949 to 1951
- Jean Etienne Valluy (1899–1970), French general and historian
