= Vũ Lập =

Vietnamese General (1924 – 1987)

Colonel General Vũ Lập

Chief of Committee for Ethnic Minority Affairs
- In office 1976–1979
- Preceded by: Lê Quảng Ba

Personal details
- Born: Nông Văn Phách; 1924 Hòa An, Cao Bằng, Tonkin (French protectorate)
- Died: 1987 (aged 62–63) Việt Nam
- Party: Communist Party of Vietnam

Military service
- Allegiance: Democratic Republic of Vietnam and later Vietnam
- Branch/service: People's Army of Vietnam
- Rank: Colonel General
- Battles/wars: First Indochina War; Battle of Điện Biên Phủ; Laotian Civil War; Campaign 139; Vietnam War; Sino-Vietnamese War

Vũ Lập (born Nông Văn Phách) (1924–1987) was a colonel general in the People's Army of Vietnam (PAVN) active during Laotian Civil War and all three Indochina Wars. He commanded PAVN forces in Campaign 139 in Laotian Civil War, and PAVN Military Region 2 in Sino-Vietnamese War.

== Early years ==
Vũ Lập was born in Cao Bằng province of the Tonkin Protectorate, French Indochina. Joining Vietnamese revolutionary movement since childhood, Vũ Lập was sent to attend military training in Guangxi at age 17, together with Hoàng Văn Thái, Đàm Quang Trung, and Vũ Nam Long in 1941.

== Military career ==
In the Battle of Điện Biên Phủ, Vũ Lập was the chief of staff, together with the commander Lê Quảng Ba and political commissar Chu Huy Mân commanded 316th Brigade besieging, attacking Eliane positions of French Central positions (Vietnamese: phân khu Trung tâm - Mường Thanh).

During the Vietnam war, he was promoted to the rank of major general in 1974, then colonel general in 1984.
