= Ministry of Ethnic and Religious Affairs =

Government ministry of Vietnam

Socialist Republic of Vietnam Ministry of Ethnic and Religious Affairs
- Bộ Dân tộc và Tôn giáo (Vietnamese)

Agency overview
- Formed: 3 May 1946
- Preceding Agency: Department of Ethnic Minority (1946–1955) Central Sub-Committee of Ethnic Minority (1955–1959) Committee of Ethnic Minority (1959–1987) Central Commission of Ethnic Minority of the Communist Party (1979–1992), Office of Mountain Region and Ethnic Minority (1990–1992) Committee for Ethnic Minority and Mountain Region (1992–2002) Committee for Ethnic Minority Affairs (2002–2025)
- Type: Ministry-level Agency
- Jurisdiction: Government of Vietnam
- Headquarters: 349 Đội Cấn Street, Ngọc Hà Ward, Hanoi
- Annual budget: 319.630 millions VND (2018)
- Agency executives: Nguyễn Đình Khang, Minister; Nguyễn Hoài Anh, Deputy Minister; Y Vinh Tơr, Deputy Minister; Y Thông, Deputy Minister; Nông Thị Hà, Deputy Minister; Nguyễn Hải Trung, Deputy Minister
- Website: cema.gov.vn ubdt.gov.vn bdttg.gov.vn moera.gov.vn

The Ministry of Ethnic and Religious Affairs (Vietnamese: Bộ Dân tộc và Tôn giáo, lit. 'Ministry for Ethnicities and Religions'), formerly Committee for Ethnic Minority Affairs (CEMA; Vietnamese: Uỷ ban Dân tộc, lit. 'Ethnic Committee'), is a government ministry in Vietnam that exercises the functions of state management on ethnic and religious affairs nationwide. The ministry is headed by a minister. The Minister of Ethnic and Religious Affairs is Nguyễn Đình Khang, appointed on 8 April 2026.

== Leadership ==
- Minister: Nguyễn Đình Khang, Central Committee member
- Deputy Minister:
  - Nguyễn Hoài Anh, Central Committee member
  - Y Vinh Tơr
  - Y Thông
  - Nông Thị Hà
  - Nguyễn Hải Trung

== List of Ministers ==
No.	Name	Term	Ethnicity	Position
1	Hoàng Văn Phùng	1946–1955	Tày	Director of Ethnic Minorities Department
2	Bùi San	1955–1959	Kinh	Head of the Central Ethnic Minorities Subcommittee
3	Chu Văn Tấn	1959–1960	Nùng	Head of the Central Ethnic Committee, Chairman of the Government Ethnic Committee
4	Lê Quảng Ba	1960–1976	Tày	Head of the Central Ethnic Committee, Chairman of the Government Ethnic Committee
5	Vũ Lập	1976–1979	Tày	Head of the Central Ethnic Committee, Chairman of the Government Ethnic Committee
6	Hoàng Văn Kiểu	1979–1982	Tày	Head of the Central Ethnic Committee, Chairman of the Government Ethnic Committee
7	Hoàng Trường Minh	1982–1989	Tày	Central Ethnic Committee School
8	Nông Đức Mạnh	1989–1992	Tày	Central Ethnic Committee School
9	Hoàng Đức Nghi	1992–2002	Tày	Minister, Chairman of the Committee for Ethnic Minorities and Mountainous Areas
10	Ksor Phước	2002–2007	Jarai	Minister, Chairman of the Ethnic Committee
11	Giàng Seo Phử	2007–2016	Hmong	Minister, Chairman of the Ethnic Committee
12	Đỗ Văn Chiến	2016–2021	Sán Dìu	Minister, Chairman of the Ethnic Committee
13	Hầu A Lềnh	2021–2025	Hmong	Minister, Chairman of the Ethnic Committee
14	Đào Ngọc Dung	2025–2026	Kinh	Minister of Ethnic and Religious Affairs
15	Nguyễn Đình Khang	2026–	Kinh	Minister of Ethnic and Religious Affairs
