= Operation Pollux =

Military Operation

- Location of Lai Chau Province in Vietnam
Date	November 7–22, 1953
Location	Between Lai Châu and Dien Bien Phu, French Indochina
Result	French operational failure
Territorial changes	Viet Minh occupation of Lai Chau

Belligerents
French Union: France; T'ai Federation	Democratic Republic of Vietnam: (North Vietnam) Việt Minh

Commanders and leaders
René Cogny; Đèo Văn Long	Lê Quảng Ba

Strength
~2,100	Elements of the 316th Division

Casualties and losses
~1,900 killed, captured or deserters	Unknown

Operation Pollux was a military operation during the First Indochina War by the French Union forces in northwest Vietnam in November and December 1953 was one of a twin operation, the other being Operation Castor. The names of these operations are based upon the mythological twins, Castor and Pollux. Operation Castor recaptured and then established a fortified airfield in Điện Biên Phu, in the north-west corner of Vietnam. Operation Pollux was the name of the second operation (the evacuation of Lai Châu to Dien Bien Phu), which took place weeks later. These operations were developed by General Navarre who had replaced General Salan as Commander in Chief in early 1953 after the Viet Minh had conducted their successful offensive in the Black River area of northwest Vietnam and then subsequently invaded Laos in April 1953.

== Background ==
Operations Castor and Pollux took place in the T'ai region of Vietnam. This is the home of various ethnic mountain people, called Montagnards – primarily Hmong, Tho, Muong, T'ai, Nung, Yao - not related to the majority Kinh Vietnamese. In the First Indochina War these various mountain people allied themselves with either the Viet Minh or the French. The Tho were essentially aligned with the Viet Minh while the white T'ai were France's chief allies there. (The T'ai were sub-designated as black, red, white, primarily based upon dress.) In fact the T'ai and French had entered into an accord in 1948 wherein an independent T'ai Federation was created within the French Union, grouped in the provinces of Lai Châu, Phong Tho and Song Lan under the white T'ai President, Đèo Văn Long. Meanwhile, by 1950 the Tho were giving unlimited support to the Viet Minh.

The other mountain peoples supported either the white T'ai or the Tho depending upon local consideration – how they were treated by leaders, groups – rather than ideological considerations. Thus, numerous Hmong and Yao opposed the Tho and Viet Minh. These T'ai related forces supported the French in guerrilla operation against the Viet Minh bases in the upper Tonkin. A number of these pro-French peoples had been formalized into the French GMCA (Groupement de Commandos Mixtes Aeroportes or Composite Airborne Commando Group) by the French Service Action along with CIA support. These groups repeatedly harassed the Viet Minh position in the mountains. Between December 1952 and July 1954 twenty-five such military operation were conducted or assisted by these Montagnard guerrillas. Some of the more successful commando raids in 1953, such as the attack on the twin towns of Coc-Leu and Lai Cai in October made it necessary for the Viet Minh to ask for Chinese troops to cross into Tonkin to help defeat the "rebels", which they in fact did on more than one occasion.

Operations Castor and Pollux were meant to re-assert French control of Dien Bien Phu after it had been overrun by the Viet Minh in the Black River Offensive of 1952. General Salan and then General Navarre had begun the implementation of plans to re-take this base almost immediately after its abandonment in December 1952. Salan' top-secret Directive No. 40 (issued on January 10, 1953) stated: "The reoccupation of Dien Bien Phu must constitute in the forthcoming period the first step for regaining control of the T'ai country and for the elimination of the Viet Minh from the area west of the Black River." Salan's replacement General Navarre bought into this plan by the fall of 1953 and developed the basis for accomplishing it.

== Operation Pollux ==
The Dien Bien Phu plateau had long been recognized by the French as part of the T'ai federation and therefore falling into the white T'ai, Đèo Văn Long domain. Nevertheless, traditional control over this area was claimed by black T'ai leaders long installed in its surroundings and in the Song La area. Đèo Văn Long then removed the black T'ai leaders and replaced them with among others his own son. Such insensitive French (and its allies') moves alienated the black T'ai to the French cause. The main leaders eventually defected to the Viet Minh side as a consequence.

Subsequently, and, ultimately more importantly, the French committed another misjudgment which affected their own ally. After the French chose the Dien Bien Phu plateau for the ultimate confrontation with the Viet Minh (and took the area back on November 20–22 in 1953 in Operation Castor), they decided to withdraw from the less defended Lai Châu area and to repatriate the inhabitants from there to Dien Bien Phu. This withdrawal and repatriation was Operation Pollux.

As a token of respect for their long-time ally Đèo Văn Long, the French sent General Cogny personally to summon Đèo Văn Long and the white Tai people to abandon their traditional home and move (to where the battle was to be ultimately fought). The majority of the troops were airlifted to Dien Bien Phu from Lai Châu. The Tai irregulars had to March over the "piste Pavie" (a narrow jungle trail) and fight their way through over 110 km of Viet Minh (and their mountain allies) controlled jungle.

This group met with fierce opposition during the withdrawal and most of the white Tai irregulars and their French officers (Lieutenant grade and non-commissioned officers) accompanying then did not make it to their destination.

On December 11, the forces entrenched in Dien Bien Phu then made a major effort to reach and aid the guerrillas moving from Lai Châu. The 2nd Airborne Battle group moved north to try to link up with the T'ai forces moving south under Operation Pollux. The battle group not only failed to accomplish this but suffered substantial losses under constant Viet Minh ambush and was driven back to Dien Bien Phu by the Viet Minh.

After this failure, the same 2nd Airborne Battle Group sent a sortie south to link up with a combined French /Laotian force near Sop Nao. This link up was successful as the battle group did not meet any Viet Minh resistance. The soldiers did however experience great difficulty in moving over the thick jungle and limestone cliffs. After the link-up each group returned to its own base, experiencing the same problems in movement and, of course, accomplishing nothing of value. It was a public relations effort to demonstrate the ability to use Dien Bien Phu as a "mooring point" and "radiating point". But now the French command there saw the exact opposite – the difficulty in using troops at the base to disrupt Viet Minh activities in this area.

This recognition left two alternatives; withdraw or fight and face a major Viet Minh siege there. Gen. Navarre asked Gen. Cogny to develop a plan for a fighting retreat but Cogny did not immediately do so. When Cogny finally did provide such a plan on January 24, the Viet Minh were already encircling the base and Navarre and Cogny agreed the withdrawal now made no sense. However, the leadership also did nothing to fortify its garrison for the second alternative of the sustained siege. Instead Navarre concentrated on his offensive Operation Atlante in Annam at Da Nang and Nha Trang.

== Aftermath ==
Of the 2,100 men at the start of the evacuation, only 185 reached the outpost at Dien Bien Phu. Đèo Văn Long was flown to Hanoi with his court and all the wealth he could carry. He was never again to see his homeland later living in Laos and France, where he died.

The French decision to conduct Operation Pollux can only be described (in hindsight) as incredibly arrogant. It alienated most of the T'ai Federation, who viewed the decision as a humiliation. As a result, these troops were to support the remaining French war effort less than enthusiastically while accounting for nearly one quarter of the troops at Bien Dien Phu when the battle began four months later. Many fled to the mountains or defected to the Viet Minh during the battle. Together with the other Montagnard - black T'ai, Hmong, Yao and others - they aligned with the Viet Minh. They helped build and support the unprecedented artillery pounding and the encircling and undermining of the French outpost in what was ultimately the decisive battle the First Indochina War.
