= Air France Flight 1611 =

1968 airliner crash in the Mediterranean off Nice

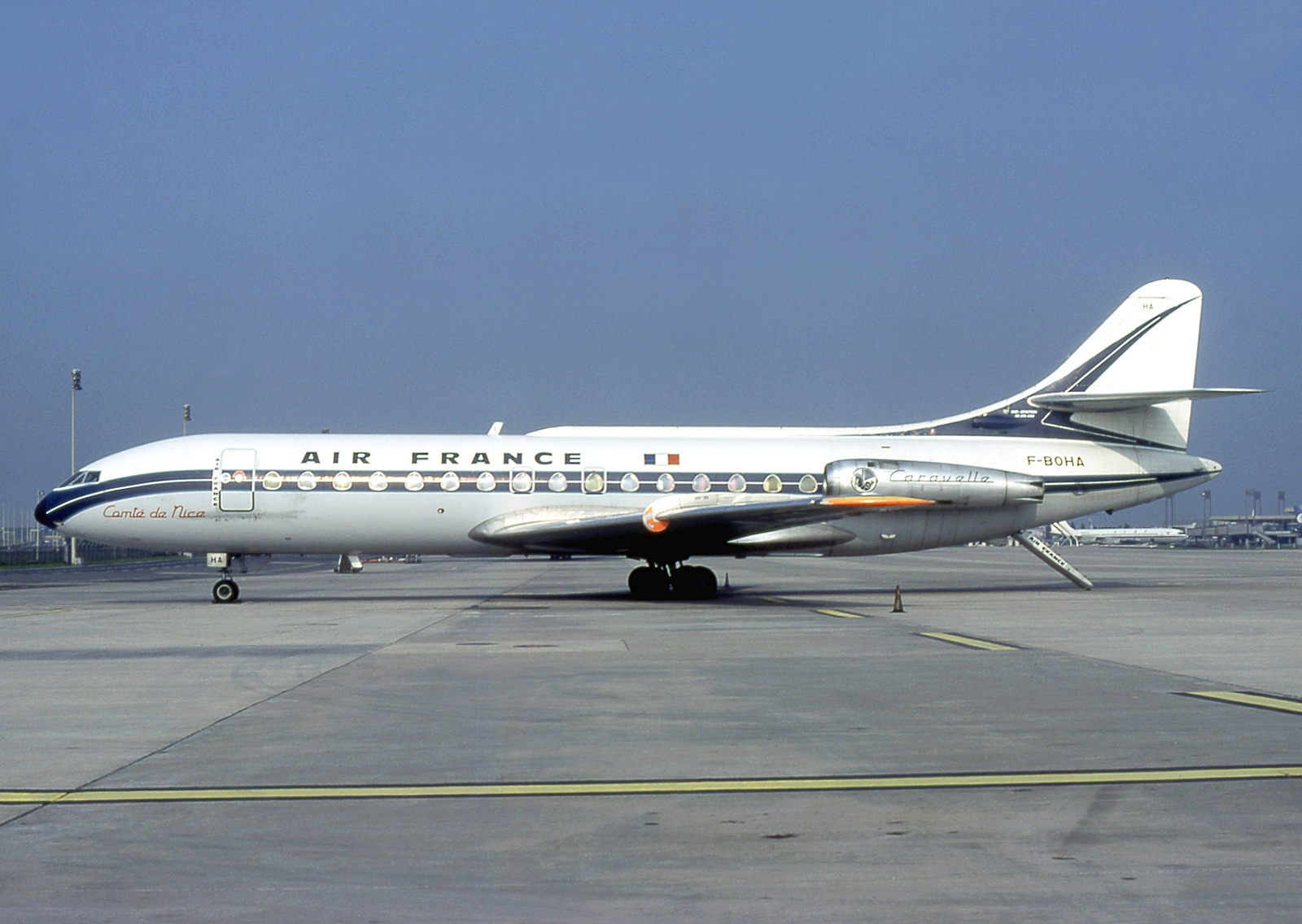
- A Caravelle similar to the one involved

Accident
- Date: 11 September 1968
- Summary: Loss of control after a fire in rear cabin of uncertain origin
- Site: Mediterranean Sea; 43°17′07″N 7°13′25″E

Aircraft
- Aircraft type: SE-210 Caravelle III
- Aircraft name: Béarn
- Operator: Air France
- Registration: F-BOHB
- Flight origin: Ajaccio-Campo Dell'Oro Airport
- Destination: Nice (Aéroport de Nice-Côte d'Azur)
- Occupants: 95
- Passengers: 89
- Crew: 6
- Fatalities: 95
- Survivors: 0

Air France Flight 1611 (AF1611) was a Sud Aviation SE-210 Caravelle III en route from Ajaccio, on the island of Corsica, to Nice, mainland France, on 11 September 1968 when it crashed into the Mediterranean Sea off Nice, killing all 95 on board. According to the official report, the crash was non-survivable. The Ajaccio–Nice Caravelle crash is the deadliest aviation incident in the Mediterranean Sea to date. The accident circumstances are still not clear.

The technical investigation stated that the probable cause was attributed to a fire of uncertain origin which originated in the rear passenger toilet, that propagated until the aircraft control was lost.

There was early speculation that the plane was hit by a surface-to-air missile, since there is a firing area not far from the crash site. Although the hypothesis was officially discarded by the inquiry board, many victims' relatives still have doubts and have asked to have access to classified documents about the event, which was supported in 2019 by President Emmanuel Macron.

== Accident ==
The Caravelle involved took off from Ajaccio at 10:09 local time, bound for Nice. The first part of the flight was without incident and the weather conditions were sunny. At 10:30 local time, on descending between flight level 90 (9,000 feet, 2,700 m) to flight level 70 (7,000 feet, 2,100 m) the flight crew declared an emergency mentioning a fire on board (listening to the flight recordings shows that the captain was reportedly concerned about events on board as early as 10:28 local time).

The Air traffic control immediately authorizes the airplane to take a direct route and to give the airplane priority to landing. At 10:32 the crew declared, "We have sight of the ground and good visibility." The radio and radar contact was lost after a final contact at 10:33, at 40–45 km from Nice, and the rescue services were triggered.

A kerosene slick and floating debris were discovered at 11:22 a.m., confirming that the plane had crashed into the sea. There were no survivors among the 89 passengers and six crew members on board.

== Flight crew ==
The crew was formed by six members:

- The captain was 35 years old Michael Salomon, with 8,836 flight hours;
- The first officer was 32 years old Emile Duvinage, with 4,293 flight hours;
- The flight engineer was 38 years old Roger Juan, with 4,364 flight hours;
- The cabin crew chief was 31 years old Michel Gérard, with 3,588 flight hours;
- The flight attendant was 29 years old Geneviève Tricot, with 774 flight hours;
- The trainee flight attendant was 22 years old Michèle Orry, with 139 flight hours.

== Passengers ==
The list of 89 passengers included, notably, Lieutenant General René Cogny, Polish atomic physicist Jerzy Sawicki, and Irish banker Arthur O'Connor.

== Wreckage recovery ==
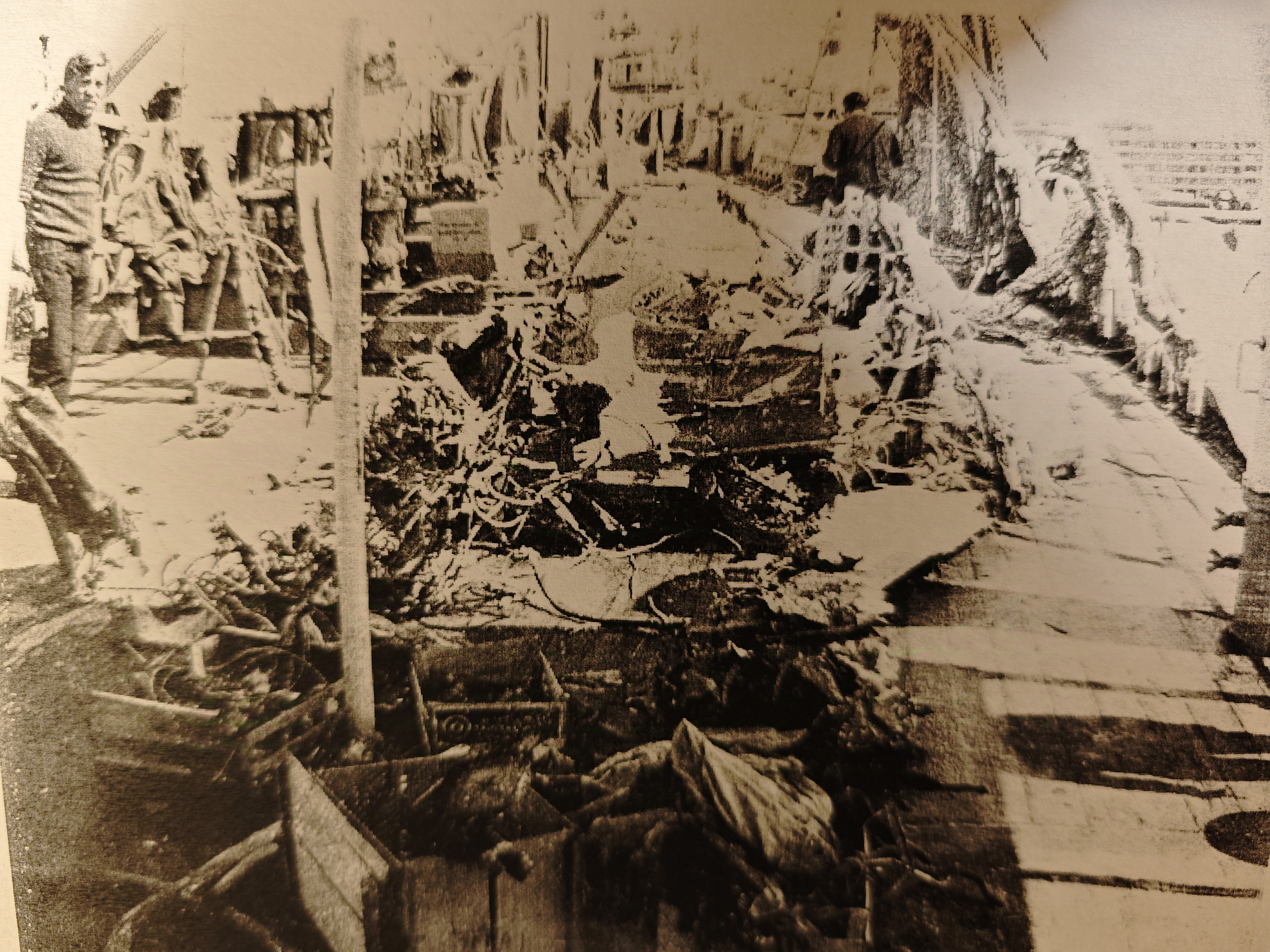
Debris from the Caravelle F-BOHB recovered in 1971.

Debris recovery from the seabed was carried out in four phase taking place from November 1968 to April 1971. Two expeditions were carried out by Alsace ship from February 15, 1969 to March 1, 1969 and from March 10 to March 16, 1969 in which thousands of usable photographs could be taken. During another operation, from September 28 to October 3, 1970, more photographs are taken. The Archimède vessel was used to search and study the caravelle wreckage and thousands of underwater photographs are taken. The last recovery operation was carried out from March 25, 1971 to April 13, 1971 and many of the recovered debris were deposited at the Toulon arsenal. A photograph of all recovered debris, stored in Tolouse, was taken on May 15, 1971.

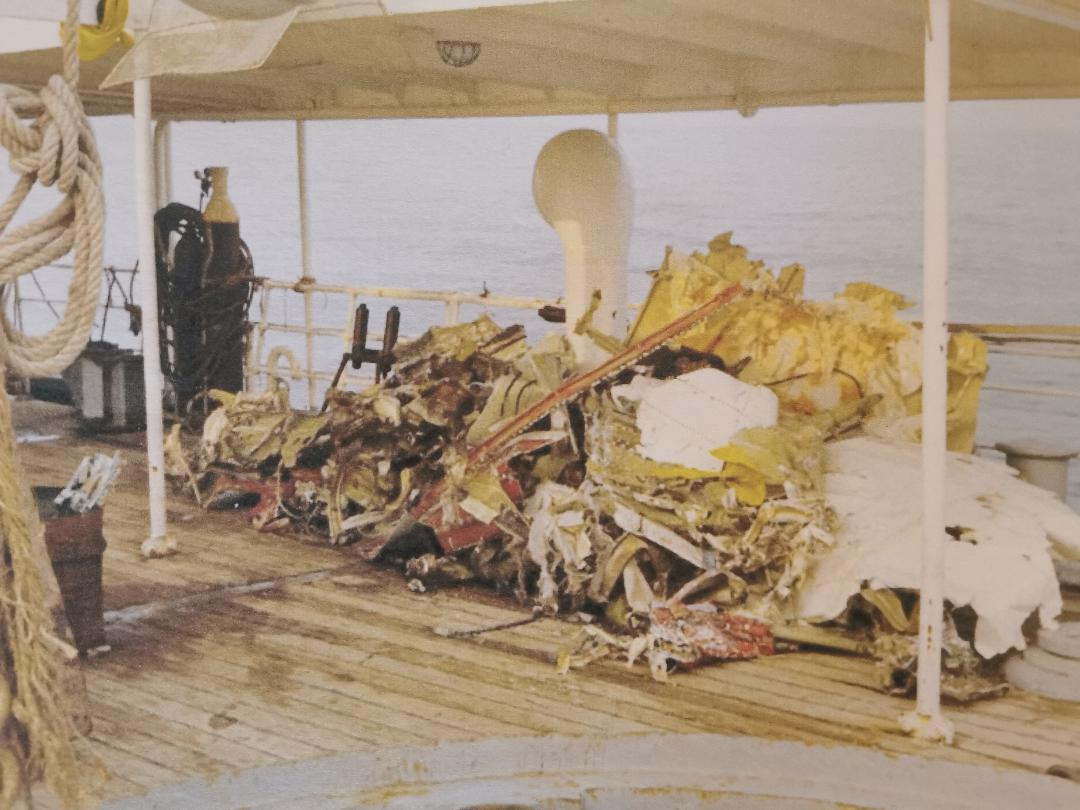
Debris from the Caravelle on board the cable-laying ship Alsace. Trawling campaigns of April 14, 1971.

For this purpose specific equipment were developed (ultrasonic transceiver, acoustic beacon, and computer). Four thousand work hours allowed the identification of 6/7 tons of material from all parts of the airplane, including pieces of engine. The Flight data recorder was recovered at 2.300 meters deep during the last operation; it was revealed to be unreadable because the tape was apparently damaged in the section relating to the end of the flight, while for previous flights the flight recorder was usable.

During the debris recovery operation, Jean DuPont, a pilot and member of the inquiry commission, expressed concern about malfunctions. He explained that he had very precisely determined a theoretical crash zone for the aircraft "from the very first trawling operations; my theoretical crash zone was completely disregarded, only the one given by the commanding officer of the Ardent, a French Navy escort vessel, who had participated in and even directed the surface recovery of the wreckage on the day of the accident. It seems surprising that the French Navy's bridge officers would make such a gross navigational error 20 miles from the coast."

== Investigation ==
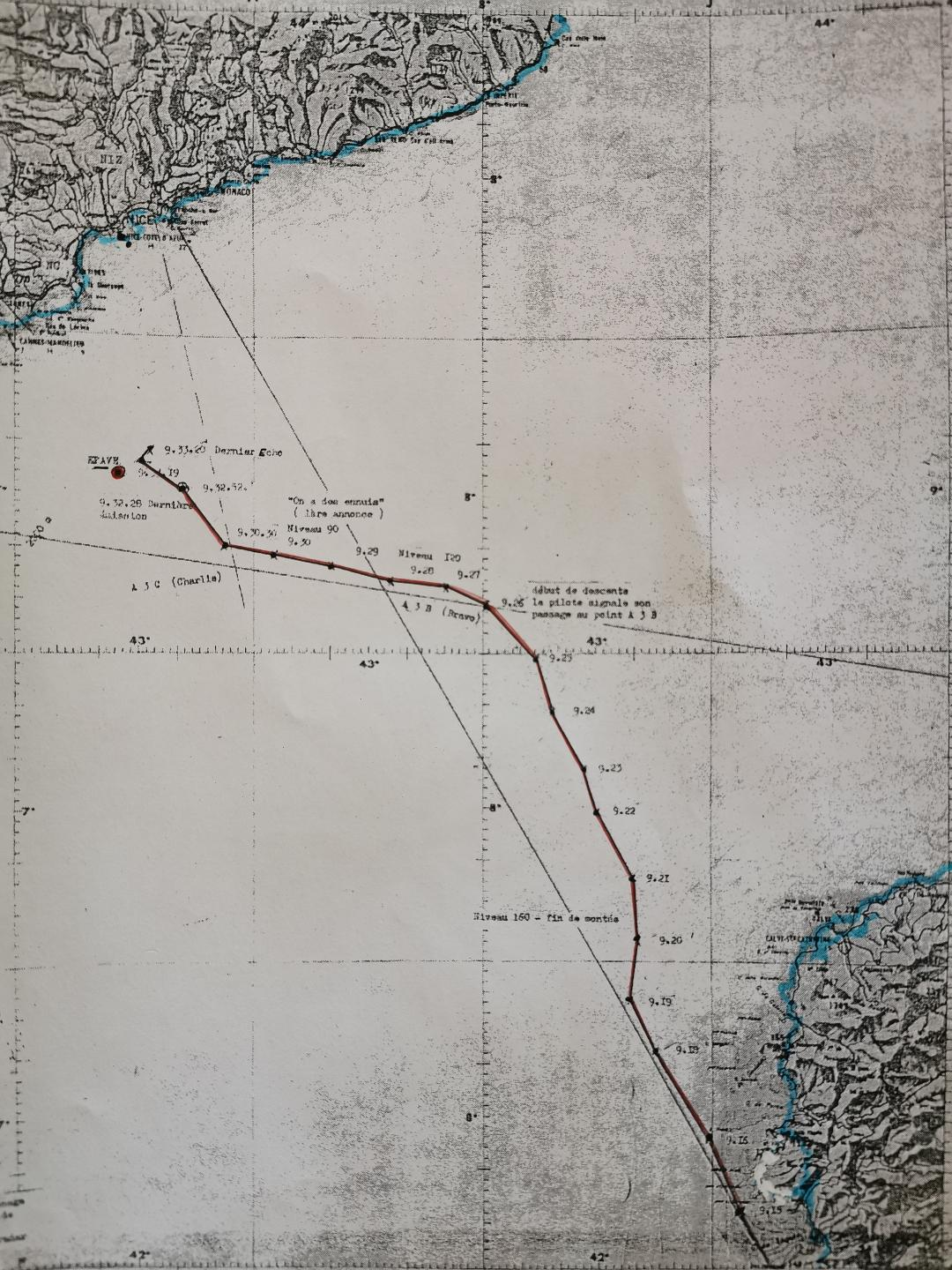
Journey of the Caravelle F-BOHB on September 11, 1968.

On September 12, 1968, the Minister of Transport Jean Chamant established a commission of inquiry to investigate on the circumstances and causes and learn from it.

On December 14, 1972, the inquiry board of the French ministry of transport published its official report. The report surmised that the loss of the aircraft had been caused by a fire in the passenger toilet caused either by a defective water heater or a cigarette discarded in a waste bin. This rejected the suggestion of any missile strike, basing its findings on the aircraft's survival time after the pilot's initial report to air traffic control of a fire on board, the examination of the wreckage recovered from the seabed, knowledge of a similar accidental fire in another Sud Aviation Caravelle, and the declaration by the French defense ministry that there were no surface ships in the area capable of launching missiles. The report noted that: "the direct cause of loss of control could not be definitively established: it may be related to the pilots' physical incapacity caused either by toxic gas emissions or by passengers invading the cockpit."

The commission of inquiry examined the hypothesis of a collision with another aircraft, the impact with a missile, or from a lightning strike. Affirming to have received formal assurances from the Minister of the Armed Forces, Pierre Messmer, with a letter dated November 19, 1968 that no missile was fired in the flight path of the Caravelle at the time of the accident. It was estimated that a collision with a missile or an airplane will maybe cause serious immediate damage and that the plane it would not have continued flying for three minutes. The radar recordings does not showed other echoes on vicinity. The results on the debris does not seemed consistent with a lightning strike or an explosion.

== Other theories ==
=== Engine fire ===
On 12 August 1969, Henry Forestier, vice director of Central laboratory of the police headquarters and appointed by Giannantoni, Divisional Commissioner of the Air and Border Police, presented is conclusions at the Judicial investigation into the origin of the fire on the Caravelle: "It was observed that the rear section of the Caravelle suffered a particularly intense fire in the area of the left rear lavatory," he added, "the only explanation is that of an engine fire, the rear part of which is at the same height as the lavatory, and the fire [...] appears, in all likelihood, to have been caused by a fire in the aircraft's left engine, which spread the fire inside the aircraft." His expert opinion was not taken into consideration by the commission of inquiry. In the report, an unknown hand crossed out the word "left" and replaced it with "right."

On July 27, 1970, the board of inquiry indicated that the fire alarms on one engine did not activate. "There is no way to know whether the fire could have spread inside the fuselage from a fire that started outside." Two pilots support the hypothesis that an explosion could have destroyed the alarm system.

On June 28, 1971, Paul Giannantoni, director of the judicial investigation, sent a report to the investigating judge on the fire hypothesis and stated: "According to the investigation, the fire appeared more significant in the toilet and between the toilet and the fuselage than in the bathroom compartment. If we take the water heater as the center, this suggests that the fire flowed towards it rather than starting from it," the fire would therefore have an external origin.

=== Missile ===
At the moment of the accident, the Caravelle was flying at about sixty kilometers north-east from DGA Essays de missiles on the Levant Island a structure of Direction générale de l'Armement, where test of new missiles and training launches of the armed forces are carried out regularly.

Ten days after the crash, 21 September, Paris Match advanced the theory that the Caravelle could have been the victim of a missile strike, claims at military exercises were taking place in the area and proposes three hypotheses to explain the tragedy, including the impact of a training missile. In June 1970, the Ministry of National Defense issued a statement denying rumors that a missile strike was responsible for the crash.

On 10 May 2011, Michel Laty, a former army typist, alleged on French television channel TF1 that he saw a report indicating a missile, misfired by the French army during a weapon test, in fact caused the crash.

A 2019 article in The Guardian newspaper reported that, after the crash, documents and photographs about it disappeared. The 11 September page in the log book for Le Suffren, a French Navy missile frigate in the area, was torn out. The aircraft's black box flight recorder was said to have been damaged, with the recording of flight AF1611 unreadable, although earlier flights were recorded. Wreckage recovered was seized by France's military. An investigation was started in 2011 by gendarmes. A family member of one of those killed said "The investigating judge has said he is practically certain to almost 100% that the plane was hit by a missile. Now we are waiting".

In 2019, French president Emmanuel Macron wrote to a victim's family, saying that he hoped the affair would be declassified. He ordered Armed Forces Minister Florence Parly to request the Committee on National Defence to act towards a release of military records related to the crash.

==== Suspicions of concealing evidence ====
A recording made at Mont Agel, a military air traffic control center located above Menton, documenting the morning of the military maneuvers of September 11, 1968, was seized that evening by two individuals claiming to be from the French intelligence service (Renseignements généraux) during the editing of the report at the ORTF studios in La Brague, Antibes. The recording shows the sound "Damn, we lost it!" (referring to the missile). This testimony from Alain Frasquet, the ORTF sound engineer who was recording the report, was corroborated by two other witnesses during the criminal investigation. He stated: "My colleague in Paris had a terrible scoop. I heard on his tape recorder, 'We've lost it, we've lost it.' It was a voice over a loudspeaker inside Mont Agel. If they had lost a radar station, it would have been the soldier at Mont Agel who spoke. But in this case, it was a loudspeaker inside the center." It was someone from the military speaking to the radar operators at Mount Agel. A recorded voice has a different timbre than a loudspeaker.

On examining a confidential mail log from 1968 of the Maritime Prefecture of Toulon, a page was removed. The log then jumps one page, and this missing page was issued between September and October 1968. That page it turns out to be a note dated 30 October 1968 regarding a meeting of officials of the various directions with the Major General of Navy. That meeting took place on 17 October 1968 at the Naval General Staff in Paris, and for which an urgent summons message had already been issued on 12 September 1968. Jean-Philippe Brunet states that: "I was next to the bunker on the morning of September 11, 1968 when the gendarmes arrived and made us leave that place because secret experiments were being carried out on the island of Levante. I even saw soldiers filming the Mediterranean."

On 30 August 2005, Mathieu Paoli, president of the victims' families' collective, stated: "On October 12, 2004, we were received by the chief of staff of Michèle Alliot-Marie, the Minister of Defense, who provided us with documents on the military exercises… We never receive the documents we request. For us, the missile theory remains credible."

The testimony of Michel Rousseau, former second commander on board of frigate Suffren, he specifies that: «We were in the area where the Caravelle had crashed, i saw the debris on the surface, the military divers were collecting it and putting it in bags and then they had to be unloaded at the military arsenal in Toulon» The testimony of Jean-Marc Decaux, mariner aboard the Alsace, merchant navy trawler assigned to the sea search campaign for the wreck of the airplane in March 1971, states that some very surprising events took place on Alsace: "The recovered wreckage of the aircraft was not unloaded at the port of Nice but at the Toulon military arsenal for alleged reasons of confidentiality, and it was only at the end that the army detained this wreckage.".

In 2009, the son of captain Jean DuPont, pilot of the Air France Caravelle and member of the commission of inquiry, filed a letter with the High Court of Nice, dated 16 July 1970. In that letter, Jean DuPont writes that he is under pressure and observes: "I am beginning to realize that i am clashing with a power whose motives in this affair i am unaware of." As a member of the investigation, he had very quickly expressed doubts about the version of events, realizing that he was being denied the means to access the truth. In his letter, he states that the official causes of the "accident" were forced upon him during the drafting of the final report; essentially, regarding the hypothesis of a collision with a missile, the chapter on which, he claims, has been completely altered. Later, he announces his fear for his life: "Reasons of state justify all crimes. If, before this affair is clarified, I were to suffer the slightest accident, the slightest illness, those responsible must be sought among the military and government authorities."

Regarding the missile theory advanced by Raymond Auffray, a weapons expert who participated in the CET, Alain de Valence, an Air France captain, said: "We know that there is equipment being tested over which we have not always had complete control. In 1968, everything was shrouded in secrecy. The situation was unique and would explain why many things were kept secret. Everything was monitored." Regarding the failure of the alarms at the time of the accident, Alain de Valence believes that "if the fire starts inside the reactor, there is a system that activates the alarm, but it is designed to detect a fire, not an explosion. Missile theory could be taken into account in this regard. If there is an explosion, the system is destroyed and there is no alarm." This statement is confirmed by another pilot: "In the event of an explosion or collision, the reactor is destroyed and there is no alarm."

== Legal actions ==
=== Complaints for manslaughter ===
On 17 November 2008, the association of the families of the victims of the Caravelle Ajaccio-Nice disaster (AFVCCAN) was created in Vallauris. Chaired by Mathieu Paoli, its aim was "to do everything possible [...] to ensure that the causes of the disaster are ascertained and the truth is finally known; counter-investigation, search at sea for the engines [...]". Manslaughter lawsuits against the Ministry of Defense were filed in 2006 by the children of two of the victims and in 2008 by AFVCCAN, representing 35 families of victims, but were dismissed due to the statute of limitations. An appeal submitted on August 17, 2010 to the European Court of Human Rights was declared inadmissible on December 8, 2011.

On December 15, 2011, the Nice Regional Court ruled inadmissible the direct summons of the army for involuntary manslaughter. Following a complaint filed at the end of September 2011, the French justice system decided to reopen an investigation for "removal and concealment of evidence" on March 20, 2012. The complaint was closed without further action on July 7, 2014. On July 21, 2014, a new complaint with civil action was entrusted to Alain Chemama, senior investigating judge in Nice, for removal of documents and concealment of evidence.

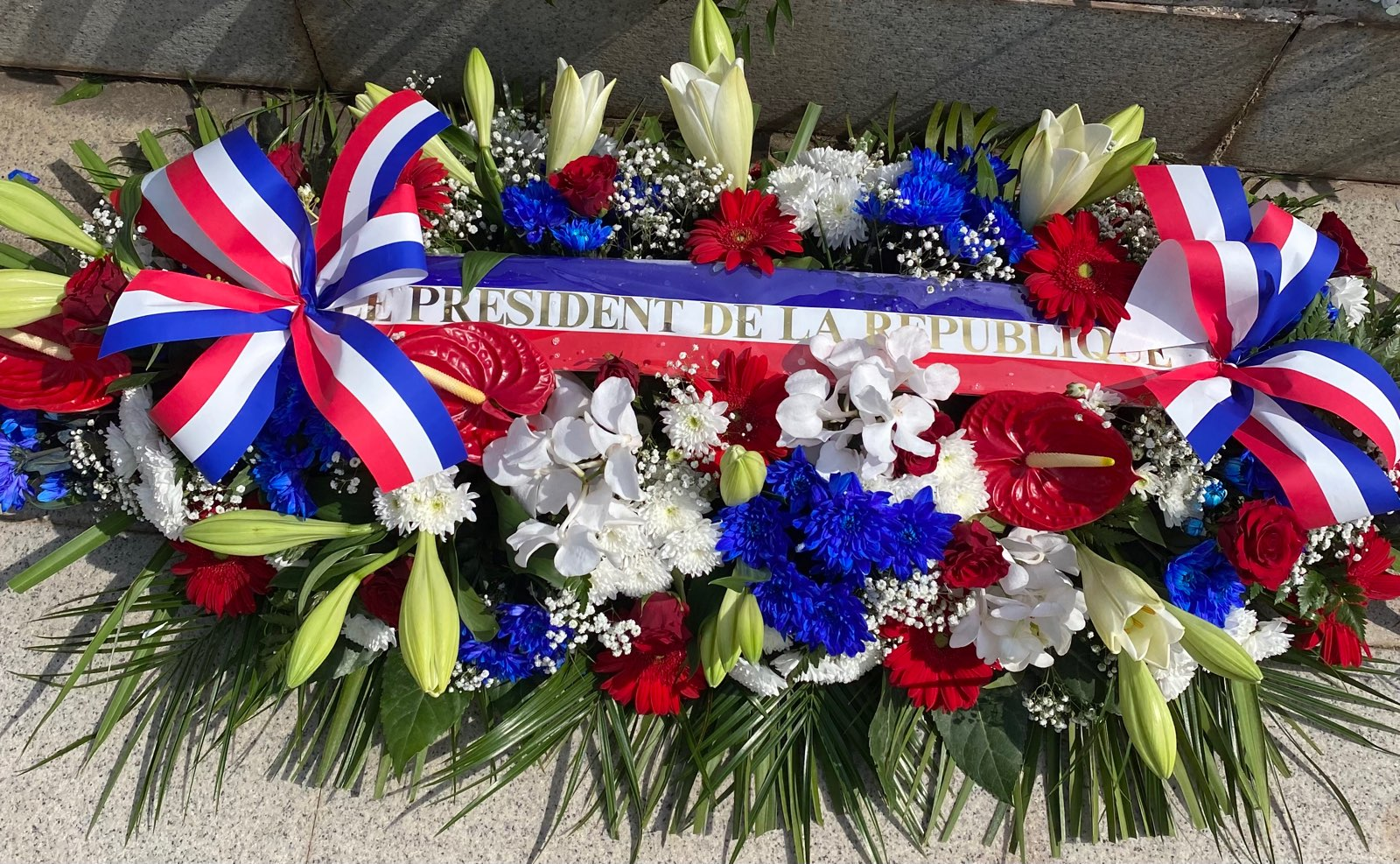
At each commemoration, numerous wreaths are laid in Nice and Ajaccio. In 2021, a wreath was laid on behalf of the President of the Republic, Emmanuel Macron.

=== Requests to lift the "national security" classification ===
In 2008, the victims' families association filed a complaint with the judicial authorities, presenting evidence supporting the missile theory. On July 5, 2019, Alain Chemama, senior investigating judge in Nice and head of the judicial inquiry, acknowledged the missile theory as highly plausible and requested the lifting of national security restrictions.

After three years of investigation conducted by the Nice gendarmerie and noting that the missile hypothesis was very serious, the investigating judge officially requested on March 28, 2018, that Prime Minister Édouard Philippe declassify the civil and military documents related to the disaster and lift the defense secrecy on all military exercises of 11 September 1968 in southeastern France in order to establish the truth and finalize the legal action.

On 11 October 2019, Mathieu and Louis Paoli members of AFVCCAN, are requesting an underwater dive on the remains of the wreck, as with the Minerve submarine, to see if the left reactor is there, as it is the one that was allegedly hit by a training missile. The same day the civil parties, the Paoli brothers, and their lawyers were received at the Élysée Palace regarding the ongoing investigations.

On March 9, 2021, the President of the Republic decided to ease the secrecy surrounding classified archives over 50 years old. The Caravelle crash is among the files declassified by Emmanuel Macron. On October 23, 2024, the Families of the Victims, represented by the Paoli brothers and their lawyers, were received at the Élysée Palace regarding future underwater searches of the wreck of the Caravelle. On December 17, 2025, investigating magistrate Federica Sarli received the civil parties, Mathieu and Louis Paoli, along with their lawyers, to show them some underwater photos of the caravelle wreck taken in October 2025.

== Aftermath ==
=== Search and discovery ===
On October 31, 2024, the public prosecutor gave his approval for the recovery of the wreckage.

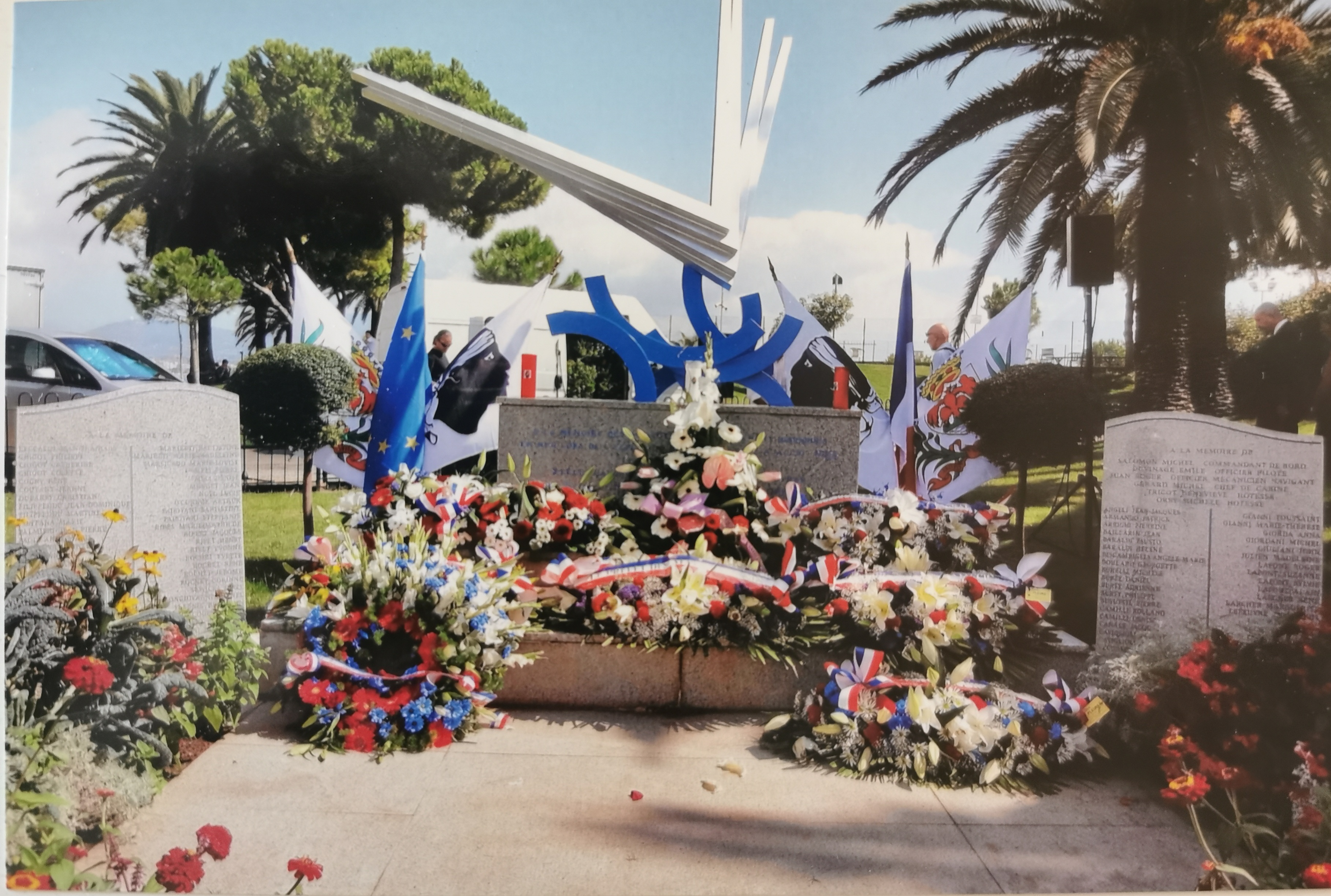
Stele on the Promenade des Anglais in Nice during the day.

On February 18, 2025, the investigating judge authorized a dive on the wreck of the Caravelle in order to determine the exact reasons for the crash. On June 10, 2025, the public prosecutor of Nice and the investigating judge met with the services of the Mediterranean Maritime Prefecture to discuss the procedures for a search at sea by the French Navy, to be carried out in two phases: at the end of 2025 and in the first half of 2026. In September 2025, the court ordered a new search of the seabed for the wreck, which was found in October.

=== Memorials ===
A stele was erected on the Promenade des Anglais in Nice in memory of the 95 missing, as well as a chapel in the marine cemetery of Ajaccio and a plaque in the Garoupe chapel in Cap d'Antibes.
