= 316th Division (Vietnam) =

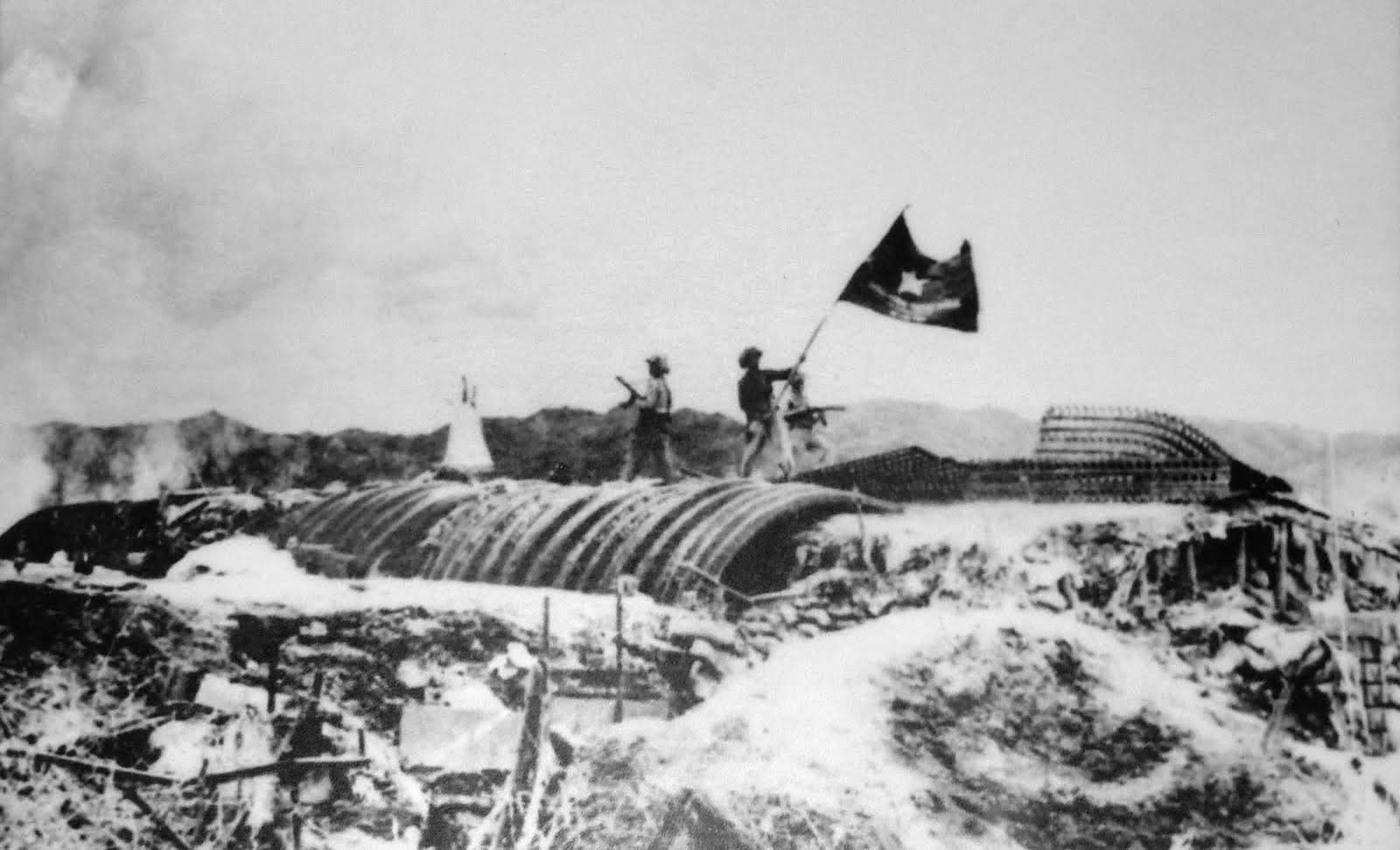
- Victorious Việt Minh soldiers at Điện Biên Phủ
- Active: 1951–present
- Allegiance: Vietnam
- Branch: Vietnam People's Army
- Role: Infantry
- Size: Division
- Nicknames: Bông Lau (Silvergrass), Bien Hoa, Highland
- Engagements: First Indochina War * Battle of Mạo Khê * Operation Lorraine * Battle of Điện Biên Phủ; Vietnam War * Battle of Ban Me Thuot * Fall of Saigon; Sino-Vietnamese War
- Decorations: Order of Ho Chi Minh (1985)

Commanders
- Notable commanders: Major General Lê Quảng Ba; General Chu Huy Mân; Colonel General Vũ Lập; Colonel General Vũ Lăng; Colonel General Nguyễn Hữu An; Lieutenant General Đàm Văn Ngụy

The 316th Division or Bông Lau Division (Vietnamese: Sư đoàn Bông Lau, literally: Silvergrass Division) was a division of the People's Army of Vietnam (PAVN). One of the 6 original "Steel and Iron Divisions", it was created in 1951 and consisted of some 10,000 to 15,000 men.

== First Indochina War ==
The 316th Division was formed in February/March 1951 from various ethnic minorities in the high region bordering Laos and first saw action in April 1951 at the Battle of Mạo Khê.

In October 1952 the 316th took part in the attack on Nghia Lo as part of a Viet Minh offensive against French positions on the Red River and in the high region near Laos. In April 1953 the 316th moved towards Xam Neua which was abandoned as indefensible by the French, by 23 April the 316th and 308th had surrounded a French air-land base on the Plain of Jars.

From September–November 1953 Regiment 176 from the 316th engaged French GCMA teams in the Song River valley and that were blocking Route Provinciale 41. On 15 November the remainder of the 316th was ordered to move into the T'ai Highlands. The 316th harassed the T'ai Federation forces as they retreated from Lai Châu to Điện Biên Phủ, capturing Lai Chau on 12 December and by 17 December they were deployed east of Điện Biên Phủ.

In January 1954, a Battalion from Regiment 176 accompanied the 308th Division on a probe towards Luang Prabang, capturing Muong Khoua on 1 February. Hampered by French airpower, the airdrop of the 1st Colonial Parachute Battalion on Muong Sai and the deployment of Groupe Mobile 7 to Luang Prabang, the Viet Minh force withdrew towards Điện Biên Phủ on 20/21 February.

During the Battle of Điện Biên Phủ, the 316th's first action was on 15 March 1954 probing the French strongpoints at Dominique 5 after the capture of Strongpoint Beatrice by the 312th Division. Further south Battalion 888 of Regiment 176 was tasked with isolating Strongpoint Isabelle from the central French position in the valley. On 27 March the 98th and 174th Regiments were assigned the task of capturing the Eliane 1 and 4 strongpoints. The attack on Eliane commenced at 5pm on 30 March and the 320th succeeded in capturing Eliane 1 within 3 hours, but were unable to secure Eliane 2 in a fierce battle. Eliane 1 was recaptured by a French counterattack on 31 March but had to be abandoned again that day and was recaptured by the French on 10 April. On 31 March Regiment 98 was relieved by Regiment 102 of the 308th Division. On the night of 31 March Regiment 102 again attempted to take Eliane 2 but was beaten back and then replaced by Regiment 98 on 3 April. On 11 April Regiments 98 and 174 attempted to recapture Eliane 1 but were forced back. Following the failure of these attacks the Viet Minh resorted to choking off the French strongpoints by digging trenches and saps and, in the case of Eliane 2 a mine gallery under the hill. For the final assault on the French positions on the night of 6/7 May, Regiment 174 was tasked with taking Eliane 4 while Regiment 98 would make another attempt to take Eliane 2. At 6:45pm Regiment 98 began their attack and were held back by French artillery fire from Strongpoint Isabelle until Viet Minh counter-battery fire took effect. At approximately 9:30pm the Viet Minh exploded a mine under Eliane 2 and after some hesitation Regiment 98 renewed its attack at 11pm and by 5am on 7 May had finally succeeded in capturing Eliane 2. The 174th Regiment's attack on Eliane 4 commenced at 9:30pm and lasted throughout the night and the French were finally overrun at 9:30am on 7 May. Total estimated losses among the 316th Division at the Battle of Điện Biên Phủ are 1250 killed.

== Vietnam War ==
In 1961 the 316th Brigade was brought up to strength and assigned to the PAVN Northwest Military Region. In March 1962 two battalions from the 316th Brigade deployed to Luang Namtha in northwest Laos to engage Royal Lao Army (RLA) forces in the Battle of Luang Namtha.

In December 1967 the Division was sent back to Laos to assist Pathet Lao forces fighting in the Battle of Nam Bac and by mid-January 1968 they had succeeded in forcing the RLA from Nam Bac.

In September 1969 the Division together with the 312th Division took part in Campaign 139 on the Plain of Jars in support of the Pathet Lao dry season offensive.

From 2 February to 30 April 1971 the Division launched Campaign 74B and temporarily gained control of the Plain of Jars.

From 17 December 1971 to 30 January 1972 the Division and the 312th Division participated in Campaign Z in Laos.

In 1973/4 the Division was ordered to return from Laos to North Vietnam and was stationed in Nghệ An and Hà Tĩnh Provinces.

In early 1975 the Division was moved by truck from Nghệ An Province to Darlac Province to take part in Campaign 275. During the Battle of Ban Me Thuot on 10 March the Division's 174th Regiment attacked and captured the Mai Hac De district in western Ban Me Thuot, they were forced back by an Army of the Republic of Vietnam (ARVN) 23rd Division counterattack and airstrikes, but the Division counterattacked and by the morning of 11 March controlled most of the city.

On 29 March 1975 the PAVN formed 3rd Corps comprising the Division, 10th and 320th Divisions, the 675th Artillery Regiment, the 312th Anti-aircraft Regiment, 198th Sapper Regiment, 273rd Tank Regiment, 545th Engineer Regiment and the 29th Signal Regiment under the command of Major General Vũ Lăng.

Following the Vietnamese Politburo decision to capitalise on the opportunity presented by the collapsing ARVN, in early April the 316th was ordered to move out of the Central Highlands down Route 14 towards Saigon By 15 April the Division occupied positions near Dầu Tiếng Base Camp in preparation for the assault on Saigon. By late April the Division blocked Route 1 and Route 22 to fix the ARVN 25th Division in place. On 29 April the Division attacked the ARVN 46th and 49th Regiments, 25th Division at Phuoc Hiep, Trảng Bàng and Go Dau Ha.

== Post Vietnam War ==
In the Sino-Vietnamese War of 1979, the 316th formed part of the 2nd Military Region and was engaged in the defense of Lai Châu Province and Hoàng Liên Sơn Province. This division participated in the Battle of Lao Cai.

The 316th received the Order of Ho Chi Minh in 1985.
