= Vũ Quốc Uy =

Vũ Quốc Uy (1920–1994) was a Vietnamese writer and cultural politician.

Uy was born into a small intellectual family in Nam Định Province, Vietnam. He was lucky to study in a Thanh Chung level school, so he soon felt sensitive to the cultural life and art of urban youth. He soon wished "to open a small bookshop and freely read the new books".

Actively acting in the field of culture and art, Vũ Quốc Uy was suddenly arrested and put under house arrest by the French in 1944.

In April 1945, he escaped from house arrest and intended to go to the liberation area in Viet Bac but was reassigned to Haiphong.

After participation in an uprising in Hanoi, Vũ Quốc Uy was once again assigned to Haiphong and gathered the forced and raised in army to seize power on August 23, 1945. As a title of a chairman of Interim Revolutionary people's committee of Haiphong, Vũ Quốc Uy declared that the old authority was overthrown and then established the Interim revolutionary people's committee of Haiphong.

Then he concurrently held the position of chairman of the City defending committee. Vũ Quốc Uy and other members of Haiphong Party committees determined "our top task is to build a whole people's solidarity block to advance revolutionary cause successful." Vũ Quốc Uy was interested in building the Haiphong Democratic Party committee as a member of it.

After Haiphong-Kien An entered the resistance against the French forces, Vu Quoc Uy participated in inter-province Hai-Kien as a Standing member, head of disseminating and training department, and director of To Hieu Political School.

As these above positions, Vũ Quốc Uy and the whole school staff overcame hard period in its Deo Voi branch in Đông Triều District, Quang Yen Province and other branches opened many training classes for 1000 staff, Party members to serve struggling task and seizing the city.

After the end of the Vietnam War, Vũ Quốc Uy was appointed vice chairman and chairman of Foreign Cultural Affairs Committee until his retirement. Concurrently he was appointed chairman of Vietnam Stamp Association.

To the Party and people of Haiphong city, Vũ Quốc Uy prided on living and working 'in new hometown with heroic features'. With a confidentiality of an artist official, Vũ Quốc Uy wrote his reminiscences such as 'I came back to Haiphong in the general uprising', 'Acting under the light of cultural platform' and 'Hard days in Deo Voi', ... On the occasion of 30th anniversary of liberation of Haiphong (May 13, 1955 May 13, 1985), Vũ Quốc Uy wrote a volume of book named 'Sunrise on Cam River' to recall 500 days of Haiphong from uprising to struggling against the French colonialists (August 1945 – July 1954) and with a task of writing on sea port land such as 'nop lan Dang liem cuoi cung cho Dang bo Haiphong'. On November 19, 1994, Vũ Quốc Uy died in regret of his comrades and people of Haiphong city where he considered as his hometown with heroic features.
