= Operation Ceinture =

- Part of the First Indochina War
- The region of Đông Bắc, encompassing much of the Hanoi, Thái Nguyên and Tuyên Quang area.
Date	20 November 1947 – 22 December 1947
Location	North-west of Hanoi, French Indochina
Result	French victory
Territorial changes	Viet-Minh expelled from the region of Hanoi, Thái Nguyên and Tuyên Quang, but many escape French cordons.

Belligerents
French Union: France; French Indochina	Democratic Republic of Vietnam: (North Vietnam) Việt Minh

Commanders and leaders
Jean Étienne Valluy	Unknown

Strength
18 battalions	Regiment 112; Doc Lap Brigade

Operation Ceinture was a late 1947 military endeavour by the French Far East Expeditionary Corps against the Viet Minh during the First Indochina War. A month-long effort that commenced on 20 November following the cessation of Operation Léa, Ceinture (French: belt) intended to rid the region between Hanoi, Thái Nguyên and Tuyên Quang of Viet-Minh infiltration. The French utilised 18 paratroop battalions and naval landing craft to engage the Viet-Minh's 112th Regiment, however the latter were able to for the most part slip through French cordons, abandoning weapon caches. The cumulative casualties after Operation Ceinture and Operation Lea were 1,000 for the French and 9,500 for the Viet Minh (though some of these may have been civilians).

The French did succeed in securing the region, and they withdrew their forces on 22 December, leaving a scattering of jungle fortifications to hold the region.
