= René Cogny =

- Born: 25 April 1904; Saint-Valery-en-Caux, Normandy, France
- Died: 11 September 1968 (aged 64); Mediterranean
- Military career
- Allegiance: France
- Branch: French Army
- Rank: Général de corps d'armée
- Nicknames: Le General Vitesse (General Hurry-Up), 'Coco the Siren'
- Commands: Forces Terrestres du Nord Viêtnam
- Conflicts: World War II; First Indochina War; Operation Pollux; Battle of Dien Bien Phu; Operation Condor (1954)
- Awards: Croix de Guerre

René Cogny (25 April 1904 in Saint-Valery-en-Caux – 11 September 1968) was a French Général de corps d'armée, World War II and French Resistance veteran and survivor of Buchenwald and Mauthausen-Gusen concentration camps. He was a commander of the French forces in Tonkin (northern Vietnam) during the First Indochina War, and notably during the Battle of Dien Bien Phu. His post-war private and legal conflict with superior General Henri Navarre became a public controversy. Known to his men as Le General Vitesse (General Hurry-Up), and reputable for his military pomp, physical presence and skill with the press, Cogny was killed in the 1968 Ajaccio-Nice Caravelle crash in the Mediterranean near Nice.

== Biography ==
=== Early life ===
Cogny was born in Normandy in April 1904, the son of a police sergeant. An academically gifted boy, Cogny was awarded a scholarship to École Polytechnique, where he received an engineering degree, a diploma from the French Institute of Political Science, and a doctorate in law. Cogny enlisted in the French Army before the outbreak of World War II, graduating in 1929 from the Fontainebleau artillery school, and was a battery commander by the time the war started. He was awarded the Croix de Guerre during early engagements.

=== World War II ===
In June 1940, he was one of 780,000 soldiers captured by the German army as it circumvented the Maginot Line. He was held in captivity for almost a year before he escaped in May by crawling naked through a drain pipe with three companions, pushing their disguises out in front of them. He moved back to Vichy France through Bavaria in 1941 to join the Armistice Army and the underground French Resistance. In 1943, now a major, he was arrested by the Gestapo and underwent six months of interrogation and torture in Fresnes prison before being sent to Buchenwald and, later, Mauthausen, concentration camps. He was liberated in April 1945 in a poor state of health. Though he did recover from being a "walking skeleton", his severe limp would require the use of a cane for the rest of his life.

Between 1946 and 1947 he commanded an infantry division near Paris, then gained political experience in an appointment to the War Ministry as executive secretary to the Defence Minister and later to the staff of General Jean de Lattre de Tassigny. He was sent with de Lattre to French Indochina in 1950 and after the latter's departure commanded a division in Tonkin and a Groupe Mobile in the Red River Delta. Henri Navarre later offered him command of the Forces Terrestres du Nord Viêtnam (North Vietnam Ground Forces, or FTNV), and he oversaw the French efforts in the Delta until the end of the war.

=== Dien Bien Phu ===
According to Davidson, Cogny was in fact the officer who proposed Dien Bien Phu as a "mooring point" to Navarre. Jules Roy, however, disagrees. Where Cogny had envisioned a light mobile base of operations, Roy argues, Navarre saw a heavily defended fortress. Cogny was one of many officers who protested against this new strategy, stating that "we are running the risk of a new Na San under worse conditions" (Na San was successfully defended during a nine-day siege but was thereafter evacuated). These protests, however, had no effect. Though stationed in Hanoi during the Battle of Dien Bien Phu itself, having seen the battle turning against France, Cogny attempted to reach the besieged garrison to take command; however, his aircraft was beaten back by anti-air fire on 17 March 1954. He considered parachuting in, but was advised against it. Throughout the battle, Cogny and his superior Navarre were at odds on the disposition of forces between Dien Bien Phu, Cogny's own sector in the Tonkin Delta, and Navarre's Operation 'Atlante'. In response to a damning letter from Navarre on 29 March, Cogny informed his superior that he no longer wished to serve under his command. The time scale for his departure was not discussed at the time, and Cogny continued to serve under Navarre, with the relationship between the two degrading significantly. Cogny would continue attempts to with-hold certain reinforcements from Dien Bien Phu or relating relief efforts if he believed it would undermine his strength in the Tonkin Delta. On 2 May, Navarre went as far to threaten Cogny with an investigation into his 'defeatist' press releases. As Dien Bien Phu was about to fall, it was Cogny who took the final radio calls from the commander of the garrison there, Colonel Christian de Castries.

De Castries: "The Viets are everywhere. The situation is very grave. The combat is confused and goes on all about. I feel the end is approaching, but we will fight to the finish."

Cogny: "Well understood. You will fight to the end. It is out of the question to run up the white flag after your heroic resistance."

And:

De Castries: "I'm blowing up the installations. The ammunition dumps are already exploding. Au revoir."

Cogny: "Well, then, au revoir, mon vieux." (literally 'my old one', more commonly translated as 'my friend', 'my fellow' or the phrase 'old man' in a sense of friendship)

By nightfall, all French central positions had been captured and Dien Bien Phu had fallen.

=== African command and death ===
After Indochina, Cogny went on to become a lieutenant general. In January 1957, an assassination attempt on General Raoul Salan in Algeria was revealed to have been executed by a former French paratrooper intending to have Salan replaced by Cogny, who nevertheless went on to become commander of French forces in Central Africa by 1963. On 11 September 1968, while flying across the Mediterranean, Cogny's Air France Sud Aviation Caravelle crashed near Nice. Cogny was killed in the crash along with 94 others.

== Command style ==
Cogny is seen by historians to have had a particular style of military pomp during his time in Vietnam. Bernard B. Fall remarked that it took "a special kind of guts and dash" to fulfill Cogny's role during the conflict. As well as "Le General Vitesse", Cogny was known to his men as 'Coco the Siren' due to his use of motorcycle outriders with sirens. He was a popular commander with his men, and particularly with journalists with whom he often dealt in place of his more reclusive superiors. Cogny focused his interest on the Tonkin Delta region where his troops were stationed, calling himself "Delta Man". On 7 June 1954 Cogny was the subject of an article in Time Magazine with the title "Delta General." Despite his popularity, Cogny was said to be "sensitive to criticism" and had a tendency to "brood on real or imagined injuries." He is criticsed by Roy as having focused overly on blaming Navarre for defeat in Indochina rather than working on a solution.
