= Operation Léa =

1947 French operation in the First Indochina War

Coordinates: 22.1333°N 105.8331°E

- Part of First Indochina War
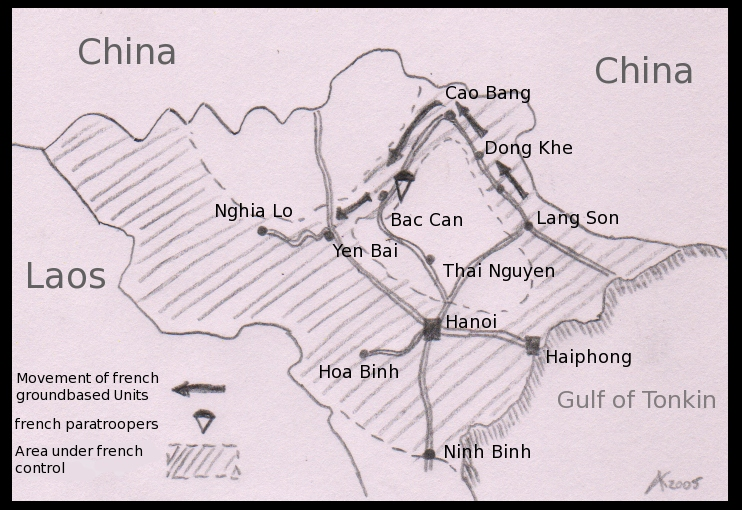
- The French military operation Léa in autumn 1947
Date	7 October – 8 November 1947
Location	Việt Bắc area, Vietnam
Result	French operational failure

Belligerents
French Union	Việt Minh

Commanders and leaders
Jean Étienne Valluy	Võ Nguyên Giáp

Strength
15,000	20,000

Casualties and losses
242 killed 586 wounded 43 missing or drowned Vietnamese claims: 3,300 killed 3,900 wounded 270 surrendered 18 aircraft destroyed 54 riverine crafts destroyed 255 tanks/APCs destroyed 25 artillery pieces captured	260 killed 168 wounded Western estimate: 7,200 killed 1,000 captured

Operation Léa was a French Union military operation between 7 October and 8 November 1947 during the First Indochina War. It is also known as the Việt Bắc campaign (Chiến Dịch Việt Bắc) by the Viet Minh. It was an attempt by the French General Valluy to crush the Việt Minh. An airborne force would capture the Việt Minh leadership and three French columns would strike into the Việt Minh heartland.

The parachute assault surprised the Việt Minh, nearly capturing Ho Chi Minh and Võ Nguyên Giáp, but it soon recovered and began ambushing the three French columns. The operation was soon called off and the French forces withdrew to the lowlands. It was a tactical success, inflicting severe casualties on the Việt Minh but was strategically inconclusive because it failed to capture the Việt Minh leadership or seriously cripple its military forces.

== Background ==
After the outbreak of hostilities on 19 December 1946, the French Union forces had made significant progress by capturing the cities of Haiphong, Hanoi, Lạng Sơn, Cao Bằng and most of the western and southern regions of Tonkin, which was the stronghold of the Việt Minh movement. The reasons for the fast advance were the superior firepower, naval and air support of the French forces. The main force of the Việt Minh was nearly surrounded by the French in the eastern part of Tonkin. There remained only a greater gap between the towns of Cao Bằng in the north and Yên Bái in the south. During April 1947 Ho Chi Minh made a last attempt to achieve a ceasefire and to continue the independence negotiations with the French government from 1948. The French only demanded his surrender, because the position of the Vietnamese forces seemed to be desperate. On 26 April, Ho refused the French, offering: "In the French Union is no place for cowards. I would be one, if I would accept." During the spring and the summer, the French attacked the bases of the Việt Minh troops in Tonkin but could not bring them to battle; the Việt Minh returned when the French moved on.

The French supreme command in Indochina under General Jean-Étienne Valluy realized that the tactic of minor assaults to locate the headquarters of the Việt Minh would not lead to an end of the war. From their intelligence department, they received some information that the location of the headquarters of the Việt Minh was in the city of Bắc Kạn. The French planned to capture Ho Chi Minh and the staff of the Việt Minh and destroy the main military force of the Việt Minh to gain a decisive victory over the Vietnamese independence movement.

== History ==
=== Operation Léa ===
Operation Léa began on 7 October, with the landing of 1,100 paratroopers at the city of Bắc Kạn. The paratroopers swiftly took control over the city but failed to capture Ho Chi Minh and the other Vietnamese leaders. Losing the opportunity to neutralize the Việt Minh leadership, the French paratroopers found themselves fighting for survival as the Việt Minh counter-attacked and surrounded them.

Ten French battalions of French troops (about 15,000 men) had started moving at the same time from the city of Lạng Sơn to Cao Bằng in the north and then down through Nguyen Binh to Bắc Kạn, to cut off supplies to the Việt Minh from China. The second objective was to surround the Vietnamese forces and destroy them in battle. Delayed by bad roads, mines and ambushes, it took the French column until 13 October to reach the vicinity of Bắc Kạn, where the Việt Minh put up a strong resistance. The French broke through on 16 October and relieved the paratroops. A four battalion riverine force that was supposed to assault up the Clear and Gam rivers encountered so many delays that they played no useful part in the battle. The French were unable to destroy the Việt Minh forces and most of the 40,000 guerrillas escaped through gaps in the French lines, including Ho Chi Minh and his staff with General Võ Nguyên Giáp. On 8 November, the operation was called off.

Although the main objective was not achieved, the operation allowed the reopening of RC 4 to Cao Bang, RC3 on the Cao Bang Bac Kan section as well as the reoccupation of the Nguyen Binh area rich in minerals. This big French victory caused the Trần Quốc Tuấn infantry school, the Voice of Vietnam station, the state treasury, and 10 weapons factories of the Việt Minh to be disbanded, and many warehouses of the communist Việt Minh military equipment were also confiscated.

== Aftermath ==
After failing to destroy the Việt Minh insurgency led by Ho Chi Minh and Vo Nguyen Giap (Operation Léa and later Operation Ceinture), the French supreme command changed tactics again. For financial and economic reasons, France was not able to send more troops to Indochina. The French began to establish outposts on the major roads (Route Coloniale 4 and Route Coloniale 3), to restrict the Việt Minh movement in north-east Tonkin but the Việt Minh was easily able to slip through the cordons and reinforce themselves from across the Chinese border. This would take the war from the stalemate into the first Việt Minh victories from 1949–1950.
