= 2nd Military Region (People's Army of Vietnam) =

Military region of the People's Army of Vietnam

Coordinates: 21°19′57″N 105°18′13″E

Quân khu 2 (2nd Military Region)
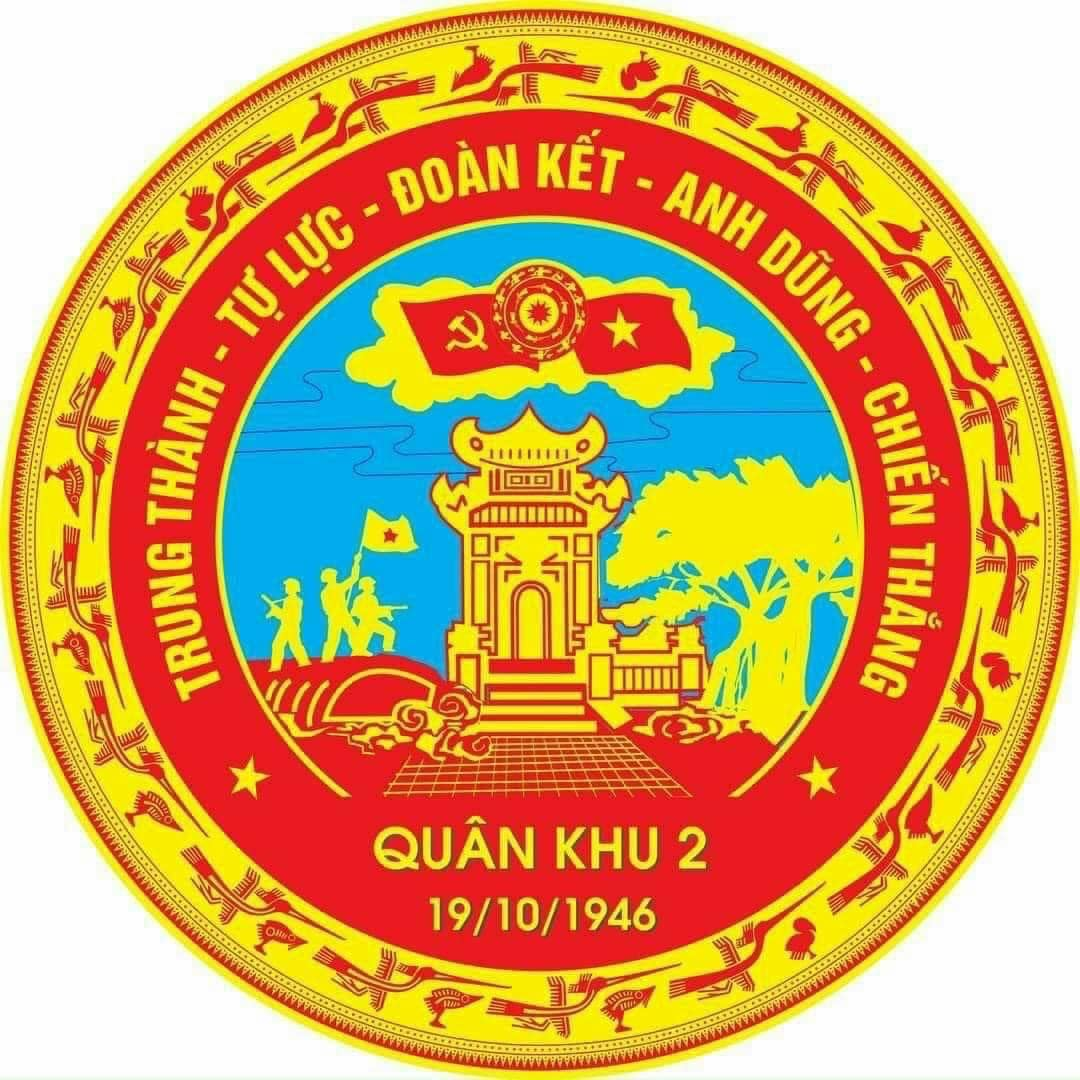
- Military Region emblem
- Active: 19 October 1946 (as 10th War Zone); 21 June 1978 - present (as 2nd Military Region)
- Country: Vietnam
- Allegiance: People's Army of Vietnam
- Branch: Active duty
- Role: Regular force
- Size: Equivalent to Corps
- Part of: People's Army of Vietnam
- Garrison/HQ: Việt Trì, Phú Thọ Province
- Engagements: First Indochina War; Vietnam War; Sino-Vietnamese War
- Decorations: Gold Star Order

Commanders
- Current commander: Major General Trần Văn Bắc
- Political commissar: Lieutenant General Phạm Đức Duyên

The 2nd Military Region of the Vietnam People's Army is directly under the Ministry of Defence of Vietnam, and is tasked with the organisation, management and creation of armed forces defending Northwest Vietnam. The north-West region of Vietnam, borders with the Yunnan of China. In 1979, the Chinese army with 3 infantry corps, and 10 infantry divisions, launched a huge invasion in this military zone and occupied Lào Cai Province and Phong Thổ.

== Agencies ==
- Headquarters of Staff
  - 15th Guard Battalion
  - 20th Reconnaissance Battalion
  - 19th Commando Battalion
  - 22nd Artillery Command Battalion
  - 97th Electronic Warfare Battalion
  - 39th Chemical Defense Battalion
  - 1st Intelligence Detachment
  - 2nd Intelligence Detachment
  - 3rd Intelligence Detachment
  - 5th Intelligence Detachment
  - 16th Technical Reconnaissance Detachment
- Department of Politics
- Department of Logistics - Technical
  - 6th Military Hospital
  - 109th Military Hospital
  - Preventive Healthcare Team
  - 652nd Transportation Regiment
  - T10 Warehouse
  - K5 Warehouse
  - K28 Warehouse
  - K79 Warehouse
  - X78 Workshop
  - Measurement & Inspection Station
- 2nd Military Region Military School

== Subordinate units ==
- Military Command of Lào Cai Province
  - Border Guard Command of Lào Cai
  - 7th Infantry Regiment
  - 8th Infantry Regiment
  - 121st Infantry Regiment
  - 254th Infantry Regiment
  - 2 Mechanized Reconnaissance Companies (BTR-152)
  - Engineer Company
- Military Command of Lai Châu Province
  - Border Guard Command of Lai Châu
  - 9th Infantry Regiment
  - 10th Infantry Regiment
  - 880th Infantry Regiment
  - Mechanized Reconnaissance Company (BTR-152)
  - Guard - Military Police Platoon
  - Signals Company
  - Engineer Company
- Military Command of Điện Biên Province
  - Border Guard Command of Điện Biên
  - 11th Infantry Regiment
  - 12th Infantry Regiment
  - 741st Infantry Regiment
  - Mechanized Reconnaissance Company (BTR-152)
  - Signals Company
  - Engineer Company
- Military Command of Sơn La Province
  - Border Guard Command of Sơn La
  - 13th Infantry Regiment
  - 14th Infantry Regiment
  - 754th Infantry Regiment
  - Mechanized Reconnaissance Company (BTR-152)
  - Signals Company
  - Engineer Company
- Military Command of Tuyên Quang Province
  - Border Guard Command of Tuyên Quang
  - 15th Infantry Regiment
  - 16th Infantry Regiment
  - 247th Infantry Regiment
  - 877th Infantry Regiment
  - 2 Mechanized Reconnaissance Companies (BTR-152)
  - Signals Company
  - Engineer Company
- Military Command of Phú Thọ Province
  - 753rd Infantry Regiment
  - 814th Infantry Regiment
  - 834th Infantry Regiment
  - 3 Mechanized Reconnaissance Companies (BTR-152)
  - Signals Company
  - Engineer Company
  - K93 Warehouse (ZPU-1)
- 304th Division
  - 9th Infantry Regiment
  - 24th Infantry Regiment
  - 66th Infantry Regiment
  - 18th Signals Battalion
- 316th Division
  - 98th Infantry Regiment
  - 148th Infantry Regiment
  - 174th Infantry Regiment
  - 15th Anti-tank Battalion (SPG-9)
- 355th Division
  - 82nd Infantry Regiment
  - 192nd Infantry Regiment
  - 752nd Infantry Regiment
- 406th Tank Brigade
  - 1st Tank Battalion (T-54/T-55 tank)
  - 2nd Tank Battalion (T-54/T-55, PT-76 tank)
  - 3rd Armored Battalion (Type 63 APC)
  - 18th Signals Company
  - 20th Reconnaissance Company (BRDM-2)
  - 38th Repair Company
- 168th Artillery Brigade
  - 1st Artillery Battalion (D-20 howitzer)
  - 2nd Artillery Battalion (D-30 howitzer)
  - 3rd Artillery Battalion (BM-21 MLRS)
  - Artillery Command Company
- 604th Signals Brigade
  - 1st Signals Battalion (radio communication)
  - 2nd Signals Battalion (wired communication)
  - 3nd Signals Battalion (specialized signal vehicle & SATCOM)
- 297th Air Defense Brigade
  - 1st Air Defense Battalion (AZP S-60)
  - 2nd Air Defense Battalion (AZP S-60)
  - 3rd Air Defense Battalion (Type 65 anti-aircraft guns)
- 543rd Engineer Brigade (PMP floating bridge, BMK-T motor boats)
- 313th Economic - Defense Group
- 326th Economic - Defense Group
- 345th Economic - Defense Group - during the 1979 Sino-Vietnamese War, the 345th Division had converted from an economic construction group to a fighting division.
- 379th Economic - Defense Group

=== Independent units ===
- 113th Commando Brigade of Special Forces Arms (Phú Thọ Province)
- 134th Signals Brigade of Signals Arms (HQ: Phú Thọ Province, stationed along northern and central provinces of Vietnam)
  - 4th Signals Battalion
  - 41st Signals Battalion
  - 81st Signals Battalion
  - 82nd Signals Battalion
  - 88th Signals Battalion
- 139th Signals Brigade of Signals Arms (HQ: Phú Thọ Province, stationed along northern provinces of Vietnam and parts of Hanoi)
  - 2nd Signals Battalion
  - 3rd Signals Battalion
  - 54th Signals Battalion
  - 60th Signals Battalion
- 72nd Engineer Brigade of Engineering Arms (Phú Thọ Province)
  - 1st Engineer Battalion
  - 2nd Engineer Battalion
  - 3rd Engineer Battalion
  - 4th Engineer Battalion
- K850 Warehouse of Armaments Department (M101 howitzer, 61-K anti-aircraft gun) (Phú Thọ Province)

== Successive Commander and Leadership ==
=== Commander ===
- Major General (1974), Lieutenant General (1980), Colonel General (1984) Vũ Lập (1978–1987):
- Lieutenant General Ma Thanh Toàn (–2007)
- Lieutenant General Đỗ Bá Tỵ (2007–2010)
- Major General Dương Đức Hòa (2010–2016)
- Major General Lê Xuân Duy (2016–2016)
- Lieutenant General Phùng Sĩ Tấn (2016–2019)
- Lieutenant General Phạm Hồng Chương (2019–2024)
- Major General Trần Văn Bắc (2024–present)

=== Political Commissioner ===
- Major General (1974), Lieutenant General (1980), Vũ Lập (1978–1981)
- Lieutenant General Trần Thụ (Deputy Commander of politics)
- Lieutenant General Lê Minh Cược (2006–2009)
- Lieutenant General Nguyễn Ngọc Liên (2009–2015)
- Major General Lê Hiền Vân (2015–2016)
- Lieutenant General Trịnh Văn Quyết (2016–2021)
- Lieutenant General Phạm Đức Duyên (2021–present)
