= Resolution for Victory Order =

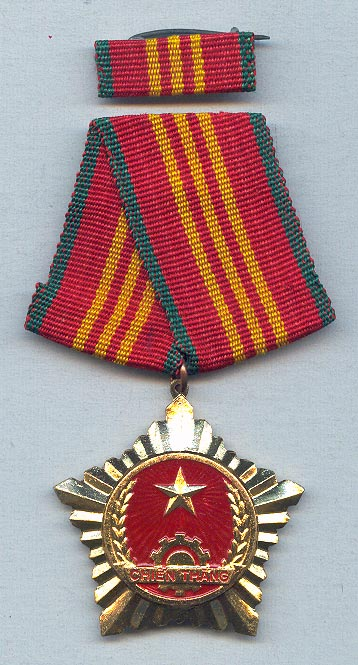
1st class Resolution for Victory Order

Resolution for Victory Order (Vietnamese: Huân chương Chiến thắng) is a Vietnamese military order. It was established in 1965 and ranked above the Resolution for Victory Decoration and below the Liberation Order.

It was given to generals Đoàn Khuê, Võ Nguyên Giáp, Trần Văn Trà among others during the Vietnam War to show resolve for victory by any means necessary. It is similar to other medals and badges awarded by North Vietnam during the era such as the Defeat American Aggression Badge.
