= Campaign to Suppress Bandits in Shiwandashan =

1950 military campaign

- Part of Chinese Civil War
Date	December 13, 1950 – February 1951
Location	Shiwandashan
Result	Communist victory

Belligerents
Flag of the National Revolutionary Army National Revolutionary Army	PLA People's Liberation Army

Commanders and leaders
Flag of the ROC Wei Xiuying 韦秀英; Wei Yuzhuang 韦雨庄	Flag of the PRC ?

Strength
31,000+	14,000

Casualties and losses
31,000+	Minor

The Campaign to Suppress Bandits in Shiwandashan was a counter-insurgency campaign the Chinese Communist Party fought against the Kuomintang forces that were left behind after the Nationalist regime withdrew from mainland China. The campaign was fought during the Chinese Civil War in the post-World War II era in the region of Shiwandashan (十万大山, literally "10,000 Great Mountains") in Guangxi at the China-Vietnam border and resulted in communist victory. The campaign was part of Campaign to Suppress Bandits in Guangxi, which in turn, was part of Campaign to Suppress Bandits in Central and Southern China.

== Order of battle ==
Nationalist:

- Anti-communist National Salvation Army at the Border Region of Guangdong and Guangxi

Communist:

- A regiment of the Longzhou Military Sub-District
- 129th Division
- 134th Division

== Campaign ==
After the Nationalist retreat, the Nationalist troops left behind recruited locals (referred to as "bandits") to wage guerilla warfare against PLA forces.

In early December 1950, communist force consisted of a regiment of the communist Longzhou Military Sub-District, the communist 129th Division and the communist 134th Division were tasked to eradicate the nationalists in the region. The original communist plan of attacking on December 20, 1950, was forced to be carried out early on December 13, 1950, when the intelligence revealed that the nationalists planned to withdraw to Vietnam. The nationalists attempted to break the encirclement by sending out a small force out of the encirclement to cross into Vietnam, but the attempt failed.

== Conclusion ==
By February 1951, the campaign concluded with communist victory, with nationalist commanders either killed or captured. The 31,000 strong nationalist guerrilla in Shiwandashan (十万大山) was presumed to have been killed in action. In addition, the communists reported the capture of 58 pieces of artillery, 33 machine guns, 39,844 firearms, and 3 radio sets.

== See also ==
- Outline of the Chinese Civil War
- National Revolutionary Army
- History of the People's Liberation Army
- Chinese Civil War
