= Chu Huy Mân =

General of People's Army of Vietnam (1913 – 2006)

Army General Chu Huy Mân
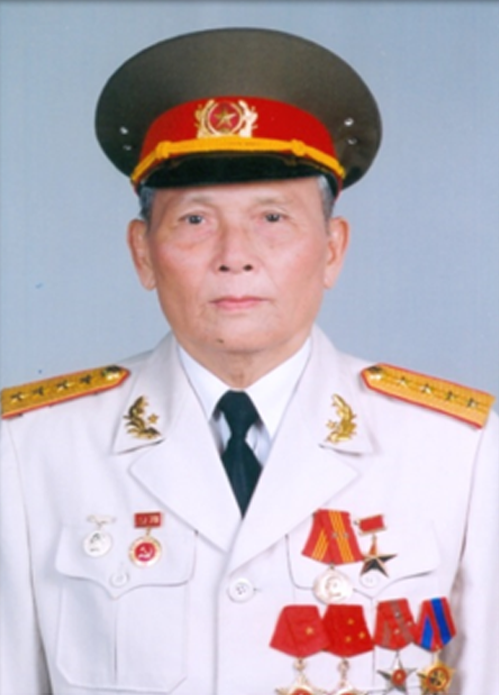

Deputy Chairman of the Council of State
- In office 4 July 1981 – December 1986 Serving with Nguyễn Hữu Thọ; Xuân Thủy; Lê Thanh Nghị
- Chairman: Trường Chinh

Personal details
- Born: Chu Văn Điều; 1913 Nghệ An, Annam (French protectorate)
- Died: 2006 (aged 92–93) Hà Nội, Việt Nam
- Party: Communist Party of Vietnam
- Nickname(s): Hai Mạnh, Tướng Thao Chăn

Military service
- Allegiance: Democratic Republic of Vietnam and later Vietnam
- Branch/service: People's Army of Vietnam
- Rank: General
- Battles/wars: First Indochina War; Battle of Điện Biên Phủ; Vietnam War; Siege of Plei Me; Hue–Da Nang Campaign

Chu Huy Mân (Vietnamese pronunciation: [t͡ɕu˧˧ hwi˧˧ mən˧˧]; born Chu Văn Điều [t͡ɕu˧˧ van˧˧ ʔɗiəw˨˩]; 17 March 1913 – 1 July 2006) was a general in the People's Army of Vietnam active during the First Indochina War and Vietnam War. He commanded Việt Cộng forces in Siege of Plei Me.

== Early life ==
Chu Huy Mân was born 17 March 1913 as Chu Văn Điều, the youngest of the eight children of a poor family in Hưng Nguyên fu, Nghệ An province of Annam (French protectorate). He started acting in revolutionary movements since 1929, joined Indochinese Communist Party in November 1930, and acted actively in the Nghệ-Tĩnh Soviets.

In 1935, Chu Văn Điều changed his name to Chu Huy Mân. In 1936, Mân was named the secretary of the party committee of Hưng Nguyên district. During 1937–1940, he was arrested by the French authorities many times in Vinh city. In 1940, he was imprisoned in Ðắc Glei Prison, then transferred to Kon Tum Prison. Mân escaped from prison in 1943, continued to take part in revolutionary activities in Quảng Nam Province, joined the provincial Party committee in September 1944.

== Military career ==
During the First Indochina War, Chu Huy Mân was assigned to deputy political commissar, then political commissar of 316th Division from 1951 to 1954.

During the Vietnam War, he held the position of political commissar of Military Region 4, then political commissar of Military Region 5 from 1954 to 1965.

== Political career ==
At the 4th National Congress of the Party in 1976, he was elected to the Central Executive Committee and the Central Committee elected him as a member of the Politburo, holding the position of Deputy Secretary of the Central Military Commission, Head of the Inspection Committee of the CCentral Military Commission, Director of the General Political Department (1977-1986), in charge of assisting the Lao Revolution, Director of the Ho Chi Minh National Academy of Politics (in 1980).

He was a Member of the National Assembly in the 2nd, 6th, and 7th terms, elected by the National Assembly as Deputy Chairman of the State Council in the 7th term (1981-1986), a member of the Central Committee of the Communist Party of Vietnam in the 3rd, 4th, and 5th terms, and a member of the Politburo in the 4th and 5th terms. After the sixth congress, he retired.

== Later life ==
On January 21, 1995, President Le Duc Anh awarded him Gold Star Order. He passed away on July 1, 2006 at the Central Military Hospital 108. He was buried at Mai Dịch Cemetery in Hanoi.
