= Phạm Xuân Ẩn =

Vietnamese journalist, spy, and general

- Nicknames: Hai Trung, Trần Văn Trung, X6
- Born: September 12, 1927; Biên Hòa, French Indochina
- Died: September 20, 2006 (aged 79) Ho Chi Minh City, Vietnam
- Allegiance: Vietnam
- Branch: People's Army of Vietnam
- Rank: Major General
- Awards: Hero of the People's Armed ForcesOrder of IndependenceMilitary Exploit OrderFeat Order

Phạm Xuân Ẩn (born Phạm Văn Thành; September 12, 1927 – September 20, 2006) was a notable Vietnamese spy, journalist, and correspondent for Time, Reuters and the New York Herald Tribune, stationed in Saigon during the war in Vietnam. He was revealed to have simultaneously been spying for the National Liberation Front of South Vietnam (NLF) during the Vietnam War. After the war, he was promoted to the rank of general of the People's Army of Vietnam. His nicknames were Hai Trung and Trần Văn Trung. He was awarded the title of Hero of the People's Armed Forces by the Vietnamese government on January 15, 1976.

Ẩn still had to pay for being considered by the new government to be too close to the Americans; he went into a re-education camp for a year after the war, although he described it as a "softer" one.

== Early life and education ==
He was born Phạm Văn Thành in Binh Truoc, Biên Hòa, Đồng Nai Province. His parents were originally from Hải Dương Province. His grandfather was the headmaster of a school in Huế and was awarded the king of Vietnam's gold ring. Ẩn's father was a high-level engineer of the Public Administration Department, but his family's service to France did not earn them French citizenship. Phạm was born in Biên Hòa Hospital, where his mother was assisted by French doctors.

When Ẩn was a child, he lived with his family in Saigon. He joined the Viet Minh in 1944 at the age of 16 to fight against the Japanese during their invasion in World War II. Afterward he joined with other Vietnamese to overthrow the French colonial rule.

When the August Revolution began against the French government, Ẩn left school and joined the Volunteer Youth Organisation. Later, he took classes offered by the Viet Minh. He moved to Cần Thơ and studied at the College of Cần Thơ.

After the partition of Vietnam in 1954, Ẩn served in the southern Vietnamese National Army. He was later awarded a scholarship to a college in California. In the late 1950s, Ẩn attended Orange Coast College (OCC) and earned an Associate of Arts degree. He wrote for the campus newspaper, then called The Barnacle.

== Career ==
After his return to South Vietnam, Ẩn began working as a journalist. When the United States entered the Vietnam War, Ẩn was hired as a journalist and correspondent for Time, Reuters and the New York Herald Tribune, stationed in Saigon. According to The Fall of Saigon by David Butler and Flashbacks by Morley Safer, in 1975 Ẩn helped Tran Kim Tuyen, a South Vietnamese intelligence commander and CIA asset, escape Saigon on one of the last helicopters out of the city. During the fall of Saigon evacuations, Ẩn obtained transport for his wife and four children to the United States; it was provided by Time.

Shortly after the fall of Saigon, he was interrogated by the PAVN and put under house arrest to ensure he had no further contact with Westerners. He was suspected of being "corrupted" by capitalism after decades of living in South Vietnam as a spy.

Phạm Xuân Ẩn was awarded the Hero of the People's Armed Forces in 1976. Much later in life, he was promoted in 1990 to Major General. Ẩn died in 2006 in Ho Chi Minh City in a military hospital from complications of emphysema.

== Representation in other media ==
In 1989, Ẩn had an extensive interview with American journalist Morley Safer, which Safer described in his book Flashbacks. Ẩn said that in 1960, he joined Reuters and later Time, when he was made a colonel in the NLF. He claimed to have passed information periodically through secret meetings in the Ho Bo Woods near Saigon during the Vietnam War and said that only a handful of NLF fighters knew about his identity as a spy. Safer writes that Ẩn was close with such noted journalists as Charles Mohr, Frank McCulloch, David Greenway, Richard Clurman, Bob Shaplen, and Nguyen Hung Vuong.

Safer described Ẩn as a "dignified and decent man" but also noted his "enigma" and "layers". Safer noted Arnaud de Borchgrave testified in 1981 before Senator Jeremiah Denton's subcommittee that Ẩn had a "mission" to "disinform the Western press". Ẩn denied the disinformation charge, claiming his superiors felt such tactics would have given him away. Safer and Ẩn discussed Ẩn's year-long imprisonment in a re-education/lecture camp near Hanoi by the North Vietnamese after the end of the war because of his connection with Americans. Ẩn also described his opinion of the "paternalism and a discredited economy theory" being used by the Vietnamese leadership that had led to the failure of the revolution to help "the people".

Thomas A. Bass wrote The Spy Who Loved Us: The Vietnam War and Pham Xuan An's Dangerous Game (2009) about the journalist and spy.
