= Nguyễn Tài Thu =

Vietnamese physician (1931–2021)

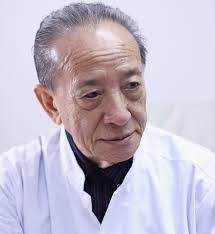
- Born: 6 April 1931; Vân Canh, Hoài Đức, Hanoi
- Died: 14 February 2021 (aged 89); Hanoi, Vietnam
- Education: Hanoi Medical University (1952-1958)
- Years active: 1958-2021
- Known for: Acupuncture Analgesia; Long-needled Acupuncture; Acupuncture for Paralysis
- Relatives: Đinh Lệ Mạnh (spouse); 2 daughters Nguyễn Minh Quân (deceased son)
- Medical career
- Profession: Doctor
- Field: Medicine; Acupuncture
- Institutions: Vietnam Acupuncture Association (founder); Vietnam Institute of Acupuncture (founder); Vietnam National Hospital of Acupuncture (former director); World Federation of Acupuncture Societies (former vice president); Vietnam Relief Association for Handicapped Children (former president)
- Awards: People's Physician (1995); 1st class Labor Order (1999); Hero of Labor (2000); 2nd class Independence Order (2004); 1st and 3rd class Resistance Order; Great National Unity Order (2014); National Award in science and technology Fight until die Order; Victory Order; People's Health Order

Nguyễn Tài Thu (6 April 1931 – 14 February 2021) was a Vietnamese physician, well-known for his specialty in traditional Chinese medicine (TCM), notably acupuncture treatment. He was awarded various titles. He also had relations with 38 different countries in the world about science technology and was a professor and honorary doctor of 16 overseas universities. Because of his achievements in research and application, he was then called The King of Acupuncture, etc.

== Biography ==
Professor Thu was born on 6 April 1931 in a rural village of Kim Hoàng, Vân Canh commune, Hoài Đức District, Hanoi to a Confucian family. In the 1940s, when Hanoi was attacked by many bullets and bombs, after witnessing many injured and dead people because of war, he dreamed of becoming a doctor in order to treat them. In 1952, he followed his dream to become a acupuncturist, he then first tried learning to insert acupuncture needles in himself and finally inserting them in people. In 1953, after studying the first year in Resistance Medical University (now called Hanoi Medical University), he was sent to China to study traditional Chinese medicine for 6 years. He graduated as TCM doctor in 1958, and came back to Vietnam to serve several local military hospitals. In the end of 1950s, he invented a new acupuncture technique which later was called tân châm, literally means renew acupuncture. By the year of 1967, he conducted deeply his field research inside a clinic of Hanoi TCM Association. He began researching by trying to insert needles of different lengths to cure. The first Vietnam Acupuncture Association was established by his proposal in year 1968. After that, Professor Thu and colleagues developed their association from zero to nearly ten thousand members and trained hundreds of acupuncturists with postgraduate qualifications. To now, hospitals in Vietnam all have acupuncture subjects. The Vietnam Acupuncture Institute was also founded by him in 1982 and has become a familiar place for international acupuncture scientists.

He was fluent in French, Mandarin, and English and taught many students, experts in Asia, Europe and South America. He also founded several medical and technology transferring centers in Russia, France, Mexico, Italy, etc.

== Achievements ==
His biggest achievement is many books focusing on each type of acupuncture, which are the useful handbooks for doctors and acupuncturists. Specially, the numb acupuncture and drug addiction treatment acupuncture (which was also applied by Ministry of Health, resulting in 5% to 10% of drug re-addicted people) were introduced to 50 countries. He also applied successfully long-needle technique of acupuncture with the needle length of over 60 centimeters to insert into acupuncture points that are deep in the body to cure disease.

In the late 1950s, he invented tân châm (renew acupuncture), which is a acupuncture technique using longer and bigger needles than traditional acupuncture technique. The traditional one uses 1 to 5 centimeters length needles while the renew one uses 30 to 50 centimeters length needles that are needed for deep acupuncture points to create huge impact and shorten treatment time.

His electroacupuncture technique to relieve pain on surgery was performed in over 100,000 surgeries including 60 different types of surgery with the cure rate of 98.3%. At the ICMART Xi World Medical Acupuncture Congress which took place on 4 October 2004 in Sydney, Australia, the drug addiction treatment acupuncture technique was the first one of 280 research papers that was welcomed warmly. The Chinese delegate also recognized the success of the work. The work was then accepted by Ministry of Health of Vietnam and he directly applied the procedures in training courses in 21 provinces and was continuing to be deployed on a large scale.

Professor Thu was rewarded with many titles by Party and state such as People's Physician (1995), 1st class Labor Order (1999), Hero of Labor (2000), etc.

On 8 March 2006, Professor Thu was awarded an honorary doctorate by Autonomous University of Zacatecas (UAZ), to recognize the professor's contributions to the development of local acupuncture therapeutic services in Zacatecas state, Mexico.
