= Phạm Minh Chính =

Prime Minister of Vietnam from 2021 to 2026

Lieutenant General; Phạm Minh Chính
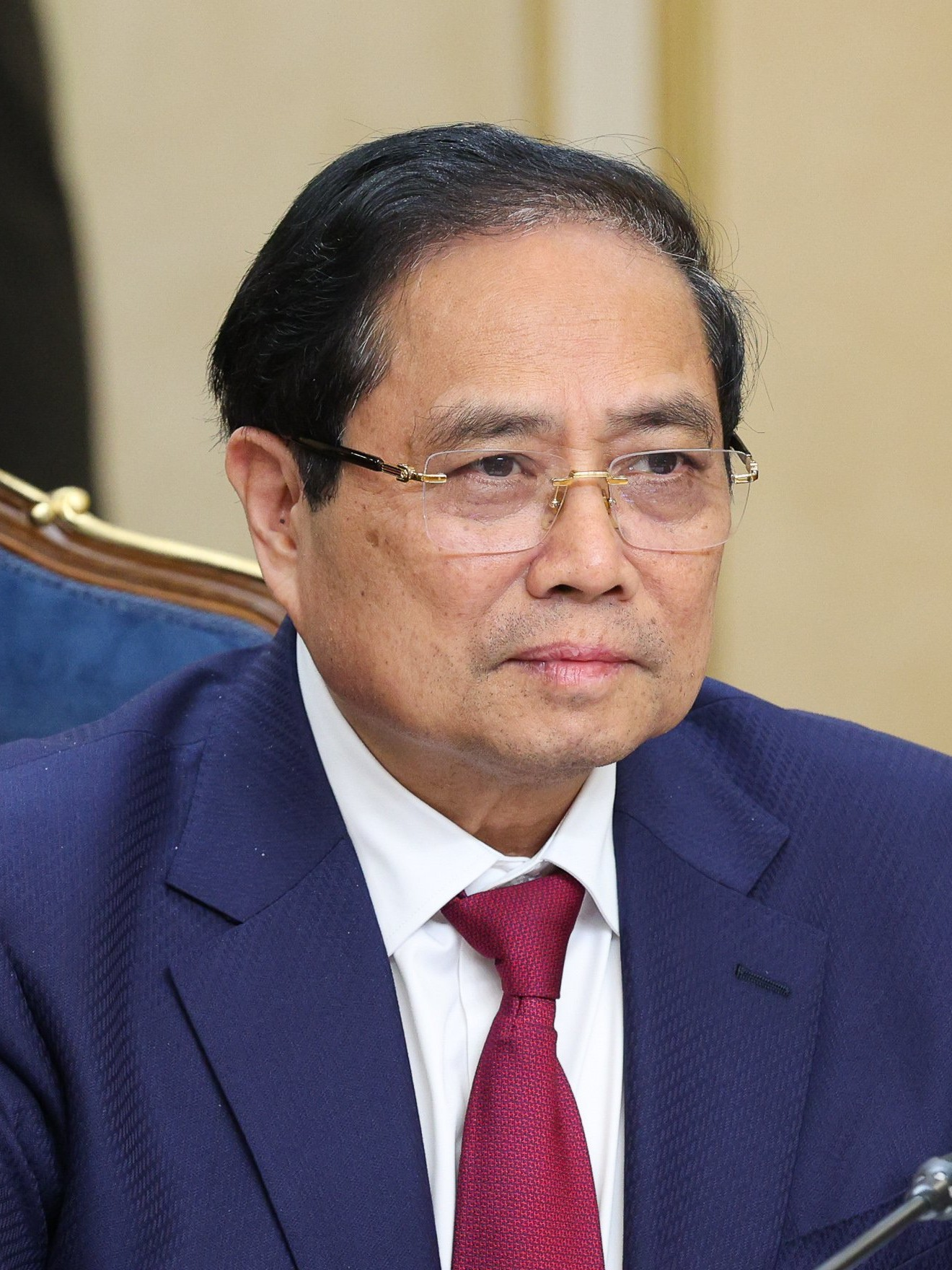
- Chính in 2026

8th Prime Minister of Vietnam
- In office 5 April 2021 – 7 April 2026
- President: See list: Nguyễn Xuân Phúc; Võ Thị Ánh Xuân (acting); Võ Văn Thưởng; Võ Thị Ánh Xuân (acting); Tô Lâm; Lương Cường
- Deputy: Phạm Bình Minh; Nguyễn Hòa Bình
- Preceded by: Nguyễn Xuân Phúc
- Succeeded by: Lê Minh Hưng

Head of the Party Organizing Commission
- In office 5 February 2016 – 8 April 2021
- Preceded by: Tô Huy Rứa
- Succeeded by: Trương Thị Mai

Other offices held: 24 August 2021 – 29 October 2023: Head for Covid-19 Response; 8 April 2021 – present: Vice Chairman of the National Defense and Security Council; 4 February 2016 – 31 January 2021: Member of the Secretariat of the Communist Party's Central Committee; 27 January 2016 – present: Member of the Politburo; 8 August 2011 – 9 April 2015: Secretary of Quang Ninh Provincial Party Committee; 18 January 2011 – present: Member of the Communist Party Central Committee

Personal details
- Born: 10 December 1958 (age 67) Hậu Lộc, Thanh Hoá, North Vietnam
- Party: Communist Party of Vietnam (1982–present)
- Spouse: Lê Thị Bích Trân
- Education: Hanoi University; Technical University of Civil Engineering of Bucharest; Ho Chi Minh National Academy of Politics
- Awards: Labor Order; Military Exploit Order; Feat Order; Glorious Fighter Medal
- Website: primeminister.chinhphu.vn

Military service
- Branch/service: Vietnam People's Public Security
- Years of service: 1985–2011
- Rank: Lieutenant general

Phạm Minh Chính (Vietnamese: [faːm˧˨ʔ mïŋ˧˧ t͡ɕïŋ˧˦]; born 10 December 1958) is a Vietnamese politician and former public security lieutenant general. He served as the eighth prime minister of Vietnam from 2021 to 2026, and ranked third in the Communist Party after General Secretary Tô Lâm and President Lương Cường.

A member of the Politburo since 2016, Chính is also the Vice Chairman of the National Defense and Security Council of Vietnam. He is a Member of the National Assembly and held the rank of Lieutenant General in the People's Public Security Forces.

Prior to his premiership, Chính was the Head of the Party's Central Organizing Commission, Head of the Committee of Internal Political Protection and a former Member of the Secretariat of the Communist Party (2016–2021). He also served as the Party Secretary (de facto Governor) of Quảng Ninh province (2011–2015), Deputy Minister of Public Security (2010–2011), Head of the MPS General Department of Logistics and Technology (2010) and Deputy Head of the MPS General Department of Intelligence (2006–2009).

He holds a Bachelor of Civil Engineering, a Doctor of Law, and an Advanced Degree in Political Theory. Chính holds the academic rank of Associate Professor in National Security Studies.

On 5 April 2021, Chính became the prime minister of Vietnam, succeeding Nguyễn Xuân Phúc. The first year of his premiership was overshadowed by the resurgence of COVID-19 in Vietnam around April 2021. As the Head of the COVID-19 National Steering Committee, he was dubbed the "Commander-in-chief" in Vietnam's response to the pandemic alongside Nguyễn Xuân Phúc. Thanks to the nationwide vaccination strategy, Vietnam reopened its economy and registered positive GDP growth for 2021 before breaking a record high rate in 2022. In foreign affairs, his government has established close relationships with many countries, including upgrades in diplomatic relations with Australia and the United States.

== Early life and education ==
Phạm Minh Chính was born on 10 December 1958, in the commune of Hoa Lộc, Hậu Lộc district, Thanh Hóa province, North Vietnam, in a family of eight siblings. His father was a local cadre and civil servant, and his mother was a farmer. In 1963, he followed his family to build a New Economic Zone in the town of Phong Sơn, Cẩm Thủy, Thanh Hóa. As a child, he attended Cẩm Thủy High School. After graduating from high school in 1975, he studied at Hanoi University of Foreign Studies (now Hanoi University).

In 1976, he was sent to the Socialist Republic of Romania to study at Technical University of Civil Engineering of Bucharest. He studied Romanian and majored in Civil Engineering. In 2000, he successfully defended his Doctor of Law thesis, becoming a Doctor of Law. On March 9, 2010, he was conferred the academic title of Associate Professor in Law.

Phạm Minh Chính was admitted to the Communist Party of Vietnam on December 25, 1986, and became an official member on December 25, 1987. He also attended courses at Hồ Chí Minh National Academy of Politics, receiving an Advanced Degree in Political Theory.

== Political career ==
In January 1985, Phạm Minh Chính became an Intelligence officer within the Department of Intelligence within the Ministry of Public Security. Among other roles, he served as an intelligence officer in the Department of Europe and America within the Department of Intelligence. In March 1991, Phạm Minh Chính became an officer of the Ministry of Foreign Affairs, working at the Vietnamese Embassy in Romania.

In November 1994, he returned to the Ministry of Public Security, becoming the Deputy Head of the Department of Europe. Between May 1999 and August 2010, he served as the Deputy Director of several departments. In August 2010, he became a member of the Central Committee of the Communist Party of Vietnam at the 11th Party Congress. He was re-elected at the 12th party congress in February 2015. In February 2016, he became a member of the Politburo of the Communist Party of Vietnam.

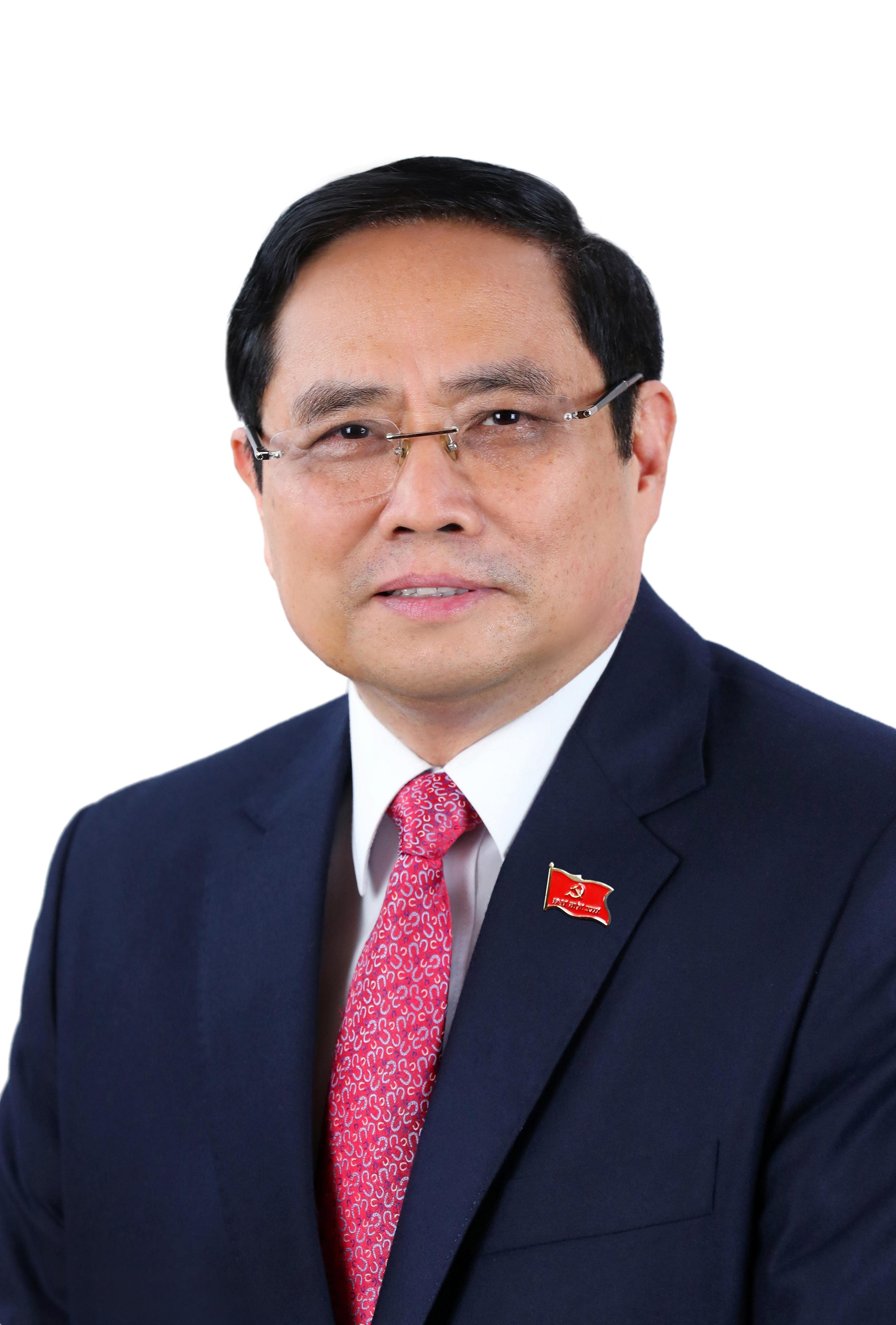
2021 portrait

== Premiership (2021–2026) ==
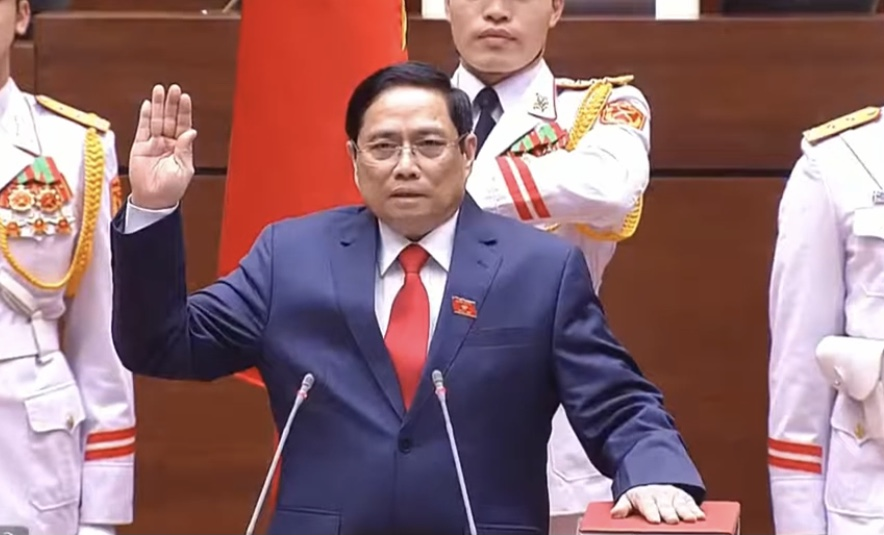
Chính takes the oath of office on 4 May 2021

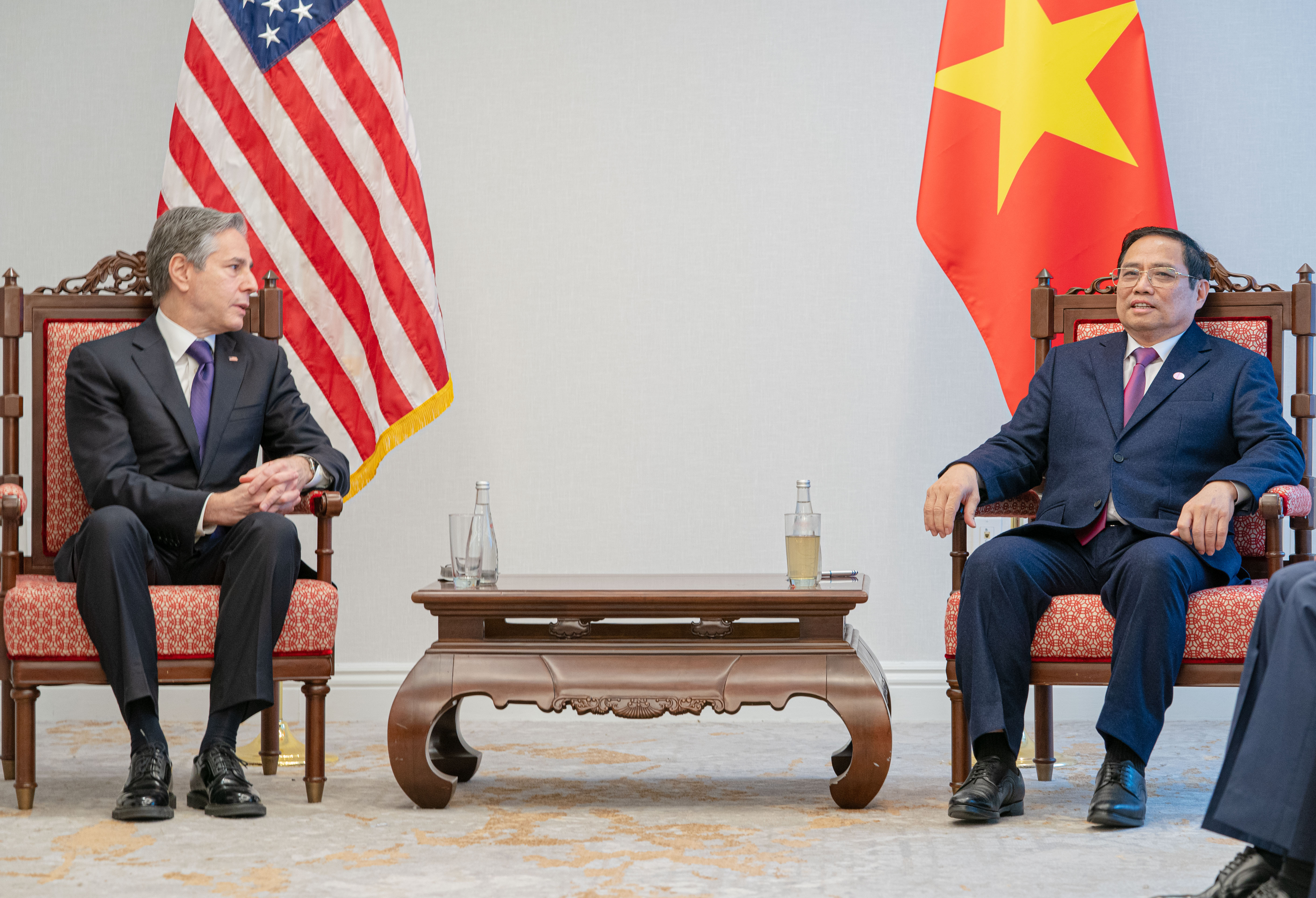
Phạm Minh Chính with U.S. Secretary of State Antony Blinken in May 2022

In early 2021, the 13th National Congress of the Communist Party of Vietnam took place. Foreign media suggested before and during the congress that Pham Minh Chinh would be the most likely new Prime Minister of Vietnam after the 13th National Congress of the Communist Party of Vietnam.

On 5 April 2021, he was elected as Prime Minister of Vietnam at the 11th working session of the 14th National Assembly.

On 26 July 2021, at the first session of the 15th National Assembly, he was elected to hold the position of Prime minister of Vietnam term 2021-2026 with a rate of 96.99% (484/484 delegates present voted in favor, the total number of XV National Assembly delegates is 499 delegates).

On the afternoon of 28 July 2021, at the first session of the 15th National Assembly, with a total of 470/470 votes in favor, reaching 94.19% of the total number of delegates, the National Assembly passed Resolution approved him to concurrently hold the position of Vice Chairman of the Vietnam National Defense and Security Council.

=== COVID-19 pandemic ===
==== Fund for Prevention ====
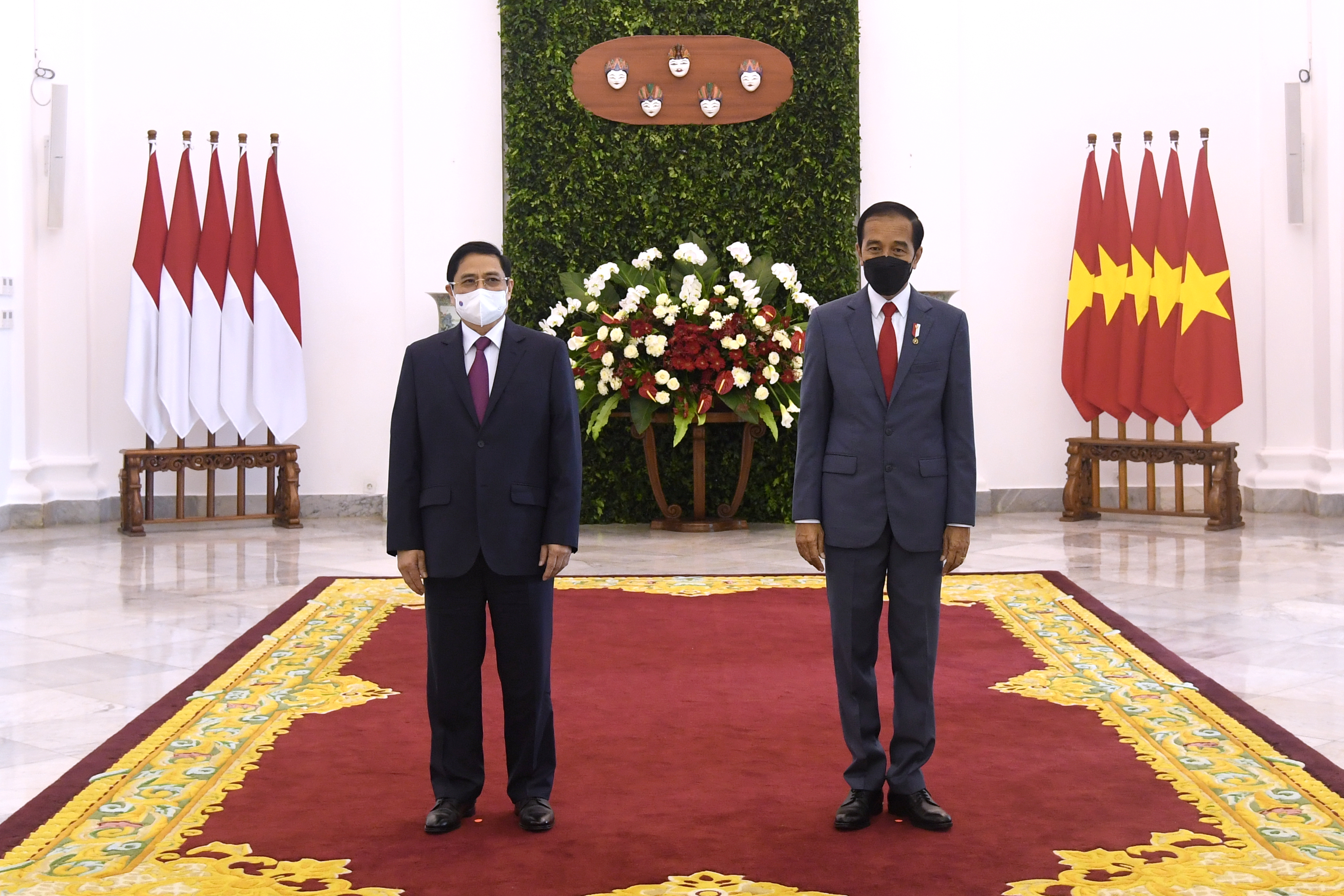
Prime Minister Phạm Minh Chính meets President of Indonesia Joko Widodo in 2021.

Faced with the increasingly complicated epidemic situation in Ho Chi Minh City, Prime Minister Phạm Minh Chính requested the Ministry of Public Security, the Ministry of National Defense, the Ministry of Transport, the Ministry of Health and a number of localities with experience to continued to support and prioritize aid for Ho Chi Minh City during the online meeting on the morning of July 4, 2021. In the face of the situation that Ho Chi Minh City recorded more than 13,000 infections and during the period of social distancing within 15 days when implementing Directive 16 from July 9, 2021, Prime Minister Phạm Minh Chính directed to prioritize 25% of the national vaccine reserves for the city.

With the increasingly complicated situation of the COVID-19 pandemic, Vietnam needed more than 150 million doses of COVID-19 vaccine to vaccinate about 75 million people, with total funding needs estimated at more than 25 thousand billion. However, the Vietnamese economy faced many difficulties, the need for funding for the purchase of vaccines is very large and the state budget is limited. Facing that situation, Prime Minister Phạm Minh Chính signed and promulgated Resolution 53/NQ-CP approving the establishment of a COVID-19 vaccine fund on May 27, 2021.

==== COVID-19 epidemic in southern provinces and cities ====
Facing the epidemic situation with increasing numbers of infections and complicated developments in the Southern provinces, Prime Minister Pham Minh Chinh signed Official Dispatch No. 969/TTg-KGVX dated 17 July 2021 on implementing social distancing to prevent, anti-epidemic in some localities (Ho Chi Minh City, Cần Thơ and provinces: Bình Dương, Đồng Nai has implemented, Bình Phước, Tây Ninh, Bà Rịa - Vũng Tàu, Tiền Giang, Long An, Vĩnh Long, Đồng Tháp, Bến Tre, Hậu Giang, An Giang, Bạc Liêu, Sóc Trăng, Trà Vinh, Cà Mau, Kiên Giang) according to Directive 16 with a social distancing period of 14 days starting at 12:00 a.m. 19 July 2021.

On 31 July 2021, Chính issued a telegram requesting southern provinces/cities to continue social distancing for an additional 14 days from 12:00 am on 2 August 2021 when the epidemic situation becomes extremely complicated. in the southern provinces after 14 days of social distancing from 19 July 2021 according to official dispatch No. 969/TTg-KGVX dated 17 July 2021.

==== Head of the National Steering Committee for COVID-19 Prevention and Control ====
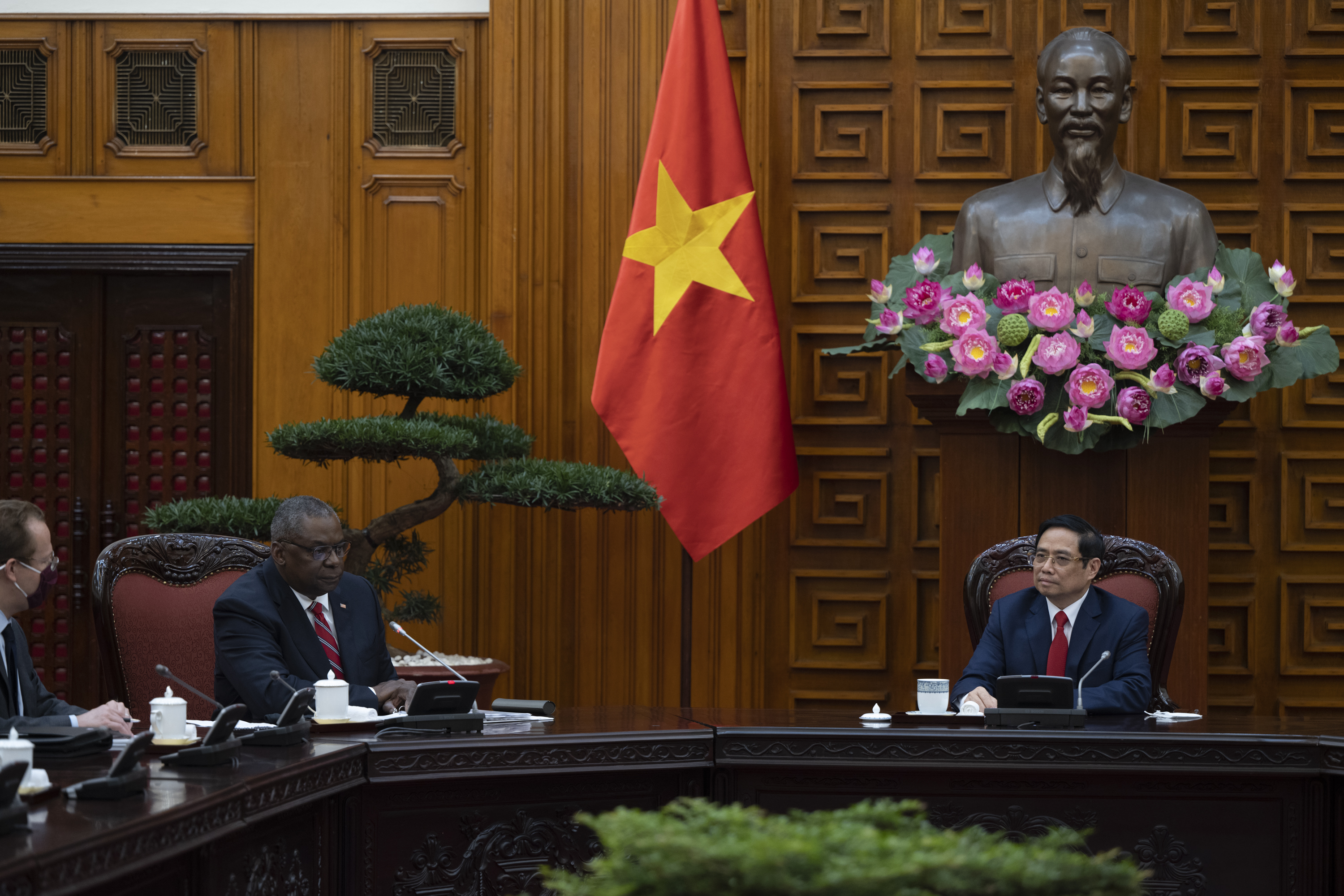
Chính meets US Secretary of Defense Lloyd J. Austin III

On 24 August 2021, at the Party Central Headquarters, a key leadership meeting on COVID-19 epidemic prevention and control took place. General Secretary Nguyễn Phú Trọng has reached a unanimous conclusion to assign Phạm Minh Chính as Head of the National Steering Committee for COVID-19 epidemic prevention.

Facing the situation of Ho Chi Minh City recording more than 190,800 cases of infection, Chính entered the city. Ho Chi Minh City inspects epidemic prevention in this city. He emphasized to the city leaders. HCM "must detect F0 early, reach out immediately for appropriate classification and treatment, including testing, prioritizing high-risk people on the morning of 25 August 2021.

=== Environment and climate change ===
On 13 October 2021, Phạm Minh Chính attended and spoke at the 4th "Russian Energy Week" Forum in video recording. At the forum, he said Vietnam is diversifying energy sources, focusing on developing clean and renewable energy sources, with the goal of increasing the proportion of total primary energy supply to at least 20%. by 2030 and 30% by 2045. To achieve these goals, Vietnam has issued many mechanisms to encourage the development of wind power, solar power, biomass power, electricity from solid waste. Regarding fossil energy sources, there is a proactive roadmap to actively reduce and hardly develop new coal-fired power plants. It is expected to strongly develop gas-fired power plants, including Both thermal power use domestic gas and liquefied petroleum gas (LNG). The proportion of gas power sources is expected to increase from 10% in 2020 to 21 - 22% in 2030. Using energy economically and efficiently, actively implementing the Paris Agreement on climate change, Vietnam has developed and promulgated a National Program on economical and efficient use of energy period 2019-2030 with the goal of saving 5-7% of total national energy consumption by 2025.

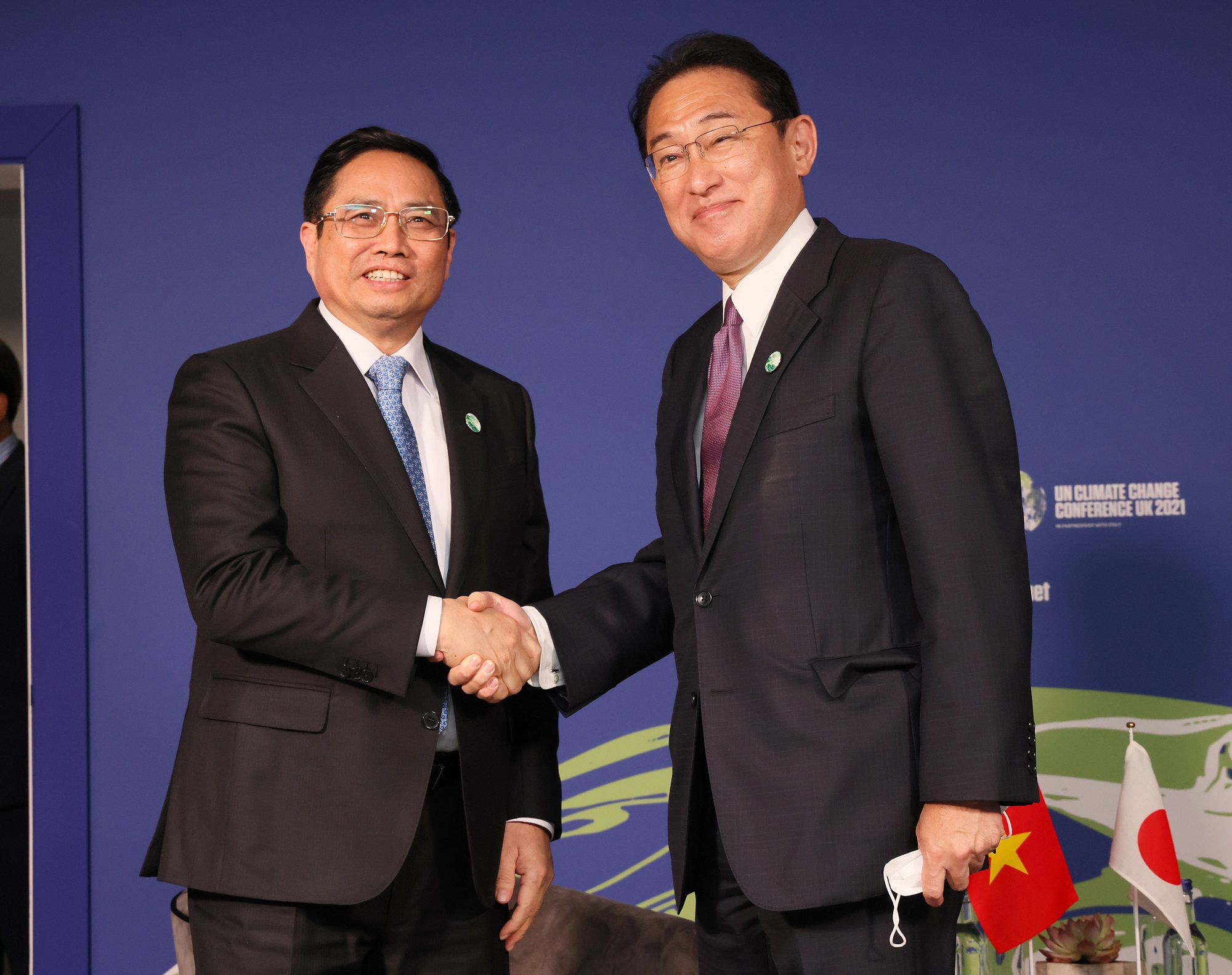
Chính and Prime minister of Japan Fumio Kishida

Phạm Minh Chính attended and delivered important speeches at the COP26 Conference, attended and spoke at events announcing the initiatives of a number of important partners on the sidelines of COP26 such as the announcement of the Global Methane Emission Reduction Commitment demand, action on forests and land use.

=== Foreign policy ===
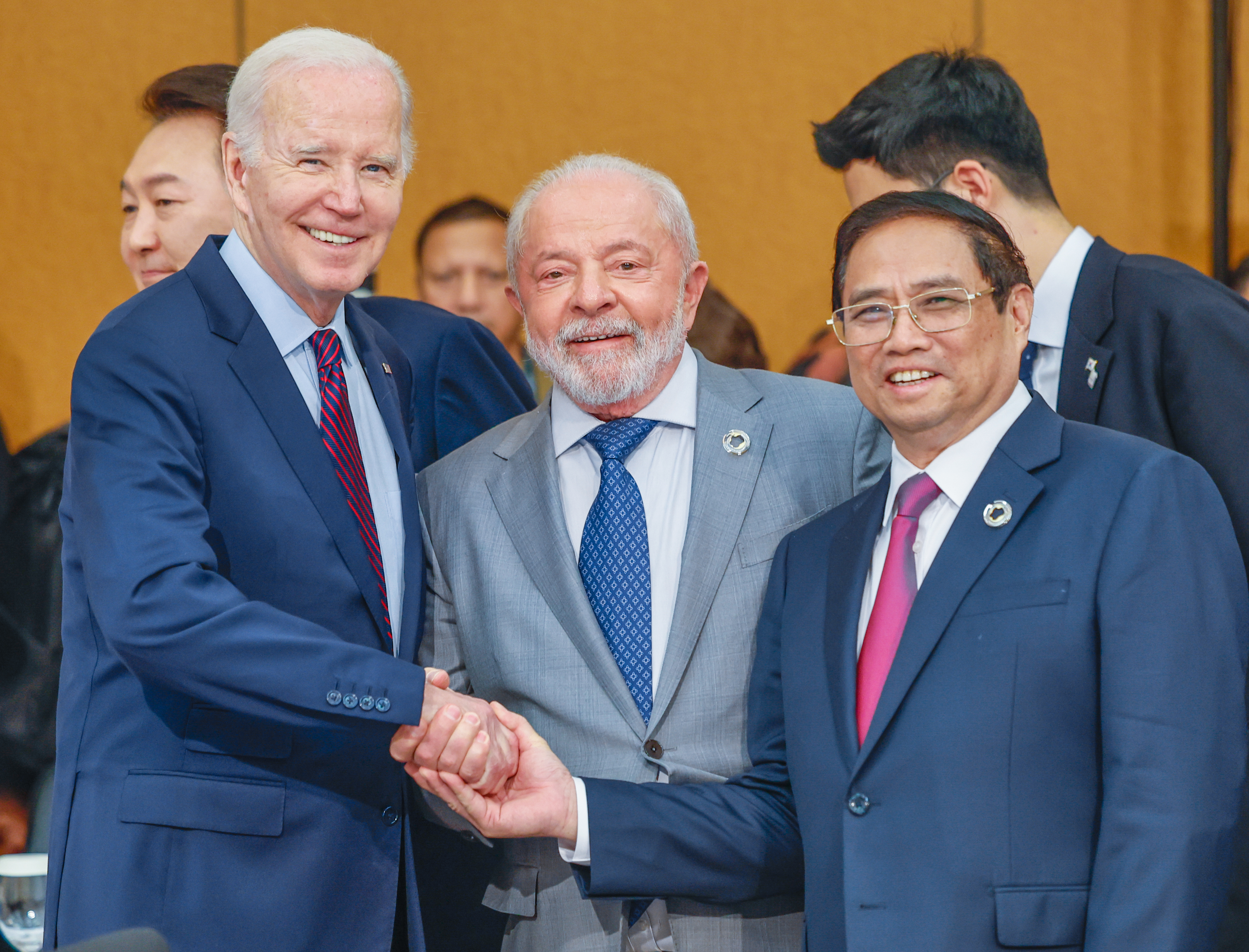
Phạm Minh Chính with US President Joe Biden and Brazilian President Luiz Inácio Lula da Silva at the 49th G7 summit

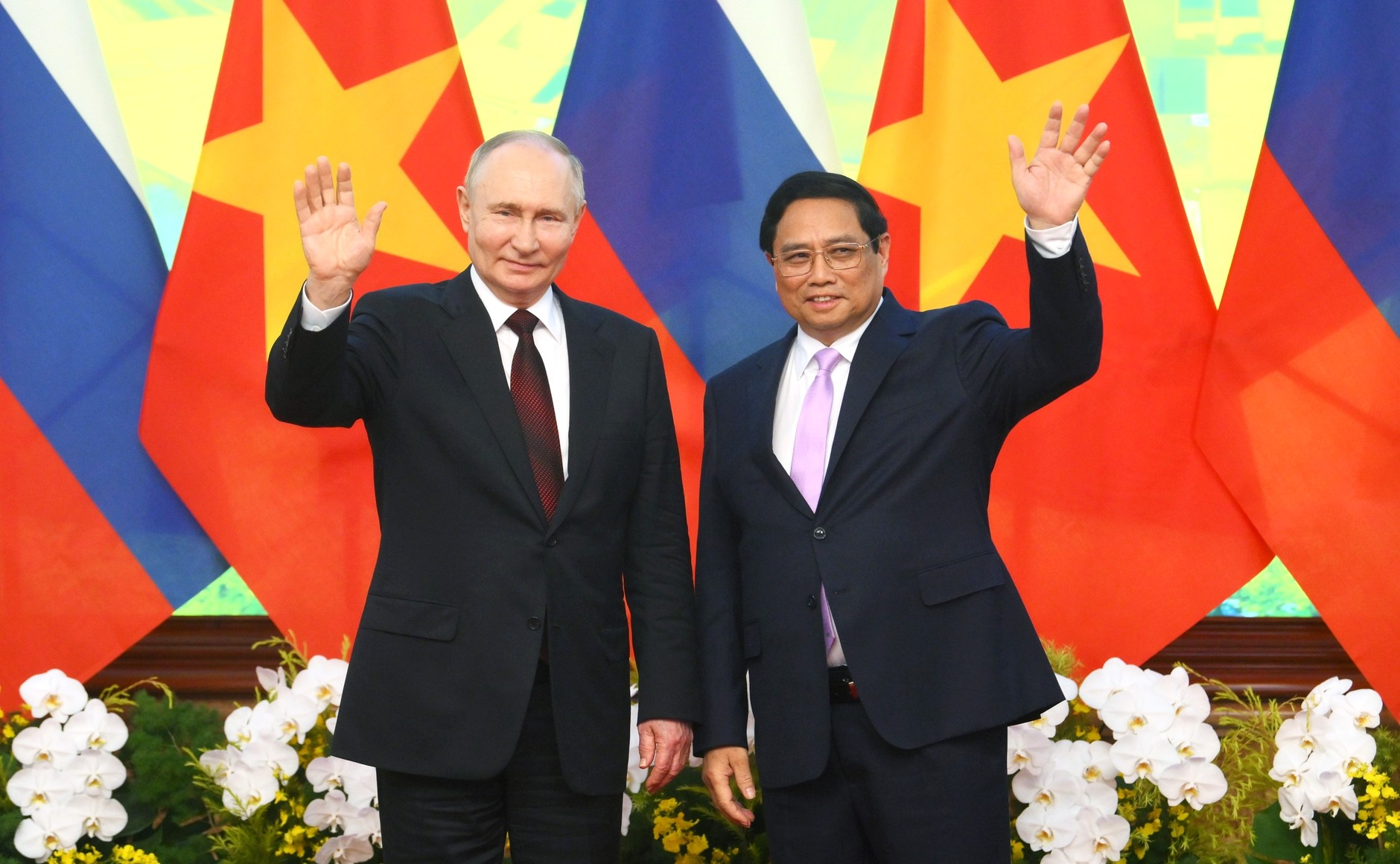
Phạm Minh Chính with Russian President Vladimir Putin in Hanoi, 20 June 2024

In 2023, by invitation from Li Qiang and the World Economic Forum, Phạm Minh Chính visited China and attended the World Economic Forum.

==== Special ASEAN-US Summit 2022 ====
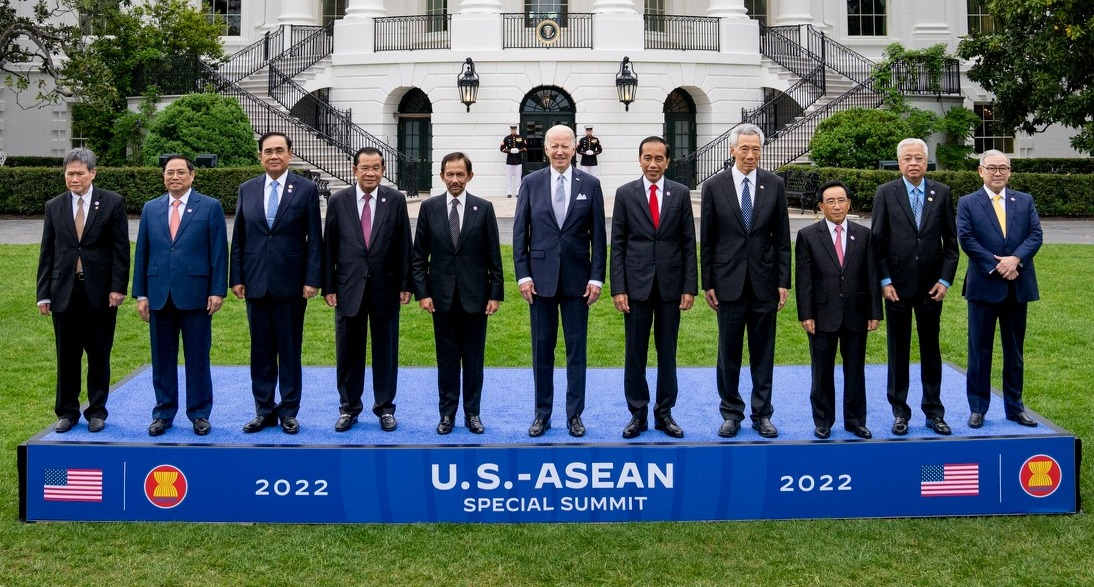
President Biden and ASEAN leaders at the White House

On May 13 (local time), Prime Minister Pham Minh Chinh and Leaders of the Association of Southeast Asian Nations attended official working sessions of the Special ASEAN Summit. – The United States includes a session between ASEAN Leaders and President Joe Biden, a discussion session between ASEAN Leaders and Vice President Harris on maritime security and COVID-19 prevention and a session discuss with Cabinet Ministers on climate change response, clean energy transition and sustainable infrastructure.

==== France ====
Vietnam and France are determined to introduce cooperation frameworks between the two countries, from politics - diplomacy, security - defense to economics - trade - investment, science and technology, health, education - training. Creativity, culture... continue to deepen, become more substantive and effective, while adapting to changes in the region and the world. Towards the 50th anniversary of establishing diplomatic relations and 10 years of establishing a strategic partnership in 2023, the two sides agreed to jointly develop an annual plan with specific tasks, aiming to bring Vietnam-France relations continues to develop to new heights.

==== Japan ====
This is Fumio Kishida's first visit to Vietnam after 6 months of taking office as Prime Minister of Japan and after 5 months since Prime Minister Phạm Minh Chính's state visit to Japan.

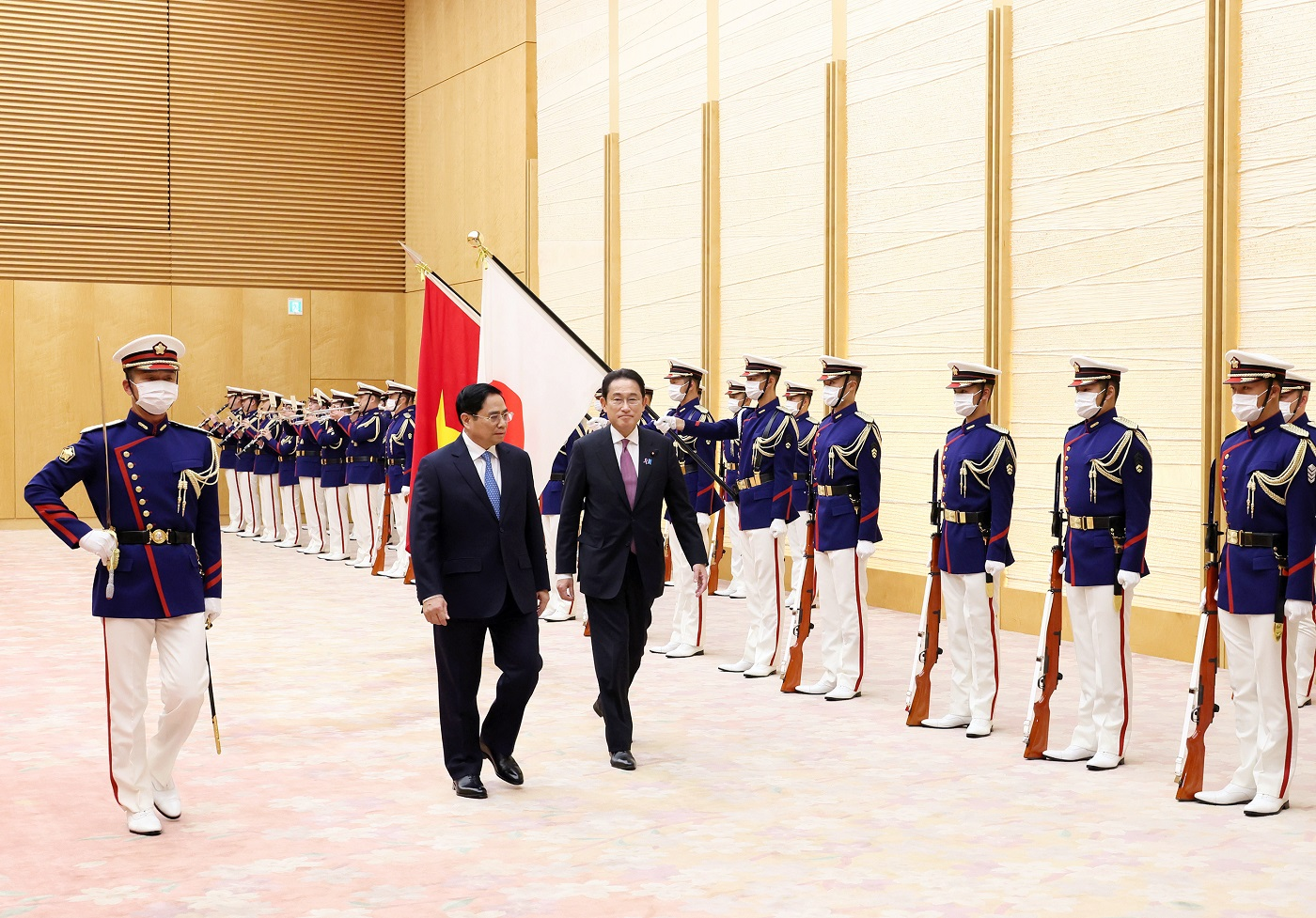
Chính in Japan, 2021

Relations between Vietnam and Japan during Chính’s term are said to be at their best stage to date. With both sides working towards the 50th anniversary of establishing relations in 2023. Kishida's state visit to Vietnam aims to deepen Vietnam-Japan relations and promote the implementation of the results of Japan's official visit to Japan. Chính enhanced political trust between Vietnam and Japan and good relations between the two countries' senior leaders on the basis of "affection, sincerity, and trust" and enhanced practical cooperation in various fields. fields, meeting the interests and aspirations of the two peoples. At the talks held on the morning of 1 May, both men expressed their joy at the outstanding development of Vietnam-Japan relations and reached a broad common understanding of the major direction and measures to continue working together. Deeper cooperation in all fields, opening a new stage of development for the extensive strategic partnership between the two countries. Create conditions for Vietnam to export fruits to Japan.

==== United States ====
On May 12, 2023, Prime Minister Phạm Minh Chính had a meeting with US President Joe Biden at the White House. At the meeting, the two leaders discussed Vietnam-US bilateral relations as well as regional and international issues. He also met with executives from leading American corporations as well as businesses led by Vietnamese-Americans.

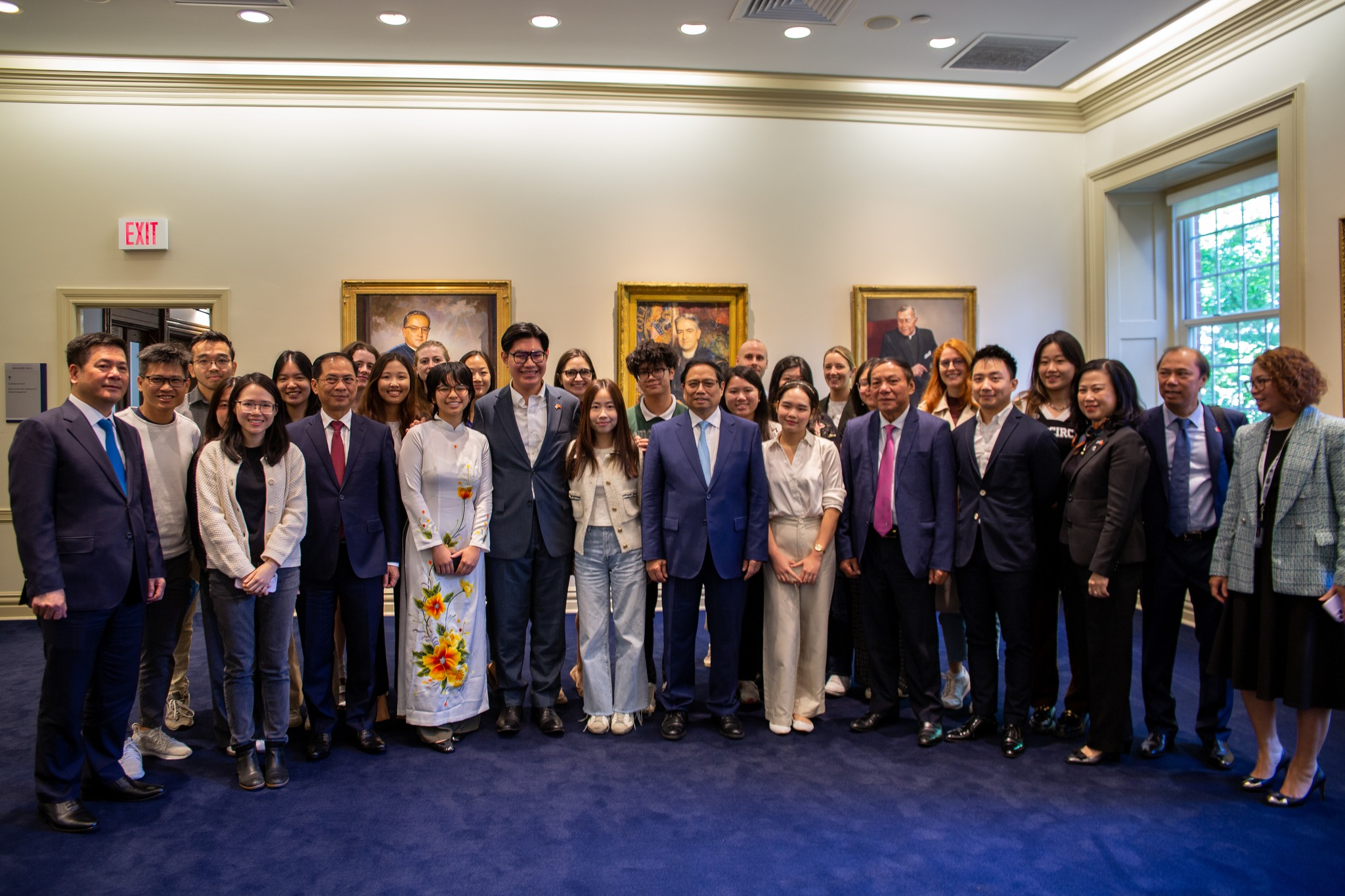
Prime Minister Phạm Minh Chính at Georgetown University

In September 2023, following the signing of the Vietnam-US Comprehensive Strategic Partnership, Prime Minister Chính began a visit to Brazil and the United States. In Washington, D.C., he gave a speech at Walsh School of Foreign Service of Georgetown University on Vietnam's foreign policy and US-Vietnam relations before meeting with U.S. government and congressional officials, including Commerce Secretary Gina Raimondo and House Speaker Kevin McCarthy.

== Family ==
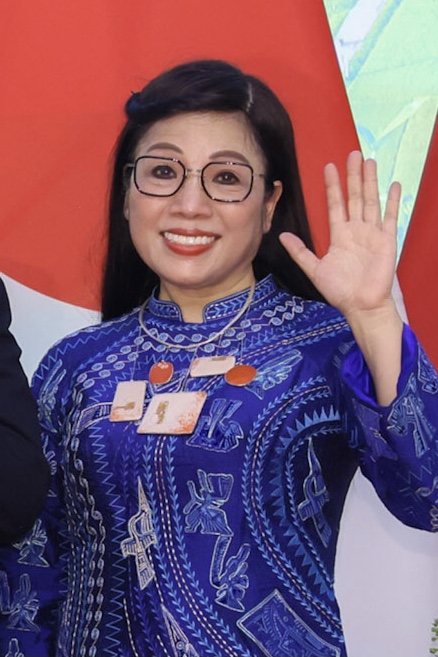
His wife, Le Thi Bich Tran in 2025

Pham Minh Chinh has a son and a daughter. His younger brother, Pham Tri Thuc, held the position of Vice Chairman of the National Assembly Law Committee and was an assembly member during the XIII and XIV sessions. His younger sister, Pham Thi Thanh, is the Director-General of Internal Affairs at the Government Office.

== History of military rank conferment ==
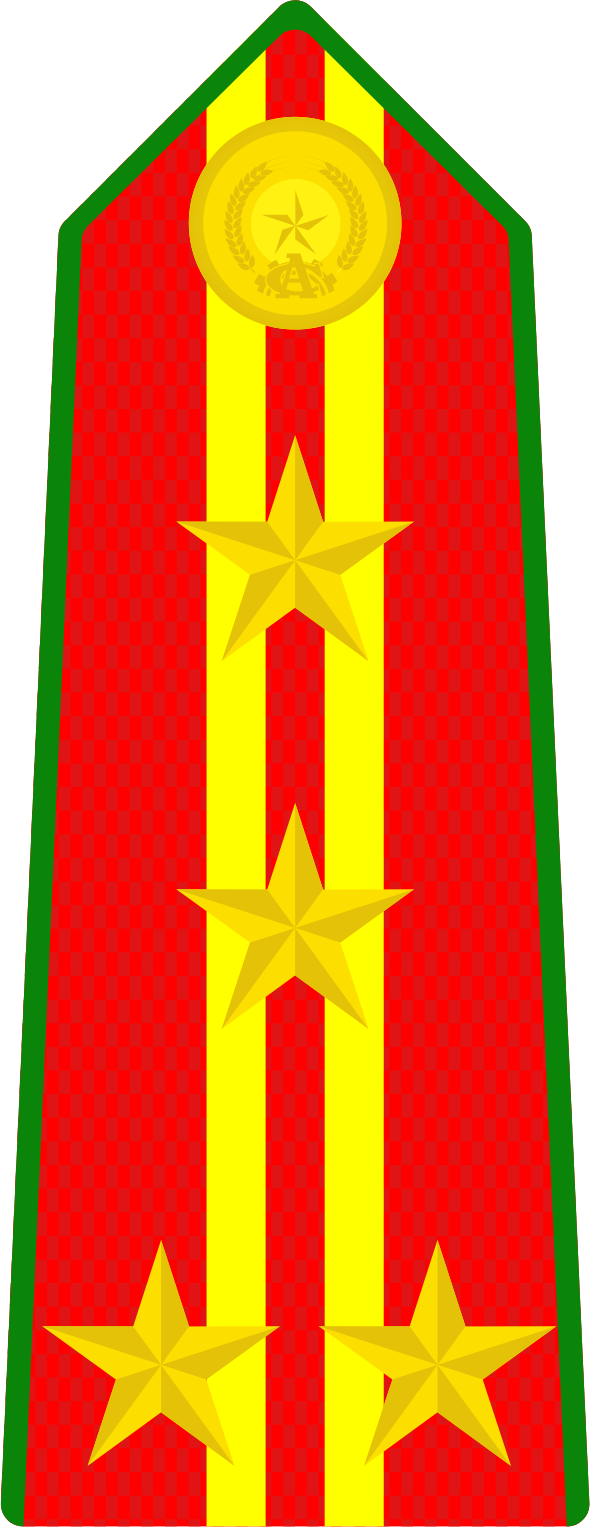
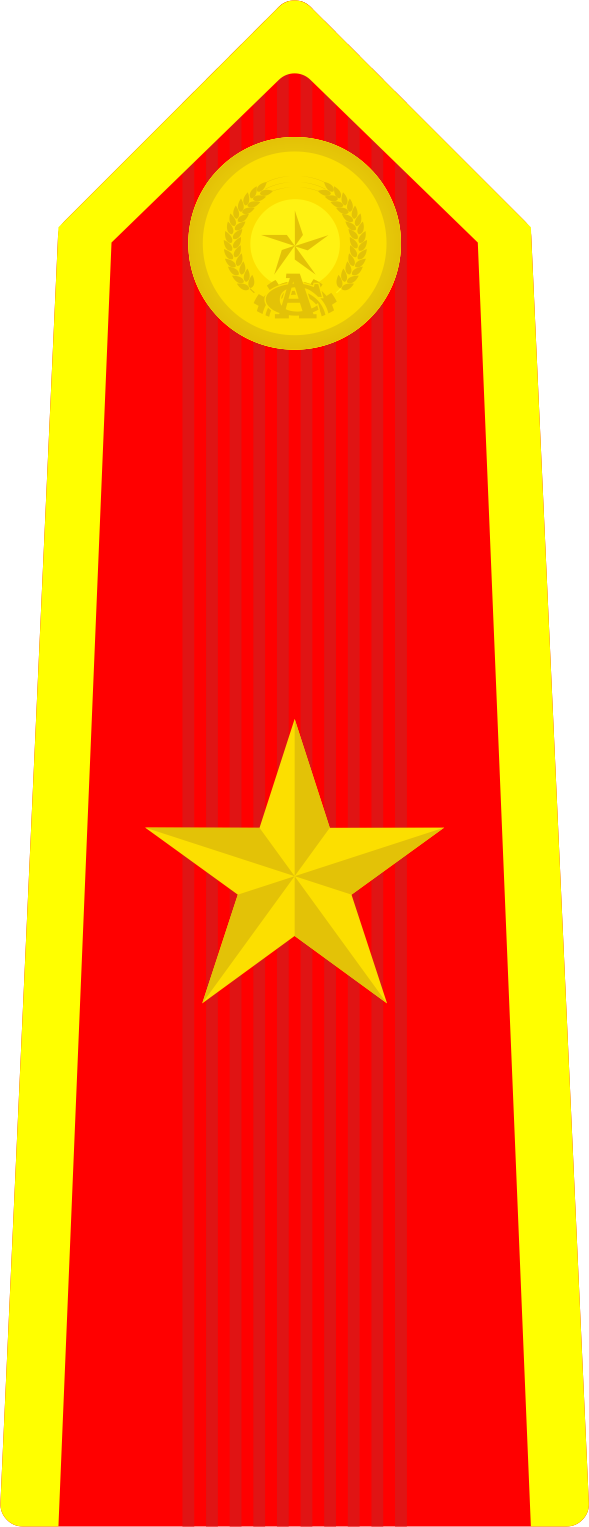
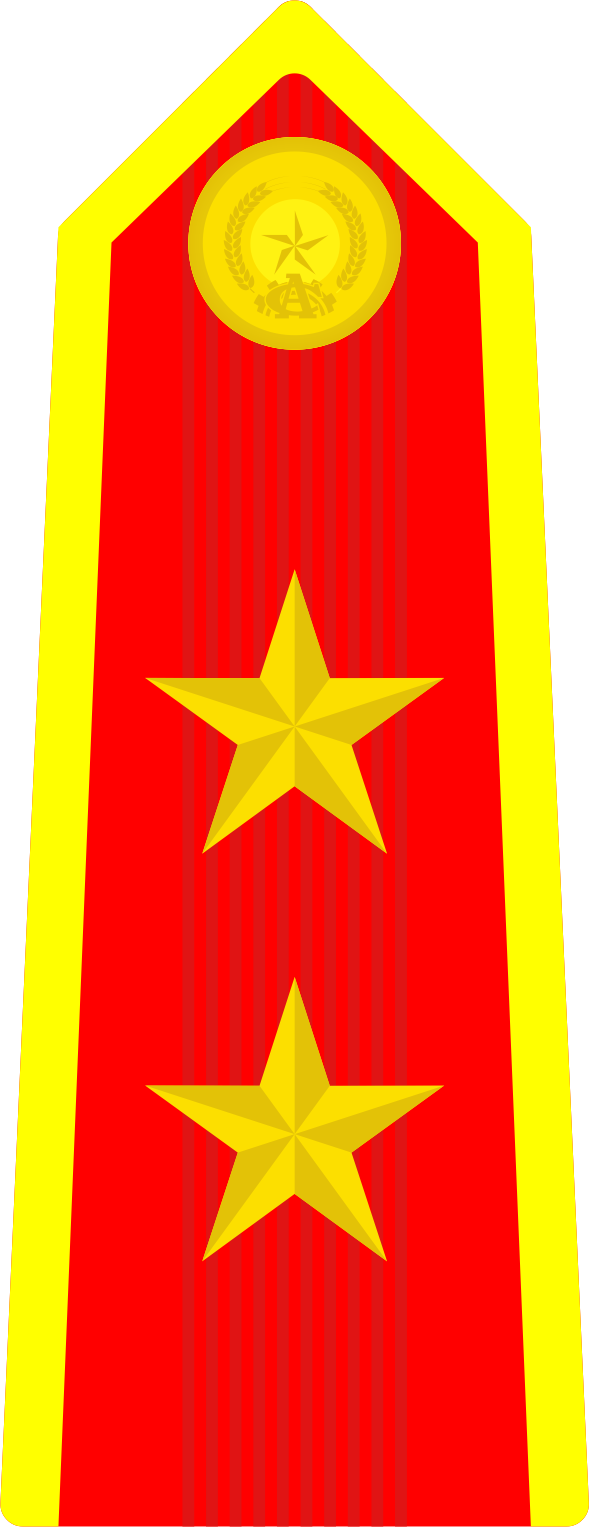
Year of ordination	–	2007	2010
Rank
Rank name	Senior colonel	Major general	Lieutenant general

== Honours ==
=== State honours ===
==== Vietnam ====
- Third-class Order of Independence: 2010
- Second-Class Labor Order
- First-Class Glorious Fighter Medal
- Prime Minister’s Certificate of Merit
- First-Class Military Exploit Order

==== Other ====
- Honorary Professor title by Tsinghua University (2025)
- Grand Cordon of the Order of the Rising Sun (2026)
