= Bế Văn Đàn =

Vietnamese soldier (1931–1954)

Hero of the People's Armed Forces Bế Văn Đàn
- Born: 1931; Triệu Ẩu, Phục Hòa, Cao Bằng, French Indochina
- Died: 12 December 1953 (aged 21–22); Điện Biên
- Military career
- Allegiance: Democratic Republic of Vietnam
- Branch: People's Army of Vietnam
- Units: Company 674; 251st Battalion; 174th Regiment; 316th Division
- Known for: Using one's body as a gun mount.
- Conflicts: First Indochina War
- Awards: Hero of the People's Armed Forces; Military Exploit Order - Class 2; Feat Order - First Class

Bế Văn Đàn (1931 – 12 December 1953) was a Vietnamese soldier of the People's Army of Vietnam in the First Indochina War. During the fight in Mường Pồn, Đàn used his shoulders to support the two legs of the light machine gun operated by his comrade, resulting in his death. He was posthumously awarded the title of Hero of the People's Armed Forces for this action.

== Early years ==
Bế Văn Đàn was born into a poor Tày family with revolutionary tradition in Bản Buôn hamlet, Triệu Ẩu commune (now renamed Bế Văn Đàn commune), Phục Hòa district, Cao Bằng province, in 1931. His father was a miner, and his mother died when he was young. His uncle, a revolutionary activist, was captured and killed by the French Army. At a young age, Đàn worked as a servant for a landlord. After five years of serving, he escaped to live with his aunt and later joined the guerilla force.

== People's Army of Vietnam ==
As the Việt Minh prepared for the Autumn-Winter Border Campaign, in January 1948 or 1949, Đàn volunteered to join the army. He was assigned to an infantry squad in Company 674, 251st Battalion, 174th Regiment, 316th Division, which is the main force of the Ministry of National Defence. Đàn became the battalion's liaison officer, responsible for delivering news from the regiment to lower-level units. From 1949 to 1953, he participated in various campaigns and battles.

In the Winter-Spring Campaign of 1953–1954, his unit was tasked by the 174th Regiment and 141st Regiment to hold the enemy in Mường Pồn, Điện Biên district. The fighting intensified as two companies from the French Army launched several counterattacks with artillery and air support. The unit was ordered to "at all costs" hold them in order to let the main force have opportunity to implement the campaign's plan. Đàn volunteered to become the deliverer of the unit's orders and later participated in the battle.

On 12 December 1953, the third counterattack from the French came and the heavy casualties left Đàn's unit with only 17 soldiers. At 8 o'clock, the fighting subsided for a moment before the French force ran down from the hill slope and advanced to the unit's territory. Being face-to-face with them, Chu Văn Pù used his FM 24/29 light machine gun to fire, but all of the shoot missed due to the disadvantage spot. Later, Đàn, despite having been wounded, knelt down and put two legs of the machine gun on his shoulder so Pù can use them. The battle lasted until 12 o'clock, after the French force's last counterattack ended in defeat. As Pù checked Đàn, he found out that Đàn had been seriously injured in his chest and died while still holding the gun's legs.

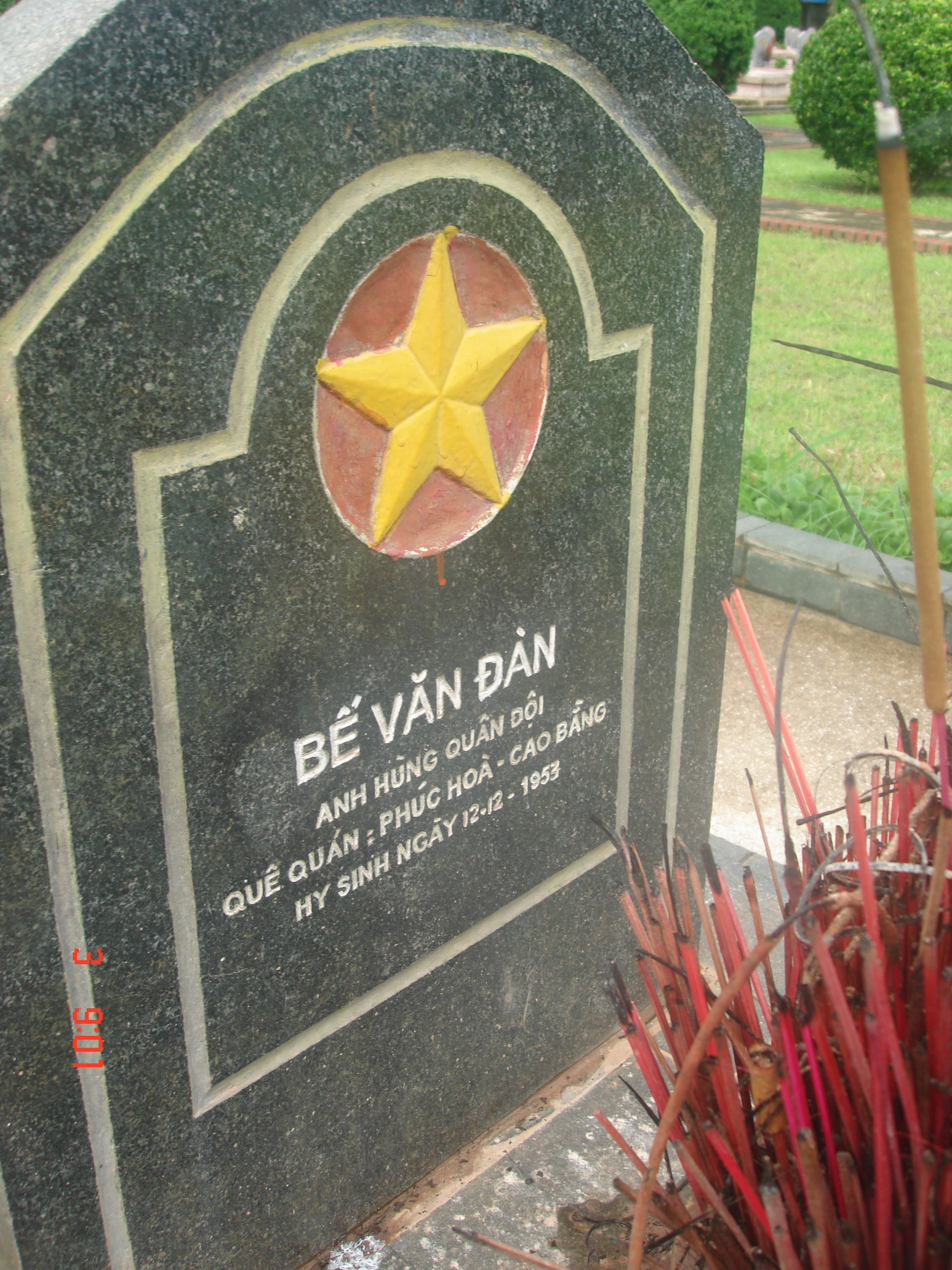
Bế Văn Đàn's tomb

Bế Văn Đàn was posthumously awarded the First Class Feat Order and the No. 1 Emulation Soldier of the Battalion on the unit's commendation ceremony. On 31 August 1955, he was awarded the title of Hero of the People's Armed Forces and the Second Class Military Exploit Order. In May 1959, his corpse was relocated from Mường Pồn to A1 Martyrs' Cemetery in Điện Biên.

== Legacy ==
Bế Văn Đàn's action was regarded as an example of courage in the People's Army of Vietnam. The light machine gun is displayed in the Vietnam National Museum of History. His fountain pen and the Military Exploit Order medal are displayed in the Vietnam Military History Museum. Several schools and streets were named after him, including in Hà Nội, Hồ Chí Minh City, Đồng Hới, Hạ Long, Pleiku, Bắc Ninh, Cần Thơ, Đà Nẵng and Cao Bằng City.

In 1964, poet Trinh Đường wrote a poem commemorating the matyr, which composer Huy Du set to music as the song "Bế Văn Đàn sống mãi" (English: Bế Văn Đàn Lives On). When Xuân Diệu visited Điện Biên Phủ, he also wrote the poem titled "Mộ Bế Văn Đàn" (English: The Tomb of Bế Văn Đàn).
