= Nguyễn Hữu Hạnh =

Vietnamese military officer (1926–2019)

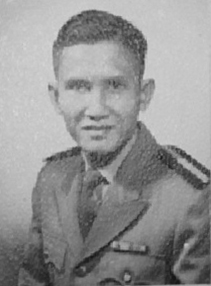
- Born: July 26, 1926; Phú Phong, Châu Thành, Mỹ Tho, French Indochina (now Vietnam)
- Died: September 29, 2019 (aged 93) Ho Chi Minh City, Vietnam
- Allegiance: Vietnamese National Army (1946–1954); Army of the Republic of Vietnam (1954–1975); Viet Cong (as an intelligence agent, 1963–1975)
- Service years: 1946–1975
- Rank: Brigadier general
- Conflicts: Fall of Saigon
- Awards: By the Socialist Republic of Vietnam: Great National Unity Order; Military Exploit Order, 1st rank

Nguyễn Hữu Hạnh (Vietnamese pronunciation: [ŋwiəŋ˨˩˦ hɨw˨˩˦ han˨˩˨]; July 26, 1926 – September 29, 2019) was a Vietnamese military officer of South Vietnam during the Vietnam War, rising to the rank of Brigadier General.

He was also a Viet Cong (VC) sympathizer and spy. Hạnh played an important role in the Fall of Saigon when he used his authority and influence to facilitate the bloodless surrender of the South Vietnam government. Hạnh's contribution to the VC was recognized by the unified Socialist Republic of Vietnam and he was considered as a patriotic figure in the unified Vietnam.

Hạnh is the main character of the historical novel The Brigadier General by Nguyễn Trần Thiết.

== Childhood ==
Hạnh was born on 26 July 1926 at Phú Phong, Châu Thành district, Mỹ Tho province (Cochinchina), to a wealthy farming family. His grandfather, Nguyễn Quang Phát, was a Confucian scholar. He refused to take part in the pro-French village governing body and committed suicide in 1947 at the age of 72, after being unjustly humiliated by a Moroccan French soldier. One of his paternal uncles, Nguyễn Tấn Thành, was a Communist, and took a vital role in converting Hạnh into a communist sympathizer. Hạnh did well in maths and was also a good learner of French. He finished his highschool study in the Collège de My Tho (now is the Nguyễn Đình Chiểu High School in Mỹ Tho City). After the 1945 August Revolution, he worked as a secretary for the regional Viet Minh branch in his homeland Mỹ Tho. However, Mỹ Tho was quickly overrun by the French army. Many people evacuated to other regions, including Hạnh to Saigon.

== Service in the French Union Army and the South Vietnamese Army ==
An unemployed Hạnh was proposed by a friend to join the French Union Army and he did so in 1946. He attended the Vũng Tàu Military School, became a subordinate and a close friend of Dương Văn Minh. He was promoted to the rank lieutenant and became a battalion commander. He was later promoted to major, 11th regiment commander, and at the end of 1954 he took over the Long Xuyên subzone after the French Army left. He became Minh's staff chief in early 1955 and took over the area of Rừng Sác, Chợ Lớn province, Gia Định, Tây Ninh and Saigon city. Under the command of Minh, he participated in several military campaigns in 1955–56 against the rebel forces of Hoà Hảo and Cao Đài. He took a 42 weeks training course at Fort Leavenworth - Kansas in 1958, and an intelligence and strategy course at Fort Hollabird - Maryland in 1962. He was promoted to colonel in 1963 and appointed as staff chief of IV Corps under the command of Huỳnh Văn Cao.

Being a close friend of Minh, he took part in the November 1963 coup against Ngô Đình Diệm where Minh was a main participant. Hạnh assisted Nguyễn Hữu Có in capturing the headquarters of the 2nd Division and prevented IV Corps from rescuing Diệm.

In 1968 upon the recommendation of the U.S. 5th Special Forces Group commander, the Joint General Staff established the 44th Special Tactical Zone along the Cambodian frontier in the II Corps area to control all border surveillance and interdiction efforts there. The U.S. Special Forces advisers had sought a Vietnamese Special Forces commander for the new zone, but instead command was given to Hạnh.

Hạnh's military career suffered under the presidency of Nguyễn Văn Thiệu, who considered Minh and his associates as rivals. He was promoted to Brigadier general in 1969 and was appointed as vice-commander of IV Corps and II Corps.

In 1972 he lost his position as corps vice-commander and was transferred to Đà Nẵng as the General Inspector of I Corps. He was forced to retire in May 1974 at the age of 48 under a rule restricting military service to 20 years, a move used by Thiệu to purge his political opponents.

== Viet Cong sympathizer and intelligence agent ==
Hạnh had a good relationship with his paternal uncle Nguyễn Văn Thành (also named as Tám) despite knowing Tám as a communist. When Tám was arrested during the purge against communism in 1956, Hạnh intervened to save Tám's life and released him shortly after. Via Tám, Hạnh was exposed to leftist ideas and sympathized with the Communist Party of Vietnam and North Vietnam's President Hồ Chí Minh who Hạnh considered as patriotic and respectable. On the other hand, Hạnh became dissatisfied with United States intervention in South Vietnamese politics, which he considered as a gross violation of Vietnam's sovereignty. Hạnh was also upset with the brutality of the U.S. military campaigns in Vietnam.

A turning point of Hạnh's life occurred at the death of his father in October 1963. To fulfill his father's dying wish of being buried in his homeland - at the time under the control of the VC - Hạnh negiotated a ceasefire with the VC and was allowed to organize his father's funeral there. The VC also allowed Hạnh to visit and pay respect to his father's grave three days later. Hạnh's filial love attracted the attention of the VC and he was considered a potential VC sympathizer since then. Tám was assigned with the task to persuade Hạnh.

Hạnh finally agreed to work as an intelligence agent for the VC under the pseudonym "Morning Star" and codename S7. Tám acted as the sole communicator between Hạnh and the VC. To protect Hạnh's cover, the VC did not assign him any specific task. Nonetheless, Hạnh made use of his own authority to assist the VC occasionally. Using the excuse of "caution", he restrained his troops from having aggressive actions against the VC, forbade excessive use of firepower and only allowed helicopters to open fire to retaliate against enemy fire. He refused to execute the bombardment of Tháp Mười to avoid civilian casualties. During engagements with the VC, Hạnh's troop only took part perfunctorily and retreated immediately at the end of the battle. He then gained the nickname of "cautious commander" and "the commander who captures no target". Some of Hạnh's colleagues suspected him as a Communist sympathizer, but no evidence was found.

Hạnh rescued VC sympathizers arrested by the Saigon authorities. He assisted in the release of Huỳnh Xuân, a VC agent arrested in 1968 on accusations of weapon smuggling. He took part in the anti-corruption campaigns and assisted the political opponents of Thiệu. Via Tám, Hạnh provide vital information related to the military activities of South Vietnam.

Hạnh received his first official mission in 1970, when he was tasked to participate in "the Third forces", a collection of politicians and social dignitaries who supported the unification of Vietnam and reconciliation with the VC and North Vietnam. Specifically, Hạnh's target was his old friend Minh who also sympathized with the reconciliation ideas. However Hạnh's mission was temporarily disrupted by his relocation in 1972 and his forced retirement in 1974.

== Role in the 1975 Ho Chi Minh Offensive ==
In early 1975 he confirmed that the ARVN was unable to recover its losses to the People's Army of Vietnam (PAVN) at the Battle of Phước Long. He advised that the ARVN could be caught off-guard at the Battle of Buôn Ma Thuột and had no local reserves there. During the offensives of 1975, Hạnh encouraged the PAVN to make rapid advances and leave the liberated areas to the local defense forces without the risk of being attacked at the rear. During the Fall of Saigon, Hạnh advised the PAVN to block all the roads to Saigon at the divisional level to facilitate the surrender Saigon government.

After the collapse of ARVN defenses at Xuân Lộc and Phan Rang, the PAVN approached Saigon and prepare for its final offensive in late April 1975. On the other side, Minh was appointed as president on 28 April. Hạnh's mission related to Minh resumed. He was tasked to use his influence on Minh to encourage a bloodless surrender of the Saigon government. Hạnh hastily arrived Saigon on 28 April and meet Minh the next morning. Minh appointed Hạnh as the assistant of Chief of Staff Nguyễn Phúc Vĩnh Lộc.

Hạnh made use of his authority to report the irredeemable situation of the ARVN to Minh, urged Minh to stop all the resistance. Hạnh also frustrated all the individual attempts to prolong the fight of the bitter military officers, and prevented the destruction of Đồng Nai bridge and other bridges lead to Saigon. He then ordered the Military Police to confiscate the weapons of unsupervised soldiers and maintain strict security in Saigon. On 30 April at 9:30 AM, Minh and Nguyễn Hữu Hạnh broadcast their announcements to cease all resistance and ordered all ARVN soldiers and officers to follow suit. Hạnh also contacted general Nguyễn Khoa Nam, commander of IV Corps in the Mekong Delta, to obey the orders of Minh. Then Hạnh together with Minh and Minh's cabinet arranged the surrender of Saigon government to the PAVN.

== After 1975 ==
The unified Socialist Republic of Vietnam recognized Hạnh's contribution to the VC. Therefore, unlike other South Vietnamese politicians and military officers, Hạnh was neither arrested nor sent to the reeducation camps. He was recognized as a patriotic figure, was elected as the Secretary of People's Association for School Guardian and became a Committee Member of the Vietnamese Fatherland Front. He was awarded the Military Exploit Order, 1st rank, Bronze Wall Order, 3rd rank, and the Great National Unity Order. He also received visits from the government authorities and interviews about his contributions to the VC during the war.

Hạnh died in Saigon on 29 September 2019, aged 95.
