= Võ Thị Thắng =

Vietnamese revolutionary and stateswoman (1945–2014)

- The "Smile of Victory" photograph, for which Võ Thị Thắng is most well known outside of Vietnam.

Member of the Central Committee of the Communist Party of Vietnam
- In office 1996–2006

Member of the National Assembly of Vietnam for Long An province
- In office 1975–1981

Personal details
- Born: 10 December 1945 Tân Bửu commune, Tây Ninh province, Vietnam (present-day divisions)
- Died: 22 August 2014 (aged 68) Ho Chi Minh City, Vietnam
- Party: Communist Party of Vietnam
- Awards: Hero of the People's Armed Forces; Order of Independence; Order of Labour; Order of Resistance; Order of Victory

Military service
- Allegiance: National Liberation Front of South Vietnam (Viet Cong)
- Years of service: 1962–1975
- Battles/wars: Vietnam War

Võ Thị Thắng (Vietnamese: [vɔ˨˩˦ tʰɪj˨˩˨ tʰaŋ˧˥]; 10 December 1945 – 22 August 2014) was a Vietnamese revolutionary and stateswoman. She was a member of the Long An delegation to the National Assembly of Vietnam during its fourth, fifth, and sixth sessions (1975 to 1981). She later served as a member of the Central Committee of the Communist Party of Vietnam during its eighth and ninth congresses (1996 to 2006), the Director General of the Vietnam National Administration of Tourism, the Chairwoman of the Vietnam–Cuba Friendship Association, and the Vice President of the Vietnam Women's Union.

Outside of Vietnam, she is most well known for a photograph of her smiling at her sentencing for an attempted assassination during the Vietnam War. The photograph is popularly known as the "Smile of Victory" and has become a symbol of Vietnamese women who fought in the war.

== Early life ==
Võ Thị Thắng was born on 10 December 1945 in what is now Tân Bửu commune, Tây Ninh province, Vietnam. She was the youngest of eight siblings, and her family members were supporters of the North Vietnamese government.

At the age of 16, Thắng joined the underground National Liberation Front of South Vietnam (NLF). When she was 17, she moved to Saigon (present-day Ho Chi Minh City) and joined the local branches of the Ho Chi Minh Communist Youth Union and Vietnamese Students' Association, which were banned under the South Vietnamese government.

== Vietnam War ==
In July 1968, during the Tet Offensive of the Vietnam War, the NLF tasked Thắng with assassinating a suspected spy in Saigon. After failing to kill her target, she was arrested by the South Vietnamese authorities and sentenced by a military court to 20 years of hard labour in Côn Đảo Prison. Upon receiving her sentence, Thắng faced the jury and retorted, "Will your government last long enough to imprison me for 20 years?" (Note: According to the BBC, the original retort in Vietnamese was "Liệu chính quyền của các ông có tồn tại đến 20 năm để bỏ tù tôi không?" Progressive International, however, provides a translation of a different retort: "Your government will not last that long.") A photograph of Thắng smiling, taken by a Japanese reporter at her sentencing, became popularly known as the "Smile of Victory", a symbol of Vietnamese women who fought in the Vietnam War.

Thắng was released on 7 March 1974 under the Paris Peace Accords, having served less than six years of her sentence.

== Later life ==
After the end of the Vietnam War and the reunification of Vietnam on 30 April 1975, Thắng retired from the People's Army of Vietnam and continued her work with the Ho Chi Minh Communist Youth Union. The Vietnamese government later appointed her standing vice president of the Vietnam Women's Union.

She was elected to the fourth (1971–1975), fifth (1975–1976), and sixth (1976–1981) sessions of the National Assembly of Vietnam as a representative of Long An Province, as well as to the eighth and ninth congresses of the Central Committee of the Communist Party of Vietnam. She also served as the Director General of the Vietnam National Administration of Tourism and the Chairwoman of the Vietnam–Cuba Friendship Association.

Thắng retired in 2007 and died on 22 August 2014.

== Honours ==
Thắng was posthumously conferred the title Hero of the People's Armed Forces by Vietnamese president Trương Tấn Sang on 20 August 2015. The Ministry of Culture, Sports and Tourism held the award ceremony on 10 September 2015, at the Caravelle Hotel in Ho Chi Minh City.

A primary school in Havana, Cuba, is named after her.

=== Awards ===
Country	Award
Vietnam	Hero of the People's Armed Forces
Vietnam	Order of Independence, 2nd class
Vietnam	Order of Labour, 1st class
Vietnam	Order of Resistance, 1st class
Vietnam	Order of Victory, 1st class
Cuba	Order of Anna Betancourt
Cuba	Order of Friendship

== See also ==
- Nguyễn Văn Trỗi, who was captured and executed after a failed attempt to assassinate two prominent U.S. officials in 1964
- Võ Thị Sáu, who was captured and executed after a failed grenade attack against colonial collaborators in 1952
