= Orders, decorations, and medals of Vietnam =

Emblem of Vietnam

The orders, decorations, and medals of Vietnam are specified by that country's National Assembly through the Law on Emulation and Commendation (No: 15/2003/QH11). Per this law, emulation aims to create a motive force to mobilize, attract and encourage all individuals and collectives to promote their patriotic tradition, dynamism and creativity in striving to well accomplish the assigned tasks for the objective of a prosperous people, a strong country, an equitable, democratic and civilized society. Commendation forms include: Order; State honorable title.

State Honorable Titles

State honorable titles shall be awarded or posthumously awarded to individuals and awarded to collectives that have made exceptionally outstanding contributions to the cause of national construction and defense:

Orders

Orders shall be conferred or posthumously conferred on individuals and conferred on collectives that have rendered meritorious services, recorded regular or unexpected achievements, contributing to the cause of national construction and defense.

Medals

Medals shall be awarded to officers, professional armymen, defense workers working in agencies and units of the People's Army; officers, professional non-commissioned officers working in agencies and units of the People's Police, and foreigners who have, for a period of time, devoted and/or made contributions to the cause of national construction and defense.

Image	Title	Ribbon	Inception Date	Award Criteria
State Honours
	Vietnamese Heroine Mother; Bà mẹ Việt Nam anh hùng		August 29, 1994	Mothers have made numerous contributions and sacrifices for the cause of national liberation, national construction and defense, and the performance of international obligations.
	Hero of the People's Armed Forces; Anh hùng Lực lượng vũ trang nhân dân		1955	Individuals have recorded exceptionally outstanding achievements in combat, combat service, preservation of security, social order and safety, are loyal to the socialist Fatherland of Vietnam and possess revolutionary virtues and qualities.
	Hero of Labour; Anh hùng Lao động		1970	Individuals have recorded exceptionally outstanding achievements in labor and creation for the objective of a prosperous people, a strong country and an equitable, democratic and civilized society, are loyal to the Socialist Republic of Vietnam, and possess revolutionary virtues and qualities.
Orders
	Gold Star Order; Huân chương Sao Vàng		June 6, 1947	The noblest order of the Socialist Republic of Vietnam; conferred or posthumously conferred on individuals who satisfy one of the following criteria: Having rendered great and exceptionally outstanding meritorious services in the revolutionary cause of the Party and the nation; Having rendered great and exceptionally outstanding meritorious services to the country in one of the political, economic, social, literature, art, scientific, technological, defense, security, diplomatic or other domains.
	Order of Ho Chi Minh; Huân chương Hồ Chí Minh		June 6, 1947	Individuals have rendered great meritorious services, recorded numerous outstanding achievements in one of the political, economic, social, literature, art, scientific, technological, defense, security, diplomatic or other domains.
	Independence Order; Huân chương Độc lập		June 6, 1947	Individuals have recorded exceptionally outstanding achievements in one of the political, economic, social, literature, art, scientific, technological, defense, security, diplomatic or other domains.
	Military Exploit Order; Huân chương Quân công		May 15, 1947	Individuals have recorded outstanding and brave exploits in combat, combat service, training, force building, consolidation of the all-people defense and people's security, or have sacrificed their lives heroically, setting bright examples in the whole country.
	Labour Order; Huân chương Lao động		May 1, 1950	Individuals or collectives have recorded outstanding achievements in labor, creativity or national construction.
	Fatherland Defense Order; Huân chương Bảo vệ Tổ quốc		November 26, 2003	Individuals or collectives have recorded achievements in training and building forces, consolidating the all-people defense and people's security.
	Feat Order; Huân chương Chiến công		May 15, 1947	Individuals or collectives have recorded exceptionally outstanding feats in combat or combat service.
	Great National Unity Order; Huân chương Đại đoàn kết dân tộc		November 26, 2003	Individuals have a long process of devotion, have rendered great meritorious services and recorded exceptionally outstanding achievements in the cause of building the great national unity block.
	Bravery Order; Huân chương Dũng cảm		November 26, 2003	Individuals have taken brave acts to save people or property of the State and/or the people.
	Friendship Order; Huân chương Hữu nghị		November 26, 2003	Foreigners and collectives of foreigners have made great contributions to building, consolidating and developing the friendship between Vietnam and other countries in the world.
Medals
	Determined-to-Win Military Flag Medal; Huy chương Quân kỳ Quyết thắng		October 27, 1984	Officers, professional armymen or defense workers who have served in the People's Army for 25 or more consecutive years.
	For National Security Medal; Huy chương Vì an ninh Tổ quốc		November 26, 2003	Officers, professional non-commissioned officers who have served in the People's Police for 25 or more consecutive years.
	Glorious Fighter Medal; Huy chương Chiến sĩ vẻ vang		September 12, 1961	Officers, professional armymen or defense workers working in agencies or units of the People's Army, and officers and professional non-commissioned officers working in agencies or units of the People's Police.
	Friendship Medal; Huy chương Hữu nghị		November 26, 2003	Foreigners who have worked in Vietnam for a certain period, made many contributions to the cause of construction and defense of Vietnam.

== See also ==
- Vietnam People's Navy
- Vietnam People's Air Force
- Vietnam Border Defense Force
- Vietnam Marine Police
- List of military decorations
- Socialist orders of merit
