= Bravery Order =

Bravery Order Huân chương Dũng cảm
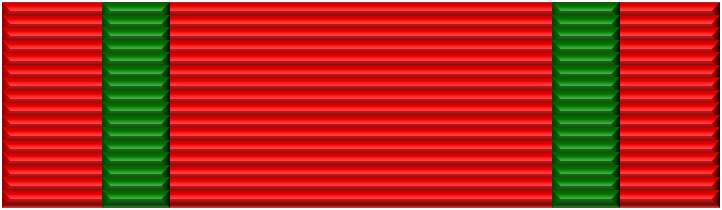
- Type: Single-grade order
- Awarded for: Individuals have taken brave acts to save people or property of the State.
- Presented by: the Government of Vietnam
- Eligibility: Vietnamese civilians, military personnel
- Status: Currently awarded
- Established: 26 November 2003

Precedence
- Next (higher): Great National Unity Order
- Next (lower): Friendship Order

The Bravery Order (Vietnamese: Huân chương Dũng cảm) is a service award conferred by the Government of Vietnam. It is given to honor or individuals who display acts of bravery by either rescuing people, or by protecting state and public property; it can be given posthumously. The Bravery Order has no classification levels. The authority to award the Bravery Order rests with the President.

== Description ==
The Bravery Order consists of three parts:

- Medal Clasp
- Medal Ribbon
- Medal Body

== Award Criteria ==
The Bravery Order is awarded or posthumously awarded to officials, soldiers, militia members, and all citizens regardless of age, who demonstrate bravery in saving lives or protecting state and public property, meeting one of the following criteria:

- Acts of Extreme Bravery: Individuals who, without fear of sacrificing their own lives, are determined to save people or protect state and public property in cases of fires, natural disasters, or criminal threats. This also applies to those who courageously enter dangerous areas affected by epidemics to protect the lives of others. The achievements must serve as an example and inspiration at the provincial, municipal, or regional level and beyond.
- Heroic Sacrifice: Individuals who have heroically sacrificed their lives while rescuing others or protecting state property, earning public admiration and becoming role models.

== See also ==
- Vietnam awards and decorations
