= Fatherland Defense Order =

Fatherland Defense Order Huân chương Bảo vệ Tổ quốc
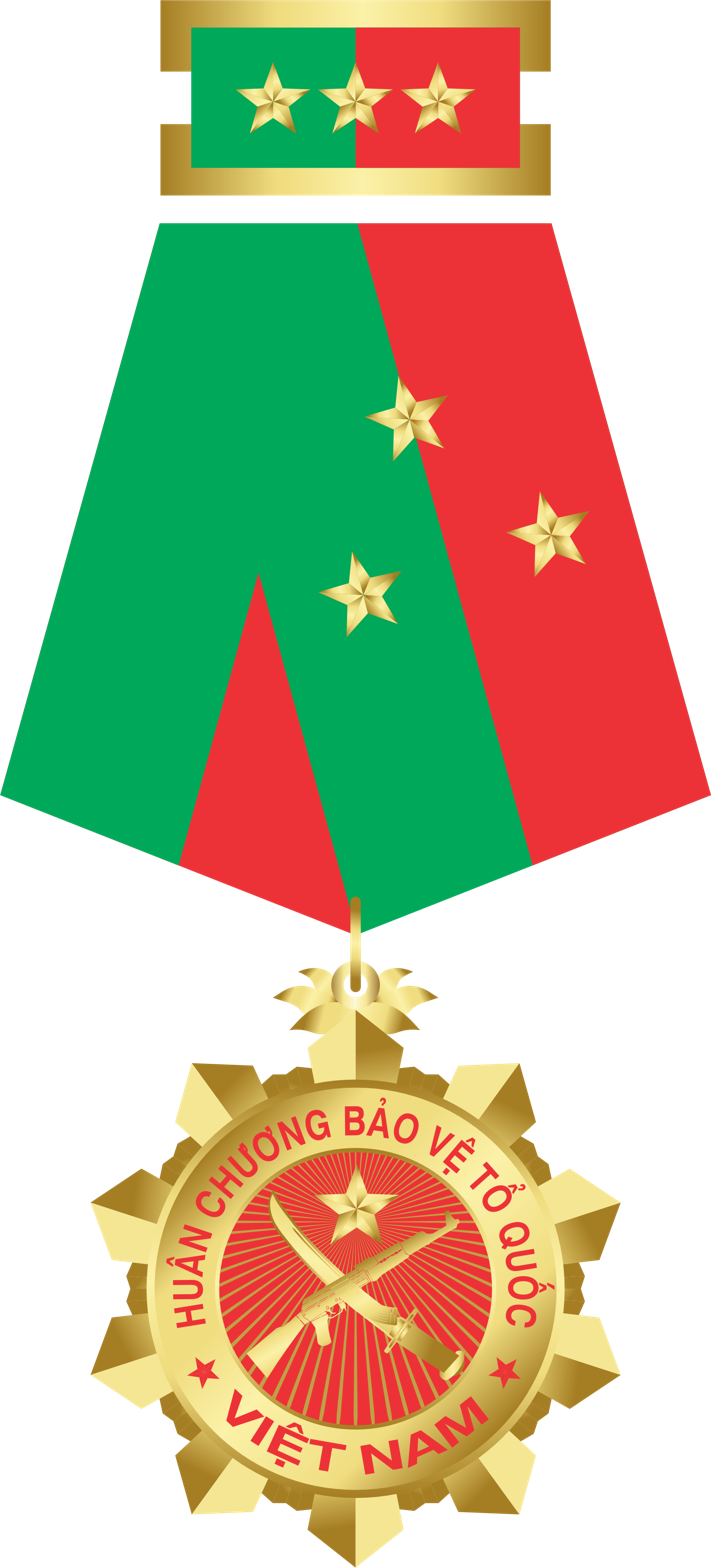
- Type: Single-grade order
- Awarded for: Individuals and collectives that have recorded achievements in training and building forces, consolidating the all-people defense and people's security.
- Presented by: the Government of Vietnam
- Eligibility: Vietnamese civilians, military personnel, and organization.
- Status: Currently awarded
- Established: 26 November 2003

Precedence
- Next (higher): Labor Order
- Next (lower): Feat Order

The Fatherland Defense Order (Vietnamese: Huân chương bảo vệ tổ quốc) is an award conferred by the Government of Vietnam. It is awarded to individuals and organizations for achievements in training and building forces and in strengthening national defense and security.

== Individual awards ==
It is conferred or posthumously conferred on individuals who satisfy one of the following criteria:

- Having inventions, scientific works or outstanding works of the State level;
- Having recorded unexpected exceptionally outstanding achievements or consistent devotion in the armed forces.

== Collective awards ==
It is conferred on collectives which satisfy one of the following criteria:

- Having been conferred the second-class Fatherland Defense Order, the Excellent Labor Collective or Determined-To-Win Unit title for the subsequent five consecutive years, and the Emulation Flag of the ministerial-, branch-. provincial- or central mass organization-level for three times or the Government's Emulation Flag twice;
- Having recorded unexpected exceptionally outstanding achievements.

== See also ==
- Vietnam awards and decorations
