= Hero of the People's Armed Forces =

Vietnamese civilian and military award

Hero of the People's Armed Forces Anh hùng Lực lượng vũ trang nhân dân
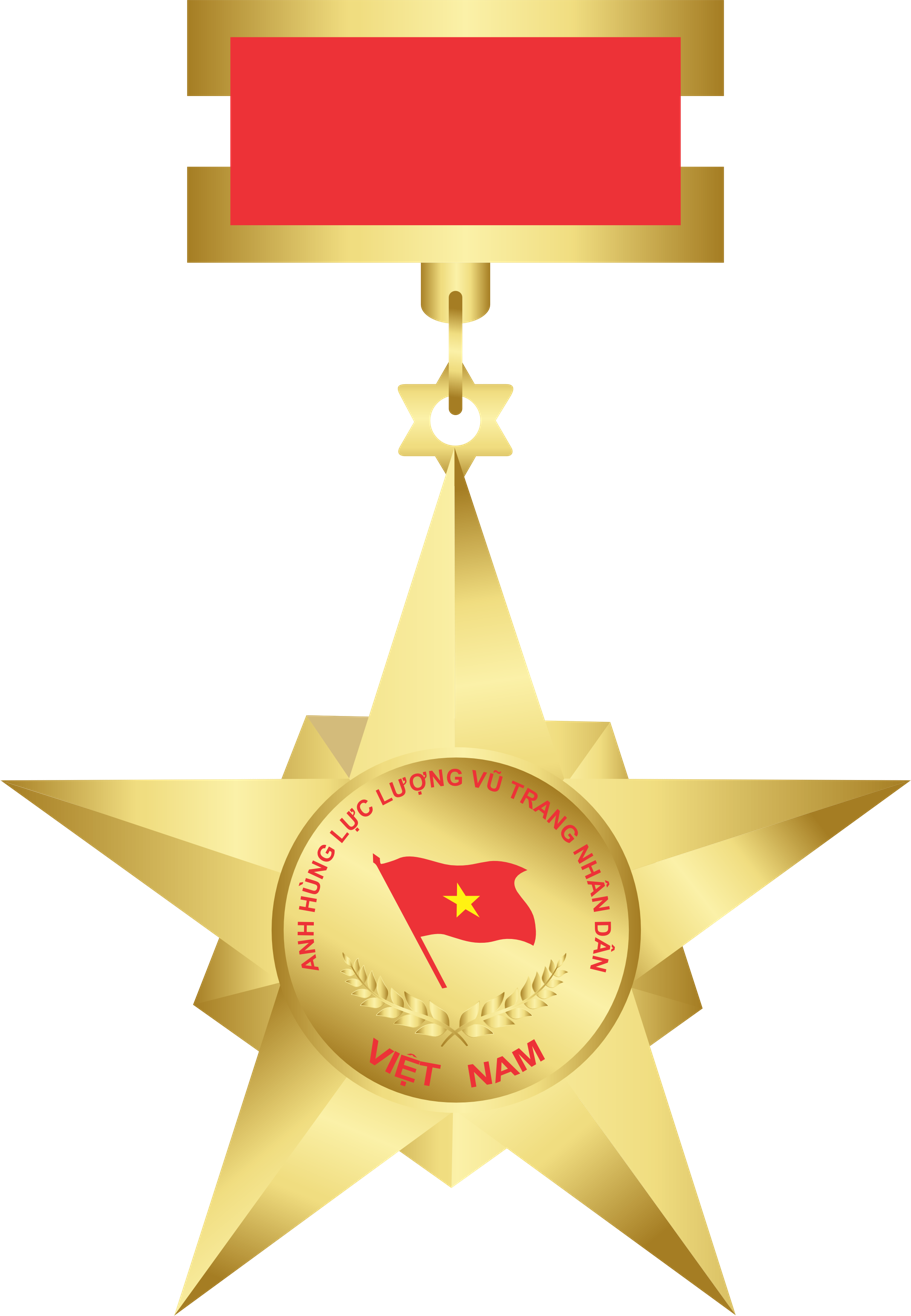
- Type: Single-grade order
- Awarded for: exceptionally outstanding achievements in combat, combat service and work, represent the revolutionary heroism in the cause of national liberation, national defense, protect the people
- Presented by: the Government of Vietnam
- Eligibility: Vietnamese civilians, military personnel, and organization. Foreigners.
- Status: Currently awarded
- Established: 1955

Precedence
- Next (higher): Hero of Labour

The Hero of the People's Armed Forces (Vietnamese: Anh hùng lực lượng vũ trang nhân dân) is an honorary designation of Socialist Republic of Vietnam.

== Criteria ==
The title (and medal) of Hero of the People's Armed Force is awarded to individuals with "exceptionally outstanding achievements in combat, combat service and work, represent the revolutionary heroism in the cause of national liberation, national defense and the protection the people".

The award also goes to collectives that meet this standard and are loyal to the socialist Fatherland of Vietnam, have maintained good internal unity, a clean and strong Party record, and mass organizations.

== Precursor ==
The precursor of this title was the Hero of the Military and Hero of the Liberate the South Force honors.

== See also ==
- Vietnam awards and decorations
