= Great National Unity Order =

Great National Unity Order Huân chương Đại đoàn kết dân tộc
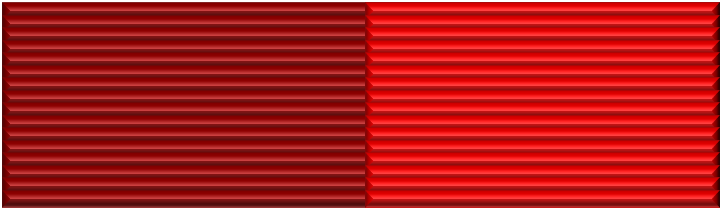
- Type: Single-grade order
- Awarded for: Individuals have rendered great meritorious services in the cause of building the great national unity block.
- Presented by: the Government of Vietnam
- Eligibility: Vietnamese civilians, military personnel
- Status: Currently awarded
- Established: 26 November 2003

Precedence
- Next (higher): Feat Order
- Next (lower): Bravery Order

The Great National Unity Order (Vietnamese: Huân chương Đại đoàn kết dân tộc) is a service award conferred by the Government of Vietnam for long process of devotion, have rendered great meritorious services. Specially, individuals have "rendered great meritorious services and recorded exceptionally outstanding achievements in the cause of building the great national unity block".

== See also ==
- Vietnam awards and decorations
