= Hero of Labour (Vietnam) =

Honors in the Socialist Republic of Vietnam

Hero of Labor Anh hùng Lao động
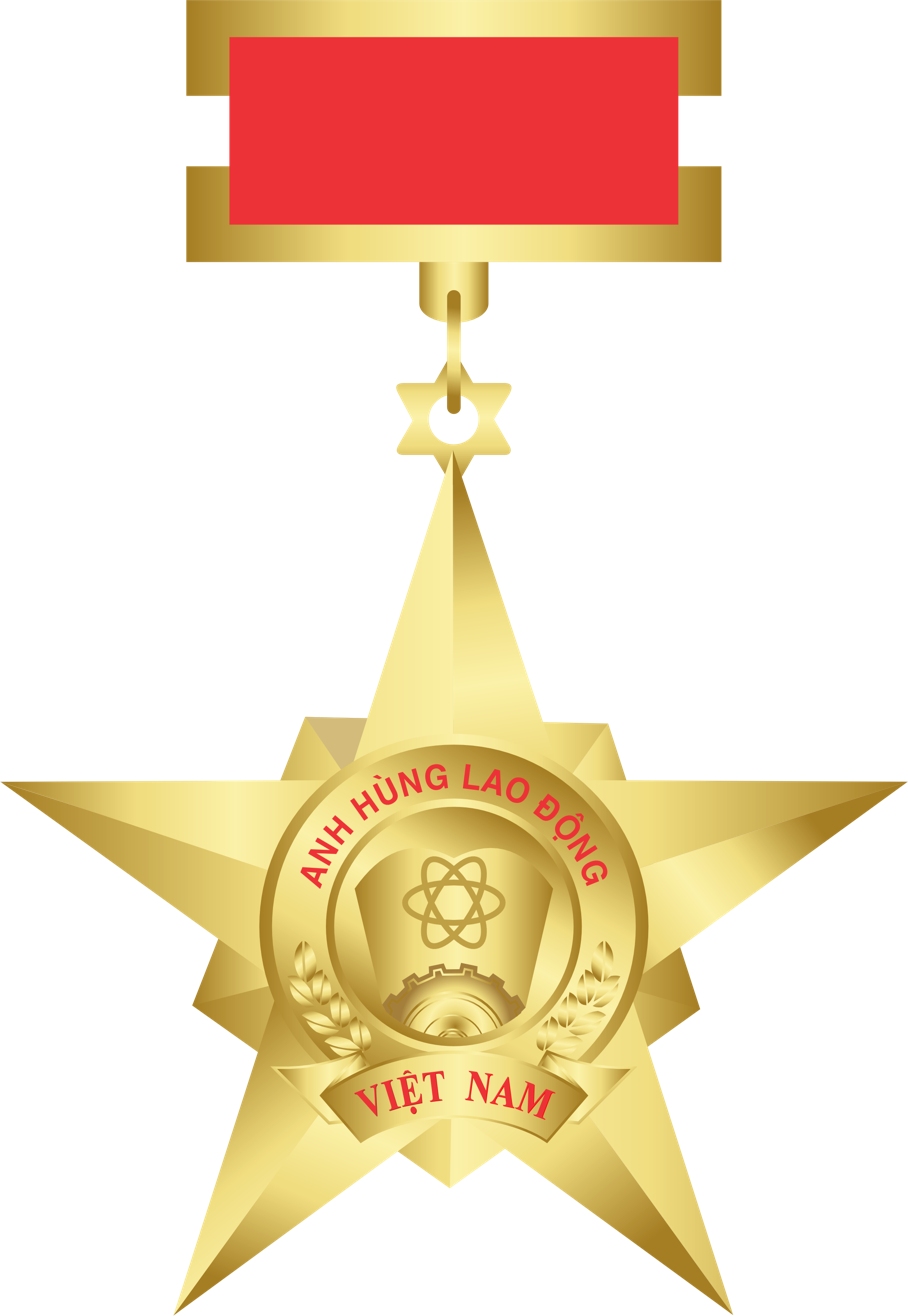
- Type: Single-grade order
- Awarded for: collective or individual labor brave and creative, is particularly outstanding achievements in production and work.
- Presented by: the Government of Vietnam
- Eligibility: Vietnamese civilians, military personnel, organisation and foreigners.
- Status: Currently awarded
- First award: 1970

The Hero of Labour (or Labour Hero) (Vietnamese: Anh hùng lao động) is the highest title of honor in the Socialist Republic of Vietnam. It is awarded (possibly posthumously) to individuals or collectives with outstanding achievements in labor. This includes supporting the objective of a strong country and an equitable, democratic, prosperous, and civilized society. Awardees are loyal to the Socialist Republic of Vietnam, and possess revolutionary virtues and qualities. It can be awarded to collectives for the same reasons that have maintained good internal unity, strong Party affiliations and mass organizations.

== History ==
This prize was officially created in 1970 by the National Assembly of Vietnam of the Democratic Republic of Vietnam. The National Assembly Standing Committee reviewed the proposal of the Government Council. However, the Congress of emulation fighters began awarding it in 1952.

In 1999, the Socialist Republic of Vietnam reestablished the prize. The 2003 Law of Emulation again renewed it.

== Recipients ==
=== Individuals ===
- Konstantin Feoktistov
- Andriyan Nikolayev
- Leonid Popov
- Valery Ryumin
- Valentina Tereshkova
- Trần Đại Nghĩa (1954)
- Boris Yegorov
- Phạm Tuân (1980), pilot, astronaut, lieutenant general of the Vietnam People's Army
- Mai Kieu Lien (2005)
- Trương Thái Sơn (2020), a worker of the Ho Chi Minh City Electricity Corporation
- Dr. Huỳnh Thị Phương Liên (2021), vaccine developer
- Dr. Trần Bình Giang (2020), director of Viet Duc Hospital
- Phạm Thị Huân (2020), chairwoman of Ba Huân JSC
- Thái Hương (2020), chairwoman of TH Group
- Trần Cẩm Nhung (2020), member of the Council of Vietnam Children's Fund
- Đặng Ái Việt (2020), painter
- Mai Đức Chung (2025), manager of Vietnam women's national football team

=== Collectives ===
- National Hospital of Tropical Diseases (2004)
- Vinatex (2016)
- PV Gas (2016)
- University of Medicine and Pharmacy of Ho Chi Minh City (2021)
- SSI Securities JSC (2020)
- Cao Lãnh District (2021)
- Thanh Hoa Provincial General Hospital (2021)
- Da Nang University of Science and Technology
- Vissan Company Limited
- Thai Nguyen Central Hospital (2021)
- Vietnam Bank for Social Policies (VBSP)
- Cholimex Food JSC
- Vietnam National University, Ho Chi Minh City (2020)
- Vietnam Electricity (2020)
- Nhơn Trạch District (2021)
- People's Procuracy of An Giang province (2021)

== See also ==
- Vietnam awards and decorations
- Hero of Socialist Labour
- Hero of Labor (North Korea)
- Hero of Labour (GDR)
