= Labour Order =

Labor Order Huân chương lao động
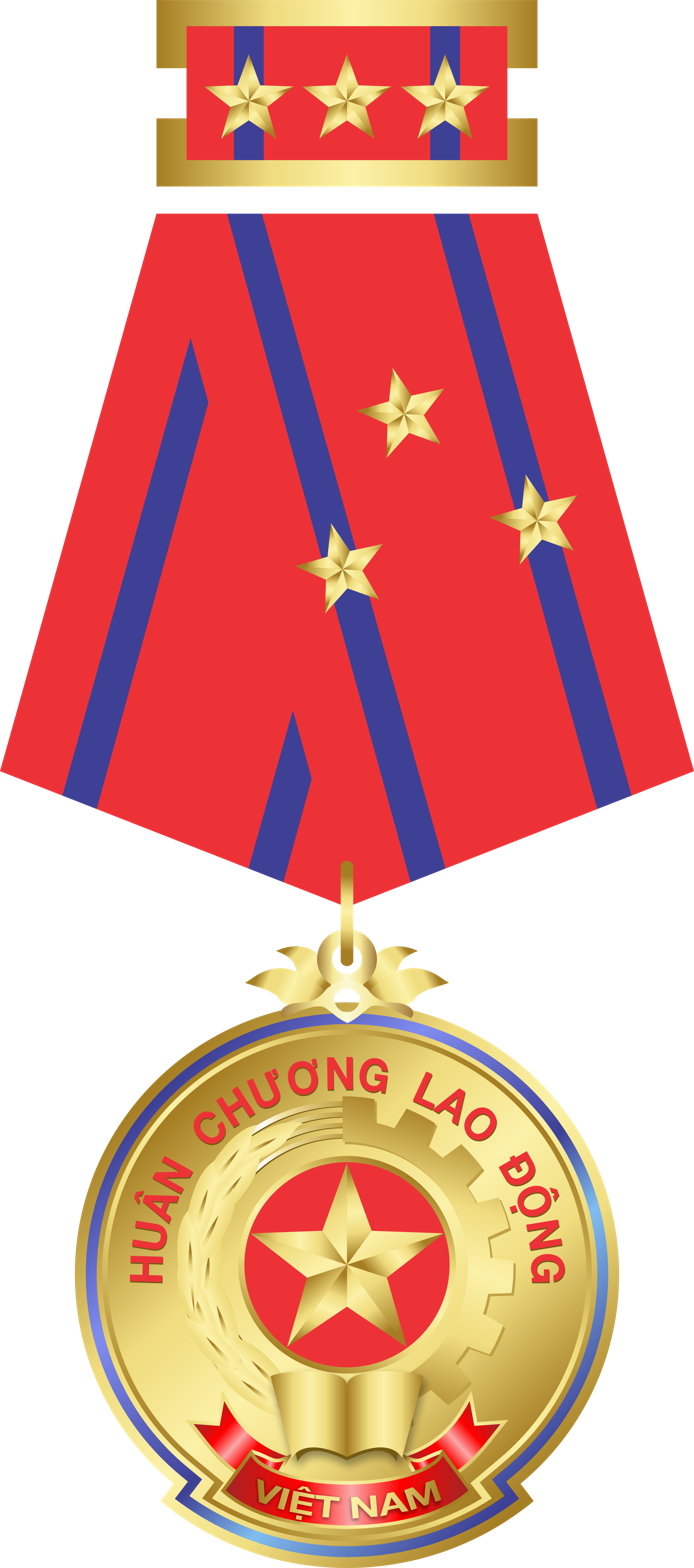
- Type: Single-grade order
- Awarded for: Individuals and collectives that have recorded outstanding achievements in labor, creativity or national construction.
- Presented by: the Government of Vietnam
- Eligibility: Vietnamese civilians, military personnel, and organization.
- Status: Currently awarded
- Established: 1 May 1950

Precedence
- Next (higher): Military Exploit Order
- Next (lower): Fatherland Defense Order

The Labour Order (Vietnamese: Huân chương lao động) is an award conferred or posthumously conferred by the Government of Vietnam on individuals and conferred on collectives that have recorded outstanding achievements in labor, creativity or national construction. There are three Labour Order awards. The basic award is the 3rd class which has one star, the 2nd class award has two stars and the highest 1st class award has three stars.

== Criteria ==
The Labor Order may be conferred or posthumously conferred on individuals who satisfy one of the following criteria:

- Having been conferred the second-class Labor Order and then the National Emulation Fighter title.
- Having inventions, scientific works or outstanding works of the State level;
- Having recorded unexpected exceptionally outstanding achievements or a long process of devotion in agencies, organizations or mass organizations.

It also be conferred on collectives which satisfy one of the following criteria:

- Having been conferred the second-class Labor Order, then the Excellent Labor Collective or Determined-to-Win Unit title for the subsequent five consecutive years, and the Emulation Flag of the ministerial-, branch-. provincial- or central mass organization-level for three times or the Government's Emulation Flag twice;
- Having recorded unexpected exceptionally outstanding achievements.

== Recipients ==
=== Individuals ===
- Dominic Scriven
- Mirosław Żuławski
- Võ Thị Thắng
- Park Hang-seo
- Kim Sang-sik
- Đỗ Duy Mạnh
- Nguyễn Quang Hải
- Nguyễn Xuân Son
- Nguyễn Hoàng Đức
- Nguyễn Tiến Linh
- Nguyễn Đình Triệu

=== Collectives ===
- Le Quy Don High School for the Gifted
- Vietnam national football team
- Nguyen Tat Thanh Lower and Upper Secondary School

== See also ==
- Vietnam awards and decorations
