= Feat Order =

Feat Order Huân chương Chiến công
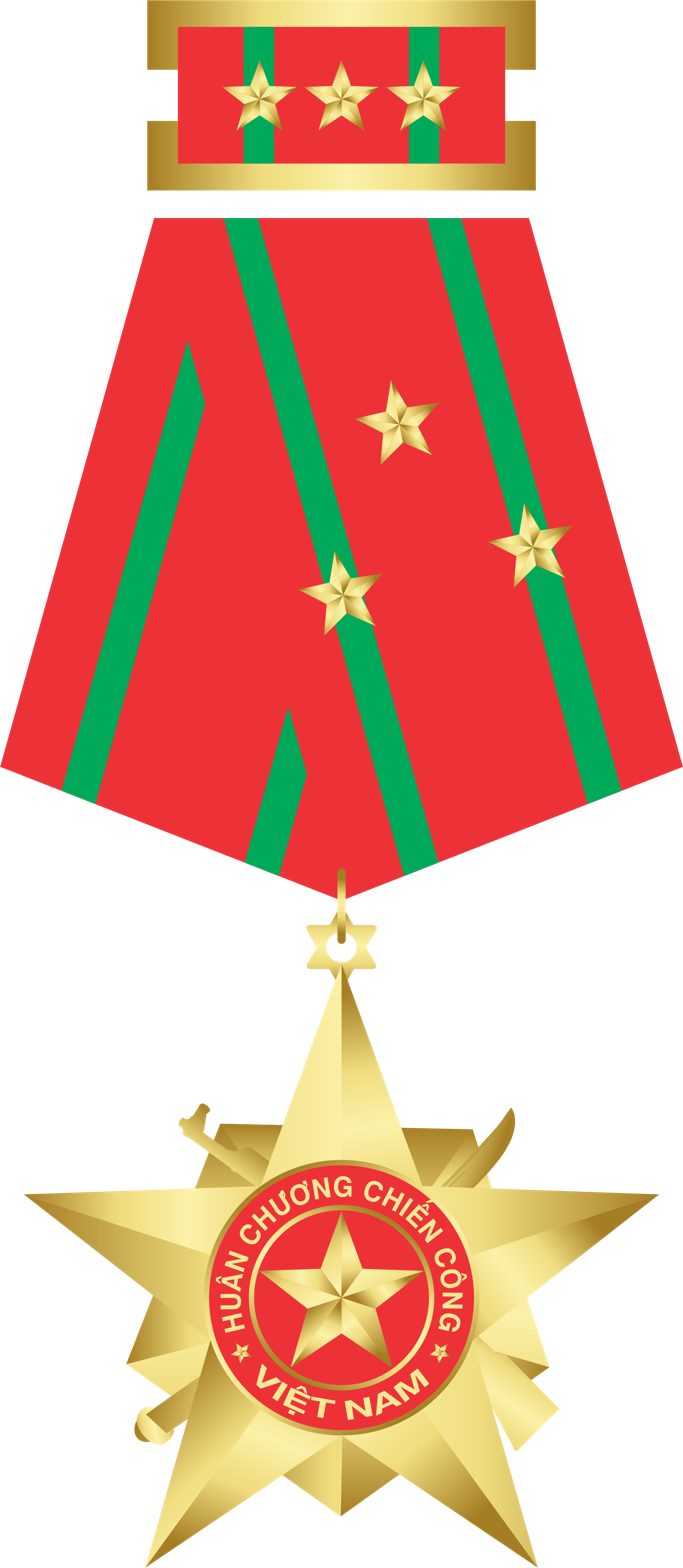
- Type: Single-grade order
- Awarded for: Individuals or collectives that have recorded exceptionally outstanding feats in combat or combat service.
- Presented by: the Government of Vietnam
- Eligibility: Vietnamese civilians, military personnel, and organization.
- Status: Currently awarded
- Established: 15 May 1947

Precedence
- Next (higher): Fatherland Defense Order
- Next (lower): Great National Unity Order

The Feat Order (Vietnamese: Huân chương chiến công) is a service award conferred by the Government of Vietnam for "exceptionally outstanding feats, brave, wise, creative in excellently fulfilled assigned tasks in combat service". It was established in 1947, and can be awarded to military personnel, individual civilians, or collectives.

== See also ==
- Vietnam awards and decorations
