= Order of Independence (Vietnam) =

Independence Order Huân chương Độc lập
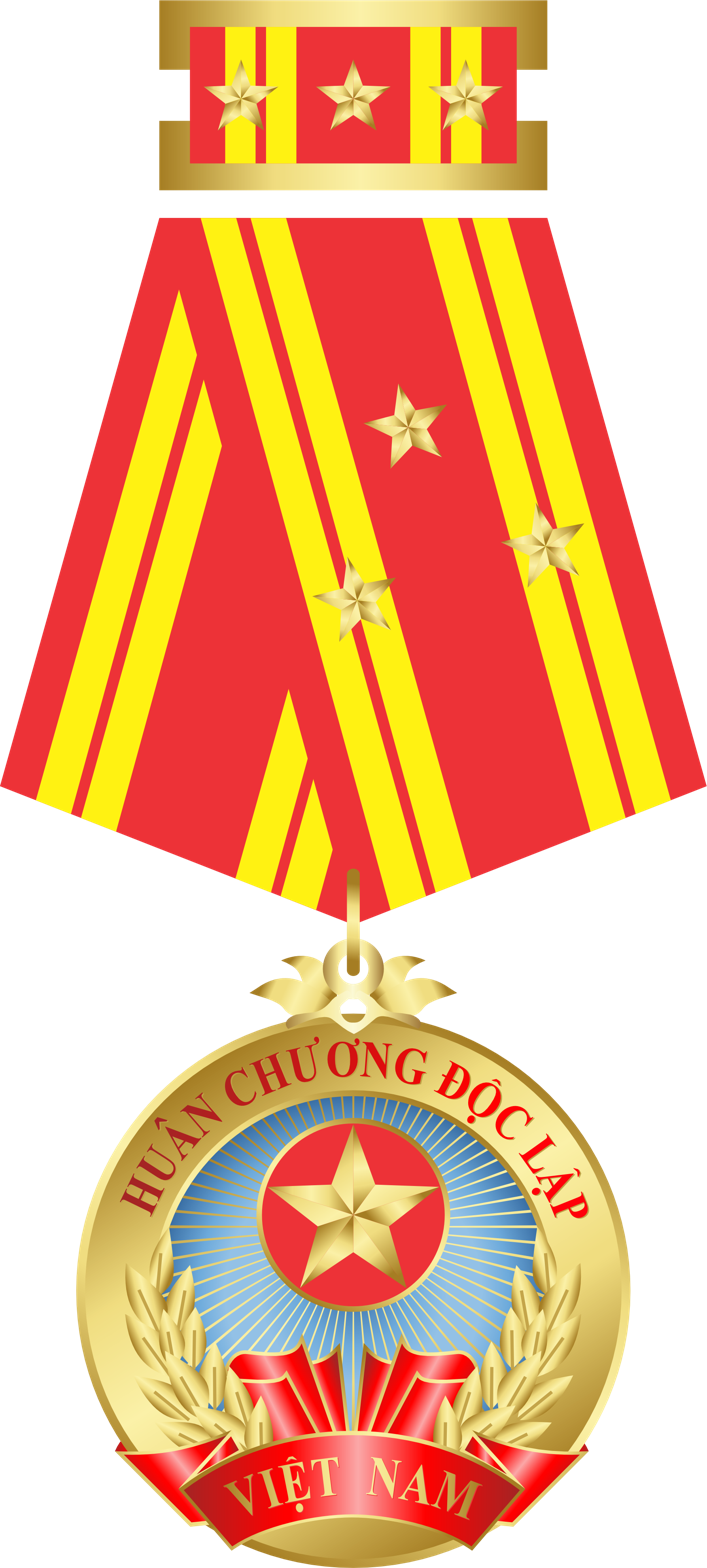
- Type: Single-grade order
- Awarded for: conferred or posthumously conferred on individuals who have recorded exceptionally outstanding achievements in one of the political, economic, social, literature, art, scientific, technological, defense, security, diplomatic or other domains.
- Presented by: the Government of Vietnam
- Eligibility: Vietnamese civilians, military personnel, and organization. Foreigners.
- Status: Currently awarded
- Established: 6 June 1947

Precedence
- Next (higher): Ho Chi Minh Order
- Next (lower): Military Exploit Order

Order of Independence or Independence Order (Vietnamese: Huân chương Độc lập) is a Vietnamese decoration.

== Criteria ==
The Vietnamese government states that the decoration "shall be conferred or posthumously conferred on individuals who have recorded exceptionally outstanding achievements in one of the political, economic, social, literature, art, scientific, technological, defense, security, diplomatic or other domains. It shall be conferred on collectives which satisfy the following criteria:"

- Having recorded outstanding achievements for five or more consecutive years before the time of nomination; having maintained internal unity, with clean and strong Party and mass organizations;
- Having a process of building and development of 30 years or more; if having been conferred the second-class "Independence Order," they must have a process of building and development of 25 years or more.

== See also ==
- Vietnam awards and decorations
