= Military Exploit Order =

Military Exploit Order Huân chương quân công
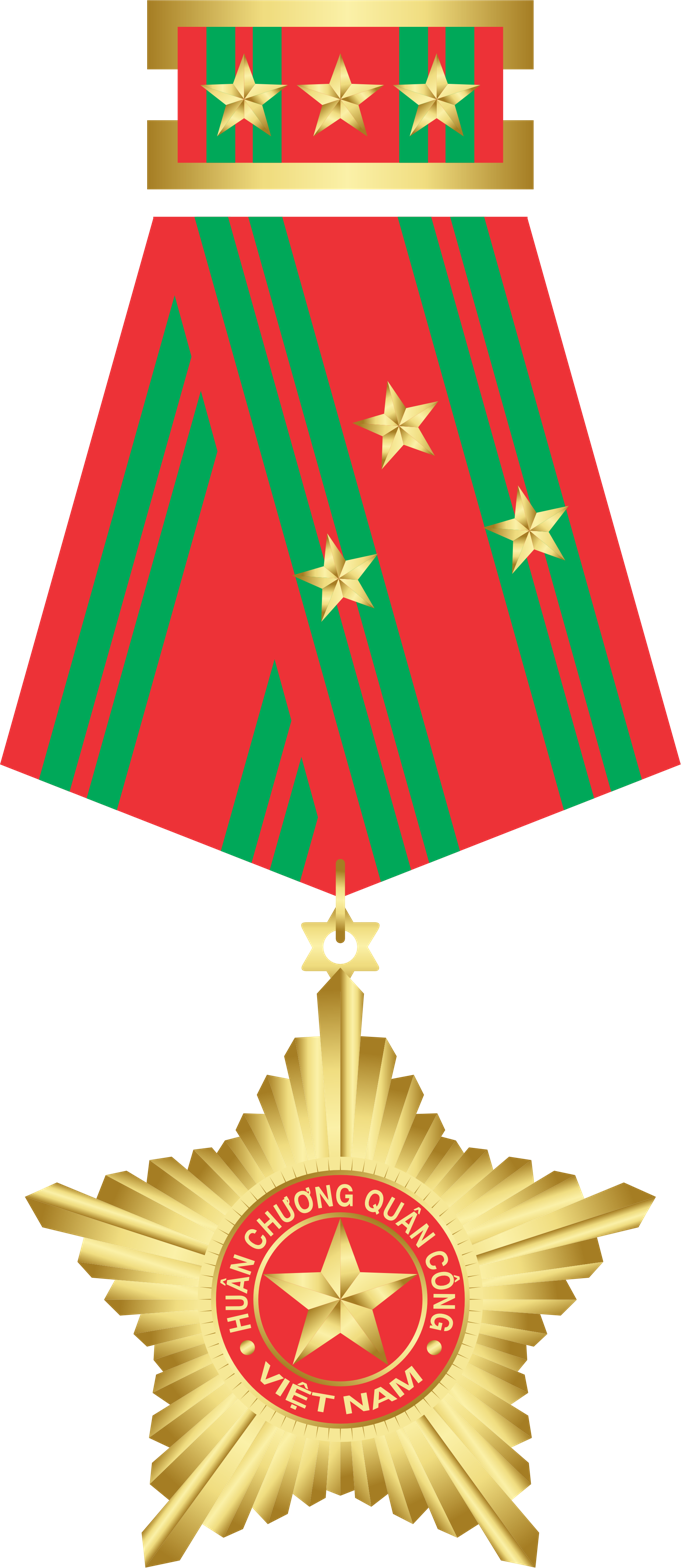
- Type: Single-grade order
- Awarded for: Individuals and collectives have recorded outstanding and brave exploits in combat, combat service, training, force building, consolidation of the all-people defense and people's security, or have sacrificed their lives heroically, setting bright examples in the whole country.
- Presented by: the Government of Vietnam
- Eligibility: Vietnamese civilians, military personnel, and organization.
- Status: Currently awarded
- Established: 15 May 1947

Precedence
- Next (higher): Independence Order
- Next (lower): Labor Order

The Military Exploit Order (Vietnamese: Huân chương quân công) is the highest military award of Vietnam. It is conferred or posthumously conferred on individuals who have recorded outstanding and brave exploits in combat, combat service, training, force building, consolidation of the all-people defense and people's security, or have sacrificed their lives heroically, setting bright examples in the whole country.

The Military Exploit Order may also be conferred on collectives which satisfy the following criteria:

- Having recorded outstanding achievements for five or more consecutive years before the time of nomination; having maintained internal unity, with clean and strong Party and mass organizations;
- Having a process of combat, combat service, training, building and growth of 30 years or more.

Order consists of three classes: I - three stars; II - two stars; III - one star.

== Gallery ==
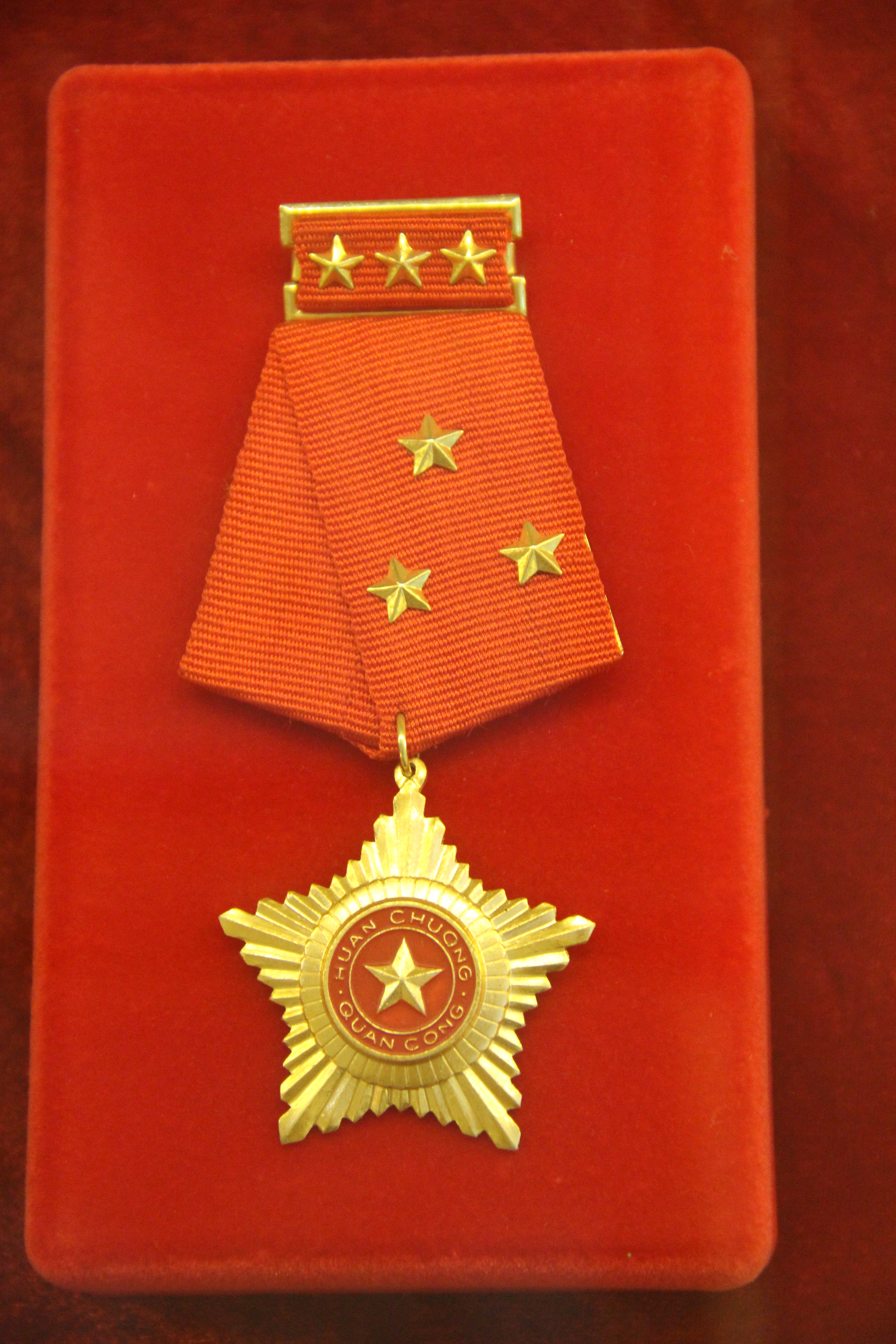
First Class Military Exploit Order displayed at Weapons Museum, Hanoi

== See also ==
- Vietnam awards and decorations
