= Insurgency in Laos =

Military conflict in Southeast Asia

- Part of the Cold War and the Third Indochina War
- Hmong refugees arrested and forcibly deported to Laos by the Thai army
Date	2 December 1975 – Present (to a lesser extent from June 2007) (50 years, 11 months, 1 week and 6 days)
Location	Southern Laos (royalists and rightists); central and northern Laos (Hmong rebels); Spillover into: Thailand
Result	Ongoing; Lao People's Democratic Republic victory, crackdown of Human Rights in Laos.

Belligerents
Laos; Lao People's Armed Forces; Vietnam; People's Army of Vietnam; Soviet Union (until 1989)	Lao Resistance Movement; Hmong insurgents; (Kingdom of Laos) Royalists: Lao National Liberation Front; Royal Lao Democratic Government (1982); Rightists; United Front for the Liberation of Laos

Commanders and leaders
(Laos) Thongloun Sisoulith; (Laos) Saleumxay Kommasith; (Laos) Viengthong Siphandone; (Vietnam) Tô Lâm; (Vietnam) Lê Minh Hưng; (Vietnam) Võ Thị Ánh Xuân; Former: (Laos) Souphanouvong; (Laos) Phoumi Vongvichit; (Laos) Nouhak Phoumsavanh; (Laos) Kaysone Phomvihane; (Laos) Khamtai Siphandone; (Laos) Choummaly Sayasone; (Laos) Bounnhang Vorachit; (Laos) Sisavath Keobounphanh; (Laos) Bouasone Bouphavanh; (Laos) Thongsing Thammavong; (Laos) Phankham Viphavanh; (Laos) Sonexay Siphandone; (Laos) Oudom Khattigna; (Laos) Pany Yathotou; (Laos) Bounthong Chitmany; (Vietnam) Lê Duẩn; (Vietnam) Trường Chinh; (Vietnam) Nguyễn Văn Linh; (Vietnam) Đỗ Mười; (Vietnam) Lê Khả Phiêu; (Vietnam) Nông Đức Mạnh; (Vietnam) Nguyễn Phú Trọng; (Vietnam) Tôn Đức Thắng; (Vietnam) Nguyễn Hữu Thọ; (Vietnam) Trường Chinh; (Vietnam) Võ Chí Công; (Vietnam) Lê Đức Anh; (Vietnam) Trần Đức Lương; (Vietnam) Nguyễn Minh Triết; (Vietnam) Trương Tấn Sang; (Vietnam) Trần Đại Quang; (Vietnam) Nguyễn Xuân Phúc; (Vietnam) Võ Văn Thưởng; (Vietnam) Lương Cường; (Vietnam) Phạm Văn Đồng; (Vietnam) Phạm Hùng; (Vietnam) Võ Văn Kiệt; (Vietnam) Phan Văn Khải; (Vietnam) Nguyễn Tấn Dũng; (Vietnam) Phạm Minh Chính; (Vietnam) Nguyễn Lương Bằng; (Vietnam) Chu Huy Mân; (Vietnam) Xuân Thủy; (Vietnam) Lê Thanh Nghị; (Vietnam) Huỳnh Tấn Phát; (Vietnam) Nguyễn Quyết; (Vietnam) Đàm Quang Trung; (Vietnam) Lê Quang Đạo; (Vietnam) Nguyễn Thị Định; (Vietnam) Nguyễn Thị Bình; (Vietnam) Trương Mỹ Hoa; (Vietnam) Nguyễn Thị Doan; (Vietnam) Đặng Thị Ngọc Thịnh; (Soviet Union) Leonid Brezhnev #; (Soviet Union) Yuri Andropov #; (Soviet Union) Konstantin Chernenko #; (Soviet Union) Mikhail Gorbachev; (Soviet Union) Nikolai Podgorny; (Soviet Union) Vasily Kuznetsov; (Soviet Union) Andrei Gromyko; (Soviet Union) Alexei Kosygin; (Soviet Union) Nikolai Tikhonov; (Soviet Union) Nikolai Ryzhkov; (Soviet Union) Valentin Pavlov; (Soviet Union) Ivan Silayev	(Kingdom of Laos) Soulivong Savang; Chonglor Her; Former: (Kingdom of Laos) Sisavang Vatthana #; (Kingdom of Laos) / Vang Pao #

Casualties and losses
- 40,000+ killed, 300,000 displaced

The insurgency in Laos is a low-intensity conflict between the Lao People's Democratic Republic on one side and former members of the Secret Army, Laotian royalists, Hmong fighters, and other highland Laotian ethnic minorities on the other. These groups have faced reprisals from the Lao People's Army and Vietnam People's Army for their support of the United States-aligned, anti-communist military campaigns in Laos during the Laotian Civil War, which the insurgency is an extension of itself. The North Vietnamese invaded Laos in 1958 and supported the communist Pathet Lao. The Vietnamese communists continued to support the Pathet Lao after the end of the Laotian Civil War and the establishment of the Lao People's Democratic Republic. At least 100,000 Hmong civilians were killed as the result of Laotian governmental policies, in what has sometimes been referred to as the Hmong genocide.

While severely depleted, the remnants of an early 1980s-era, and 1990s-era, royalist insurgency has been kept alive by an occasionally active guerrilla force of several thousand or so successors to that force. In June 2007, Vang Pao was arrested in the United States for an alleged plot to overthrow the Laotian communist government. His arrest led to an end of various attempts to overthrow the Laotian government by the Hmong people, the royalists, and right-wing rebellions.

== Insurgent history ==
=== Background ===
Vietnam and Laos have a complicated past. After Vietnam invaded and destroyed Laos during the Vietnamese–Laotian War, the Vietnamese didn't interfere in Laos for more than 200 years. However, Vietnamese influence had grown radically since the conquest, and played a major role in absorbing Laos into Vietnamese foreign policy. The Hmongs at the time had yet to be touched, owing to their neutrality to the Vietnamese and Laotians. The Hmongs maintained a degree of autonomy from the Imperial Vietnamese Government, and at the same time demonstrated their role in developing Laos in the aftermath of the disastrous war of 1470s with Vietnam. So while Vietnam kept interfering in Laotian affairs, the Hmongs were mostly left alone until the French conquest. Under French rule the Hmong mostly converted to Christianity, though large segments remained Buddhist, and allied with the French while maintaining their tie with Laos. This would put up the future conflict between Vietnam, the Laotian communists and Laotian insurgents.

=== Lao Hmong insurgency (Ongoing) ===
The conflict stems from three events prior to Laos independence: a failed coup attempt by the Red Prince Souphanouvong, Hmong aiding the French in Xieng Khoung against Lao and Vietnamese forces, and the French giving Hmong rights in Laos equal to the Lao.

In 1946, with the end of the Japanese occupation, Prince Souphanouvong and his half-brothers Prince Souvanna Phouma and Prince Phetsarath formed two separate independence governments, briefly overthrowing the Laos King Sisavang Vong, who wanted to hand the country back to the rule of imperial France. The Hmong people had, for over half a century, been closely allied with the French, who treated them as equals of the Lao people. Touby Lyfoung, an important Hmong leader, was decorated by the French administration for leading a combined French, Lao, and Hmong force to relieve the village of Xieng Khoung from a combined Communist force of Laotians and Vietnamese and saving the French representatives in the village. This action was part of the larger First Indochina War.

When the French withdrew from Indochina shortly after their defeat in the Battle of Dien Bien Phu, the Americans became increasingly involved in Laos due to the threat of Communist insurgents in Indochina. They saw Laos as one of dominoes in their Domino Theory. Under the leadership of the General Vang Pao, Hmong forces with US support prevented the Pathet Lao and their Vietnamese backers from toppling the Kingdom of Laos. They also rescued downed American pilots, and helped the US, from their base in the "secret city" of Long Tieng, to coordinate bombing missions over Vietnam and Laos.

By 1975, with the collapse of the South in the Vietnam War and loss of American support, the Pathet Lao was able to take control of the government. Hmong people, especially those who had participated in the military conflict were singled out for retribution.

Of the Hmong who remained in Laos, over 30,000 were sent to re-education camps as political prisoners where they served indeterminate, sometimes life, sentences. Enduring hard physical labor and difficult conditions, many people died. Thousands more Hmong people, mainly former soldiers and their families, escaped to remote mountain regions – particularly Phou Bia, the highest and least accessible mountain peak in Laos. At first, these loosely organized groups staged attacks against Pathet Lao and Vietnamese troops. Others remained in hiding to avoid conflict. Initial military successes by these small bands led to military counter-attacks by government forces, including aerial bombing and heavy artillery, as well as the use of defoliants and chemical weapons.

Today, most Hmong people in Laos live peacefully in villages and cities, but small groups of Hmong people, many of them second or third generation descendants of former CIA soldiers, remain internally displaced in remote parts of Laos, in fear of government reprisals. As recently as 2003, there were reports of sporadic attacks by these groups, but journalists who have visited their secret camps in recent times have described them as hungry, sick, and lacking weapons beyond Vietnam War-era rifles. Although they pose no military threat, the Lao government continues to characterize these people as "bandits" and attack their positions, using rape as a weapon and often killing and injuring women and children. Most casualties occur while people are gathering food from the jungle, since any permanent settlement is impossible.

Faced with continuing military operations against them by the government and a scarcity of food, some groups have begun coming out of hiding, while others have sought asylum in Thailand and other countries. In December 2009 a group of 4,500 refugees were forcibly repatriated to Laos from camps in Thailand despite the objections of, amongst others, the United Nations and the USA.

Some Hmong fled to California after the U.S. military withdrew from Vietnam and Laos, ending its wars in Indochina. In June 2005 as part of "Operation Tarnished Eagle" U.S. FBI and anti-terrorism officials allegedly uncovered a "conspiracy to murder thousands and thousands of people at one time" and violently overthrow the government of Laos. The alleged plot included ex-U.S. Army Rangers, former Green Berets and other guns for hire. The plotters were accused of attempting to use rifles, FIM-92 Stinger surface-to-air missiles, anti-tank rockets and other arms and munitions smuggled from the U.S. via Thailand to "reduce government buildings in Vientiane to rubble", said Bob Twiss, an assistant U.S. attorney.

Lieutenant-Colonel Harrison Ulrich Jack, a retired California National Guard officer who reportedly served in covert operations during the Vietnam War (in Laos in co-ordination with the Hmong and other tribal groups) and former General Vang Pao were named as the probable ringleaders of the purported coup plot. Vang Pao had reportedly built up a strong network of contacts within the U.S. government and corporate circles sympathetic to his cause. Some speculated that the proposed new government would be much more accepting of large foreign business and may also lead to an explosion of the drugs trade as has been the case in Afghanistan.

The defendants' lawyers argued that the case against all of their clients was spurious at best. "The case cannot proceed [because] the process has been so corrupted by the government's misconduct that there can never be any confidence in the validity of the charge," said Mark Reichel, one of the defense attorneys involved in the case. "[W]hile the [prosecution] tries to portray the 'conspiracy' as a dangerous and sophisticated military plan, it cannot refute the extensive evidence demonstrating otherwise – from the agent's informing the so-called conspirators that they would need an operational plan; to his providing a map of the region when they couldn't procure a useful one; to his explanation of what GPS was (including that it requires batteries); to the so-called conspirators' inability to finance the operation."

In 2008, according to a military official, the government ordered Laos troops to shoot to kill ethnic Hmong insurgents, including Hmong villagers hiding in the jungles. A cash reward is said to be given for every Hmong fighter killed. However, the government in Laos denied the authenticity of the order.

On 18 September 2009, the Federal Government dropped all charges against Vang Pao, announcing in a release that the "continued prosecution of this defendant is no longer warranted," and that the federal government was permitted to consider "the probable sentence or other consequences if the person is convicted.” That same year, Chong Lor Her became the leader of the ChaoFa party, which he still serves as today. On 2 October 2013, he claimed that the Laos military was using dogs to hunt down the Hmong.

After Xaisomboun became a province in December 2013, the military in Laos continued to increase their presence in the area by creating more military bases and bringing more soldiers into the region. The increased density of military installations and bases in the region has made it more difficult for the Hmong to go out and search for food without encountering soldiers. This has greatly threatened their survival and so has led to clashes between Hmong and the Lao military, leaving hundreds of Hmong dead or injured. ChaoFa president Her urged the international community to send his people immediate humanitarian aid, but without any luck.

On 8 April 2016, the Laos military launched a military incursion into the territory of Hmong communities in the Phou Bia area, reportedly with the help of Vietnamese forces. On 23 April, the military used a civilian helicopter to spray poison over Hmong territory. On 4 May, government forces attacked a Hmong village in Xaysomboun, killing two civilians. On 14 September, two Hmong men were taken away by Laos police from their village of Lat Houang. Later, they were found beaten to death on 23 September by a Laotian fisherman.

On 21 September 2016, the Laos military fired rockets loaded with toxic gas into Hmong areas killing a Hmong baby. On 6 October, another Hmong baby died from chemical poisoning.

In November 2017, the Laos government intensified its shelling of Hmong areas.

On 20 June 2020, a government soldier was shot and killed while on patrol inspecting for illegal poppy cultivation.

On 9 March 2021, one militant was killed in a clash with Laos soldiers in Thathom district, Xaysomboun. After the clash, the government sent troops to hunt down the escaped gunmen.

On 5 May 2025, militias linked to ethnic Hmong fighters and drug trafficking networks stormed Lao army outposts in Bokeo Province near Chiang Rai province in Thailand, killing five soldiers and isolating villages, with one stray round striking the roof of a Thai home.

From 17 May to 20 August 2025, the Unrepresented Nations and Peoples Organization (UNPO) alleged that ongoing military lockdowns and killings have trapped Hmong communities, with approximately 200 Hmong men arrested and 67 confirmed deaths. UNPO further alleged that women and children have been systematically denied access to food and medical care, creating a humanitarian crisis.

=== Royalist-in-exile insurgency (Ended) ===
Beginning in 1980, the anti-Communist, pro-Royalist forces organized under the so-called Lao National Liberation Front (LNLF) carried out their own insurgency in southern Laos; such of which had been initiated by a series of reasonably successful guerrilla warfare attacks upon its seizure of weapons from the militaries of Laos and Vietnam. In 1982, the LNLF succeeded in briefly establishing the Royal Lao Democratic Government (proclaimed in exile in Bangkok on 18 August 1982 earlier that year) in a collection of southern Lao provinces largely due to support and aid from the People's Republic of China, which despite being a communist state like Laos, maintained rather hostile relations with Laos (largely due to Laos' staunch alignment with and unequivocal support for Vietnam).

During this time, Laos was allied with the Soviet-backed communist Vietnamese government. The Lao government had referred to China's ruling clique as "the direct enemy of the Lao people" and further stated that relations could potentially be improved between itself and Thailand as well as with the United States, but gave no mention of a possibility for diplomatic amends with China. Despite allying itself formally in writing with Democratic Kampuchea (Cambodia under the Khmer Rouge; also communist) during the Third Congress of the Lao People's Revolutionary Party, allegations would surface that the Khmer Rouge (closely allied to China, and vehemently anti-Vietnamese and anti-Soviet) had also been funding and allotting supplies to the anti-communist Royalist insurgents for use in their insurgency against the government of Laos, while the majority of purported support would be divulged during the forever displaced regime's exile along the Thai border and perhaps to a lesser degree, in Thailand itself during the 1980s.

The Royalists had also cooperated and were involved to a limited degree in the attempts to overthrow the Vietnamese-backed People's Republic of Kampuchea alongside the Khmer Rouge. During the early 1980s, the Khmer Rouge had largely abandoned (or perhaps halted) communist ideals and were instead focused primarily on exuding Cambodian nationalist fervor and an increase in anti-Vietnamese rhetoric.

The Royalist insurgency gradually fell into disrepair and in terms of its 1970s and 1980s-era form, it has almost entirely vanished militarily as well as ideologically. A correlated movement of sporadic insurgents succeeded the LNLF and while divided into the congruent style of multiple minimally-proportioned bands of insurgents, have been estimated to contain a strength nearing 2,000 to 3,000 men as of the early 1990s.

=== Right-wing insurgency (Ended) ===
An insurgency politically correlative to the Royalist insurgency led by the United Front for the Liberation of Laos (LPNLUF) and minor allied similar groups had also transpired around the same time period, and reportedly was equipped with a strength of 40,000, Chinese and Khmer Rouge funded and trained right-wing insurgents who placed their desire to expel Vietnamese political and military standing in Laos above any other goal. While the movement managed to proclaimed their own provisional or "liberation" government (speedily disbanded by the Lao military), this insurgency proved to be as by chance less effective than the lesser-trained Royalist-focused insurgency.

This insurgency has no reported standing in terms of force within Laos today. While its claims have never been verified nor widely accepted, the LPNLUF claims to have put some one-third of Laotian territory under its provisional jurisdiction before it was put down by the Lao government.

The insurgents of the LNLF were largely former Royalist government officials who had fled into exile after the Kingdom of Laos' demise in 1975 in the conclusion of the Laotian Civil War and Vietnam War. The LNLF proved successful in recruiting fair numbers of rural militiamen from Champassak and Savannaket provinces. Individual units varied from as few as ten men to as many as 50, and all of these operated with little coordination.

== Human rights and refugee situation ==
In Laos, there exists a large population of CIA-trained Hmong veteran soldiers who fought as American allies against communist forces, which, during the insurgency were persecuted as collaborators. Fearing reprisals, retribution, retaliation and persecution, it is estimated that around half of the 300,000 Hmong in Laos fled or were displaced, some becoming refugees and settling in countries such as the United States.

== See also ==
- United Front for the Liberation of Oppressed Races
- FULRO insurgency against Vietnam
- 2007 Laotian coup d'état attempt
- Royal Lao Government in Exile
- Laotian Civil War
- The Center for Public Policy Analysis
