= List of central officeholders in the Communist Party of Vietnam =

List of prominent leaders of the Communist Party of Vietnam and the Socialist Republic of Vietnam:

Name	Central Committee	Standing Committee of the National Assembly	Politburo	Secretariat	Additional positions	Ref
Bich Zhan	1935-1936					
Bùi Bằng Đoàn		1946-1955 (Chief)			Vietnamese National Popular League (1947-1951)	
Bùi Lâm					Central Prosecutor (President, 1958-1960)	
Bùi San	1941-1945					
Bùi Thiện Ngộ			1991-1996		Minister of the Interior (1992-1996)	
Cầm Ngoan		1981-1987				
Chu Huy Mân			1976-1986		People's Liberation Armed Forces (Commander of the 5th Military Region, 1967-?), Council of State (1981-1987), Department of Politics of the People's Army of Vietnam (Chairman, 1977-1987), Dien Bien Phu Campaign (Commissioner of the 316th Division, 1954), Tet Offensive Campaign (Commander, 5th Military Region, 1968), Spring On defensive (Commissioner of the Hue–Da Nang Campaign, 1975)	
Chu Văn Tấn	1945-1960	1960-1979			PRG Minister of Defense (1945-Jan 1946); Provisional League Government (Jan-March 1946); Central Military Commission (1961)	
Cung Đình Quỳ		March-Nov 1946 (Vice Chief)				
Đàm Quang Trung				1986-1991	Council of State (1987-1992)	
Đào Đình Luyện					General Staff of the Army (1991-1995)	
Đào Duy Tùng			1986-1988 (alternative), 1988-1996	1986-1991, 1991-1996 (standing)		
Đào Trọng Lịch					General Staff of the Army (1997-1998)	
Dân Tôn Tử	1935-1936				Liberation Party Committee (1945)	
Dang Kim Giang					Dien Bien Phu Campaign (Chairman of Providing Campaign, 1954)	
Đặng Quân Thụy		1992-1996 (Vice Chairman)				
Dinh Duc Thien					Spring On defensive (Deputy Commander of the Ho Chi Minh Campaign, 1975)	
Đinh Thế Huynh			2011-2016	2011-2016		
Đặng Việt Châu					Deputy Prime Minister (1974-1976)	
Đặng Vũ Hiệp					Spring On defensive (Commissioner, 1975; Commissioner of 2nd Corps, 1975)	
Đinh Thanh	1935-1936 (standing)					
Đinh Văn Di	1937-1938					
Đỗ Bá Tỵ					General Staff of the Army (2010-?)	
Đỗ Mười					Deputy Prime Minister (Dec 1969-July 1976)	
Đỗ Quang Thắng			1993-1996	1991-1996	Commission of Inspection (Head, 1991-1996)	
Đào Văn Trường					Dien Bien Phu Campaign (Commander of the 351st Division, 1954)	
Đoàn Duy Thành					Council of Ministers (1987-1988)	
Đoàn Khuê			1991-1998		General Staff of the Army (1987-1991), Minister of Defence (1991-1996)	
Đồng Sĩ Nguyên			1982-1986 (alternative), 1986-1991		Council of Ministers (1982-1991)	
Đồng Văn Cống					People's Liberation Armed Forces (Vice Commander, 1965-1972), PRG (Deputy Minister of Defense, 1969-?)	
Dương Đức Hiền					Committee of National Liberation (standing, Aug-Sept 1945), Democratic Party of Vietnam (General Secretary)	
Dương Quốc Chính					Cochinchina (Political Commissar, 1948)	
Hà Huy Tập	1937-1938 (General Secretary), 1937-1940 (standing)				Overseas Executive Committee (1934-1936), Provisional Central Committee (General Secretary, 1936-1937)	
Hà Mạnh Trí					Supreme People's Procuracy (President, 1996-2007)	
Hà Thị Khiết				2006-2016		
Hồ Đức Việt			2006-2011	Aug 2006-2011	Party's Central Committee's Commission of Organisational Affairs (Head, 2006-2011)	
Hoàng Cầm					People's Liberation Armed Forces (Chief of the General Staff of the Army, 1970-1974; Vice Commander, 1970-1974), Spring On defensive (Battle of Xuân Lộc, 1975; Commander of 4th Corps, 1975)	
Hoàng Quốc Việt	1937-1938; 1941-1951 (standing); 1951-1960		1951-Oct 1956		Provisional Central Committee (Feb-Oct 1930; 1937-1938; standing 1940-1941); Secretary of the Việt Minh; President of the Supreme People's Procuracy (1960-1976); Vietnamese Fatherland Front Chairman (1977-1983; honorary, 1983-1992)	
Hồ Chí Minh	1945-1951 (standing), 1951-1960 (Chairman)		1951-1969	1956-1957 (General Secretary)	President of Democratic Republic of Vietnam (1945-1969), Committee of National Liberation (President, Aug-Sept 1945); PRG (President, 1945-1969; Minister of Foreign Affairs, 1945-Jan 1946); Provincial League Government (Jan-Mar 1946); Resistance League Government (President, March-Nov 1946); President of Vietnam (President, Nov 1946-1960; Minister of Foreign Affairs, Nov 1946-1960); Vietnamese National Popular League (Honorary Chairman, 1946-1951); Vietnamese National Popular Front (Honorary Chairman, 1951-1955); Vietnamese Fatherland Front (Honorary Chairman, 1955-1969)	
Hồ Xuân Lưu	1941-1945					
Hoàng Anh				1958-1976	Deputy Prime Minister (1971-1976)	
Hoàng Đạo Thúy					General Department of Politics of the Army (Chairman, 1946-1948)	
Hoàng Đình Giong	1935-1936 (standing member)					
Hoàng Minh Giám					New Government (Minister of Foreign Affairs, 1947-1954)	
Hoang Minh Thao					Dien Bien Phu Campaign (Commander of the 304th Division, 1954), Spring On defensive (Commander, 1975)	
Hoàng Minh Thi					Spring On defensive (Commissioner of 1st Corps, 1975)	
Hoang The Thien					Spring On defensive (Commissioner of the Battle of Xuân Lộc, 1975; Commissioner of 4th Corps, 1975)	
Hoàng Trường Minh		1987-1992				
Hoàng Trung Hải					Deputy Prime Minister (2007-2016)	
Hoàng Tùng				1980-1986		
Hoàng Văn Hoan	1945-1960	1957 (Vice Chief/General Secretary), 1960-1979 (Vice Chairman)	1956-1960 (Charge of National Assembly Works), 1960-1976		General Department of Politics of the Army Chairman (1946)	
Hoàng Văn Thái					General Staff of the Army (1945-1953, 1954), Central Military Commission (1961-?), Central Office for South Vietnam (Vice Secretary, 1967-1973), People's Liberation Armed Forces (Commander, 1967-1973), Dien Bien Phu Campaign (Chief, 1946)	
Hoàng Văn Nọn	1935-1936					
Hoàng Văn Thụ	1941-1945 (standing)				Provisional Central Committee (standing, 1940-1941), Tonkin Party Committee (Secretary, 1941-1944)	
Hồng Hà				1991-1996		
Huỳnh Cương		1981-1992				
Huỳnh Đảm					Vietnamese Fatherland Front (Chairman, 2008-2013)	
Huỳnh Ngọc Sơn		2007-2016 (Vice President)				
Huỳnh Tấn Phát					National Liberation Front for South Vietnam, PRG (Chairman of Government, 1969-?), Deputy Prime Minister, Council of State (1982-1989), Council of Ministers (1981-1982), Vietnamese Fatherland Front (Chairman, 1983-1988)	
Huỳnh Thúc Kháng					Resistance League Government (Acting President, 1946; Minister of the Interior, March-Nov 1946), New Government (Minister of the Interior, Nov 1946-1960), Vietnamese Popular League (Head, 1946-1947)	
Lâm Văn Tết					Alliance of National, Democratic and Peace Forces of Việt Nam (1968-?)	
Le Chuong					Dien Bien Phu Campaign (Commissioner of the 304th Division, 1954), Tet Offensive Campaign (Commissioner, Huế Front, 1968)	
Lê Duẩn	1938-1940 (supplementary; standing since 1939), 1945-1951 (supplementary), 1951-1960		1960-1976 (First Secretary), 1976-1986 (General Secretary)	1951-1960 (Chair); 1958-1960 (Acting General Secretary); 1960-1986)	Central Office for South Vietnam (Secretary, 1951-1957; Acting Secretary, 1957-1960; Vice Secretary, 1951-1960); Cochinchina Party Committee (Secretary, 1945-1946; 1946-1951; Secretary, 1954-1957); Central Military Commission (1961-1976)	
Lê Đức Anh			1982-1991, 1991-1996 (standing), 1997	1991-1996 (standing)	People's Liberation Armed Forces (Chief of the General Staff of the Army, 1964-1969; Vice Commander, 1963-1969), Minister of Defence (1987-1991), General Staff of the Army (1986-1987), President of Vietnam (1992-1996), Party Central Committee (Adviser, 1997-?), Tet Offensive Campaign (North Wing Commander, 1968), Spring On defensive (Deputy Commander of the Ho Chi Minh Campaign, 1975; Commander of 232 Group, 1975)	
Lê Đức Thọ	1944-1960, 1945-1948 (standing)		1955 (supplementary), 1960-1986)	1960-1982; 1982-1986 (Standing Secretary)	Chief of Organisation Department of the Central Communist Party (1956-1973; 1976-1980); Cochinchina Party Committee (Vice Secretary, 1948-1951); Central Office for South Vietnam (Vice Secretary, 1951-1954, 1968); Central Military Commission Vice Chairman (1982-1986); Party Central Committee (Adviser, 1986-1991)	
Lê Hồng Anh			2001-2016	2001-2016	Minister of Public Security (2002-2011)	
Lê Hồng Phong	1935-1938 (standing)			1938-?	Provisional Central Committee (1936-1937); Overseas Executive Committee (Secretary, 1934-1935)	
Lê Hữu Từ					Resistance League Government (Religion advisor/supplementary, March-Nov 1946)	
Lê Khả Phiêu	December 1997–April 2001 (General Secretary)		First elected to Politburo in January 1994; appointed to Standing Committee in June 1996	Elected to Party Central Secretariat in 1991	Director of General Political Department of People's Army of Vietnam from June 1991; Secretary of Central Military Commission from December 1997	
Lê Liêm					General Department of Politics of the Army (Chairman, 1949-1950), Dien Bien Phu Campaign (Chairman of Political Campaign, 1954)	
Lê Linh					Spring On defensive (Commissioner of 2nd Corps, 1975)	
Lê Mao	Feb-Oct 1930				Overseas Executive Committee (Oct 1930-1931)	
Le Minh					Tet Offensive Campaign (Commander, Huế Front, 1968)	
Lê Minh Hương			1996-2006		Minister of the Interior (1996-2002)	
Le Ngoc Hien					Spring On defensive (Acting Chief on Staff of the Ho Chi Minh Campaign, 1975)	
Lê Phước Thọ			1991-1996	1986-1996	Head of the Party's Central Committee's Commission of Organisational Affairs (1991-1996)	
Lê Quảng Ba					Dien Bien Phu Campaign (Commander of the 316th Division, 1954)	
Lê Quang Đạo		1987-1992 (Chairman)		1976-1986	Central Military Commission (1961-?), Council of State (1987-1992), Vietnamese Fatherland Front (Chairman, 1994-1999), Tet Offensive Campaign (Commissioner of Front Route 9, 1968), Deputy Chairman of the General Political Department	
Le Quang Hoa					Spring On defensive (Deputy Political Commissar/Chairman, 1975)	
Lê Thanh Đạo					Supreme People's Procuracy (President, 1992-1996)	
Lê Thanh Hải			2006-2016		Ho Chi Minh City Municipal Party Committee (Secretary, 2006-2011)	
Lê Thanh Nghị	1951-1960		1956-1982	1980-1982	Deputy Prime Minister (1960-1976, 1980-1982),Council of State (1981-1987)	
Lê Trọng Tấn					People's Liberation Armed Forces (Vice Commander, 1964-1971), General Staff of the Army (1978-1986), Dien Bien Phu Campaign (Commander of the 312th Division, 1954), Spring On defensive (Commander of the Hue–Da Nang Campaign, 1975; Battle of Xuân Lộc, 1975; Deputy Commander, 1975; Commander of the Southwest Border, 1975)	
Lê Xuân Tùng			1996-2001			
Lê Văn Dũng				2001-2011	General Department of Politics of the People's Army of Vietnam (Chairman, 2001-2011), General Staff of the Army (1998-2001)	
Lê Văn Lương	1947-1960		1951-1956 (alternate), 1976-1982	1956-1957, 1973-1976	Chief of Organisation Department of the CPV (1973-1976), Hanoi Party Committee (Secretary, 1976-1982)	
Lê Văn Tưởng					People's Liberation Armed Forces (Vice Political Commissar, 1972-?), Spring On defensive (Commissioner of 232 Group, 1975)	
Lưu Lập Đạo	Feb-Oct 1930 (supplementary)				Overseas Executive Committee (Oct 1930-1931)	
Mai Chí Thọ			1986-1991		Council of Ministers (1987-1988), Minister of the Interior (1987-1992), Tet Offensive Campaign (North Wing Commander, 1968)	
Mai Thúc Lân		1997-2002 (Vice Chairman)				
Nghiêm Xuân Yêm		1981-1987 (Vice Chairman)				
Ngô Đức Trì	Feb-Oct 1930 (supplementary)				Overseas Executive Committee (standing)	
Ngô Gia Tự						
Ngô Tuân	1935-1936 (standing)					
Ngô Văn Dụ			2011-2016	2006-2016		
Ngô Văn Tâm	1937-1938					
Ngô Xuân Lịch				2011-2016	General Department of Politics of the People's Army of Vietnam (2011-?)	
Ngô Xuân Lộc					Deputy Prime Minister (1997-1999)	
Nguyễn Ái Quốc	1935-1936, 1937-1940, 1941-1945				Provisional Central Committee (1936-1937)	
Nguyễn Bình					Armed Forces of the Cochinchina (Commander, 1945-?)	
Nguyễn Chánh					Cochinchina (?-1948), PRG (Deputy Minister of Defense, 1969-?)	
Nguyễn Chí Diểu	1937-1940 (standing)				Provisional Central Committee (1936-1937)	
Nguyễn Chí Thanh	1945-1960		1951-1967	1960-1967	Secretary of Annam Party Committee (1945-1948); General Department of Politics of the Army (Chairman, 1950-1961); Central Military Commission (1961-1967); Central Office for South Vietnam (Secretary, 1964-1967); People's Liberation Armed Forces (Political Commissar, 1964-1967), National Uprising Committee (August Revolution, Huế chapter)	
Nguyễn Cơ Thạch			1982-1986 (alternative), 1986-1991		Minister of Foreign Affairs (1980-1991), Council of Ministers (1987-1991)	
Nguyễn Côn	1996-2001		1982-1991, 1991-Dec 1997 (General Secretary/standing)	1986-1988, 1991-1996 (standing)	Deputy Prime Minister (Nov 1967-1976), Council of Ministers (1988); Chairman, 1988-1991)	
Nguyễn Đăn					Cochinchina (Chief of General Staff, 1948-?)	
Nguyễn Đình Tứ			1996	1991-1996		
Nguyễn Đóa					PRG (1969-?)	
Nguyễn Đức Bình			1991-2001			
Nguyễn Đức Cảnh					Tonkin Party Committee (Secretary)	
Nguyễn Đức Kiên		2007-2011 (Vice)				
Nguyễn Đức Tâm						
Nguyễn Duy Trinh	1951-1960		1956-1982	1955-1960, 1976-1982	Central Communist Party Committee Office (Chairman, 1958-1960), Deputy Prime Minister (1960-1980), Minister of Foreign Affairs (1965-1980), Central Military Commission (1961-?)	
Nguyễn Dy Niên					Minister of Foreign Affairs (2000-2006)	
Nguyễn Hà Phan		1992-1996 (Vice Chairman)	1993-1996	1991-1996	Central Committee for Economy (Chief, 1991-1996)	
Nguyễn Hải Thần					Provisional League Government (Vice President, Jan-March 1946), Resistance League Government (Vice President, March-Nov 1946)	
Nguyễn Hòa					Spring On defensive (Commander of 1st Corps, 1975)	
Nguyễn Hòa Bình					Supreme People's Procuracy (President, 2011-?)	
Nguyễn Hới					Provisional Central Committee (standing; Feb-Oct 1930)	
Nguyễn Hữu An					Spring On defensive (Commander of 2nd Corps, 1975)	
Nguyễn Hữu Thọ					National Liberation Front for South Vietnam (Chairman)	
Nguyễn Hữu Tiến	1939-1940 (supplementary)					
Nguyễn Hữu Xuyến		1981-1987 (Chairman)			People's Liberation Armed Forces (Vice Commander, 1965-1974), PRG Consultative Council (Chairman, 1969-?), Vice President of Vietnam (1979-1980), Acting President (1980-?), Council of State (Vice Chairman, 1981-1992), Vietnamese Fatherland Front (Chairman, 1988-1994; honorary chairman, 1994-1996)	
Nguyễn Khắc Nghiên					General Staff of the Army (2006-2010)	
Nguyễn Khang					National Uprising Committee (August Revolution, Hanoi chapter)	
Nguyễn Khánh				1986-1991	Council of Ministers (1987-1992), Deputy Prime Minister (1992-1996)	
Nguyễn Khoa Điềm			2001-2006	2001-2006	Central Propaganda Department (Chief, 2001-2006)	
Nguyễn Lam				1976-1986	Deputy Prime Minister (1980-1981), Council of Ministers (1981-1982)	
Nguyễn Lương Bằng	1943-1945, 1945-1951 (standing), 1948-1951 (supplementary), 1951-1960				Việt Minh; Committee of National Liberation (Aug-Sept 1945); Vice President (1969-1979)	
Nguyễn Mạnh Cầm			1993-1996 (supplemental), 1996-2001		Minister of Foreign Affairs (1991-2000), Deputy Prime Minister (1997-2002)	
Nguyễn Minh Châu					People's Liberation Armed Forces (Chief of the General Staff of the Army, 1969-1970, 1974-1975)	
Nguyễn Minh Triết			Dec 1997-2011		President of Vietnam (2006-2011)	
Nguyễn Phong Sắc	Oct 1930-1931				Provisional Central Committee (Feb-Oct 1930), Annam Party Committee (Secretary)	
Nguyễn Phú Trọng		2006-2011 (Chairman)	Dec 1997-Aug 1999 (supplementary), Aug 1999-2016	2011-2016	Central Military Commission (Secretary, 2011-2016)	
Nguyễn Phúc Thanh		1997-2002, 2002-2007 (Vice Chairman)				
Nguyễn Quyết				1986-1991	General Department of Politics of the People's Army of Vietnam (Chairman, 1987-1991), Council of the State (Vice Chairman, 1987-1992), National Uprising Committee (August Revolution, Hanoi chapter)	
Nguyễn Sinh Hùng		2011-2016 (Chairman)	2006-2016		Deputy Prime Minister (2006-2011), National Assembly Party Caucus (Secretary)	
Nguyễn Sơn					Resistance Administration Committee of the South Vietnam (Chairman, Dec 1945-Dec 1946)	
Nguyễn Tấn Dũng			1996-2016		Deputy Prime Minister (1997-2006), Prime Minister (2006-2016), Government Party Committee (Secretary)	
Nguyễn Thanh Bình			1986-1991	1982-1986 (alternative), 1988-1991		
Nguyễn Thành Diên	1941-1945					
Nguyễn Thị Bình		1992-2002 (Vice President)			PRG (Minister of Foreign Affairs, 1969-?)	
Nguyễn Thị Định					People's Liberation Armed Forces (Vice Commander, 1963-1969), Council of State (Vice Chairman)	
Nguyễn Thị Doan		2007-2016 (Vice President)				
Nguyễn Thị Kim Ngân		2011-2016 (Vice President)	2013-2016	2011-2016		
Nguyễn Thị Xuân Mỹ			1996-2001			
Nguyễn Thiện Nhân			2013-2016		Deputy Prime Minister (2007-2013), Vietnamese Fatherland Front (2013-?)	
Nguyễn Thị Ngọc Phượng		1987-1992				
Nguyễn Thị Thập		1969-1981				
Nguyễn Trọng Nhã	Oct 1930-1931				Provisional Central Committee (supplementary; Feb-Oct 1930)	
Nguyễn Văn Hiện					People's Supreme Court (President, 2002-2007)	
Nguyễn Tường Tam				Resistance League Government (Minister of Foreign Affairs, March-Nov 1946)		
Nguyễn Văn An		2001-2006 (Chairman)	1996-2001	March–June 2001		
Nguyễn Văn Chi				Jan 2003-2011	Commission of Inspection (Head, 2006-2011)	
Nguyễn Văn Chính					Council of Ministers (1987-1988)	
Nguyễn Văn Cừ	1937-1940 (standing), 1938-1940 (General Secretary)			1938-1940		
Nguyễn Văn Dựt	1935-1936 (standing)				Overseas Executive Committee (1934-1935)	
Nguyễn Văn Hiếu					National Liberation Front for South Vietnam (General Secretary)	
Nguyễn Văn Hưởng				Communist Party		
Nguyễn Văn Kiệt					PRG (Vice Chairman, 1969-?)	
Nguyễn Văn Kỉnh					Cochinchina Party Committee (Vice Secretary)	
Nguyễn Văn Linh			1976, 1982-1985, 1985-1986 (supplementary), 1986-1991 (General Secretary)	1976-1986, 1986 (standing), 1986-1991	Cochinchina Party Committee (Acting Secretary, 1957-1960), Central Office for South Vietnam (Secretary, 1961-1964; 1964-?), Ho Chi Minh City Party Committee (Secretary, 1976-1982), Central Committee for People Campaigning and Front (Chief, 1976-1982), Party Central Committee (Adviser, 1991-2001)	
Nguyễn Văn Tố		March-Nov 1946 (Chief)				
Nguyễn Văn Trân				1961-1976		
Nguyễn Văn Trọng	1937-1938					
Nguyễn Văn Vinh					Central Military Commission (1961-1963)	
Nguyễn Xiển		1960-1987			Socialist Party of Vietnam (Secretary, 1960-194)	
Nguyễn Xuân Phúc			2011-2016		Government Party Committee (Deputy Secretary), Deputy Prime Minister (2011-2016)	
Nguyễn Văn Yểu		1997-2007				
Nông Đức Mạnh	2006-2011 (General Secretary)	1992-2001 (Chairman)	1991-2011	2001-2011		
Phạm Bình Minh					Deputy Prime Minister (2013-2016), Minister of Foreign Affairs (2011-2016)	
Phạm Gia Khiêm			2006-2011		Deputy Prime Minister (1999-2011), Minister of Foreign Affairs (2006-2011)	
Phạm Hùng	1951-1960		1956-1988	1958-1976	New Government (Deputy Prime Minister, Nov 1946-1960), Cochinchina Party Committee (Secretary, 1946), Central Office for South Vietnam (1952-1954; Secretary, 1967-1975), Deputy Prime Minister (1960-1981), People's Liberation Armed Forces (1967-1975), Minister of Interior (1980-1987), People's Supreme Court (President, 1981-1997), Council of State (1981-1987), Council of Ministers (Chairman, 1987-1988), Spring On defensive (Political Commissar of the Ho Chi Minh Campaign, 1975)	
Phạm Hữu Lầu					Provisional Central Committee (Feb-Oct 1930), Cochinchina Party Committee (Secretary, 1957-1959)	
Phạm Ngọc Mậu					Dien Bien Phu Campaign (Commissioner of the 351st Division, 1954)	
Phạm Thanh Ngân			Dec 1997-2001		General Department of Politics of the People's Army of Vietnam (Chairman, 1998-2001)	
Phạm Thái Bường					People's Liberation Armed Forces (Political Commissar, 1961-1962), Central Office for South Vietnam	
Phạm Thế Duyệt			1991-2001	1986-1991	Vietnamese Fatherland Front (Chairman, 1999-2008)	
Phạm Quang Nghị			2006-2016		Hanoi Municipal Party Committee (Secretary, 2006-2011)	
Phạm Văn Bạch					Administration Committee of the Cochinchina (1945-1946), Resistance Administration Committee of Cochinchina (1946), People's Supreme Court (President, 1956-1981)	
Phạm Văn Đồng	1947-1960	March-Nov 1946 (Vice Chief)	1951-1976	1951-1960	Committee of National Liberation (standing, Aug-Sept 1945), Deputy Prime Minister (1947-1960), Socialist Party of Vietnam (1954-1960), Prime Minister (1955-1971), Minister of Foreign Affairs (1960-1961)	
Phạm Văn Trà			1996-2006		General Staff of the Army (1995-1997), Minister of Defence (1997-2006)	
Phạm Văn Xô	1935-1936					
Phan Anh		1981-1987			Resistance League Government (Minister of Defence, March-Nov 1946)	
Phan Đăng Lưu	1937-1938; 1938-1940 (supplementary/standing since 1939)				Provisional Central Committee (1940-1941)	
Phan Diễn			Dec 1997-2006	2001-2006 (standing)		
Phan Đình Hy	1935-1936					
Phan Trọng Tuệ					Deputy Prime Minister (1974-1976)	
Phùng Chí Kiên	1937-1940, 1941-1945			Provisional Central Committee (1936-1937), Overseas Executive Committee (1945-1946)		
Phan Kế Toại					New Government (Acting Minister, 1947-1960; Minister of the Interior, 1947-1964); Deputy Prime Minister, 1958-1975)	
Phan Văn Đáng					Central Office for South Vietnam (Secretary)	
Phan Văn Khải			1991-2006		Council of Ministers (Vice Chairman, 1991-1992), Deputy Prime Minister (1992-1996), Prime Minister (1997-2006)	
Phùng Quang Thanh		2006-2007	2006-2016		Minister of Defence (2006-2016), General Staff of the Army (2001-2006)	
Phùng Văn Cung					National Liberation Front for South Vietnam (Vice Chairman), PRG (1969-?)	
Phùng Văn Tửu		1987-1992				
Song Hào				1976-1982	General Department of Politics of the Army (1961-1976), Central Military Commission (1961-?), Dien Bien Phu Campaign (Commissioner of the 308th Division, 1954)	
Tạ Quang Bửu					New Government (Vice Minister of Defense, 1947-1960; Minister of Defence, 1947-1948)	
Thích Đôn Hậu					Alliance of National, Democratic and Peace Forces of Việt Nam (Vice Chairman, 1968-?)	
Thích Thế Long		1981-1987				
Tố Hữu			1976-1980 (alternative), 1980-1986	1958-1982 (Head, PCC Commission for Propaganda and Training)	Deputy Prime Minister (1980-1982), Council of Ministers (Vice Chairman, 1981-1986), National Uprising Committee (August Revolution, Huế chapter)	
Tô Huy Rứa			2006-2016	2006-2016		
Tôn Đức Thắng	1947-1960	1946-1948 (Vice Chief), 1948-1955 (Acting Chief), 1995 (Chief)			Resistance Committee of the Cochinchina (Chairman, 1945), Armed Forces of the Cochinchina (Chief, 1945), Vietnamese National Popular League(Deputy Head, 1946-1951), Vietnamese National Popular Front (Chairman, 1951-1955), Vietnamese Fatherland Front (Chairman, 1955-1976; Honorary Chairman, 1977-1980), Cochinchina Party Committee (Secretary, 1945), Vice President of Vietnam (1960-1969), President of Vietnam (1969-1981)	
Tôn Quang Phiệt		1960 (Vice Chief/General Secretary)				
Tòng Thị Phóng		2007-2016 (Vice President), ?-? (Deputy Secretary)	2011-2016	2001-2011		
Tống Văn Trân	1935-1936					
Trần Bạch Đằng					Tet Offensive Campaign (South Wing Commander, 1968)	
Trần Công Tường					People's Supreme Court (President, 1958-1959)	
Trần Đại Quang			2011-2016		Minister of Public Security (2011-2016)	
Trần Đăng Khoa		1960-1981			Democratic Party of Vietnam	
Trần Đăng Ninh	1941, 1945-1955					
Trần Đình Hoan			2001-2006	2001-2006	Party's Central Committee's Commission of Organisational Affairs (2001-2006)	
Trần Độ		1987-1992 (Vice Chairman)			Central Military Commission (1961-?), People's Liberation Armed Forces(Political Commissar, 1964-?), Dien Bien Phu Campaign (Commissioner of the 312th Division, 1954)	
Trần Đức Lương			1996-2006		Council of Ministers (1987-1992), Deputy Prime Minister (1992-1996), President (1997-2006)	
Tran Hai Phung					Tet Offensive Campaign (South Wing Commander, 1968)	
Trần Hữu Dực					Deputy Prime Minister (1974-1976), Supreme People's Procuracy (President, 1981-1987)	
Trần Huy Liệu					Việt Minh; Committee of National Liberation (Vice President, Aug-Sept 1945); Department of Politics of Resistance Committee (Chairman, 1946)	
Trần Kiên			1982-1986 (alternative), 1986-1991			
Trần Nam Trung					People's Liberation Armed Forces (Political Commissar, 1962-1964), PRG (Minister of Defence, 1969-?), Central Office for South Vietnam	
Trần Phương					Council of Ministers (1982-1986)	
Trần Phú		Oct 1930-1931 (General Secretary/standing			Provisional Central Committee (July-Oct 1930)	
Trần Quyết			1982-1991	1986-1991	Supreme People's Procuracy (President, 1987-1992), Chief of Organisation Department of the Central Communist Party (1982-1986)	
Trần Quốc Hoàn	1951-1960		1960-1972 (alternate), 1972-1976	1980-1982)	New Government (Minister of Public Security, 1952-1981), Central Military Commission (1961-?)	
			1986-1991			
Trần Quốc Vượng				2013-2016	Supreme People's Procuracy (President, 2007-2011)	
Trần Quý Hai					Central Military Commission (1961-?), Tet Offensive Campaign (Commander of Front Route 9, 1968), Deputy Chief of the General Staff	
Trần Quỳnh				1986-1991	Deputy Prime Minister (1981), Council of Ministers (1981-1987)	
Trần Tử Bình		1981-1987			National Uprising Committee (August Revolution, Hanoi chapter)	
Trần Văn Giàu					Cochincina Party Committee (Secretary, 1943-1945); Provisional Committee of the Cochinchina (Chairman, Aug 1945); Administration Committee of the Cochinchina (Chairman, 1945); Armed Forces of the Cochinchina (Chief, 1945-1946), National Uprising Committee (August Revolution, Ho Chi Minh City chapter)	
Trần Văn Kiết					Overseas Executive Committee (March 1936)	
Trần Văn Lan	Oct 1930-1931				Provisional Central Committee (Feb-Oct 1930)	
Trần Văn Quang					People's Liberation Armed Forces (Commander, 1961-1963), Tet Offensive Campaign (Commander of the Military Region Tri-Thien, 1968), Deputy Chief of the General Staff	
Trần Văn Trà					Central Military Commission (1961-?), People's Liberation Armed Forces (Commander, 1963-1967, 1973-1975; Vice Commander, 1967-1973), Tet Offensive Campaign (North Wing Commander, 1968), Spring On defensive (Battle of Xuân Lộc, 1975; Commander of the Ho Chi Minh Campaign, 1975)	
Trần Xuân Bách			1986-March 1990	1982-1991		
Trịnh Đình Cửu					Provisional Central Committee (standing, Feb-Aug 1930)	
Trịnh Đình Thảo					Alliance of National, Democratic and Peace Forces of Việt Nam (Chairman, 1968-?)	
Trịnh Hồng Dương					People's Supreme Court (President, 1997-2002)	
Trường Chinh	1941-1951 (General Secretary/standing), 1951-1960 (General Secretary)	1960 (Chairman), 1964-1975 (Chairman), 1976-1981 (Chairman)	1951-1956 (General Secretary), 1960-1982, 1986 (General Secretary)	1956-1957	Provisional Central Committee (Acting General Secretary/standing, 1940-1941), Deputy Prime Minister (1958-1960), Council of the State (Chairman, 1981-1987); Party Central Committee (Adviser, 1986-1988), National Uprising Committee (Head - August Revolution)	
Trương Hòa Bình					People's Supreme Court (President, 2007-?)	
Trương Mỹ Hoa		1997-2002, 2002-2007 (Vice President)		1991-1996		
Trương Quang Được		2002-2007 (Vice Chairman)	2001-2006			
Trương Tấn Sang			1996-2006, 2006-2011 (standing), 2011-2016	2006-2011 (standing), 2011-2016	President of Vietnam (2011-2016)	
Trương Vĩnh Trọng			2006-2011	2001-2011	Deputy Prime Minister (2006-2011)	
Uông Chu Lưu		2007-2016 (Vice President)				
Ung Văn Khiêm	1951-1960				Minister of the Interior (1961-1963)	
Văn Tiến Dũng			1960-1972 (alternate), 1972-1986		Tonkin Party Committee (Secretary, 1944-1945); General Department of Politics of the Army (Chairman, 1945-1949); General Staff of Army (1953-1978); Central Military Commission (1961-1976); Minister of Defence (1980; 1981-1987), Spring On defensive (Commander of the Ho Chi Minh Campaign, 1975)	
Võ Chí Công			1976-1991, 1991-1996 (standing)	1980-June 1986 (standing), 1991-1996 (standing)	Central Office for South Vietnam (Vice Secretary, 1961-?), National Liberation Front for South Vietnam (1961-?), Deputy Prime Minister (1976-1981), Council of Ministers (1981-1982, 1986-1987), Council of State (Chairman, 1987-1992), Party Central Committee (Adviser, 1996-1997), Tet Offensive Campaign (Commander/Secretary, 5th Military Region Party Committee, 1968)	
Võ Nguyên Giáp	Aug 1945; 1945-1951 (standing); 1951-1960		1951-1982	1951-1960	PRG (Minister of Interior/Vice Minister of Defense, 1945-Jan 1946); Provisional League Government (Minister of the Interior/Minister of Defence, Jan-Mar 1946); Resistance League Government Resistance Committee (Chairman, March-Nov 1946); New Government (Vice Minister of Defense, 1947-1948; Minister of Defence, Nov 1946-1947; 1948-1960); Deputy Prime Minister (1955-1991); Commander-in-Chief of the Armed Forces (1946-1980); Minister of Defence (1960-1980); Central Military Commission (Secretary, 1961); Council of Ministers (1981-1991), Dien Bien Phu Campaign (Commander, 1954)	
Võ Nguyên Hiến	1935-1936					
Võ Thành Trinh		1981-1987				
Võ Trần Chí			1991-1996			
Vĩnh Thụy					Resistance League Government (Supreme Advisor, March-Nov 1946)	
Võ Văn Kiệt			1976-1982 (alternative), 1982-Dec 1997		Ho Chi Minh City Party Committee (Secretary, 1976-1981), Council of Ministers (1982-1987; Acting Chairman, 1988; First Vice Chairman, 1987-1991; Chairman, 1991-1992), Prime Minister of Vietnam (1992-1996), Party Central Committee (Adviser, 1997-2001), Tet Offensive Campaign (South Wing Commander, 1968)	
Võ Văn Ngân	1935-1936, 1937-1940				Provisional Central Committee (1936-1937)	
Võ Văn Tần	1937-1940 (standing)					
Vũ Anh	1941-1951					
Vũ Đình Cự		1992-2002 (Vice Chairman)				
Vũ Đình Liệu					Council of Ministers (1982-1987)	
Vũ Đức Đam					Deputy Prime Minister (2013-2023)	
Vũ Hồng Khanh					Resistance League Government Resistance Committee (Vice Chairman, March-Nov 1946)	
Vũ Khoan				2001-2006	Deputy Prime Minister (2002-2006)	
Vũ Lăng					Spring On defensive (Commander of 3rd Corps, 1975)	
Vũ Oanh			1991-1996	1986-1991	Central Committee for People Campaigning (Chief, 1991-1996)	
Vũ Văn Ninh					Deputy Prime Minister (2011-2016)	
Vuong Thua Vu					Dien Bien Phu Campaign (Commander of the 308th Division, 1954)	
Xuân Thủy		1960-1963 (Vice Chairman), 1975-1981, 1981-1987 (Vice Chairman)		1968-1982	Minister of the Interior (1960-1964), Minister of Foreign Affairs (1964-1965), Council of State (1981-1982)	
Y Pah		1981-1987				

== See also ==
- Politics of Vietnam
- Central Committee of the Communist Party of Vietnam
- Politburo of the Communist Party of Vietnam
- General Secretary of the Communist Party of Vietnam
- Vietnamese Fatherland Front
- National Assembly of Vietnam
- Deputy Prime Minister of Vietnam
- List of prime ministers of Vietnam
- President of Vietnam
