= Lê Quang Đạo =

Vietnamese politician

- Official portrait, 1982

Chairman of the Central Committee of Vietnamese Fatherland Front
- In office 17 August 1994 – 24 July 1999
- Honorary Chairman: Nguyễn Hữu Thọ
- Preceded by: Nguyễn Hữu Thọ
- Succeeded by: Phạm Thế Duyệt

Chairman of the National Assembly of Vietnam
- In office 19 April 1987 – 19 July 1992
- Preceded by: Nguyễn Hữu Thọ
- Succeeded by: Nông Đức Mạnh

Deputy Chairman of the Council of State
- In office 19 April 1987 – 19 July 1992 Serving with List: Nguyễn Hữu Thọ; Huỳnh Tấn Phát; Nguyễn Quyết; Đàm Quang Trung; Nguyễn Thị Định
- Chairman: Võ Chí Công
- Succeeded by: Nguyễn Thị Bình

Personal details
- Born: 8 August 1921 Bắc Ninh Province, Indochina Northern Vietnam
- Died: 24 July 1999 (aged 77) Hanoi, Socialist Republic of Vietnam
- Party: Communist Party of Vietnam

Military service
- Allegiance: Vietnam
- Branch: People's Army
- Service years: 1948–1976
- Rank: Lieutenant General

Lê Quang Đạo (Vietnamese pronunciation: [le˧˧ kwaːŋ˧˧ ʔɗaːw˧˨ʔ]; 8 August 1921 – 24 July 1999) was a Vietnamese politician who was a member of the Central Committee of the Communist Party of Vietnam from 1960 to 1991. Having served 28 years in the military, he was promoted to the rank of Major General in 1959 and Lieutenant General in 1974. He was Chairman of the National Assembly and also one of the Vice Chairmen of the State Council of Vietnam from 1987 to 1992.

As a native of Đình Bảng village in Từ Sơn District, in the Red River Delta province of Bắc Ninh, he was instrumental in the government's restoration of the Đô Temple as a national memorial.
