= Committee in Defense of Peace and the Geneva Agreements =

Political organization in Vietnam

Committee in Defense of Peace and the Geneva Agreements was a political organization in Vietnam, formed in Saigon in August 1954 by Nguyễn Hữu Thọ. The Committee was crushed and banned by the South Vietnamese government in November the same year, and Nguyễn Hữu Thọ and other members of the organization were jailed after a police raid.

== See also ==
- Committee to Defend His Majesty's Neutrality Policy
