= Committee to Defend His Majesty's Neutrality Policy =

Committee to Defend His Majesty's Neutrality Policy was a leftwing political organization in Cambodia, formed in the mid-1950s by Son Phouc Tho (editor of Meatophum), Touch Phoeun, Hou Yuon and Saloth Chhay (the brother of Pol Pot). It's assumed that the Committee was modelled after its Vietnamese counterpart, the Committee in Defense of Peace and the Geneva Agreements. The group carried out legal activities. In 1956 the committee published Hou Yuon's doctoral thesis, The Co-operative Question, in Khmer language.
