= Đặng Thị Ngọc Thịnh =

Vietnamese politician

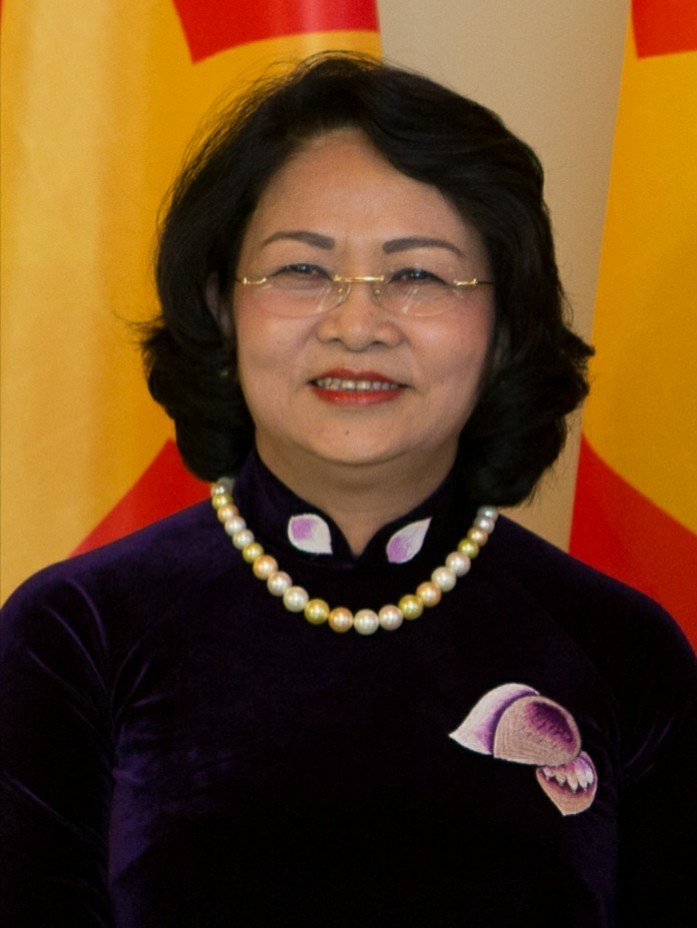
- Ngọc Thịnh in 2017

Acting President of Vietnam
- In office 21 September 2018 – 23 October 2018
- Prime Minister: Nguyễn Xuân Phúc
- Vice President: Herself
- Preceded by: Trần Đại Quang
- Succeeded by: Nguyễn Phú Trọng

16th Vice President of Vietnam
- In office 8 April 2016 – 6 April 2021
- President: Trần Đại Quang; Herself (acting); Nguyễn Phú Trọng
- Preceded by: Nguyễn Thị Doan
- Succeeded by: Võ Thị Ánh Xuân

Secretary of the Vĩnh Long Provincial Party Committee
- In office October 2010 – March 2015
- Preceded by: Trương Văn Sáu
- Succeeded by: Trần Văn Rón

Personal details
- Born: 25 December 1959 (age 66) Duy Trinh, Quảng Nam, South Vietnam (now Đà Nẵng, Vietnam)
- Party: Communist Party of Vietnam (1979–present)
- Spouse: Châu Hoàng Nhơn

Madam Đặng Thị Ngọc Thịnh (Vietnamese pronunciation: [ʔɗaŋ˧˨ʔ tʰi˧˨ʔ ŋawk͡p̚˧˨ʔ tʰïŋ˧˨ʔ]; born 25 December 1959) is a Vietnamese politician who served as the acting president of Vietnam in 2018 and as the 16th vice president of Vietnam from 2016 to 2021. She is the first woman in Vietnamese history to hold the Vietnamese presidency and the first female head of state in a communist country since Soong Ching-ling of China.

Thịnh was elected vice president of Vietnam on 8 April 2016 after winning 91.09% of the vote (450 votes) in the National Assembly, continuing the recent norm of having a woman holding this position. Thịnh assumed the acting presidency upon the death of President Trần Đại Quang on 21 September 2018 until the election and swearing-in of Nguyễn Phú Trọng on 23 October 2018.

Prior to national politics, Thịnh served in the municipal bureaucracy of Ho Chi Minh City before being elected Secretary of Vĩnh Long Provincial Party Committee (de facto province's leader) in 2010. She was a member of the 11th and 13th sessions of the National Assembly. Thịnh became a member of the Communist Party of Vietnam on 19 November 1979.

Her previous works focused on promoting gender equality and women's empowerment by strengthening their role in all aspects of economic, political, cultural and social life.

== See also ==
- List of elected and appointed female heads of state and government

Political offices
| Preceded by Nguyễn Thị Doan | Vice President of Vietnam; 2016–2021 | Succeeded by Võ Thị Ánh Xuân |
| Preceded by Trần Đại Quang | President of Vietnam; Acting; 2018 | Succeeded by Nguyễn Phú Trọng |
