= Vice President of Vietnam =

Deputy head of state of the Socialist Republic of Vietnam

Vice President of the Socialist Republic of Vietnam
- Phó Chủ tịch nước Cộng hòa xã hội chủ nghĩa Việt Nam
- Emblem of Vietnam

- Incumbent; Võ Thị Ánh Xuân since 6 April 2021
- Style: Madam Vice President (informal); Her Excellency (diplomatic)
- Seat: Hanoi
- Nominator: President
- Appointer: National Assembly
- Term length: No term limit
- Inaugural holder: Nguyễn Hải Thần
- Formation: 9 November 1946; 79 years ago

The vice president of the Socialist Republic of Vietnam (Vietnamese: Phó Chủ tịch nước Cộng hòa xã hội chủ nghĩa Việt Nam), known as the deputy chairman of the Council of State (Phó Chủ tịch Hội đồng Nhà nước) from 1981 to 1992, is the deputy head of state of the Socialist Republic of Vietnam. The vice president is appointed on the recommendation of the president to the National Assembly. The president can also recommend the vice president's dismissal and resignation from office. Upon the president's recommendation, the vice president has to be approved by the National Assembly. The main duty of a vice president is to help the president in discharging his duties—in certain cases, the vice president can be empowered by the president to replace him in the discharge of some of his duties. If the president cannot discharge his duties, the vice president becomes acting president (Tôn Đức Thắng, Nguyễn Hữu Thọ, Đặng Thị Ngọc Thịnh and Võ Thị Ánh Xuân were acting presidents for a short period). In case of vacancy, the vice president will remain acting president until the National Assembly elects a new president.

While the office of vice president was first mentioned in the 1946 constitution, Tôn Đức Thắng became the first vice president of Vietnam in 1960. The 1980 constitution renamed the office of vice president to Deputy Chairman of the Council of State. Unlike the 1946, 1959 and the present constitution, the 1980 constitution did not mention what kind of authority the office of vice president had—for instance, it was not mentioned if a vice president would take the responsibilities of acting head of state if the head of state was incapacitated. In 1992, the name for the post of deputy chairman of the Council of State was reverted to its original name; vice president. South Vietnam, under its 1967 constitution, also had a vice-president. Since 1992, the office of vice president has traditionally been occupied by a woman, with two of them becoming acting president in the 2020s.

== Vice presidents of the Democratic Republic of Vietnam (1960–1976) ==
No.	Portrait	Name	Took office	Left office	President
1		Nguyễn Hải Thần (1869–1959)	1945	1946	Hồ Chí Minh (1945–1969)
2		Tôn Đức Thắng (1888–1980)	1960	23 September 1969	Hồ Chí Minh (1945–1969)
3		Nguyễn Lương Bằng (1904–1979)	22 September 1969	2 July 1976	Tôn Đức Thắng (1969–1976)
4		Nguyễn Hữu Thọ (1910–1996)	25 April 1976	2 July 1976	Tôn Đức Thắng (1969–1976)

== Vice presidents of the Socialist Republic of Vietnam (1976–present) ==
=== Vice presidents (1976–1981) ===
No.	Portrait	Name	Took office	Left office	President
–		Nguyễn Lương Bằng (1904–1979)	2 July 1976	20 July 1979	Tôn Đức Thắng (1976–1980)
–		Nguyễn Hữu Thọ (1910–1996)	2 July 1976	4 July 1981	Nguyễn Hữu Thọ (1980–1981)

=== Deputy chairmen of the Council of State (1981–1992) ===
No.	Portrait	Name	Took office	Left office	Chairman of Council State
4		Nguyễn Hữu Thọ (1910–1996)	4 July 1981	19 July 1992	Trường Chinh (1981–1987); Võ Chí Công (1987–1992)
5		Chu Huy Mân (1913–2006)	4 July 1981	December 1986	Trường Chinh (1981–1987)
6		Xuân Thủy (1912–1985)	4 July 1981	July 1982	Trường Chinh (1981–1987)
7		Lê Thanh Nghị (1911–1989)	July 1982	December 1986	Trường Chinh (1981–1987)
8	—	Huỳnh Tấn Phát (1913–1989)	1982	1989	Trường Chinh (1981–1987)
8	—	Huỳnh Tấn Phát (1913–1989)	1982	1989	Võ Chí Công (1987–1992)
9	—	Nguyễn Quyết (1922–2024)	19 April 1987	19 July 1992	Võ Chí Công (1987–1992)
10	—	Đàm Quang Trung (1921–1995)	19 April 1987	19 July 1992	Võ Chí Công (1987–1992)
11	—	Lê Quang Đạo (1921–1999)	19 April 1987	19 July 1992	Võ Chí Công (1987–1992)
12	—	Major General Nguyễn Thị Định (1920–1992)	19 April 1987	19 July 1992	Võ Chí Công (1987–1992)

=== Vice presidents (1992–present) ===
No.	Portrait	Name	Took office	Left office	President
13		Nguyễn Thị Bình (born 1927)	8 October 1992	12 August 2002	Lê Đức Anh (1992–1997)
13		Nguyễn Thị Bình (born 1927)	8 October 1992	12 August 2002	Trần Đức Lương (1997–2006)
14		Trương Mỹ Hoa (born 1945)	12 August 2002	25 July 2007	Trần Đức Lương (1997–2006)
14		Trương Mỹ Hoa (born 1945)	12 August 2002	25 July 2007	Nguyễn Minh Triết (2006–2011)
15		Nguyễn Thị Doan (born 1951)	25 July 2007	8 April 2016	Nguyễn Minh Triết (2006–2011)
15		Nguyễn Thị Doan (born 1951)	25 July 2007	8 April 2016	Trương Tấn Sang (2011–2016)
16		Đặng Thị Ngọc Thịnh (born 1959)	8 April 2016	6 April 2021 (Note: Served as acting president from 21 September – 23 October 2018)	Trần Đại Quang (2016–2018)
16		Đặng Thị Ngọc Thịnh (born 1959)	8 April 2016	6 April 2021	Nguyễn Phú Trọng (2018–2021)
17		Võ Thị Ánh Xuân (born 1970)	6 April 2021	Incumbent (Note: Served as acting president from 18 January – 2 March 2023 and from 21 March – 22 May 2024)	Nguyễn Xuân Phúc (2021–2023)
17		Võ Thị Ánh Xuân (born 1970)	6 April 2021	Incumbent	Võ Văn Thưởng (2023–2024)
17		Võ Thị Ánh Xuân (born 1970)	6 April 2021	Incumbent	Tô Lâm (2024)
17		Võ Thị Ánh Xuân (born 1970)	6 April 2021	Incumbent	Lương Cường (2024–2026)
17		Võ Thị Ánh Xuân (born 1970)	6 April 2021	Incumbent	Tô Lâm (since 2026)
