= Huỳnh Tấn Phát =

Vietnamese revolutionary and politician (1913–1989)

Vice Chairman of the Council of State
- In office 28 June 1982 – 30 September 1989
- President: Trường Chinh; Võ Chí Công
- Preceded by: Nguyễn Lương Bằng

Deputy Prime Minister of Vietnam Minister of Construction
- In office 2 July 1976 – 16 June 1982
- Prime Minister: Phạm Văn Đồng

Chairman of government of South Vietnam (Provisional Revolutionary Government)
- In office 8 June 1969/30 April 1975 – 2 July 1976
- President: Nguyễn Hữu Thọ
- Preceded by: Vũ Văn Mẫu as Prime Minister of the Republic of Vietnam
- Succeeded by: Phạm Văn Đồng as Prime Minister of the Socialist Republic of Vietnam

Member of the Standing Committee of the National Assembly
- In office 6 January 1946 – 5 July 1960

Secretary General of National Liberation Front of South Vietnam
- In office 1962–1977

Personal details
- Born: 15 February 1913 An Hóa district, Mỹ Tho province, Cochinchina, French Indochina
- Died: 30 September 1989 (aged 76); Ho Chi Minh City, Vietnam
- Party: Communist Party of Vietnam , Democratic Party of Vietnam
- Education: Hanoi University
- Awards: Order of Ho Chi Minh

Huỳnh Tấn Phát (Vietnamese pronunciation: [hwïŋ̟˨˩ tən˧˦ faːt̚˧˦]; 15 February 1913 – 30 September 1989) was a Vietnamese architect, politician and revolutionary. He was the Prime Minister and de facto leader of the Provisional Revolutionary Government of South Vietnam during the Vietnam War. After unification, Phát became Deputy Prime Minister (Note: officially known as Deputy Chairman of the Council of Ministers) and Minister of Construction (Note: as Head of the State Commission for Basic Construction) before serving as Vice President of Vietnam (Note: officially known as Deputy Chairman of the Council of State) until his death. He is the designer of the flag of the National Liberation Front of South Vietnam.

== Early life and education ==
Huỳnh Tấn Phát born February 2, 1913 at Châu Hưng village, Hòa Quới canton, An Hóa district, Mỹ Tho province (later then known at Châu Hưng commune, Bình Đại district, Bến Tre province; now is Châu Hưng, Vĩnh Long province).

He studied architecture at the University of Hanoi. In 1940, he became the first Vietnamese architect to open a private architectural office in Saigon. In 1941, he won the first prize in the design contest of the Indochina Exhibition and Convention Center organized by the Governor General of Indochina Jean Decoux. He is the designer of the Hòa Bình Theater in Hòa Hưng and many iconic villas in District 1, Ho Chi Minh City.

Phát later became an editor of the anti-French magazine Jeunesse (Youth) and a co-founder of the Vanguard Youth movement.

== Career ==
Huỳnh Tấn Phát joined the Indochinese Communist Party in March 1945, and began revolutionary activities in Saigon, whereupon he was appointed Deputy Director of the Information and Press Committee for Southern Vietnam. He was a member of the First National Assembly of the Democratic Republic of Vietnam (North Vietnam).

When the French re-occupied Saigon after World War II, he was arrested and sentenced to two years in prison. Upon his release, Phát resumed his revolutionary activities and in 1949 was appointed a Commissioner of the Administrative Resistance Committee for Southern Vietnam and directly managed the Free Voice of Saigon-Cho Lon Radio.

He later emerged as a leading chief theoretician of the Viet Cong (formally the National Liberation Front). Phát became Chairman of the Provisional Revolutionary Government of the Republic of South Vietnam (PRG) on its formation in 1969. Upon the surrender of the Republic of Vietnam government on 30 April 1975, the PRG became the nominal government of South Vietnam. He held this post until 2 July 1976, when the country was reunified with the North, making him the only communist South Vietnamese prime minister. From 1976 to 1982, he was a vice premier of Vietnam. In 1982, he became the Vice President of the Council of State and served in this position until his death in 1989. Between 1983 and 1988, Phát was also the Chairman of the Vietnamese Fatherland Front, a political coalition that included the Communist Party of Vietnam, the Democratic Party of Vietnam and the Socialist Party of Vietnam.

== Legacy ==
For his devotion to the communist cause, he was awarded the Order of Ho Chi Minh. Huỳnh Tấn Phát died 1989 in Ho Chi Minh City at the age of 76. Many streets in Vietnamese cities and provinces have been named after him; in Ho Chi Minh City, the Provincial Road 15, run through the former Nhà Bè district (before 1997) from Tân Thuận Bridge to Bình Khánh ferry has changed after his name shortly after his death.
