= Nguyễn Hữu Thọ =

Vietnamese politician (1910–1996)

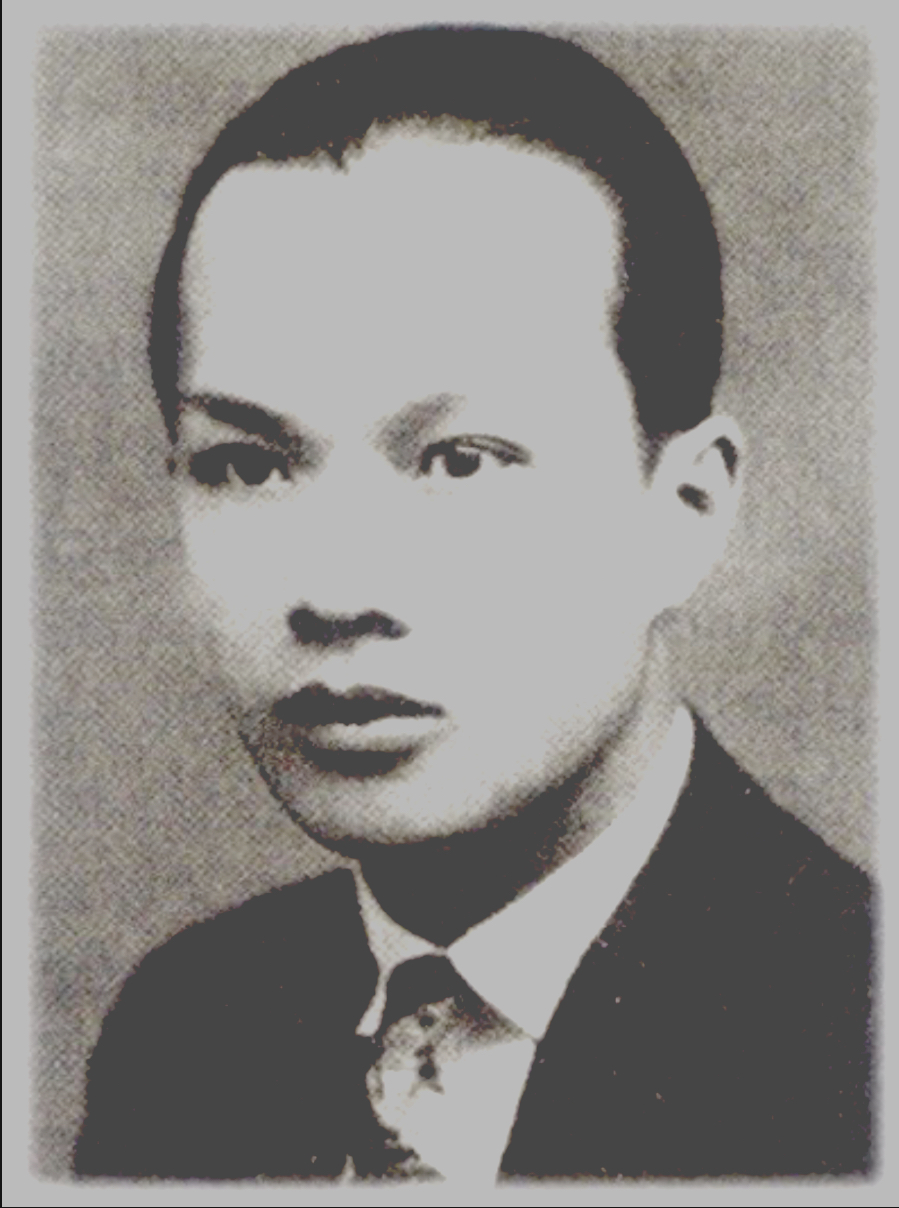
- Nguyễn Hữu Thọ in 1932

Acting President of Vietnam
- In office 30 March 1980 – 4 July 1981
- Preceded by: Tôn Đức Thắng
- Succeeded by: Trường Chinh (as Chairman of the Council of State)

Chairman of Consultative Council of the Provisional Revolutionary Government of the Republic of South Vietnam
- In office 8 June 1969 – 2 July 1976
- Preceded by: Position established
- Succeeded by: Tôn Đức Thắng (as President of the Socialist Republic of Vietnam)

Chairman of the National Assembly of Vietnam
- In office 26 April 1981 – 19 April 1987
- Preceded by: Trường Chinh
- Succeeded by: Lê Quang Đạo

Vice President of Vietnam
- In office 2 July 1976 – 19 July 1992
- Preceded by: Nguyễn Lương Bằng (as Vice President of North Vietnam)
- Succeeded by: Nguyễn Thị Bình

Chairman of Central Committee Presidium National Liberation Front of South Vietnam
- In office 16 February 1962 – 31 January 1977
- Deputy: Huỳnh Tấn Phát
- Succeeded by: Position established

Personal details
- Born: 10 July 1910 Bến Lức District, Cochinchina, French Indochina
- Died: 24 December 1996 (aged 86) Ho Chi Minh City, Vietnam
- Party: Communist Party of Vietnam (1949–1994)
- Awards: Gold Star Order; Lenin Peace Prize

Nguyễn Hữu Thọ (Vietnamese: [ŋwiən˦ˀ˥ hiw˦ˀ˥ tʰɔ˧˨ʔ]; 10 July 1910 – 24 December 1996) was a South Vietnamese politician, revolutionary and Chairman of Provisional Revolutionary Government of the Republic of South Vietnam from 6 June 1969 to 2 July 1976, and the Chairman of the National Assembly of Vietnam from 4 July 1981 to 18 June 1987.

Nguyễn Hữu Thọ began his political career in 1949, when he led protests against French colonial rule of Indochina and the patrols of US naval warships off the coast of southern Vietnam. As a consequence of these activities, he was arrested and imprisoned from 1950 to 1952. He went on an extended hunger strike while imprisoned which enhanced his reputation. After the partition of Vietnam into the Soviet-backed communist North Vietnam and the US-backed South Vietnam in 1954, he remained in the south and subsequently co-operated with the government of President Ngô Đình Diệm until he was arrested again for creating an organisation intended on achieving reunification through the proposed elections scheduled for 1956 by 1954 accords.

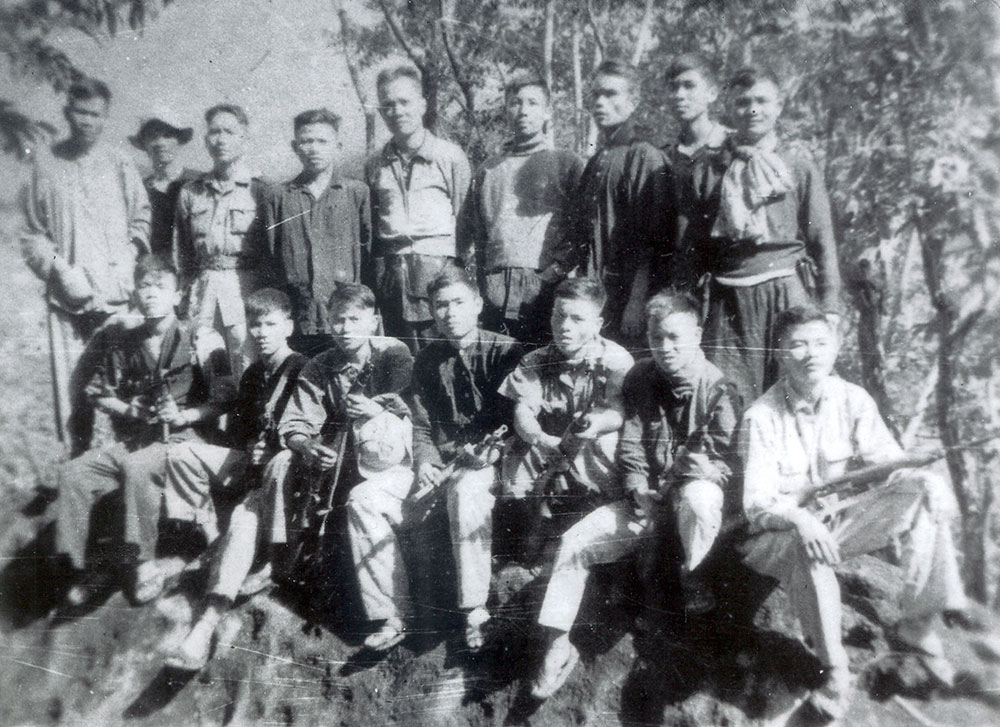
Nguyễn Hữu Thọ and the Phú Yên Province guerrillas prior to the formation of the Viet Cong.

In 1961, he escaped from prison and became first interim president and then chairman of the North Vietnamese backed National Front for the Liberation of South Vietnam (Viet Cong), which was co-founded by him on December 20, 1960. This group launched an armed insurgency against the government of South Vietnam during the Vietnam War. In June 1969, North Vietnam founded the Provisional Revolutionary Government of South Vietnam, in which Huỳnh Tấn Phát became President and he himself became Chairman of the Consultative Council. After the North Vietnamese conquest all of South Vietnam following the fall of Saigon in April 1975, he became Prime Minister of new-found Republic of South Vietnam.

After the official reunification of Vietnam and the founding of the Socialist Republic of Vietnam on 2 July 1976, he became one of two vice-presidents and thus a deputy of then President Tôn Đức Thắng. At the same time, he was also the first mayor of Ho Chi Minh City (Saigon, named after dead Ho). After Tôn Đức Thắng's death on 30 March 1980, he became acting President of Vietnam, a post he held until he was replaced by Trường Chinh on 4 July 1981.

He then served as Deputy Chairman of the Council of State from 1981 to 1992. From 1981 to 1987 he was also Chairman of the National Assembly (Quốc hội Việt Nam) and thus President of the Parliament. Between 1988 and 1994, he was chairman of the Vietnamese Fatherland Front (Mặt trận Tổ quốc Việt Nam), the umbrella organization for mass organizations in the country.

== Life and career ==
A French-educated lawyer in Cochinchina, Thọ was also a member of the French Section of the Workers' International (SFIO) and a participant in the Vietnamese fight for independence. He joined the Vietnamese National Popular League (or Liên Việt) in 1948, Communist Party in 1949, and was kept in detention from 1950–52. He later came to support the 1954 Geneva agreements, but opposed the government of South Vietnam's president, Ngô Đình Diệm. In August 1954, he founded the Committee in Defense of Peace and the Geneva Agreements. The committee was crushed and banned by the South Vietnamese government in November the same year, and Thọ and other members of the organization were jailed after a police raid.

He remained in detention until 1961, when he managed to escape. Free, Thọ became Chairman of the Central Committee of the National Liberation Front. In 1965, he delivered an anti-imperialist speech, a booklet was later published in English, entitled SPEECH. His title was given as: President of the Presidium of the Consultative Council of the South Viet Nam [sic] National Front for Liberation on the 5th founding anniversary of the N.F.L. In 1969, he became Chairman of the Consultative Council of the Provisional Revolutionary Government of the Republic of South Vietnam, a post he retained until South Vietnam was incorporated into North Vietnam in 1976.

In the newly re-unified Vietnam, he served as one of the vice presidents until the death of Tôn Đức Thắng, when he was named acting president (April 1980 – July 1981), a post he held until the appointment of Trường Chinh, Chairman of the Standing Committee of the National Assembly, in July 1981. On relinquishing the post of president, he assumed the role of Chairman of the National Assembly until 1987. He was vice-chairman of the council of state 1981–92. Thọ was awarded the Lenin Peace Prize (1983–84).

Nguyen died on 24 December 1996 at Ho Chi Minh City at the age of 86.

Political offices
Preceded by Dương Văn Minh as President of the Republic of Vietnam	President of South Vietnam; 1975–1976	Succeeded by Tôn Đức Thắng as President of the Socialist Republic of Vietnam
Preceded by Nguyễn Lương Bằng	Vice President of Vietnam; 1976–1992	Succeeded by Nguyễn Thị Bình
