= Nguyễn Thị Định =

General of Vietnam People's Army

Her Excellency Major General Nguyễn Thị Định

Vice President of Vietnam
- In office 19 April 1987 – 19 July 1992
- Preceded by: Lê Quang Đạo
- Succeeded by: Nguyễn Thị Bình

Personal details
- Born: 15 March 1920 Giồng Trôm district, Bến Tre province, French Indochina
- Died: 26 August 1992 (aged 72) Ho Chi Minh City, Vietnam
- Party: Communist Party of Vietnam

Military service
- Allegiance: Provisional Revolutionary Government of the Republic of South Vietnam (North Vietnam) Vietnam
- Branch/service: People's Liberation Armed Forces of South Vietnam
- Years of service: 1965–1975
- Rank: Major General
- Commands: Deputy Commander of the People's Liberation Armed Forces of South Vietnam

Nguyễn Thị Định (Vietnamese pronunciation: [ŋwiən˦ˀ˥ tʰi˧˨ʔ ʔɗïŋ˧˨ʔ]; 15 March 1920 – 26 August 1992) was a Vietnamese revolutionary, military officer and politician. She was one of the leaders of the 1960 Đồng Khởi uprising in Bến Tre province, and from 1965 she was deputy commander of the People's Liberation Armed Forces of South Vietnam. The women's movement that grew out of the uprising became known as the "Long-Haired Army". In 1974, she became the first woman to hold the rank of general in the Vietnam People's Army.

After the reunification of Vietnam, she chaired the Vietnam Women's Union, and from 1987 until her death she was a vice chairwoman of the Council of State. She was posthumously named a Hero of the People's Armed Forces in 1995.

== Early life and family ==
Nguyễn Thị Định was born on 15 March 1920 in Lương Hòa commune, Giồng Trôm district, in Bến Tre province. She was the youngest of ten children in a poor peasant family. She joined the revolutionary movement at the age of 16, taking part in the Indochinese Congress movement of 1936. In October 1938, she was admitted to the Indochinese Communist Party.

She married Nguyễn Văn Bích, a member of the Bến Tre provincial party committee. He was arrested on 4 October 1939, three days after the birth of their son. The French authorities exiled him to Côn Đảo in 1940, and he died there. Their son, Nguyễn Ngọc Minh, was later regrouped to the North, and he died without being reunited with his mother.

About half a year after her husband's exile, Định was herself arrested and exiled to Bà Rá. She later said that her time at Bà Rá had been like attending a formal course of Marxist training. Because of a severe heart condition, she was allowed to return home in 1943, where she was kept under the surveillance of the local authorities. In a 1987 interview with The Christian Science Monitor, she said that her three years in prison had given her a good reputation.

== First Indochina War ==
In August 1945, Định took part in the uprising that seized power in Bến Tre during the August Revolution. In March 1946, on the orders of the party committees of Military Zone 8 and Bến Tre province, she sailed north with a delegation to report on the situation in the South and to ask the party leadership for weapons. During the trip, she met Ho Chi Minh. In November 1946, she led the boat that brought 12 tonnes of weapons safely back to the South. She was elected to the Bến Tre provincial party committee in 1947.

== Đồng Khởi uprising ==
Định became deputy secretary of the Bến Tre provincial party committee in 1959. On the night of 1 January 1960, she gathered the province's party leaders, who resolved to launch an uprising on 17 January. She gave the uprising the name Đồng Khởi ("Concerted Uprising") and directed its first wave. It broke out on 17 January 1960 in the communes of Định Thủy, Phước Hiệp and Bình Khánh in Mỏ Cày district, and spread across the province. Phước Hiệp was fully in the insurgents' hands by the next day. In a 1981 interview, Định recalled that at Định Thủy the insurgents had captured thirty guns in three hours without having any guns of their own.

Women played a central role in the movement. When government forces mounted operations against the insurgents, Định sent about 5,000 women to protest at the Mỏ Cày market, and the protest lasted 12 days. According to Định, government soldiers began calling the protesters the "Long-Haired Army", and Ho Chi Minh later adopted the name for them. Its members held political demonstrations, persuaded government soldiers to desert and took part in armed attacks. Many women were drawn to the National Liberation Front (NLF) by its promise to change the role of women in society.

== Vietnam War ==
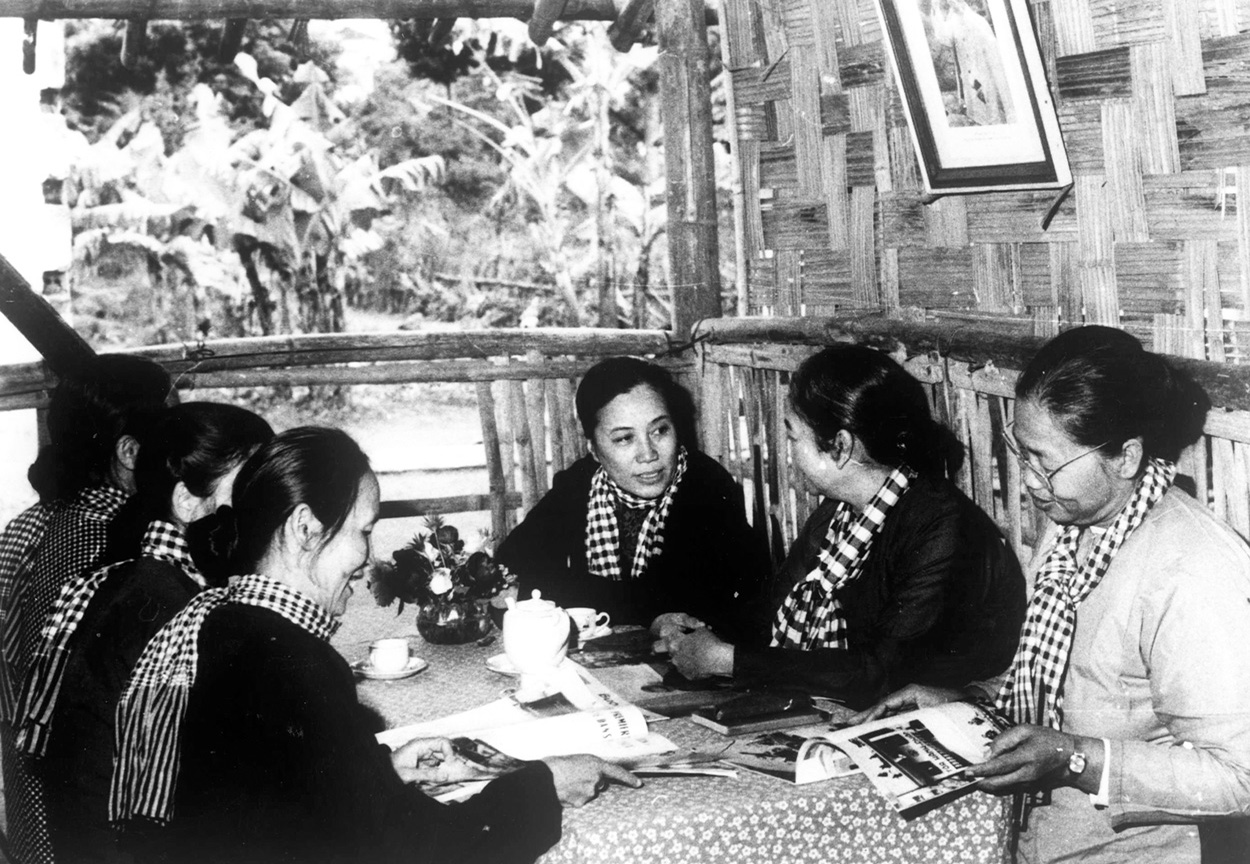
Định (right, second from left) with Nguyễn Thị Bình alongside other "Long-Haired Army" leaders.

After the uprising, Định became secretary of the Bến Tre provincial party committee and chairwoman of the province's Liberation Front. She was a founding member of the NLF, and in 1964 she was elected to the presidium of its central committee at its first congress. In 1965, she was appointed deputy commander of the People's Liberation Armed Forces of South Vietnam and chairwoman of the South Vietnam Women's Liberation Association. According to The Christian Science Monitor, she also helped to lead the Tet Offensive of 1968. The New York Times described her as the most senior woman in the Viet Cong, and wrote that the Long-Haired Army under her command carried out espionage and fought against South Vietnamese and American forces.

In April 1974, Định was promoted to major general, which made her the first woman general of the Vietnam People's Army.

== Later career ==
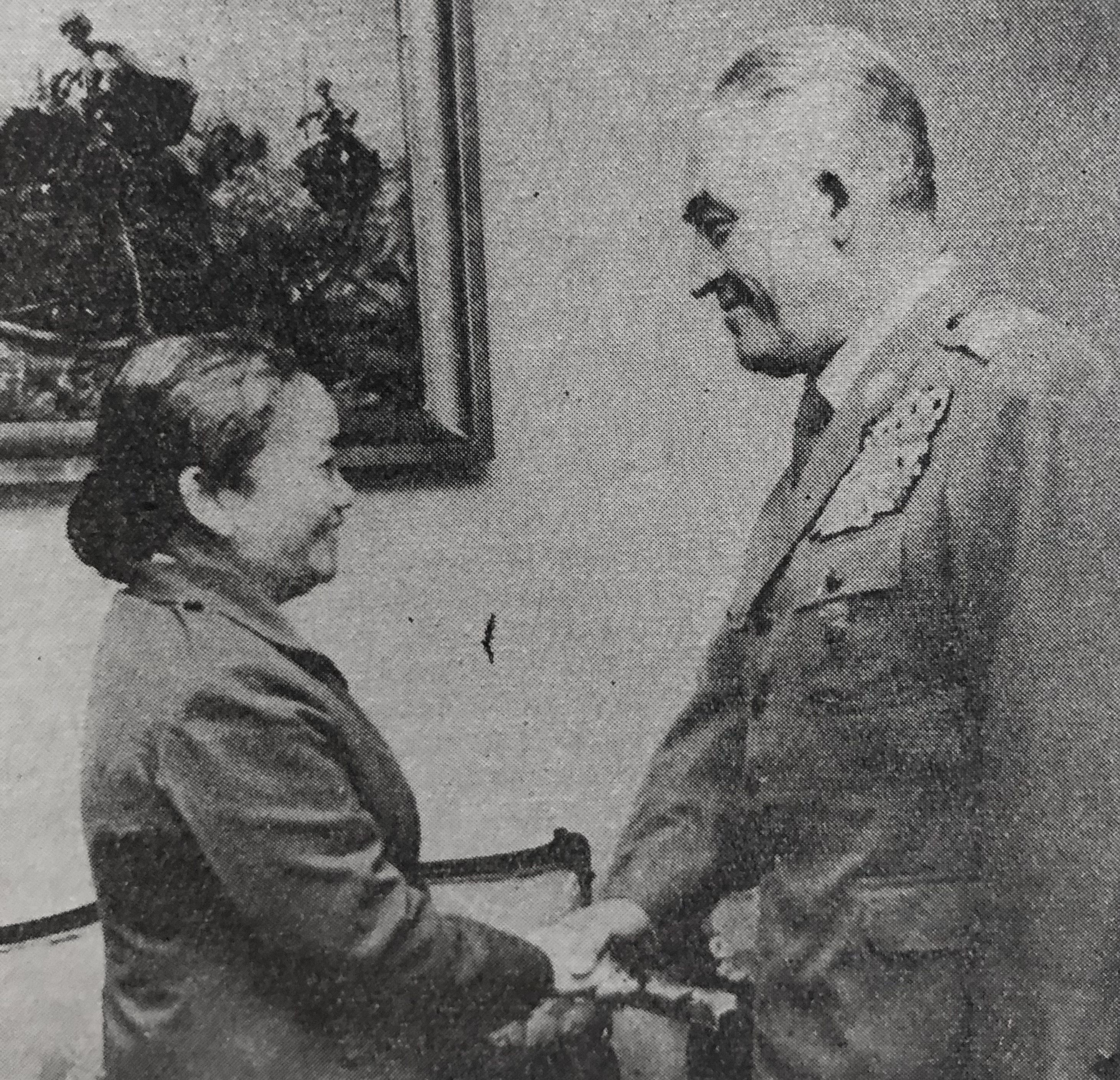
Định meeting Deputy Minister of Defense of Poland Józef Urbanowicz (1976)

After the war, Định served as deputy minister of war invalids and social affairs. She was a member of the Central Committee of the Communist Party of Vietnam in its 4th, 5th and 6th terms, and a deputy to the 6th, 7th and 8th National Assemblies. In 1982, she became chairwoman of the Vietnam Women's Union. She was also a vice chairwoman of the Women's International Democratic Federation and chairwoman of the Vietnam–Cuba Friendship Association. She contributed to the founding of the Vietnamese Women's Museum in Hanoi.

In 1987, Định became one of the vice chairmen of the Council of State. In her 1987 interview with The Christian Science Monitor, she said that Vietnamese women were "liberated officially, but they are not fully free". She named a weak economy and lingering feudal attitudes as obstacles to their advancement.

Định died in office in Ho Chi Minh City on 26 August 1992, at the age of 72. She was buried in Ho Chi Minh City.

== Memoir and writings ==
Định's memoir was translated into English by Mai V. Elliott and published by the Southeast Asia Program of Cornell University in 1976 as No Other Road to Take. In 1981, she was interviewed for the documentary series Vietnam: A Television History. She contributed the piece "The braided army" to the 1984 anthology Sisterhood Is Global: The International Women's Movement Anthology, edited by Robin Morgan.

== Legacy ==
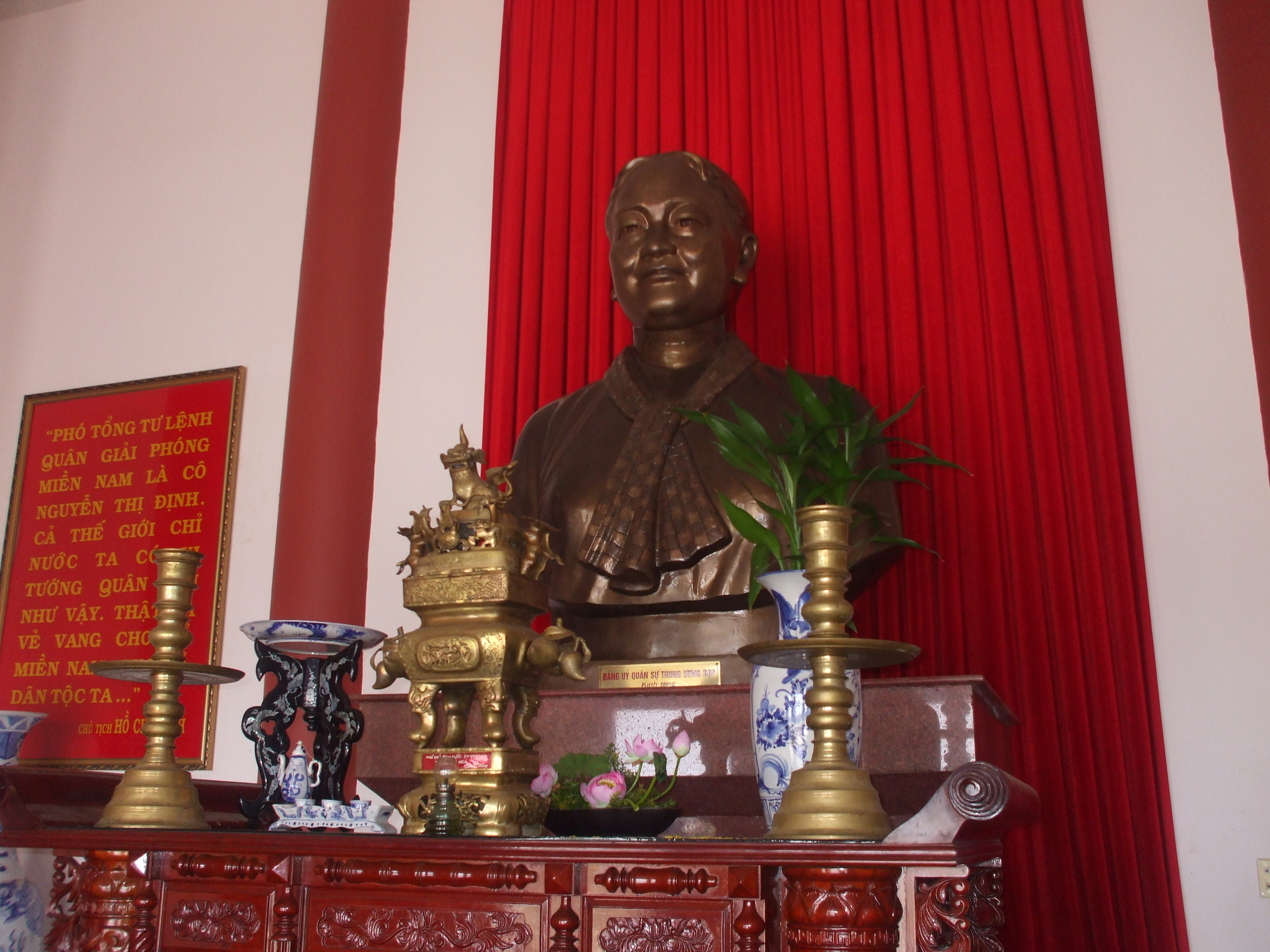
Statue of Nguyễn Thị Định

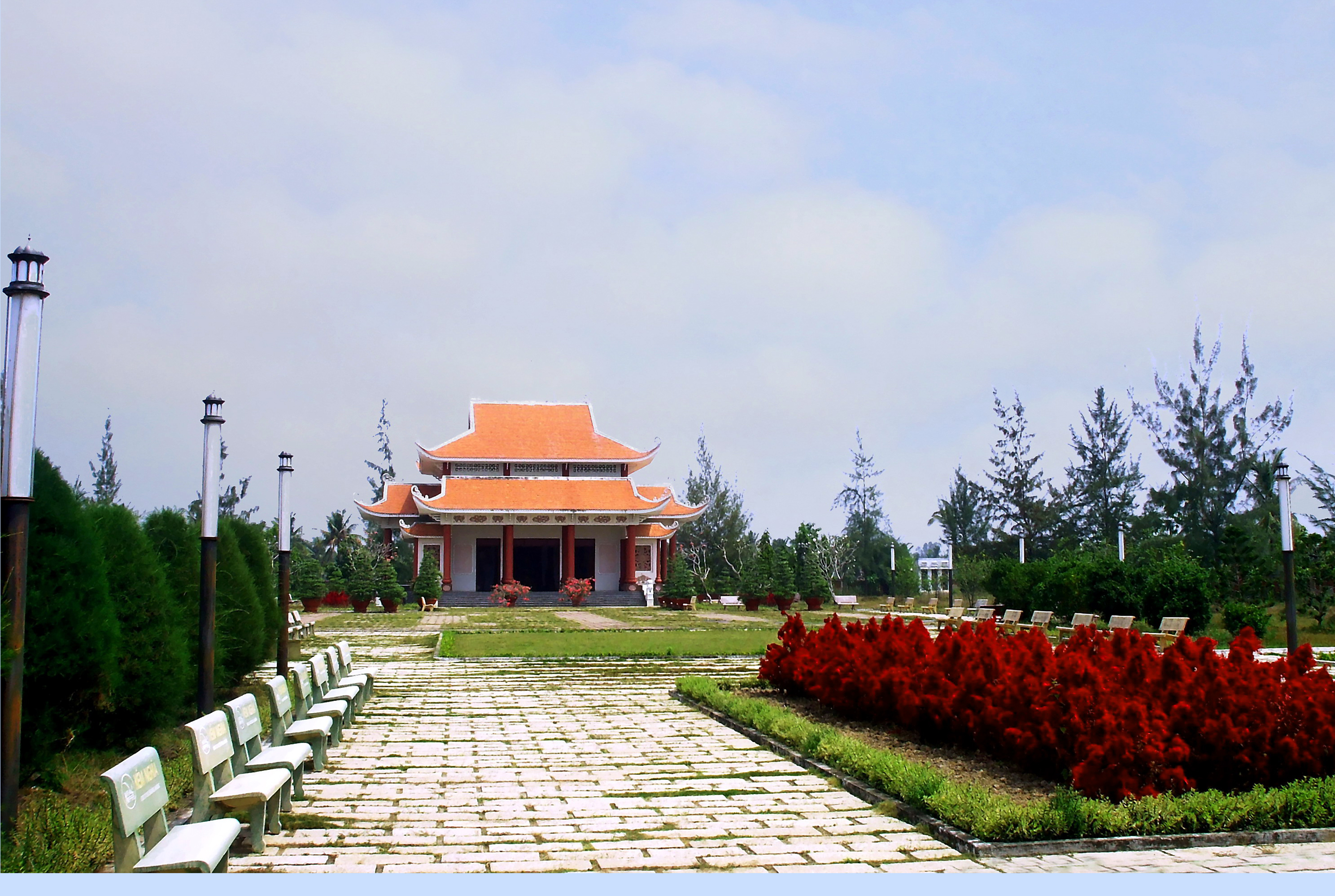
Memorial temple to Nguyễn Thị Định

A memorial site dedicated to her opened in Lương Hòa on 20 December 2003, and it was upgraded in 2024 and 2025. On 12 December 2024, the Bến Tre Provincial People's Committee recognised her birthplace and childhood home as a provincial historical and cultural relic. Schools and streets across Vietnam are named after her, and a scholarship in her name has been awarded in Bến Tre since 1996. The Vietnam Women's Union established the Nguyễn Thị Định Prize for its most outstanding full-time cadres, and it was first awarded to 30 recipients on 8 October 2024. A village in Cuba is also named after her.

In 2023, a portrait of Định made from lotus leaves was presented to the Vietnamese Women's Museum. The historian Trần Văn Giàu said that people like her "live as generals and become gods in death". On 15 March 2025, the 105th anniversary of her birth, the party's Central Propaganda and Mass Mobilisation Commission and the Bến Tre provincial party committee held a conference on her life and career. At the conference, Lê Văn Lợi, deputy director of the Ho Chi Minh National Academy of Politics, described her as a general of strategic talent and a respected leader.

== Honours ==
=== Domestic ===
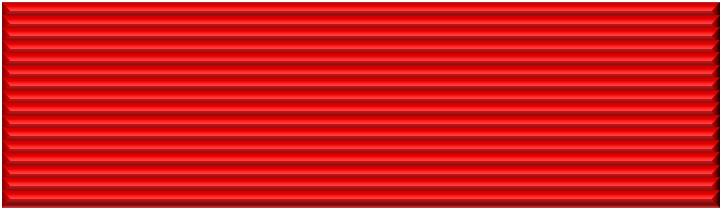
- Hero of the People's Armed Forces (posthumous, 30 August 1995)
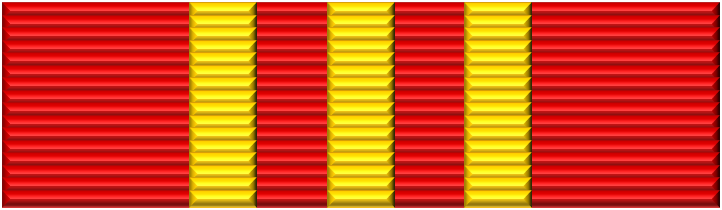
- Ho Chi Minh Order (twice)
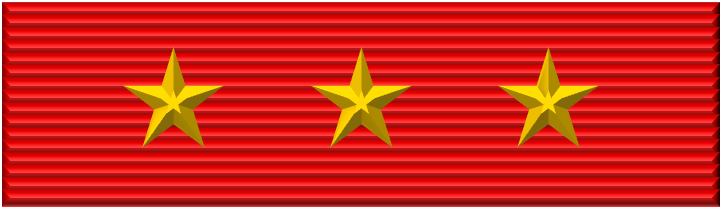
- Military Exploit Order, First Class
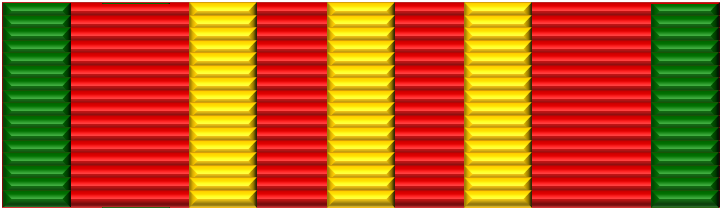
- Resolution for Victory Order, First Class
- Anti-American Resistance Order, First Class
- 50-year Party Membership Badge

=== Foreign ===
- Order of Playa Girón (Cuba)
- Freedom Order, First Class (Laos)
- Lenin Peace Prize (Soviet Union, 1968)
- Order of Friendship of Peoples (Soviet Union)

Political offices
Preceded by Lê Thanh Nghị Chu Huy Mân	Vice President of Vietnam; 1987–1992	Succeeded by Nguyễn Thị Bình
