= Trương Mỹ Hoa =

Vietnamese politician

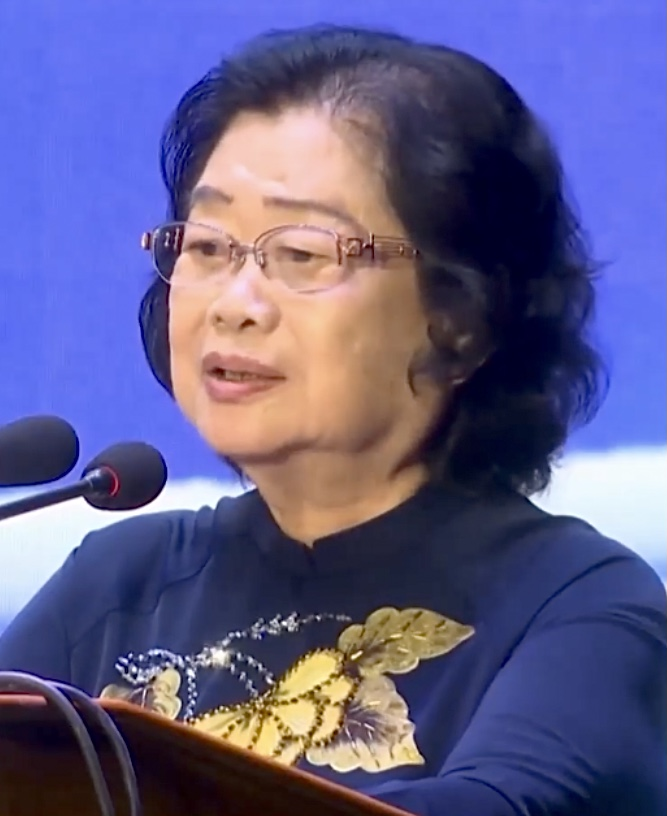
- Mỹ Hoa in 2023

Vice President of Vietnam
- In office 12 August 2002 – 25 July 2007
- President: Trần Đức Lương; Nguyễn Minh Triết
- Preceded by: Nguyễn Thị Bình
- Succeeded by: Nguyễn Thị Doan

Vice Chairman of the National Assembly of Vietnam
- In office 1994–2002

Communist Party Secretary of Tân Bình
- In office 1986–1991

Personal details
- Born: 8 May 1945 (age 81)
- Party: Communist Party of Vietnam

Trương Mỹ Hoa (Vietnamese pronunciation: [t͡ɕɨəŋ˧˧ mi˦ˀ˥ hwaː˧˧], common name Bảy Thư; born 8 May 1945) is a Vietnamese politician from Tiền Giang Province and a member of the Communist Party of Vietnam since 1963. She was vice president from 2002 to 2007 after holding various party and government positions in Hanoi and Ho Chi Minh City and being involved in the Vietnam War.

Hoa was party secretary and People's Committee chairman of Tân Bình district of Ho Chi Minh City from 1986 to 1991 before continuing her career at the centre. She has held positions as a member of the executive board of the Central Party Committee, a member of the Congress Party delegation, the vice chairman of the Vietnam National Assembly from 1994 to 2002, and the vice president from 2002 to 2007.

Hoa has been married since 1975 and has two daughters.

Political offices
Preceded by Nguyen Thi Binh	Vice President of Vietnam; 2002–2007	Succeeded by Nguyen Thi Doan
