= Tôn Đức Thắng =

Vietnamese politician (1888–1980)

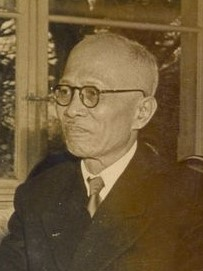
- Tôn Đức Thắng in 1956

President of Vietnam
- In office 2 July 1976 – 30 March 1980
- Preceded by: Himself (as President of North Vietnam)
- Succeeded by: Nguyễn Hữu Thọ (acting); Trường Chinh (as Chairman of the Council of State)

President of North Vietnam
- In office 2 September 1969 – 2 July 1976
- Preceded by: Hồ Chí Minh
- Succeeded by: Himself (as President of reunified Vietnam)

Vice President of North Vietnam
- In office July 15, 1960 – September 2, 1969
- President: Ho Chi Minh
- Preceded by: Nguyễn Hải Thần; Võ Nguyên Giáp
- Succeeded by: Nguyễn Lương Bằng

Chairman of the National Assembly
- In office 20 September 1955 – 15 July 1960
- Preceded by: Bùi Bằng Đoàn
- Succeeded by: Trường Chinh

President of Liên Việt Front (First Indochina War)
- In office 3 March 1951 – 10 September 1955

Personal details
- Born: 20 August 1888 Long Xuyên, An Giang, Cochinchina, French Indochina
- Died: 30 March 1980 (aged 91) Hanoi, Vietnam
- Party: Communist Party of Vietnam
- Spouse: Đoàn Thị Giàu
- Awards: Gold Star Order

Tôn Đức Thắng (Vietnamese: [ton˧˧ ʔɗɨk̚˧˦ tʰaŋ˧˦]; 20 August 1888 – 30 March 1980) was the second President of Vietnam under the leadership of Communist Party General Secretary Lê Duẩn. The position of president is ceremonial and Tôn was never a major policymaker or even a member of the Politburo, Vietnam's ruling council. He served as president, initially of Democratic Republic of Vietnam from September 2, 1969, and later of a united Vietnam, until his death in 1980.

Known in Vietnam as Uncle Tôn (Bác Tôn), Tôn Đức Thắng was a Vietnamese revolutionary and communist political figure. He was chairman of the National Assembly's Standing Committee (1955–1960) and served as the Vice President to Hồ Chí Minh from 1960 to 1969, succeeding him as president after Ho's death. He died at the age of 91; he was the oldest head of a state with the title of "president" (subsequently surpassed by Hastings Banda).

== Early life ==
Tôn Đức Thắng was born to Tôn Văn Đề and Nguyễn Thị Di on Ông Hổ Island along the Mekong River, roughly four kilometres from Long Xuyên, the capital of An Giang Province. From 1897 to 1901, Tôn received his education in Nôm script, history and Confucian philosophy from a private tutor in Long Xuyên. This tutor, an anti-colonialist, had a major influence on the early development of Tôn's political beliefs. Afterwards, he learned French at an elementary school in Long Xuyên. Tôn lived with his parents until 1906, when he moved to Saigon.

== Revolutionary career ==
Tôn claimed to have participated while a sailor in the French navy, during his time in the Black Sea in 1919, during the Black Sea mutiny a plot with fellow sailors to turn over the French armored cruiser Waldeck-Rousseau to the enemy Bolshevik revolutionaries. Christoph Giebel, an author, claims that Tôn apparently did not participate in a mutiny on a French ship sent to the Black Sea in 1919 to help defeat Bolsheviks. He claims that it was a fabricated story that linked Vietnamese communism with the October Revolution in Russia, which was recounted across the Communist world in the 1950s. Giebel also highlights disagreements over Tôn's involvement with a Saigon labour union in the 1920s and the naval-yard strike there in 1925, though the credibility of the story is unknown.

Tôn Đức Thắng continued to participate in rebellious activities against the French. He joined the Vietnamese Revolutionary Youth League in 1927 and in 1929, he was imprisoned by the French colonial authority at Saigon, then deported to the famed Côn Sơn Prison. He remained there until 1945 and immediately rose again in the public eye. After Hồ Chí Minh's Viet Minh came to power in August 1945, Tôn became a member of the Cochinchina Party Committee of the CPV, a member of the Administration Resistance Committee of Cochinchina and, in 1946, the presiding member of the National Assembly. In 1947, he became a member of the Central Committee of the Communist Party of Vietnam.

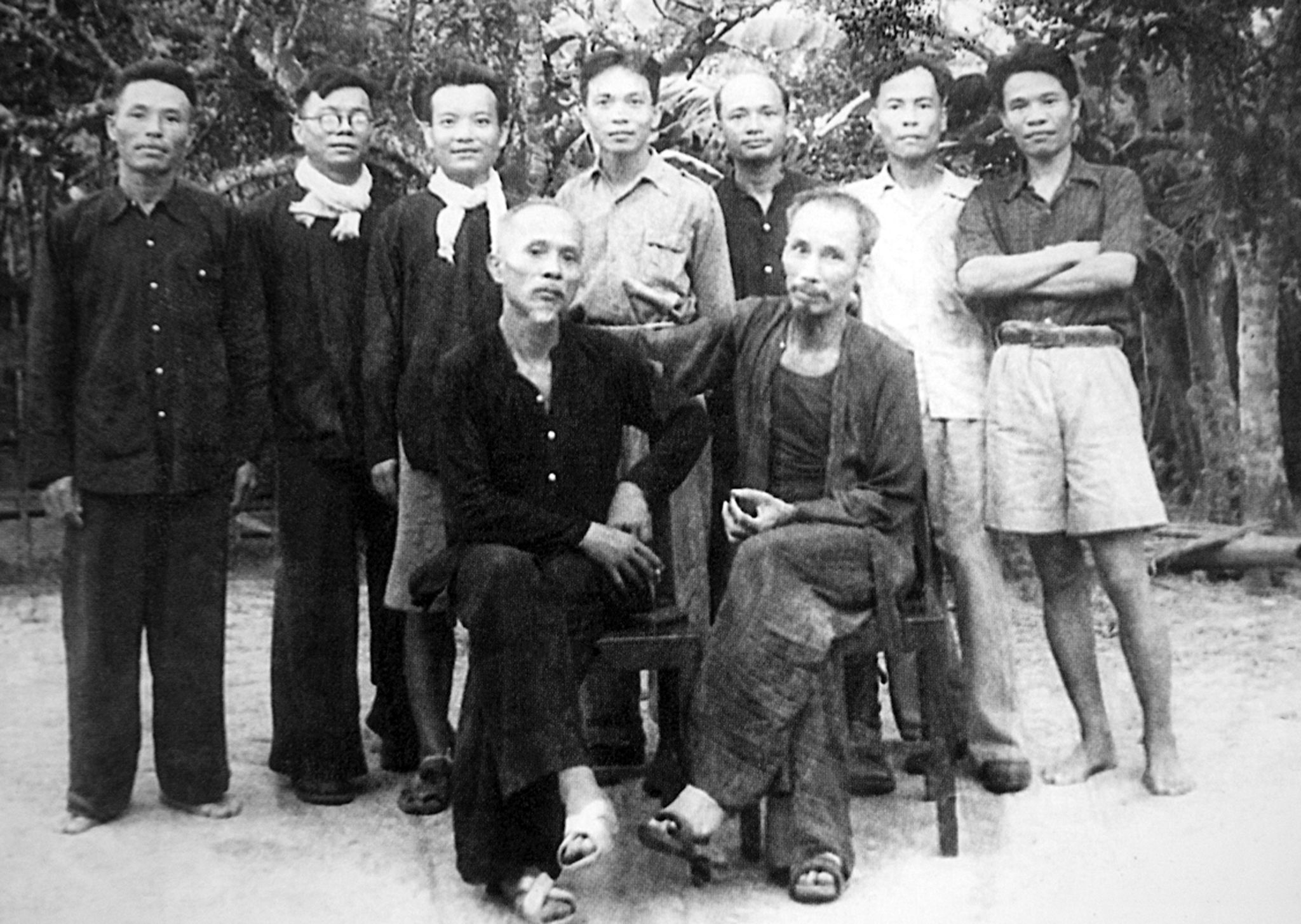
Hồ Chí Minh (seated, r) with Tôn Đức Thắng (seated, l) and other senior members of the Viet Minh, liberated zone, northern Vietnam, 1948.

== Career in the DRV ==
=== Rise to power ===
Tôn also served as president of the Lien Viet during the rebellion against the French from 1946 to 1954. However, the organization was dissolved after the Geneva Convention in 1954 which gave the Viet Minh sole control over the DRV. Tôn then took over another organization, the Vietnamese Fatherland Front, a pro-government nationalist group. Tôn led the Fatherland Front in its campaign to draw supporters from South Vietnam. He received the Stalin Peace Award in 1955 as a result.

Tôn's work trying to win over South Vietnam by peaceful means also helped lead him to becoming the Vice President under Hồ Chí Minh in 1960. In 1967, when he was still vice president, Tôn won the Lenin Peace Prize, an annual prize similar to the Nobel Peace Prize, but given out by the Soviet Union. After Hồ Chí Minh's death in 1969, Tôn succeeded him as president. Most of the real power, however, was vested in Communist Party chief Lê Duẩn.

=== Fall of Saigon ===
With the fall of Saigon on 30 April 1975, the Provisional Revolutionary Government took control of the South. This allowed for the future reunification of Vietnam as the Socialist Republic of Vietnam, which was formalized on 2 July 1976. Presently, April 30 is recognized as a public holiday in Vietnam known as Reunification Day, even though it was not until July 2 the year after that the two countries became officially united as one nation. Tôn became the first president of the reunified country.

== President of reunified Vietnam ==
With the end of the Vietnam War and with the South Vietnamese government ousted, Tôn was easily able to hold on to his position as president of the unstable new nation during the middle and late 1970s. The unified Vietnam under Tôn experienced early troubles, as political and economic conditions were deteriorating and millions of South Vietnamese were fleeing the country as boat people. As the leader of the united Socialist Republic of Vietnam, Tôn worked hard for several years on a massive reconstruction effort to rebuild both the former North and South Vietnam's industry, infrastructure, and economy.

=== Deposing of the Khmer Rouge ===
In early 1978 Tôn approached the Soviet Union for help in deposing the Khmer Rouge in Cambodia, which was aligned with the People's Republic of China (PRC). Growing tensions between the PRC and the Soviet Union had drastically escalated the situation in the area, making the Soviet Union anxious about the outcome of a proxy war between Vietnam and Cambodia.

Tôn's proposal may have seemed like a golden opportunity for the Soviet Union because it assumed that the Vietnamese army could easily defeat Cambodian forces. A Vietnamese victory would weaken the only nation aligned with the People's Republic of China in Southeast Asia and demonstrate the superiority of being aligned with the Soviet Union.

On 25 December 1978, after months of growing border incursions by the Khmer Rouge into Vietnam, the killings of innocent Vietnamese civilians such as the Ba Chúc massacre and an influx of Cambodians seeking refuge in Vietnam, the People's Army of Vietnam invaded Cambodia. By 7 January 1979, the Vietnamese had easily captured the capital of Cambodia, Phnom Penh, and deposed the Khmer Rouge régime. However, the Soviet Union's diplomatic victory was short-lived, as the PRC was now being backed by the United States, and they increasingly showed signs of being close to war with Vietnam. The Soviets knew that they could not intervene to help the Vietnamese if the PRC decided to invade Vietnam.

On 15 February 1979, the People's Republic of China officially announced plans to invade Vietnam, thus ending the crucial and significant Sino-Soviet Treaty of Friendship, which had been signed in 1950. The PRC claimed that the invasion was the result of Vietnam's mistreatment of ethnic Chinese and the Vietnamese presence on the PRC's Spratly Islands.

On 17 February, a PRC force of about 200,000 troops had crossed into Vietnam, and they immediately started to invade Vietnamese cities and towns along Vietnam's northern border. Vietnam had left an army of 100,000 men to fight off the PRC and heavy casualties were reported from both sides.

The Chinese started to withdraw their forces less than a month later, on March 16. China's early exit from the country led to much confusion to who was the victor of the Sino-Vietnamese War, or if there was one. Tôn proclaimed that Vietnam had won the war, while his counterpart in China, Ye Jianying, proclaimed a Chinese victory. However, one thing is sure about the Sino-Vietnamese War's outcome: Tôn's Vietnam was able to successfully depose the Khmer Rouge from power in Cambodia.

== Death and legacy ==
Tôn Đức Thắng died on 30 March 1980, in Hanoi, a little more than a year after the conclusion of the Sino-Vietnamese War, at the age of 91 from a heart seizure and respiratory failure. He was the oldest ever president of a country in the world. He was succeeded by one of his vice presidents, Nguyễn Hữu Thọ. He is buried in Mai Dịch Cemetery in the section reserved for the graves of government leaders and famous revolutionaries.

Even though Tôn had been the first president of the reunited Socialist Republic of Vietnam, he has not attained the same reverence as his predecessor, Hồ Chí Minh, had received from the Vietnamese people. Tôn served as the nation's leader during the pivotal time when North Vietnam and South Vietnam were reunified as one. However, it was also a time when the country showed signs of exhaustion from 30 years of wars, with the Vietnam People's Army engaged in a long, costly war in Cambodia and Northern border. The economy collapsed in the wake of a failed attempt to collectivize the southern economy, some key party members such as Bùi Tín and Hoàng Văn Hoan defected. It was under his rule that Vietnam survived the subsidy period. Later in 1986, the Sixth Party's Congress passed the Renovation policy which recognized the failure of collectivization and liberalized the economy, opening a new chapter in Vietnam's history.

Tôn Đức Thắng University, a top research university in Ho Chi Minh City, was named after him. Many avenues and roads in major metropolises . A Tôn Đức Thắng Museum opened in Ho Chi Minh City, on a boulevard also named after him and near the Ba Son Shipyard, in 1988, on the centenary of Tôn's birth.

Tôn Đức Thắng Museum in Ho Chi Minh City

== See also ==
- Sino-Soviet border conflict
- History of Vietnam
- Tôn Đức Thắng University
- Vietnam War

== Notes ==
Political offices
Preceded by Ho Chi Minh	President of North Vietnam; 1969–1976	Succeeded by Post abolished
Preceded by Nguyễn Hữu Thọ as Chairman of the Consultative Council of South Vietnam; Himself as President of North Vietnam	President of Vietnam; 1976–1980	Succeeded by Nguyễn Hữu Thọ
