= Nguyễn Thị Doan =

Vietnamese politician (born 1951)

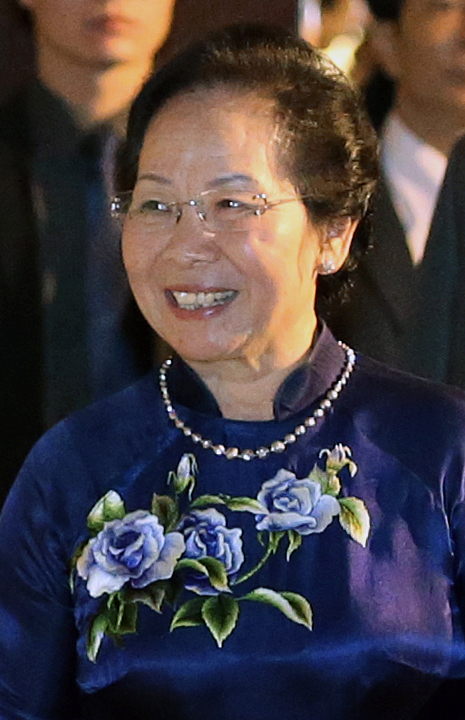
- Portrait of Madam Doan in 2013

Vice President of Vietnam
- In office 25 July 2007 – 8 April 2016
- President: Nguyễn Minh Triết; Trương Tấn Sang; Trần Đại Quang
- Preceded by: Trương Mỹ Hoa
- Succeeded by: Đặng Thị Ngọc Thịnh

Personal details
- Born: 8 November 1951 (age 75) Lý Nhân District, Hà Nam Province, North Vietnam
- Party: Communist Party of Vietnam (1981–2016)
- Education: Hanoi University of Commerce; University of National and World Economy

Nguyễn Thị Doan (born 8 November 1951) is a Vietnamese educator, former legislator, and Vietnamese politician, who was Vice President of Vietnam from 2007 to 2016. Nguyễn Thị Doan is a member of the Central Committee of the Communist Party of Vietnam, and a deputy to the National Assembly of Vietnam for Hà Nam Province.

Nguyễn Thị Doan was born on 1 November 1951, in the northern province of Hà Nam. She entered Hanoi University of Commerce for her degree in economics in 1977 and graduated in 1979. In the same year, Mrs. Doan became a lecturer of the university. She went to Bulgaria (PhD in economics in University of National and World Economy) and France (PhD in business administration) for graduate studies.

At the Eighth National Congress of the Communist Party of Vietnam in June 1996, Nguyễn Thị Doan was elected to the Party's Central Committee and became a member of the Central Committee's Supervisory Commission three years later. She was re-elected to the Party's Central Committee again in the Ninth and Tenth Congresses and served as the Permanent Deputy Chairman of the Supervisory Commission. She was named Vice-President of the Socialist Republic of Vietnam at the first session of the Twelfth National Assembly on 25 July 2007.

As of 22 September 2016, she is currently the Chairwoman of the Vietnam Association for Promoting Education.

Political offices
Preceded by Trương Mỹ Hoa	Vice President of Vietnam; 2007–2016	Succeeded by Đặng Thị Ngọc Thịnh
