= Nguyễn Lương Bằng =

Vietnamese revolutionary activist and politician

His Excellency Nguyễn Lương Bằng
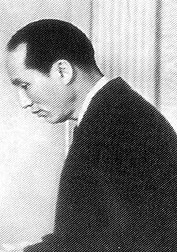

Vice President of Vietnam
- In office 2 July 1976 – 20 July 1979
- President: Tôn Đức Thắng
- Preceded by: Tôn Đức Thắng
- Succeeded by: Nguyễn Hữu Thọ

Personal details
- Born: 2 April 1904 French Indochina
- Died: 20 July 1979 (aged 75) Hanoi, Vietnam
- Party: Communist Party of Vietnam
- Spouse: Hà Thục Trinh

Nguyễn Lương Bằng (2 April 1904 – 20 July 1979) was a Vietnamese revolutionary activist and politician. He held the post as Vice President of Vietnam from 1969 to 1979 (North Vietnam until 1976), and General Director of Vietnam National Bank. He was North Vietnam's first ambassador in the Soviet Union from 1953 to 1956 and the Government Inspector General in 1956.

== Life and career ==
Bằng was born on April 2, 1904, into a poor family with patriotic traditions from Thanh Miện District in Hải Dương. Throughout his life he used the alias Anh Cả, and Sao Đỏ.

In December 1925, Bằng was admitted to the Vietnam Revolutionary Youth Association. From there he and some other patriotic youth attended political training classes led by Hồ Chí Minh Hồ Tùng Mậu, Lê Hồng Sơn. In October 1929, in Hong Kong he was admitted to the Communist Party led by Nguyễn Ái Quốc. (Note: Previous alias of Hồ Chí Minh) In May 1931, he was captured secretly detained in Catina Saigon. Shortly afterwards, he was taken down to the Sea of Shipping ship to Haiphong and put into detention at the Hỏa Lò prison in Hanoi. In late 1931, he was sent back to Hải Dương. In June 1932, the court of Hải Dương sentenced him to life imprisonment and transferred to Hỏa Lò prison. In late 1932 he escaped to Vĩnh Yên then to Thanh Miện (Hải Dương) to work. At the end of 1933, when he went to Bắc Giang, he was arrested and detained in Hỏa Lò (early 1934).

In May 1935, Bằng was sent to Sơn La prison. In 1943 the Party arranged for him to escape to Vạn Phúc village to meet Hoàng Văn Thụ to assume the task, he was nominated by the Party as an alternate member of the Party Central Committee, in charge of financial affairs and the military work of the Party; At the same time, he was assigned to work in the Việt Minh as leader of the General Department. After the August Revolution, Bằng held the post as General Director of the National Bank of Vietnam, the first ambassador of North Vietnam to the Soviet Union (1953-1956), head of the Central Commission for Inspection, government (1956). In September 1969, he was elected Vice President of Vietnam. He died on July 20, 1979, at the age of 75.
