= Nguyễn Thị Bình =

Vietnamese revolutionary leader

Her Excellency Nguyễn Thị Bình
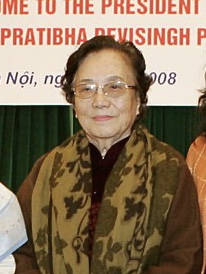
- Thị Bình in 2008

13th Vice President of Vietnam
- In office September 10, 1992 – August 8, 2002
- Preceded by: Nguyễn Thị Định
- Succeeded by: Trương Mỹ Hoa

2nd Chair of the National Assembly Foreign Affairs Committee
- In office February 16, 1987 – September 9, 1992
- Preceded by: Vũ Quang
- Succeeded by: Hoàng Bích Sơn

6th Minister of Education
- In office July 3, 1976 – February 15, 1987
- Prime Minister: Phạm Văn Đồng
- Preceded by: Nguyễn Văn Huyên
- Succeeded by: Phạm Minh Hạc

1st Minister of Foreign Affairs (Provisional Revolutionary Government)
- In office June 8, 1969 – July 2, 1976
- Prime Minister: Phạm Văn Đồng
- Preceded by: Office established
- Succeeded by: Office abolished

Personal details
- Born: Nguyễn Thị Châu Sa; 26 May 1927 (age 99) Châu Thành, Sa Đéc Province, Cochinchina, French Indochina (now in Đồng Tháp Province, Vietnam)
- Party: Communist Party of Vietnam
- Other political affiliations: People's Revolutionary Party of South Vietnam (1962–1975)
- Relations: Phan Châu Trinh (grandfather)
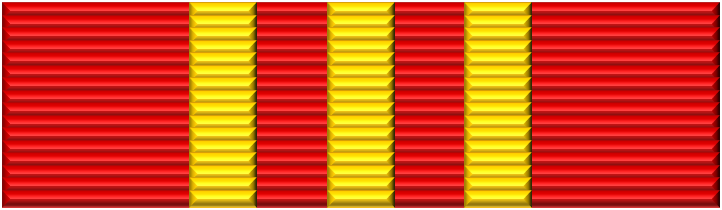
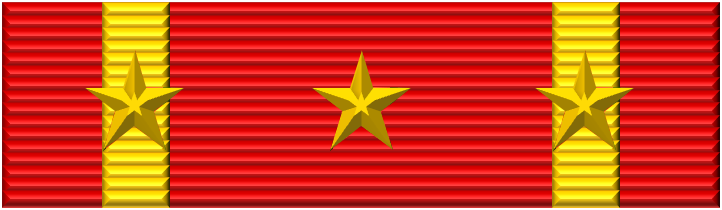
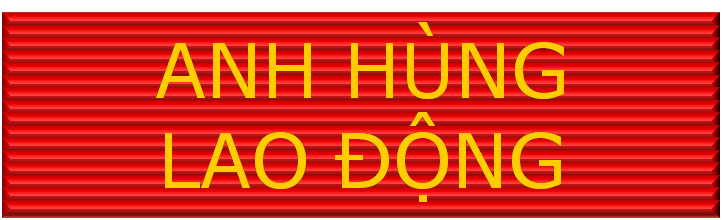
- Awards: Order of Ho Chi Minh; Resistance Order (2); Hero of Labour

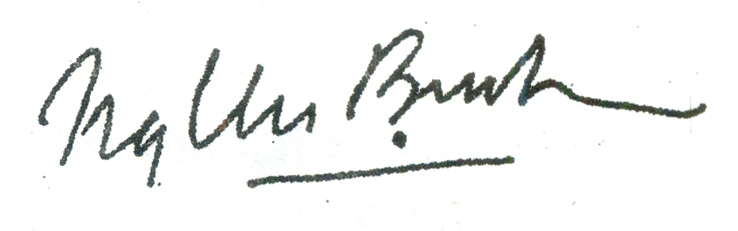
- Signature
- Nickname(s): Madame Bình; Yến Sa

Madam Nguyễn Thị Bình (Vietnamese pronunciation: [ŋwiən˦ˀ˥ tʰi˧˨ʔ ʔɓïŋ˨˩]; born Nguyễn Thị Châu Sa [ŋwiən˦ˀ˥ tʰi˧˨ʔ t͡ɕəw˧˧ saː˧˧]; 26 May 1927), also known as Madame Bình, (Note: In this Vietnamese name, the surname is Nguyễn, but is often simplified to Nguyen in English-language text. In accordance with Vietnamese custom, this person should be referred to by the given name, Bình.) is a South Vietnamese revolutionary leader, diplomat and politician. She became internationally known for her role as the Viet Cong (NLF)'s chief diplomat (Note: as Minister of Foreign Affairs of the Provisional Revolutionary Government of the Republic of South Vietnam) and leading its delegation to the Paris Peace Conference. The only woman among the signatories of the 1973 peace accords that ended American intervention in the Vietnam War, she later served in the government of reunified Vietnam after the Fall of Saigon and later became the country's Vice President in 1992. She is the first woman in Vietnamese history to be appointed a cabinet minister.

== Life and work ==
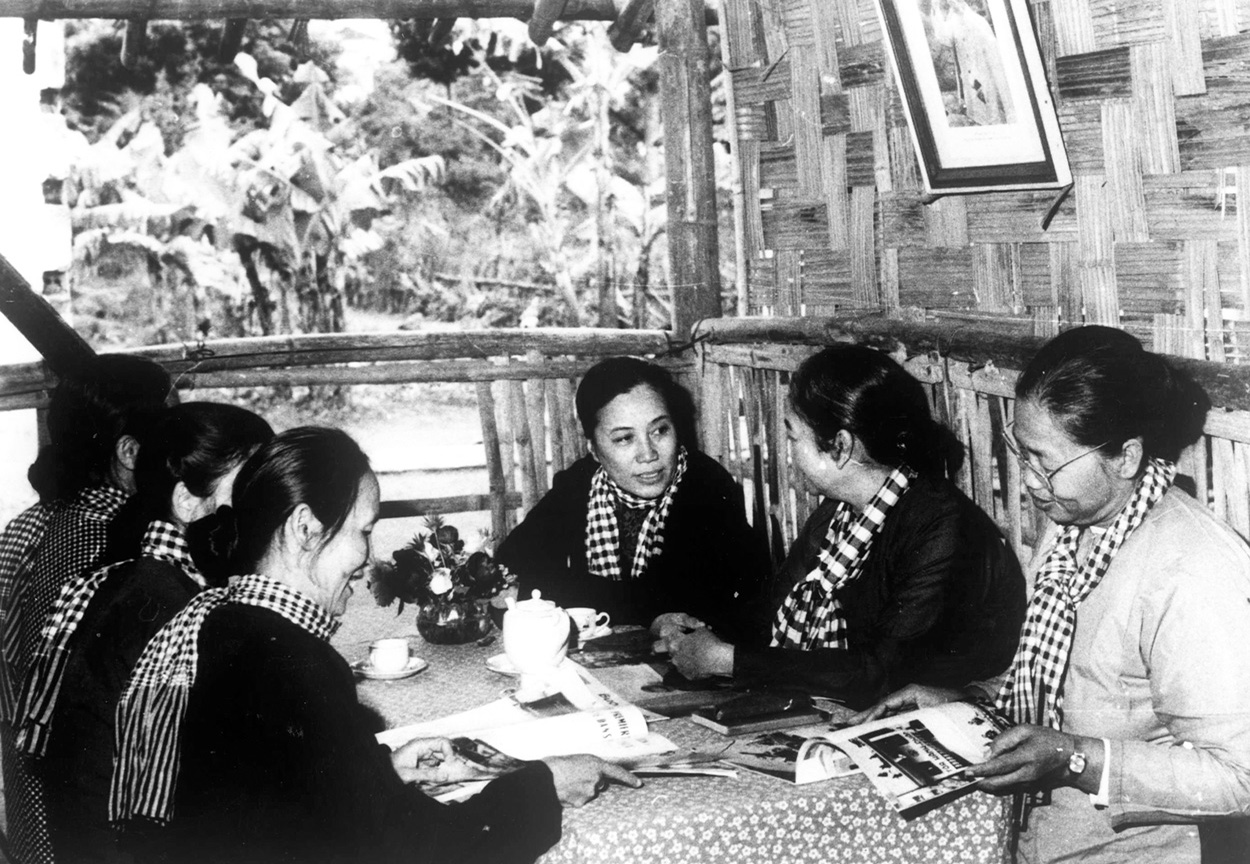
Photo of Nguyễn Thị Bình (centre-left) with Nguyễn Thị Định alongside other "Long-Haired Army" leaders.

Nguyễn Thị Bình was born in 1927 in An Tịch village, Châu Thành district, Sa Đéc Province (now Phú Hựu commune, Đồng Tháp province) and is a granddaughter of the Nationalist leader Phan Chu Trinh. She studied French at Lycée Sisowath in Cambodia and worked as a teacher during the French colonisation of Vietnam. She joined Vietnam's Communist Party in 1948. From 1945 to 1951, she took part in various intellectual movements against the French colonists. Subsequently, she was arrested and jailed between 1951 and 1953 in Chí Hòa Prison (Saigon) by the French colonial authority in Vietnam.

During the Vietnam War, she became a member of the Vietcong's Central Committee and a vice-chairperson of the South Vietnamese Women's Liberation Association. In 1969 she was appointed foreign minister of the Provisional Revolutionary Government of the Republic of South Vietnam. A fluent French speaker, Bình played a major role in the Paris Peace Accords, an agreement that was supposed to end the war and restore peace in Vietnam, which entered into force on 17 January 1973. She was expected to be replaced by a male Vietcong representative after preliminary talks, but quickly became one of the group's most visible international public figures. During this time, she was famous for representing Vietnamese women with her elegant and gracious style, and was referred to by the media as "Madame Bình". She was the only woman who signed the Paris Peace Accords.

Signature of Madame Bình on her capacity as Foreign Minister of the Provisional Revolutionary Government of the Republic of South Vietnam in a diplomatic document co-signed by Nguyễn Duy Trinh, her counterpart from the Democratic Republic of Vietnam (North Vietnam)

After the Vietnam War, she was appointed Minister of Education of the Socialist Republic of Vietnam and from 1982 to 1986, which made her the first female minister ever in the history of Viet Nam. Nguyen Thi Binh was a member of the Central Committee of Vietnam's Communist Party from 1987 to 1992. She was also the Deputy Chair of the Party's Central Foreign Affairs Commission and Chair of the National Assembly's Foreign Affairs Committee. The National Assembly elected her twice to the position of Vice President of the Socialist Republic of Vietnam for the terms 1992–1997 and 1997–2002. Since retiring from politics, Madame Bình has authored several op-eds, including a high-profile one on the state newspaper Nhân Dân in which she voiced concerns that the current personnel policy of the Communist Party of Vietnam have allowed some "incompetent and opportunistic" individuals to enter the party's apparatus. She also criticized the Party's focus on increasing membership at the expense of "quality."

From March 2009 to 2014, she served as a member of the support committee of Russell Tribunal on Palestine.

== Legacy ==
Madame Bình became the source of inspiration and namesake for Madame Binh Graphics Collective, a radical left all-women poster, printmaking, and street art collective based in New York City from 1970s to 1980s.

Madame Bình has been awarded many prestigious awards and honours, including the Order of Ho Chi Minh and the Resistance Order (First Class). In 2021, then-President of Vietnam Nguyễn Xuân Phúc awarded her the 75-year Party Membership Commemorative Medal. In 2025, General Secretary of the Communist Party of Vietnam Tô Lâm awarded her the title Hero of Labour. On May 2026, ambassador of the State of Palestine to Vietnam Saadi Salama awarded the Palestinian Order of the Star of Merit to her in recognition of her solidarity with the Palestinian people.

To commemorate the 75th anniversary of the Ministry of Foreign Affairs of Vietnam, the Government of Vietnam commissioned the official portraits for 12 former foreign ministers from 1945 to 2020. Nguyễn Thị Bình was included among them as the only South Vietnamese foreign minister and the only woman.

== Notes ==
Political offices
Preceded by Nguyễn Hữu Thọ	Vice President of Vietnam; 1992–2002	Succeeded by Trương Mỹ Hoa
