= Quốc Tử Giám =

Quốc Tử Giám can refer to:

- Imperial Academy, Huế
- Temple of Literature, Hanoi
- Vietnamese reading of the characters in Guozijian
