= Chu Văn An High School =

Chu Văn An High School may refer to:

- Chu Văn An High School (Hanoi)
- Chu Văn An High School (Ho Chi Minh City)
