= Vietnamese Confucianism =

Vietnamese reception and practice of Confucianism

- Nho giáo (lit. "Confucian teaching")
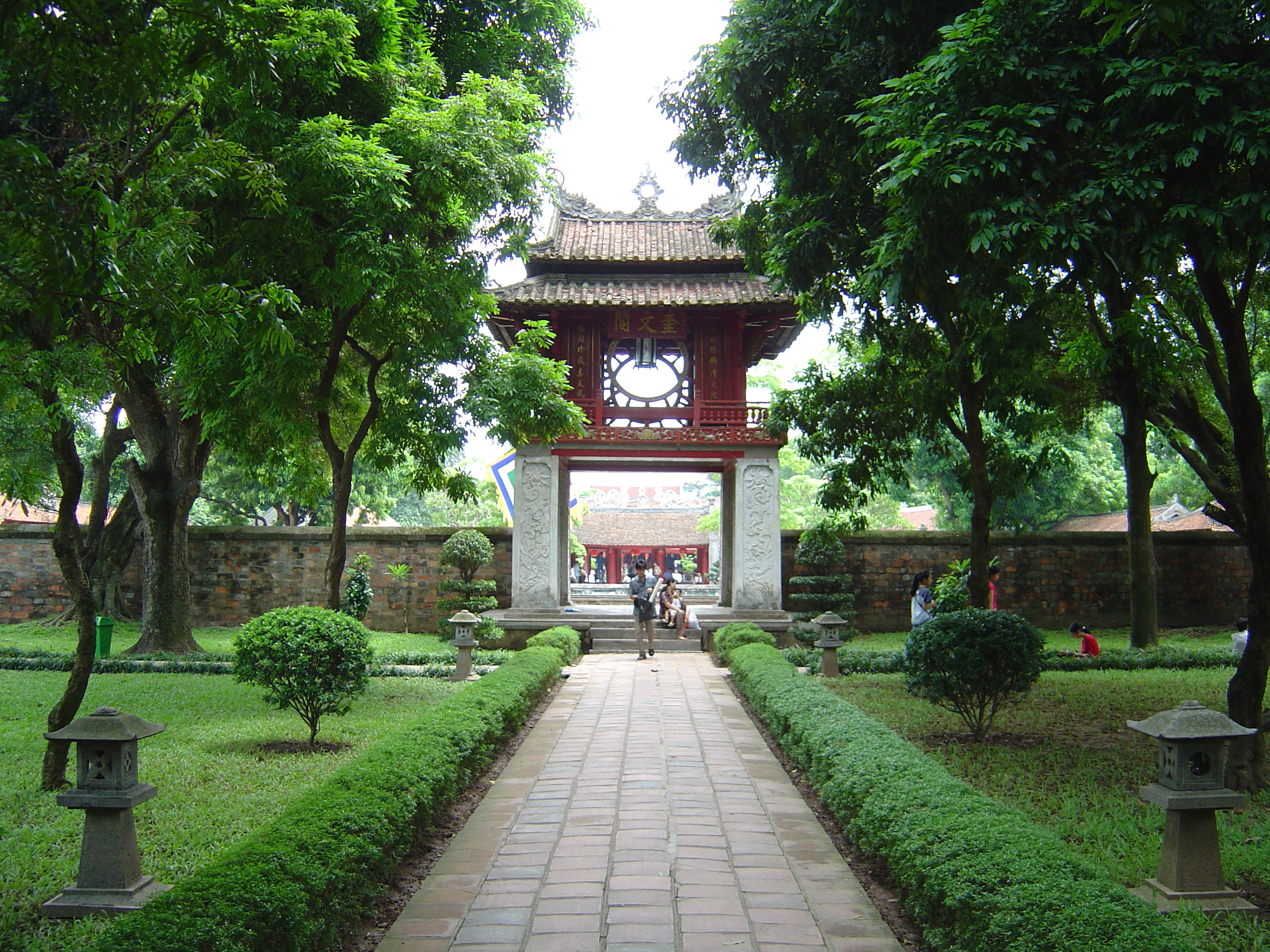
- Main entrance of the Temple of Literature in Hanoi, founded in 1070 as a state temple of Confucius
- Scripture: Four Books and Five Classics
- Theology: Confucianism (especially Neo-Confucianism)
- Founder: Confucius

Vietnamese Confucianism covers the reception, adaptation, and institutional role of Confucianism in Vietnam, especially in statecraft, education, and elite moral discourse. Confucian learning entered Vietnam during long periods of Chinese rule and became closely tied to a literati bureaucracy and an examination route to office under Vietnamese dynasties. It remained central to imperial governance and schooling into the early 20th century. Under French Indochina, reforms reshaped administration and education, and the Confucian civil service examinations ended in 1919.

== History ==
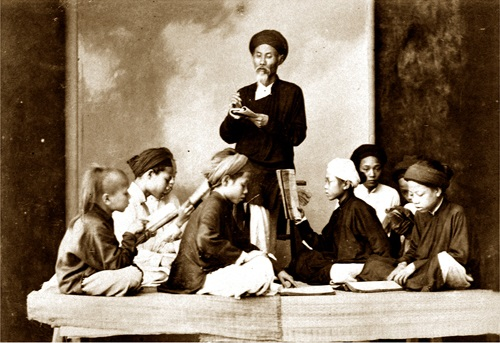
A private class at a home in Vietnam (1895). The students studying are sitting on a sập.

Confucian texts, administrative practices, and Classical Chinese literacy spread in northern Vietnam over more than a millennium of Chinese rule, alongside other elements of the wider Sinosphere. After the reestablishment of Vietnamese dynastic rule in the 10th century, court patronage of Confucian learning developed alongside other religious and intellectual currents, including Buddhism and Taoism. In 1070, the Lý dynasty founded the Temple of Literature in Thăng Long (present-day Hanoi) as a state temple dedicated to Confucius, and in 1076 established the Imperial Academy (Quốc Tử Giám) as a training institution for court officials.

A Confucian civil service examination system emerged as a state mechanism for recruiting officials and organizing elite education, with the first major court examination traditionally dated to 1075. The system expanded under later dynasties and became closely associated with an ideal of scholar-officials selected through mastery of the Confucian classics and prescribed literary forms. Under the Later Lê dynasty, royal policies emphasized Confucian learning in governance and talent recruitment, especially during the reign of Lê Thánh Tông.

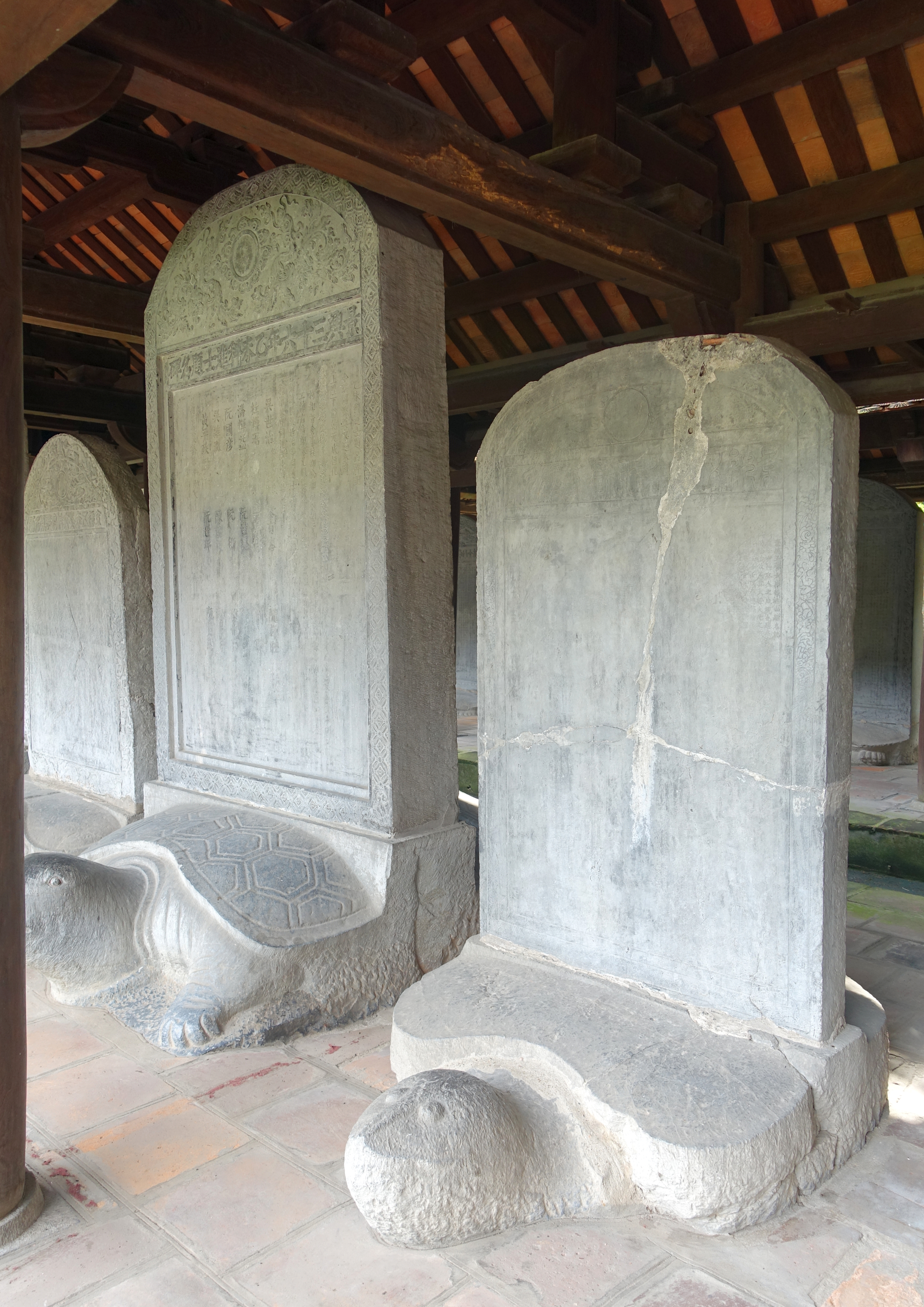
Stone stelae at the Temple of Literature record successful candidates in royal examinations.

In Hanoi, the Temple of Literature preserves a major corpus of commemorative stelae that list successful candidates in royal examinations and include inscriptions on learning and governance. The collection known as the "Stone Stele Records of Royal Examinations of the Le and Mac dynasties (1442-1779)" was inscribed on UNESCO's Memory of the World register in 2011.

Under the Nguyễn dynasty (1802-1945), Confucian statecraft and institutions continued to shape court administration, education, and official culture, while also evolving in response to internal reforms and foreign pressure. Colonial rule under France introduced competing educational paths and reforms to examinations and administration, and the Confucian civil service examinations were abolished in 1919. The French administrators, however, continued to rely on Confucian-calibrated civil services to govern Annam, Tonkin, and even Cochinchina. Top colonial officials viewed Confucianism as the pillar of Vietnamese society and a useful means of maintaining order and legitimizing French rule, while distrusting both Buddhists and Catholics of Vietnamese descent.

== Institutions and education ==
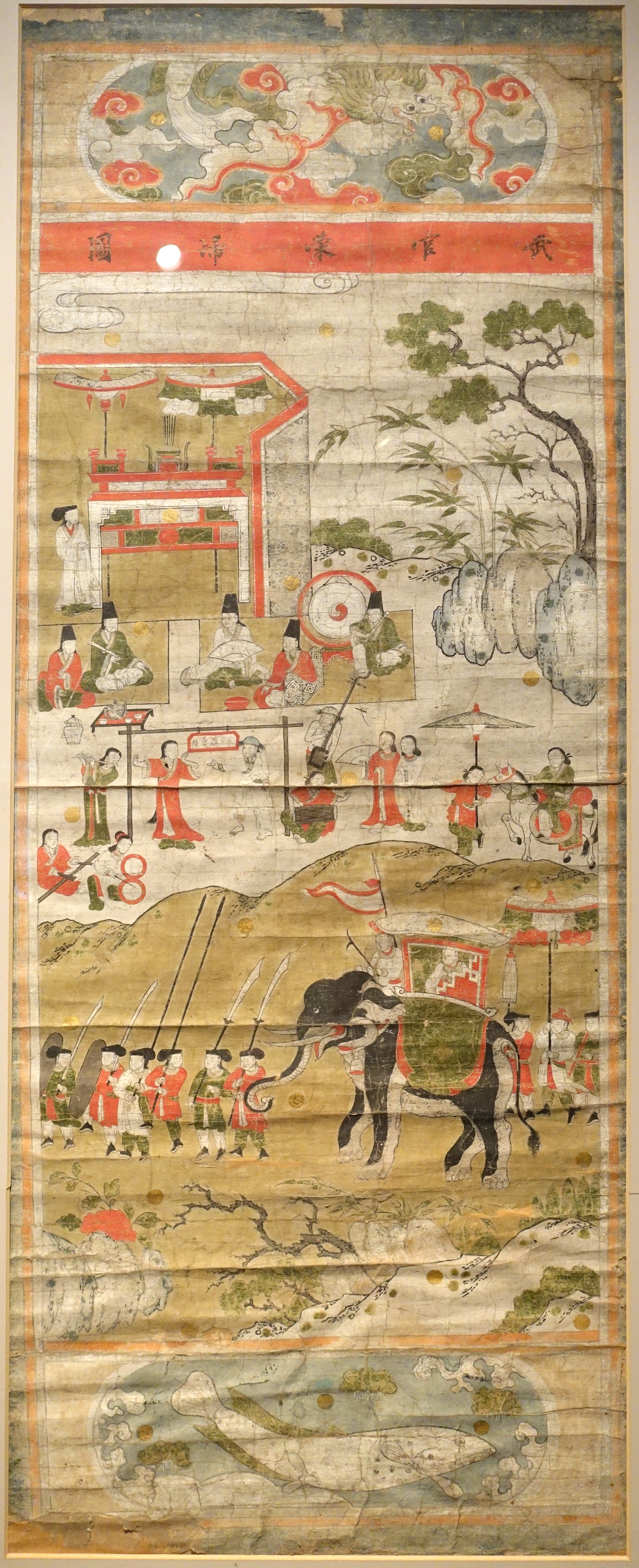
A military mandarin returning in glory (榮歸; vinh quy) after the examination in the painting, 武官榮歸圖 (Vũ quan vinh quy đồ)

Vietnamese Confucianism is closely tied to state-sponsored education and the examination system, which linked local schooling to access to office through successive rounds of tests. The system typically ran through provincial (thi Hương), metropolitan (thi Hội), and palace (thi Đình) examinations, with ranked degrees and, in some periods, commemoration through public inscriptions and court ceremonies. The UNESCO-inscribed stelae at Hanoi's Temple of Literature show how examination success was memorialized and how court culture tied learning to governance.

Candidates were assessed through compositions grounded in Confucian texts and associated literary forms, and the system sustained a class of scholar-officials whose cultural authority rested on mastery of this curriculum. The imperial examination system is generally dated from the 11th century to the final court examination in 1919, with centuries of periodic sessions across dynasties. Heritage sites and museums continue to present the examinations as a framework for Vietnamese Confucian learning.

== Texts and language ==
Vietnamese Confucian education traditionally relied on elite literacy in Chinese characters (chữ Hán) and study of the canonical Confucian corpus, particularly the Four Books and Five Classics. Over time, Vietnamese scholars also developed and used chữ Nôm for vernacular writing, while formal court learning and examinations continued to privilege Classical Chinese for extended periods. In the colonial era and early 20th century, the expanding role of chữ Quốc ngữ and French-language education contributed to the decline of the classical curriculum as a state pathway to office.

Various Vietnamese scholars have also written several commentaries:

- Thư kinh diễn nghĩa (書經衍義)
- Dịch phu tùng thuyết (易膚叢說)
- Xuân Thu quản kiến (春秋管見)
- Chu Dịch cứu nguyên (周易究原)
- Luận ngữ ngu án (論語愚按)

== Legacy and commemoration ==
Sites associated with Confucian learning and examinations remain prominent in Vietnam's cultural heritage landscape. The Temple of Literature in Hanoi is a historic monument and a venue for exhibitions and state and diplomatic visits. Heritage coverage also highlights the long-running examination system and its end in 1919. UNESCO's Memory of the World inscription for the Hanoi stelae is cited as recognition of the documentary value of the examination records and inscriptions.

== See also ==
- Confucian court examination system in Vietnam
- Temple of Literature, Hanoi
- Imperial Academy, Huế
- Vietnamese philosophy
- History of Vietnam
- Religion in Vietnam
