= Chu Văn An High School (Ho Chi Minh City) =

Chu Van An High School
- Trường Trung học Chu Văn An

Location
- Ngo Gia Tu Blvd. (formerly Minh Mang Blvd.); Ho Chi Minh City; Vietnam; 10.7570°N 106.6665°E

Information
- Type: High School
- Established: 1961

Chu Van An High School is a high school in Saigon, Vietnam. The school is located at the intersection of Ngo Gia Tu Blvd. (formerly Minh Mang Blvd.) and Ngo Quyen St. (formerly Trieu Da St.), District 5, Ho Chi Minh City. Originally, the school was founded by teachers and students of Buoi High School who moved to Saigon from the north following the 1954 Geneva Conference. After a time of operation under the sponsorship of Petrus Ky High School, these people built a new high school at Minh Mang St. in 1961 and named it after Chu Van An, a famous Vietnamese Confucianism teacher of Tran Dynasty. After the end of the Vietnam War in 1975, the school continued operating under this name. In 1978, the school was dissolved and its students were transferred into nearby high schools. The school's building was transferred to a new school named Huấn Nghệ Phổ thông Lao động School (Training of General Labor Skills School). Later, the school was revived by the end of the 1990s under a new education program.

== Headmasters ==
- Trần Văn Việt
- Nguyễn Hữu Văn
- Đàm Xuân Thiều
- Bùi Đình Tấn
- Dương Minh Kính
- Nguyễn Xuân Quế
