= Chu Văn An =

Physician and mandarin of the Tran dynasty (1292 – c. 1370)

Chu Văn An 朱文安
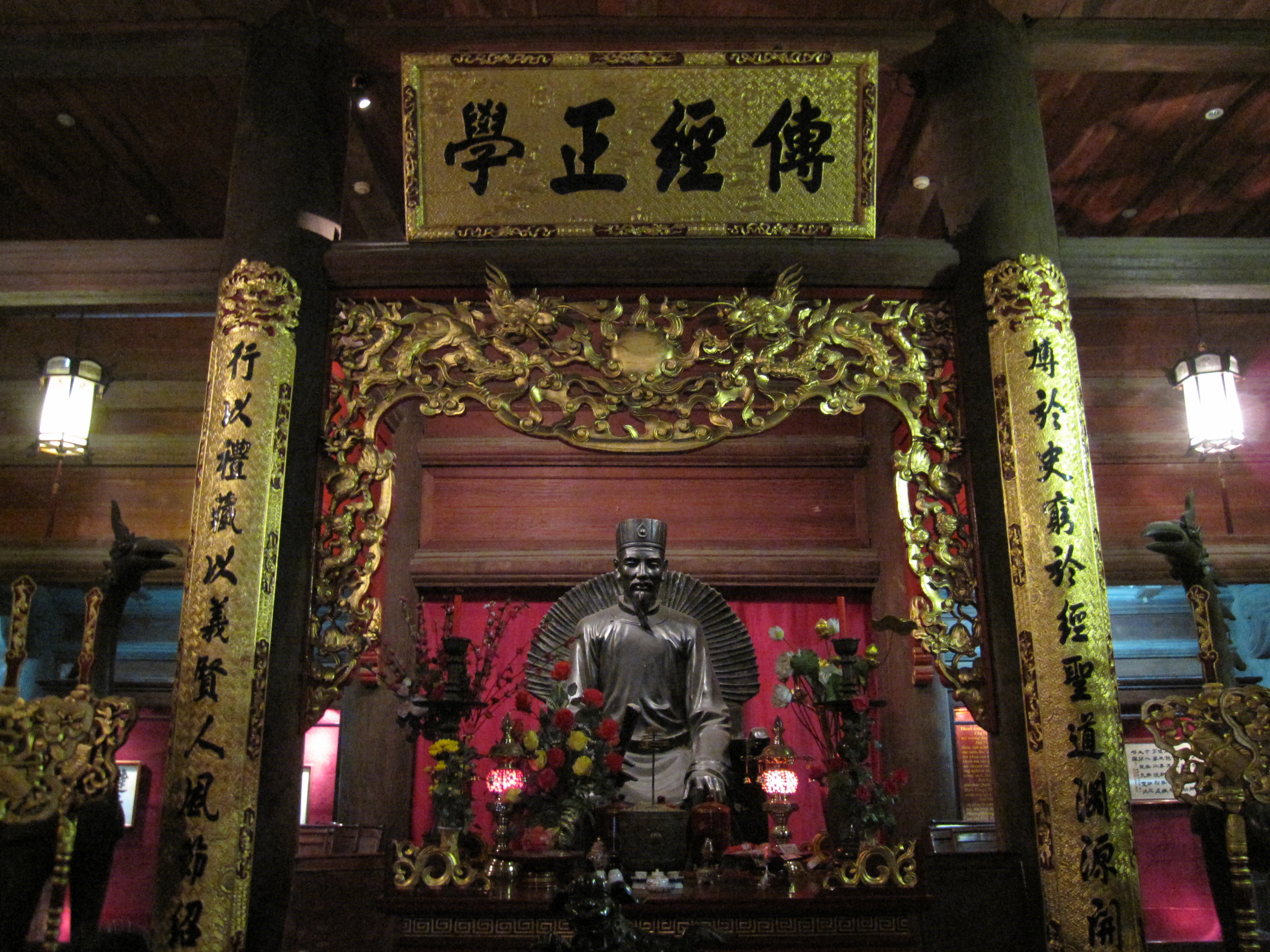
- Statue of Chu in the Temple of Literature in Hanoi, Vietnam

Vietnamese name
- Vietnamese: 朱文安
- Vietnamese alphabet: Chu Văn An
- Hán-Nôm: 朱文安

Chu Văn An (born Chu An, 25 August 1292 – c. 1370) was a Confucian, teacher, physician, and high-ranking mandarin of the Trần dynasty in Đại Việt. His courtesy name was Linh Triệt (靈徹), while his art name was Tiều Ẩn (樵隱). He was later given the posthumous name Văn Trinh.

== Early life ==
He was born in Văn Thôn village, Quang Liệt commune, in present-day Thanh Tri district, Hanoi. In the early life, he was famous as a straightforward man who passed the doctoral examination (Thái Học Sinh / 太學生) but refused to become a mandarin. Instead, An opened a school and began his career as a Confucian teacher in Huỳnh Cung village in Thanh Tri. An's teaching played an important role in spreading Confucianism into what was at the time Buddhist Vietnam.

Under the reign of Tran Minh Tong (1314–1329), he became a teacher at the imperial academy (國子監) where he was responsible for teaching crown prince Vuong, the future emperor Tran Hien Tong. Under the reign of emperor Tran Du Tong, he became a high-ranking mandarin.

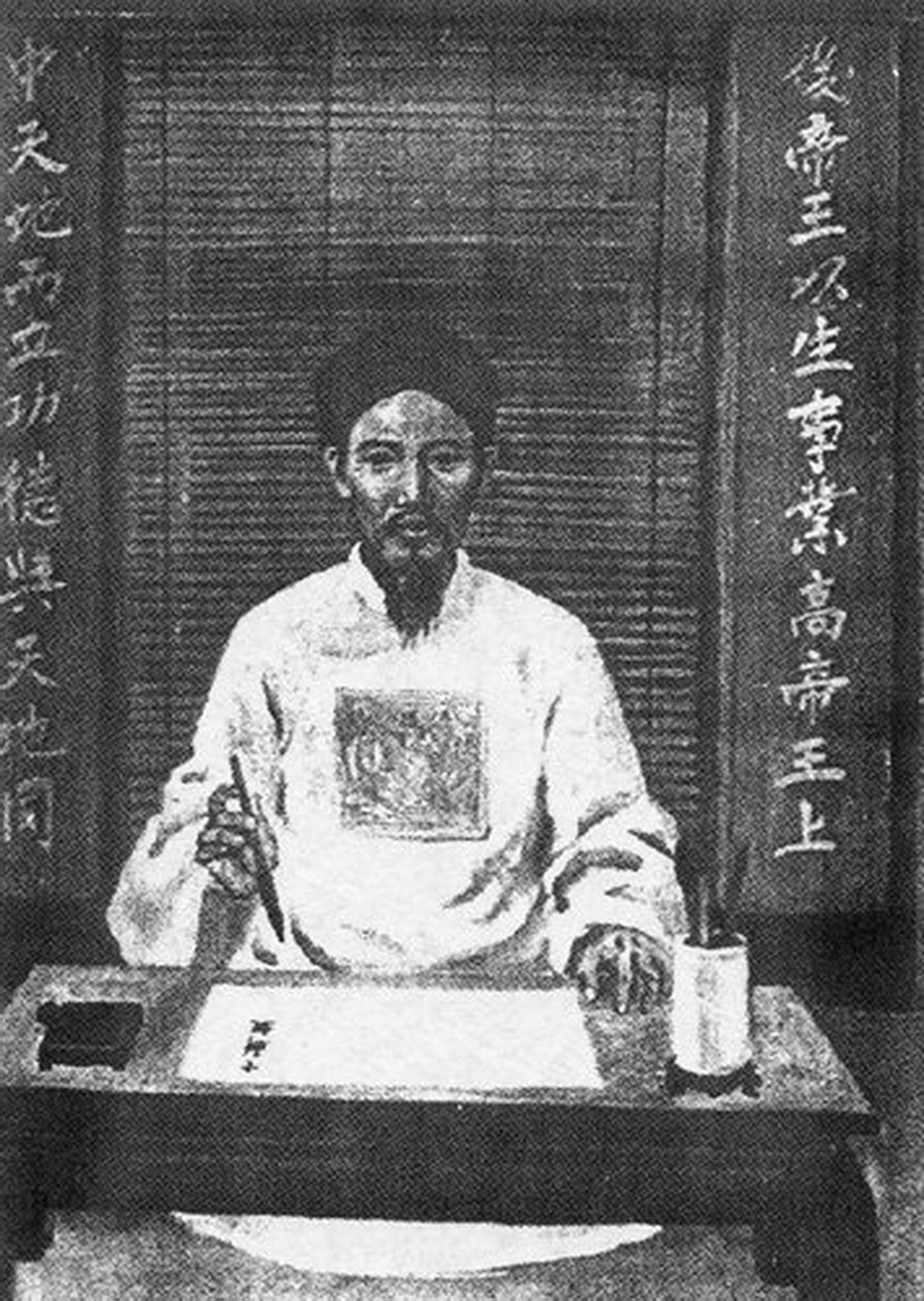
Painting of Chu Văn An

Later, he resigned and return to his home village because Tran Du Tong refused his request of beheading seven other mandarins whom he accused of corruption. For the rest of his life, An continued teaching and wrote books. He died of illness in 1370.

An altar was erected in his honour in the Temple of Literature in Hanoi, where he is still revered.

== Petition to behead corrupt officials ==
The Seven Decapitations Petition (七斬疏) was written by Chu Văn An and presented to emperor Trần Dụ Tông to propose the beheading of seven officials he considered corrupt.

Initially, as Dụ Tông was still a child, his father, emperor Trần Minh Tông, was in charge of the court. After his father died (in 1357), Dụ Tông took charge. However, he was incapable of ruling.

During emperor Trần Dụ Tông's reign, the social situation became disturbing. Dụ Tông loved drinking, having fun with women and music. Officials were incompetent, pampering the emperor so that they could abuse their power. Famine was widespread. Loyal and dutiful subjects were killed. The court's historians, whose job was to dissuade the emperor, tried, but Dụ Tông did not listen.

Chu Văn An was a righteous and straightforward official highly respected at court. The petition was lost, and its contents remain unknown. Even at that time, few people knew who were on his list. Still, the petition shook the country.

== See also ==
- Chu Van An High School (Hanoi)
- Chu Van An High School (Ho Chi Minh City)
