= Imperial Academy, Huế =

Former academy in Huế, Vietnam

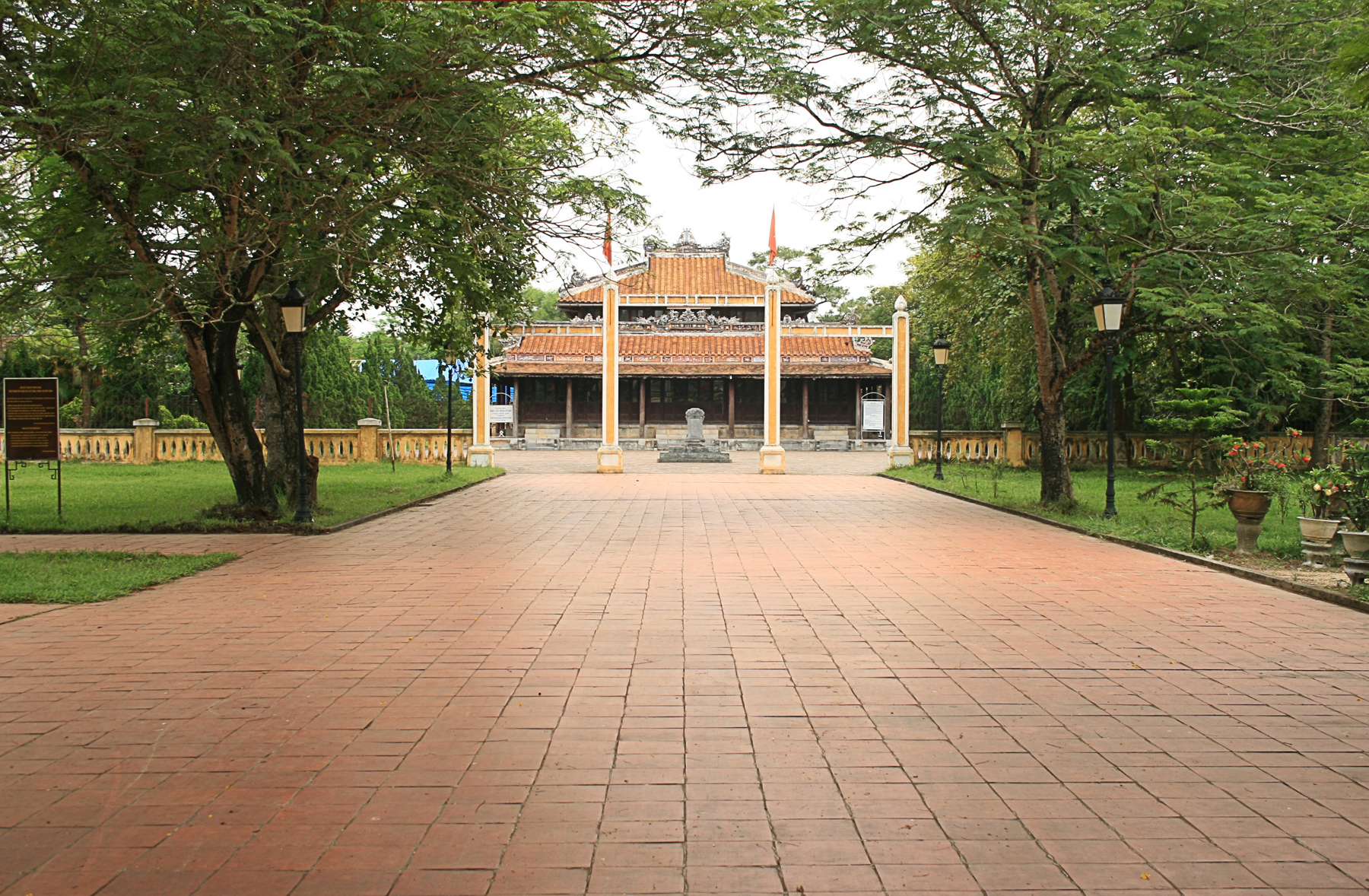
Entrance of the Imperial Academy in Huế

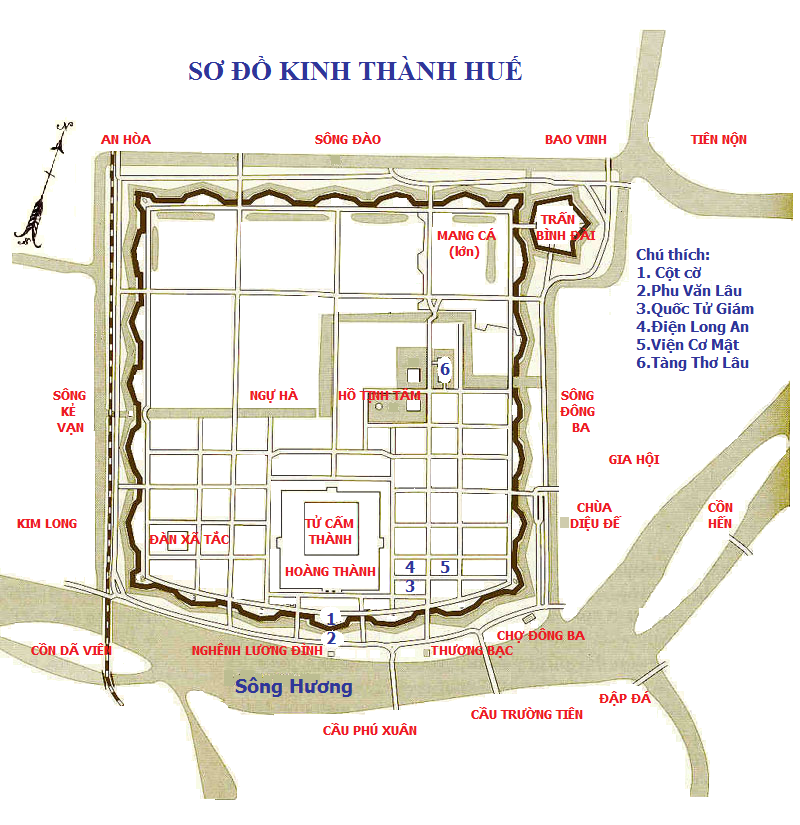
Imperial Academy (Quốc Tử Giám) as number 3.

The Imperial Academy (Vietnamese: Quốc Tử Giám, chữ Hán: 國子監) was the national academy during the Nguyễn dynasty. It was located on the right side of the Imperial City of Huế.

== History ==
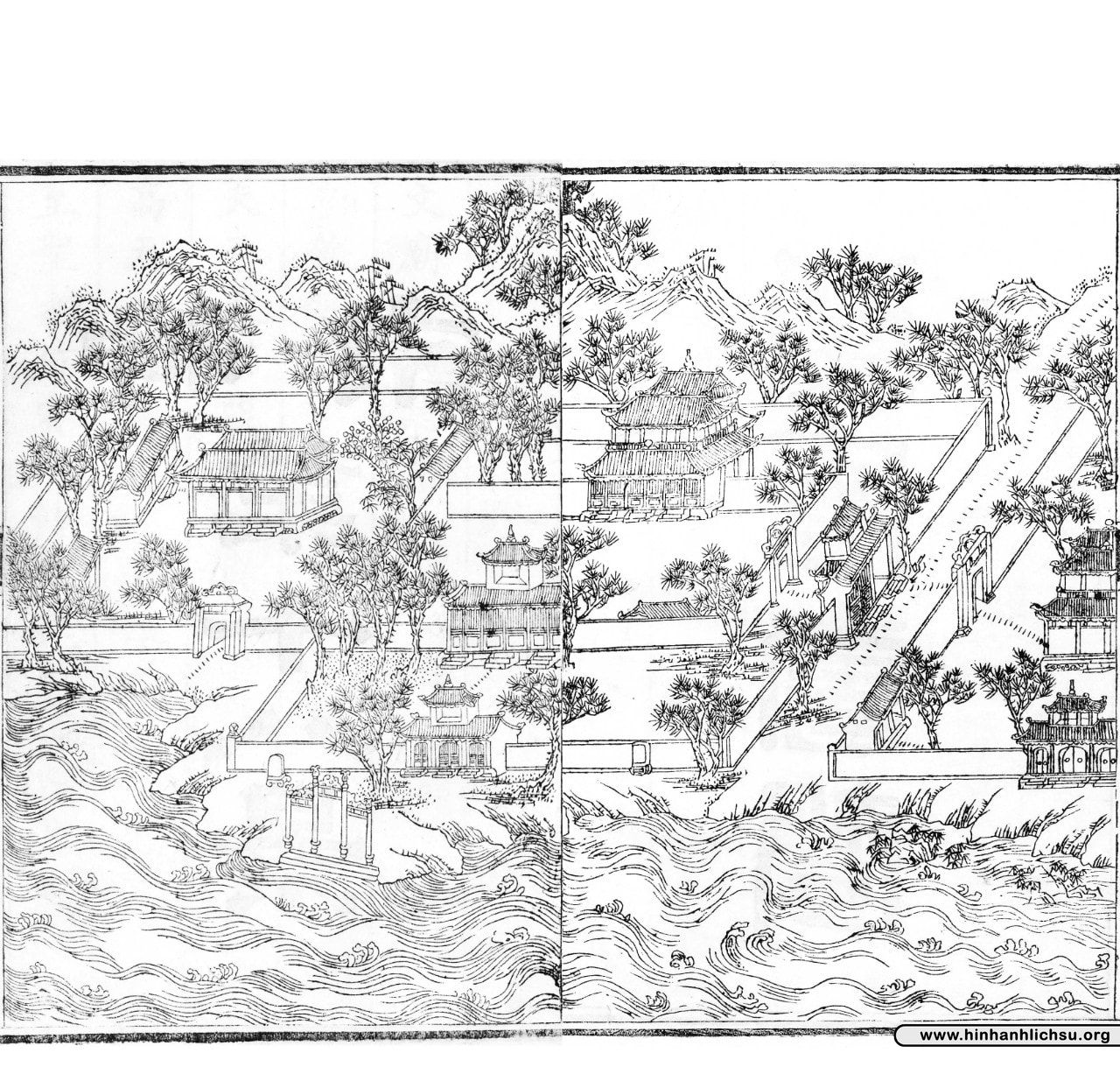
Imperial Academy in the Thần kinh thập nhị cảnh (神京二十景) set of landscape paintings painted in the 5th year of Thiệu Trị, 1845

After the unification of Vietnam, Emperor Gia Long decided to move the capital from Hanoi to Huế. Following this decision, in 1803, a new Confucian academy was built in order to replace the Lê dynasty's Quốc Tử giám. The first academy, called Đốc Học đường, was a small block of buildings located at An Ninh Thượng village, Hương Trà district, some 5 kilometres east of Huế. It stood next to a Văn miếu (Confucian academy).

By March 1820, emperor Minh Mạng changed the academy name into Quốc Tử Giám (Imperial Academy) and had the buildings rebuilt. He also expanded the academy by building the Di Luân Palace which consisted of one teaching hall, two teaching rooms and 19 classrooms.

Under the reign of emperor Tự Đức, the academy was enlarged again. The emperor had a wall built around the academy and visit the academy by himself. Tự Đức also built a stone stele which contains his commandments for students. In 1904, Imperial Academy of Huế was badly damaged by a hurricane but was repaired soon after.

In 1908, under the reign of emperor Duy Tân, the Imperial Academy of Huế was moved into Imperial City, Huế (its present location). Almost all buildings was completely rebuilt except the Di Luân Palace.

In 1945, following the fall of Nguyễn dynasty, the academy was permanently closed.

== See also ==
- Guozijian
- Vietnamese Confucianism
