= Nguyen Hue High School for the Gifted =

Coordinates: 20.9609°N 105.7598°E

- Trường Trung học phổ thông chuyên Nguyễn Huệ

Location
- No. 560B Quang Trung Street, La Khe Ward, Ha Dong District; Hanoi, Vietnam

Information
- School type: State school
- Established: March 1947; 79 years ago
- Website: http://chuyennguyenhue.edu.vn/

Nguyen Hue High School for the Gifted (Trường Trung học phổ thông chuyên Nguyễn Huệ) is a public magnet specialized high school of Hanoi, Vietnam, was founded in March 1947. This is one of 4 specialized schools under the Department of Education and Training of Hanoi, including 11 specialized classes (Math, Computer Science, Physics, Chemistry, Biology, Literature, History, Geography, English, French, Russian).

Similar to other magnet high schools, Nguyen Hue High School for the Gifted is recognised for its strong academic programs and its large percentage (98-100%) of graduates attending the most prestigious universities in Vietnam and abroad.

== History ==
In March 1947, Nguyen Hue School was established in Sam village, Trinh Tiet commune, My Duc district, Ha Dong province (later Ha Tay, now in Hanoi). The Inter-regional Education Department III appoints teacher Nguyen Dinh Quang to be the first principal. After that, from 1947–1954, the teachers Hoàng Đình Ân, Nguyễn Khắc Cương and Lê Hoàng Oánh took over this position; with the first generation of teachers of the school: Chu Xuan Nguyen, Nguyen Van Binh, Nguyen Van Minh, To Thao,...

First courses, the school recruited nearly 200 students, placed in 4 classes. . They were students, cadres from Hanoi evacuated to the resistance and students of Ha Dong province (free zone and temporary occupied area). The first, second and third classes are studied in the elementary school in Seu village, the fourth class is in the communal house.

On March 30, 1948, My Duc district committee decided to establish the first branch of the school. On November 17, 1949, the school conducted the first Principal Conference, led by Tuong Toan Chinh, who was the principal.

In 1984 the school had a specialization system and in 1988 the French system was established. In 1995, Mr. Vu Tich retired, and Mr. Thai Van Binh became the principal.

The school was awarded the Third Class Labor Medal by the State Council in 1987, the Second Labor Medal in 1990 and the First Labor Medal in 1997. In 1997, in the spirit of the Central Resolution 2 implementing the educational goal "Improving people's knowledge - Training human resources - Fostering talents", the provincial People's Committee and the Department of Education and Training of Ha Tay assigned to the home. School a new mission to train gifted students for the province.

On July 8, 1997, the Provincial People's Committee issued Decision No. 689 / QD-UB transforming Nguyen Hue High School into Nguyen Hue Specialized High School, the school has only 3 systems specializing in Math, French and Chemistry. learn. The school currently has 11 majors in Math, Physics, Chemistry, Biology, Informatics, Literature, History, Geography, English, French and Russian.

== Facilities and equipment ==
Funding for building the school is about VND 250 billion. The total area of the school is 15 600m^{2}, in which working area, dormitory is 11 000 m^{2}, dormitory 4 600 m^{2}.

The school has 52 classrooms, 20 subject classrooms, 11 laboratories, 02 library rooms (an electronic library room with 72 computers with internet access and a reading room; a gymnasium 01 gymnasium multi-function, 01 swimming pool, 01 football field, basketball court, volleyball court with full training equipment; 01 hall with a capacity of 450 seats; 01 meeting room for 150 seats; working area for brand houses with 36 functional rooms with full equipment; boarding area with 130 self-contained rooms can cater for all boarding students and fast food for students throughout the school.

== Achievements ==
=== Awards ===
- The Labor Hero Unit (Hero of Labor - Đơn vị anh hùng lao động): 2000
- Third-class Independence Medal (Order of Independence - Huân chương độc lập): 2003
- Second-class Independence Medal (Order of Independence - Huân chương độc lập): 2008

=== IJSO (International Junior Science Olympiad) ===
Student Nguyen Dinh Hieu (10th grade Specialist Nguyen Hue High School) won a Silver Medal at the International Junior Science Olympiad 2019.

== Incident(s) ==
On August 16, 2015, a drowning accident occurred at the school's swimming pool, causing a female soldier to die.

== Notable alumni ==
- Nguyễn Ngọc Thuỷ, President of Egroup, General Director of Apax English Joint Stock Company.
