= Chu Văn An High School, Hanoi =

Public school in Hanoi, Vietnam

Coordinates: 21.043251°N 105.833445°E

Chu Van An High School for the Gifted
- Trường Trung học Phổ thông chuyên Chu Văn An
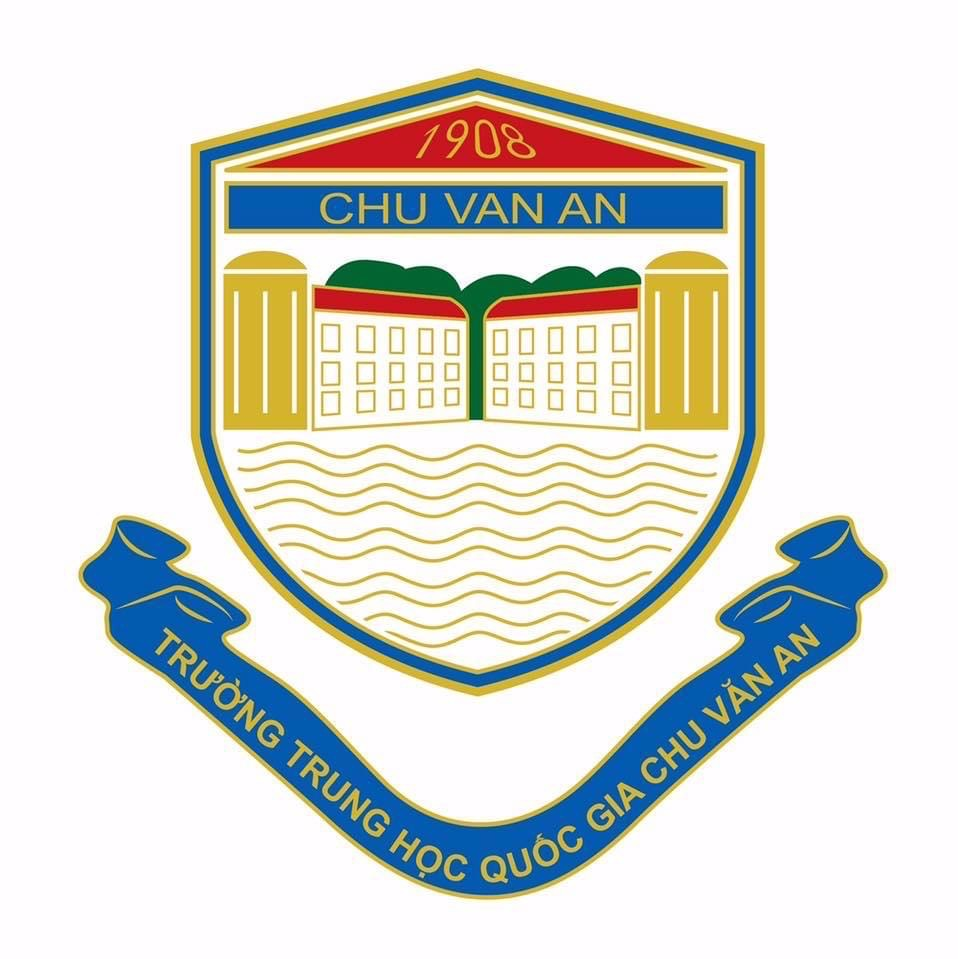

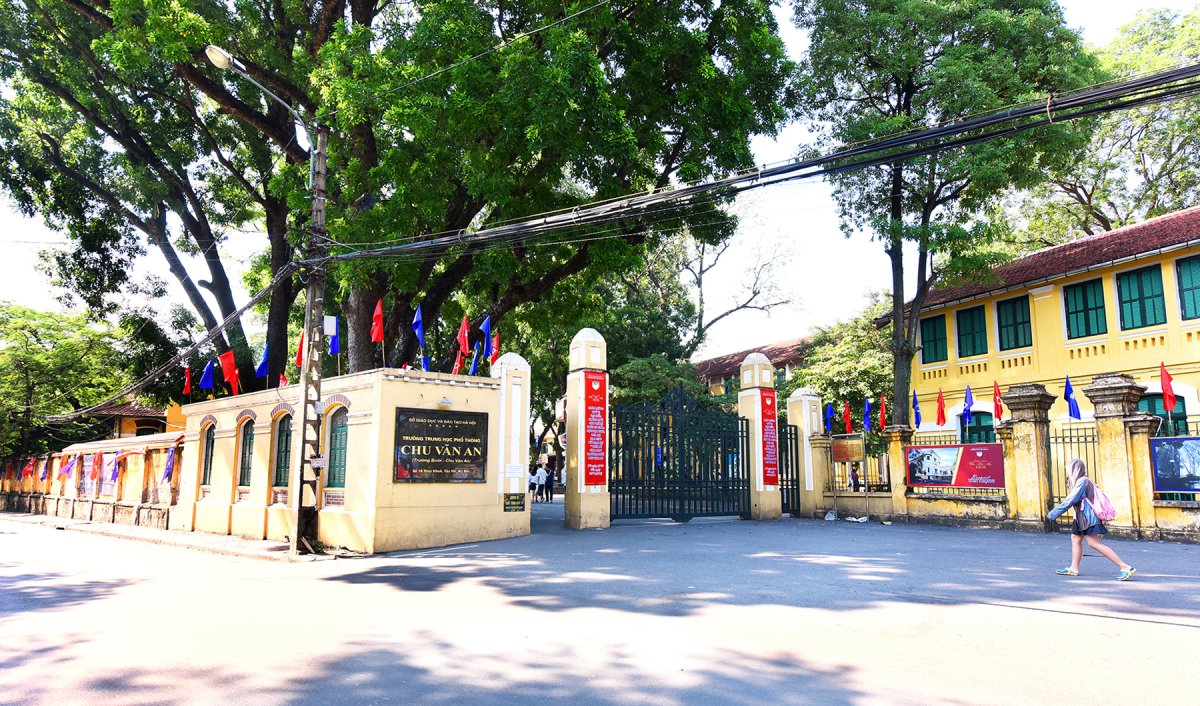

Location
- 10 Thuy Khue Street, Tay Ho; Hanoi; Vietnam

Information
- Former names: Collège du Protectorat/Trường Thành chung Bảo hộ (1908–1931); Lycée du Protectorat/Trường Trung học Bảo hộ (1931–1945); Trường Trung học Phổ thông Chu Văn An (1945-2025)
- Type: Public
- Motto: Yêu nước – Cách mạng – Dạy tốt – Học giỏi (Patriotic – Revolutionary – Good Teaching – Good Studying)
- Established: 1908
- School district: Ba Dinh-Tay Ho
- Category: National High School
- Principal: Nguyễn Thị Nhiếp
- Faculty: ~170 (2024/2025 school year)
- Grades: Year 10 – Year 12
- Enrollment: 2,338 (2024/2025 school year)
- Student Union/Association: Đoàn trường THPT Chu Văn An
- Colour: Light blue
- Nickname: Trường Bưởi (lit. Pomelo School)
- Website: http://c3chuvanan.edu.vn/

Chu Van An High School for the Gifted (Vietnamese: Trường Trung học phổ thông chuyên Chu Văn An), also known as "Pomelo School" (Vietnamese: trường Bưởi) is one of the three national high schools for the gifted in Vietnam along with Quoc Hoc High School in Huế and Le Hong Phong High School in Ho Chi Minh City. It is also one of the four magnet high schools in Hanoi, Vietnam, along with Hanoi-Amsterdam High School, Son Tay High School and Nguyen Hue High School.

Established by the French authorities in 1908 as College of the Protectorate (French: Collège du Protectorat), Chu Van An is one of the oldest institutions for secondary education in Southeast Asia. Despite initially intending to train native civil servants to serve the French colonial establishments, Vietnamese students at Bưởi school often struggled against colonial doctrine.

== History ==
On 12 December 1908, the Governor-General of Indochina Antony Wladislas Klobukowski made the decision to establish Collège du Protectorat (College of the Protectorate, similar to the secondary school) based on the merger of the Thông ngôn Bờ sông school, the Jules Ferry Nam Dinh secondary school and the pedagogy class (Cours normal) on Pottier street. In 1931, the school was upgraded to a lycée (similar to the high school) – Lycée du Protectorat (The school of Protectorate). Since the school was built on the land of Thụy Khuê village, whose vernacular name was Kẻ Bưởi, it was often referred to as Bưởi School.

By 1943, the school had to move to the Phúc Nhạc monastery in Ninh Bình. In 1945, they returned to Hà Nội. After Japan overthrew France, on 12 June 1945, the northern king's special envoy Phan Kế Toại decided to change the school's name to Chu Van An – named after the most well-respected teacher in Vietnamese history Chu Văn An, and appointed professor Nguyễn Gia Tường to the principal position. Tường was the first Vietnamese principal of the Bưởi – Chu Văn An High School.

From 1970 to 1993, the school used to share facilities with Ba Dinh High School, when a school would teach in the morning, while the other would teach in the afternoon. Two have merged since January 1993.

On 17 February 1995, along with Quoc Hoc High School in Hue and Le Hong Phong High School in Ho Chi Minh City, Chu Van An High School has been planned and constructed by Prime Minister Võ Văn Kiệt to become one of three national high schools in Vietnam.

On 2 November 2003, Chu Van An High School was designated as a national historical relic.

Since 2019, Chu Van An High School has been the first school in Hanoi and Vietnam to be a member of the Cambridge Assessment International Education (CAIE) organization, making it eligible to train students under the dual degree programme (Vietnamese National Diploma & Cambridge International A-Level).

In 2023, Principal Nguyen Thi Nhiep proposed to the Hanoi Department of Education and Training to turn Chu Van An High School into a high school only for the gifteds.

On 15 January 2025, People's Committee of Hanoi City issued a decision to reorganize and turn Chu Van An High School into a high school for the gifted. As of the decision, Chu Van An High School effectively changed its name to Chu Van An High School for the Gifted.

== Admission ==
As one of the four high schools for gifted students in Hanoi (together with Hanoi - Amsterdam High School, Son Tay High School and Nguyen Hue High School for the Gifted), Chu Van An High School is highly selective in its admission process. Every year, the school receives over 3000 applications from Hanoi and other Northern Vietnamese provinces to Thanh Hoa, out of which only 500 to 600 would be admitted.

For the 2023–2024 school year, the overall admission rate into specialized classes of Chu Van An High School was 10.9%. Applicants are required to take an entrance exam conducted by the Hanoi Department of Education and Training. This examination usually takes place around mid-June with three subjects, Mathematics, Literature and English, and one additional subject for students who sought admission in specialized classes.

Applicants who wish to enroll in the dual degree programme must, in addition to the standard entrance exam, also sit for additional subject tests in English—namely Mathematics, Physics, Chemistry, and English (including Speaking) as part of the admission requirements for the dual degree classes.

== Class system ==
=== Legacy class streams (before 2025) ===
Until the academic year of 2007/2008, Chu Van An High School had over 2.000 students from Grade 10 to Grade 12. In the same academic year, Chu Van An High School became the first school in Hanoi to have a Japanese language class, with the help of the Ministry of Education and Training and the Embassy of Japan in Vietnam.

The class system of the 117th cohort currently includes 16 subject-focused classes of 11 subjects: Mathematics, Physics, Chemistry, Japanese, French, IT, Biology (2 classes), Literature (2 classes), History (2 classes), Geography (2 classes), English (2 classes); two dual degree classes (I1, I2); one French bilingual class which is sponsored and trained by staffs from the Association of Francophone Universities; and five normal classes divided into two groups which represent for the Vietnamese college entrance exam blocks: Group A (A1, A2, A3) and Group D (D1, D2).

=== Current framework (after 2025) ===
From the 118th cohort (2025–2028), Chu Van An High School for the Gifted has abolished the traditional normal class system and ceased admitting any students into such classes. In addition, the school ended admissions for its French bilingual programme, and following the Hanoi Department of Education and Training's plans of phasing out the dual diploma programme after seven years of implementation, they have also discontinued enrollment for that track.

At present, the 118th cohort now contains 19 specialised (or major) classes of 13 subjects: Mathematics, Physics, Chemistry, Japanese, Chinese, Korean, IT, English (2 classes), French (2 classes), History (2 classes), Geography (2 classes) and Biology (2 classes).

== Campus ==
Chu Van An High School for the Gifted is currently situated on a single campus, located adjacent to West Lake, paralleled between Nguyễn Đình Thi Road and Thụy Khuê Street. This campus has served as the school's principal location since 1908, with the exception of periods of wartime displacement. Several original buildings remain intact, having been preserved since the school's early years.

Currently, the school is undergoing a major renovation, with the old auditorium, S and T buildings, and several other facilities being demolished and replaced.

=== Academic facilities ===
- Seven academic buildings (A, B, C, D, E, T and S).
- A subject-specific building
- Auditorium

=== Athletic facilities ===
- Three mini (5v5 - 7v7) association football fields.
- Two outdoor basketball courts.
- A tennis court.
- A gymnastics hall.
- A swimming pool.

=== Miscellaneous ===
- The Octagon House (currently a library).
- The traditional house.
- A dormitory (K Building).
- A statue of Chu Văn An and a bust of Đặng Thùy Trâm.
- The teachers' office.

== Awards and recognition ==
From teaching and training achievements throughout the school's existence, the Government of Vietnam has awarded the school with:

- Labor Order 3rd class: 1964
- Labor Order 2nd class: 1992
- Order of Independence 1st class: 1998
- Hero of Labor: 2013

== Notable alumni and teachers ==
Teachers

- Hoàng Xuân Hãn, Minister – Ministry of Education under the regime of Trần Trọng Kim
- Nguyễn Văn Huyên, Minister – Ministry of Education, North Vietnam for 29 years
- Võ Nguyên Giáp, Minister – Minister of Defence (Vietnam) & Deputy Prime Minister of Vietnam
- Tô Ngọc Vân

Alumni

Politics and military

- Lê Hồng Phong, the second general secretary of the Communist Party of Vietnam
- Nguyễn Văn Cừ, the fourth general secretary of the Communist Party of Vietnam
- Phạm Văn Đồng, the first prime minister of North Vietnam and united Vietnam
- Trịnh Đình Cửu, general secretary of the former Communist Party of Vietnam
- Nguyễn Cao Kỳ, former vice president and prime minister of South Vietnam
- Ngô Gia Tự, (Class of 1922), general secretary of Communist Party of Vietnam in South Vietnam
- Dương Đức Hiền, the first general secretary of Democratic Party of Vietnam
- Kaysone Phomvihane, former leader of the Lao People's Revolutionary Party
- Prince Souphanouvong, the first president of Laos
- Lê Trọng Tấn, Army General and Chief of General Staff of Vietnamese Army
- Nguyễn Tường Tam (Nhất Linh), novelist, Minister – Ministry of Foreign Affairs
- Nguyễn Cơ Thạch, Minister- Ministry of Foreign Affairs
- Nguyễn Chí Dũng, Minister- Ministry of Planning & Investment (Vietnam)
- Phan Anh, lawyer, Minister – Ministry of Defence
- Vương Văn Bắc, Minister – Ministry of Foreign Affairs, South Vietnam
- Nguyễn Khoa Điềm, Minister – Ministry of Culture, Sports and Tourism
- Nguyễn Phương Nga, Deputy Minister – Ministry of Foreign Affairs
- Đặng Vũ Hiệp (Class of 1941), Deputy Minister – Ministry of Defence

Science & Education

- Tôn Thất Tùng, Anatomist, Deputy Minister – Ministry of Health, Director of Vietnam – Germany Hospital or Bệnh viện Việt Đức
- Tạ Quang Bửu (Class of 1926), mathematician, Minister – Ministry of Education
- Lê Văn Thiêm (Class of 1936), mathematician, Director – Institute of Mathematical Science
- Nguỵ Như Kon Tum, Physician, First Principal of Vietnam National University
- Van H. Vu – Mathematician
- Nguyễn Văn Chiển (Class of 1934), geologist, author of (Atlas) Vietnam.
- Nguyễn Đình Ngọc, Secret Intelligence Officer, Vice President -The Radio and Electronics Association of Vietnam (EAV)
- Dương Trung Quốc, historian, General Secretary – Historical Science Association of Vietnam, Congressman
- Trần Đức Thảo, philosopher
- Lê Văn Lan, historian, Founder and President of Institute of Historical Studies
- Nguyễn Khắc Viện (Class of 1932)

Culture

- Nguyễn Đình Thi (Class of 1941), poet, General Secretary – Vietnam Writers' Association
- Ngô Xuân Diệu, poet
- Bùi Văn Bảo (Class of 1940), poet
- Hồ Trọng Hiếu (Tú Mỡ) (Class of 1915), poet
- Nguyễn Công Hoan (Class of 1920), Novelist.
- Nam Trân (Class of 1924), poet
- Vũ Khắc Khoan, novelist
- Nguyễn Hiến Lê (Class of 1926)
- Dương Bích Liên, Painter – Member of the Sáng – Nghiêm – Liên – Phái
- Tô Ngọc Vân, Painter – Member of the Trí – Vân – Lân – Cẩn
- Vũ Đình Liên (Class of 1930), poet
- Vương Trí Nhàn (Class of 1958), Literary Critics
- Võ An Ninh, photographer
- Hoàng Ngọc Phách (Class of 1914), novelist
- Nguyễn Tường Tam (Nhất Linh), novelist, Minister – Ministry of Foreign Affairs
- Trần Tiến, actor, People's Artist Award
- Thanh Tùng, musician

== Former principals ==
Time	Principal	Notes
1914–1918	Muss	
1925–1926	Lombriger	
1936–1939	Léon Autigeon	
1940–1945	Perruca	
1944–1945	Dizes	Director of the campus which fled to Phú Nhạc
6/1945-8/1945	Nguyễn Gia Tường	First Vietnamese principal
8/1945-9/1945	Dương Quảng Hàm	First Vietnamese principal appointed by Viet Minh
1948–1951	Phạm Xuân Độ	Principal of Chu Van An in French-occupied Hanoi.
1951–1953	Vũ Ngô Xán	Principal of Chu Van An in French-occupied Hanoi.
1953–1954	Mai Phương	Principal of Chu Van An in French-occupied Hanoi.
1945–1954	Trần Văn Khang	Principal of Chu Van An in Dao Gia, governed by Viet Minh
1954–1958	Phạm Quang Hiếu	
1958–1965	Hoàng Hùng	
1965–1968	Hoàng Xuân Hoài	
1985–1990	Nguyễn Đức Lưu	
1984–1990	Vũ Thái Bình	
1990–1993	Trần Thúy Lan	
1993–1997	Phạm Đình Đậu	
1997–2008	Đinh Sĩ Đại	
2008–2014	Chử Xuân Dũng	
2014–2021	Lê Mai Anh	
2022-now	Nguyễn Thị Nhiếp	
Source: Chu Van An High School's Traditional Room

== See also ==
- High School Graduation Examination (Vietnam)
