= Temple of Literature, Hanoi =

Temple dedicated to Confucius

Coordinates: 21°1′43″N 105°50′8″E

Temple of Confucius
- Văn Miếu
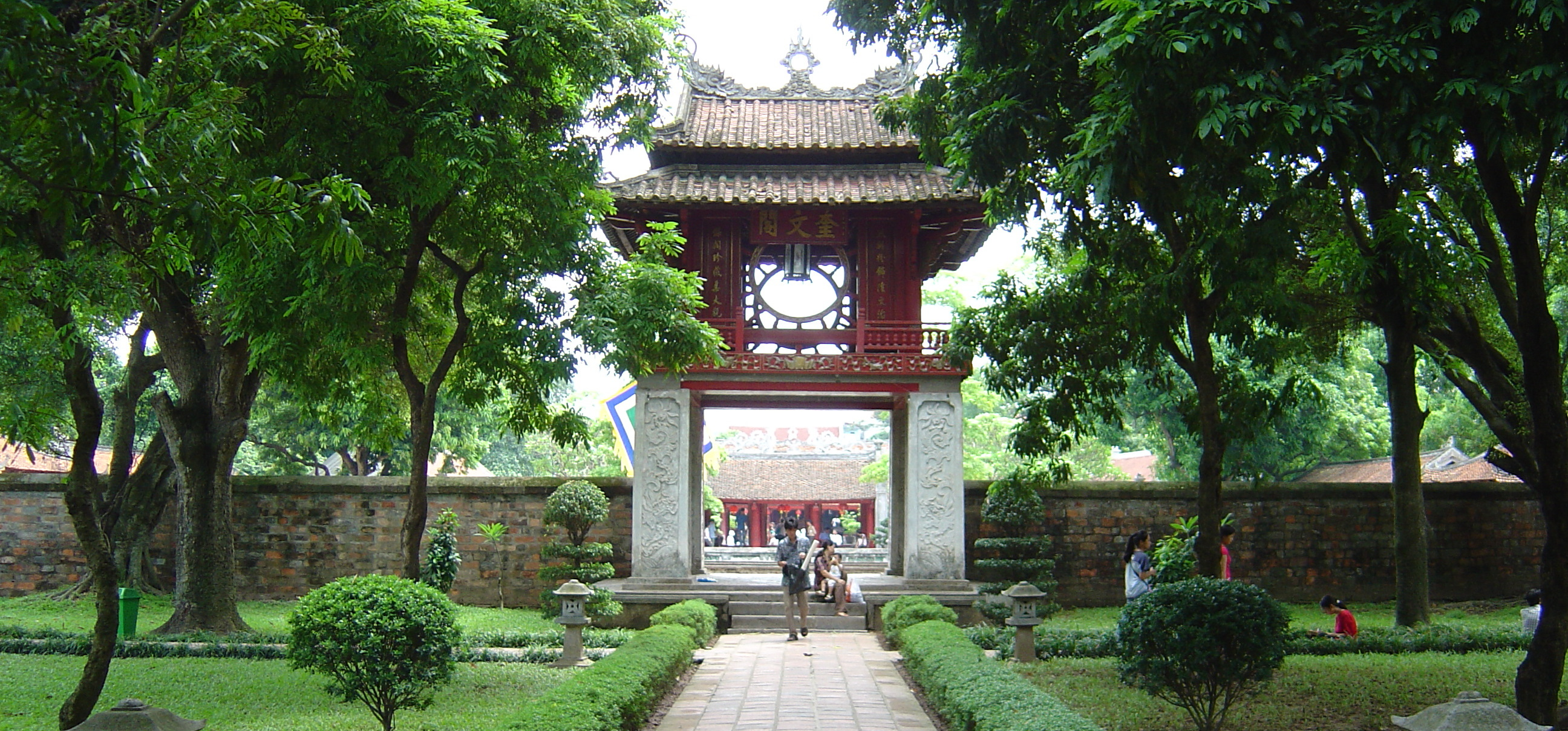
- Khuê Văn Các was built in 1805 and is a symbol of Hanoi.

Religion
- Affiliation: Ruism

Location
- Location: No.58, Quốc Tử Giám Street, Văn Miếu Quốc Tử Giám Ward, Hanoi
- Interactive map of Temple of Confucius

Architecture
- Established: 1070; 956 years ago

Website
- vanmieu.gov.vn

Văn Miếu (Vietnamese: Văn Miếu, [vɐn˧ miew˧˥], chữ Hán: 文廟), literally translated as Temple of Literature, is a temple dedicated to Confucius in Hanoi, northern Vietnam. The temple was founded and first built in 1070 at the time of Emperor Lý Thánh Tông, and it hosted the Imperial Academy (Quốc Tử Giám, 國子監), Vietnam's first national university, from 1076 to 1779. In 1803, The academy was moved to the new capital of Nguyen dynasty in Hue.

The Văn Miếu is one of several temples in Vietnam which are dedicated to Confucius, sages, and scholars. The temple is located to the south of the Imperial Citadel of Thăng Long. The various pavilions, halls, statues, and stelae of doctors are places where offering ceremonies, study sessions, and the strict exams of the Đại Việt took place. The temple is featured on the back of the 100,000 Vietnamese đồng banknote. Just before the Tết Vietnamese New Year celebration, calligraphists will assemble outside the temple and write wishes in Chữ Hán. The art works are given away as gifts or are used as home decorations for special occasions.

== History ==
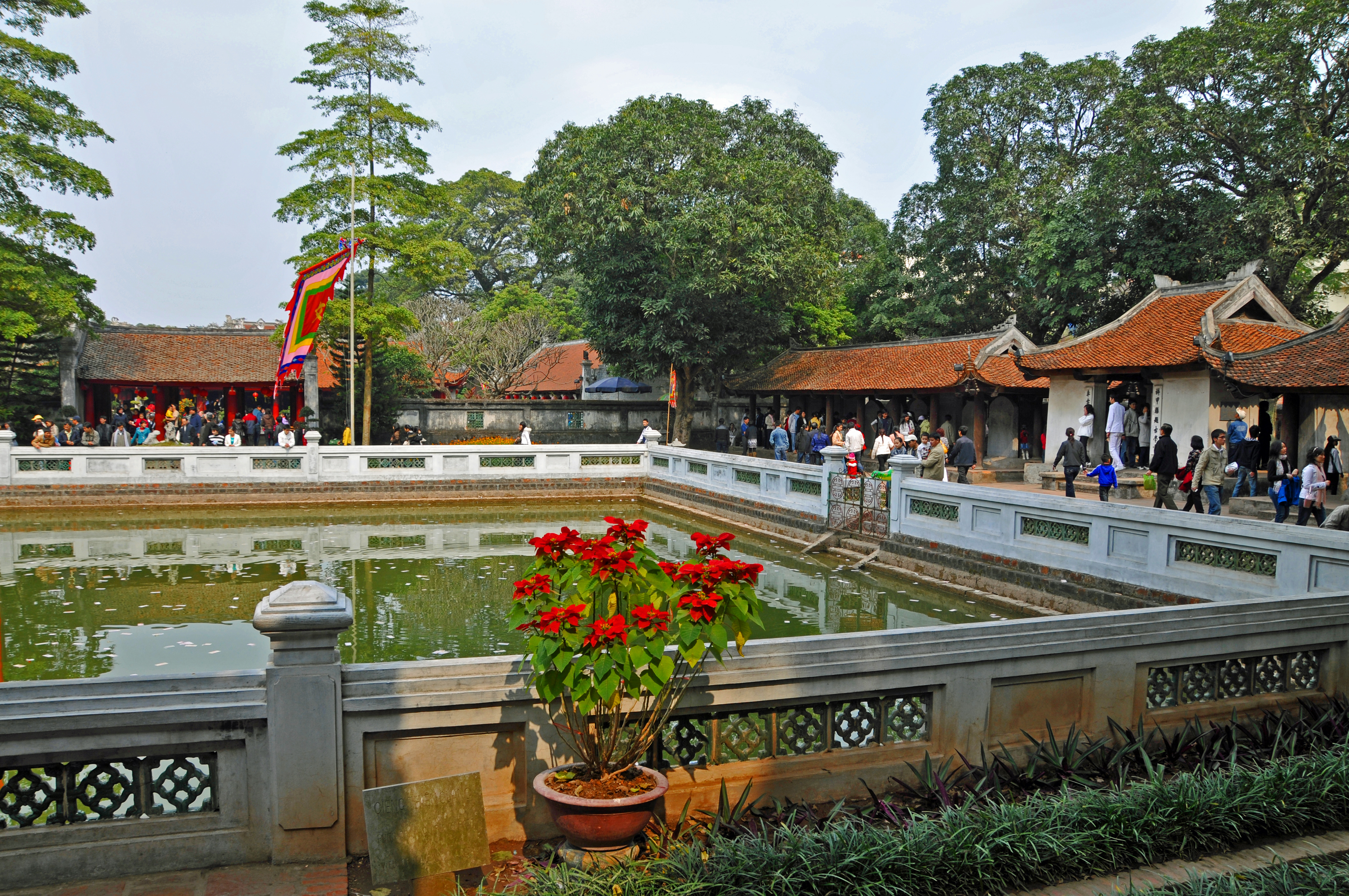
Thiên Quang ("Heaven Light") Well, also known as Literature Well

The Văn Miếu was founded and first built in 1070 and was reconstructed during the Trần dynasty (1225–1400) and in the subsequent dynasties. For nearly two centuries, despite wars and disasters, the temple has preserved ancient architectural styles of many dynasties as well as precious relics. Major restorations have taken place in 1920, 1954 and 2000.

"In the autumn of the year Canh Tuất, the second year of Thần Vũ (1070), in the 8th lunar month, during the reign of King Lý Thánh Tông, the Văn Miếu was built. The statues of Confucius, his four best disciples: Yan Hui (Nhan Hồi), Zengzi (Tăng Tử), Zisi (Tử Tư), and Mencius (Mạnh Tử), as well as the Duke of Zhou (Châu Công), were carved and 72 other statues of Confucian scholars were painted. Ceremonies were dedicated to them in each of the four seasons. The Crown Princes studied here."

In 1076, Vietnam's first university, the "Quốc Tử Giám" or Imperial Academy, was established within the temple during the reign of Lý Nhân Tông to educate Vietnam's bureaucrats, nobles, royalty, and other members of the elite. The university remained open from 1076 to 1779. In 1802, the Nguyễn Dynasty's monarchs founded the Huế capital where they established a new imperial academy. The academy at the Hanoi temple lost its prominence and became a school of the Hoài Đức District.

Under the French protectorate, the Văn Miếu - Quốc Tử Giám was registered as a Monument historique in 1906. During the period of 1945–1954, the French demolished parts of the temple to make additional room for the Saint Paul Hospital since hospital capacity was full during times of war. Campaigns of restoration were pursued in 1920 and 1947 under the responsibility of École française d'Extrême-Orient (French School of the Far East).

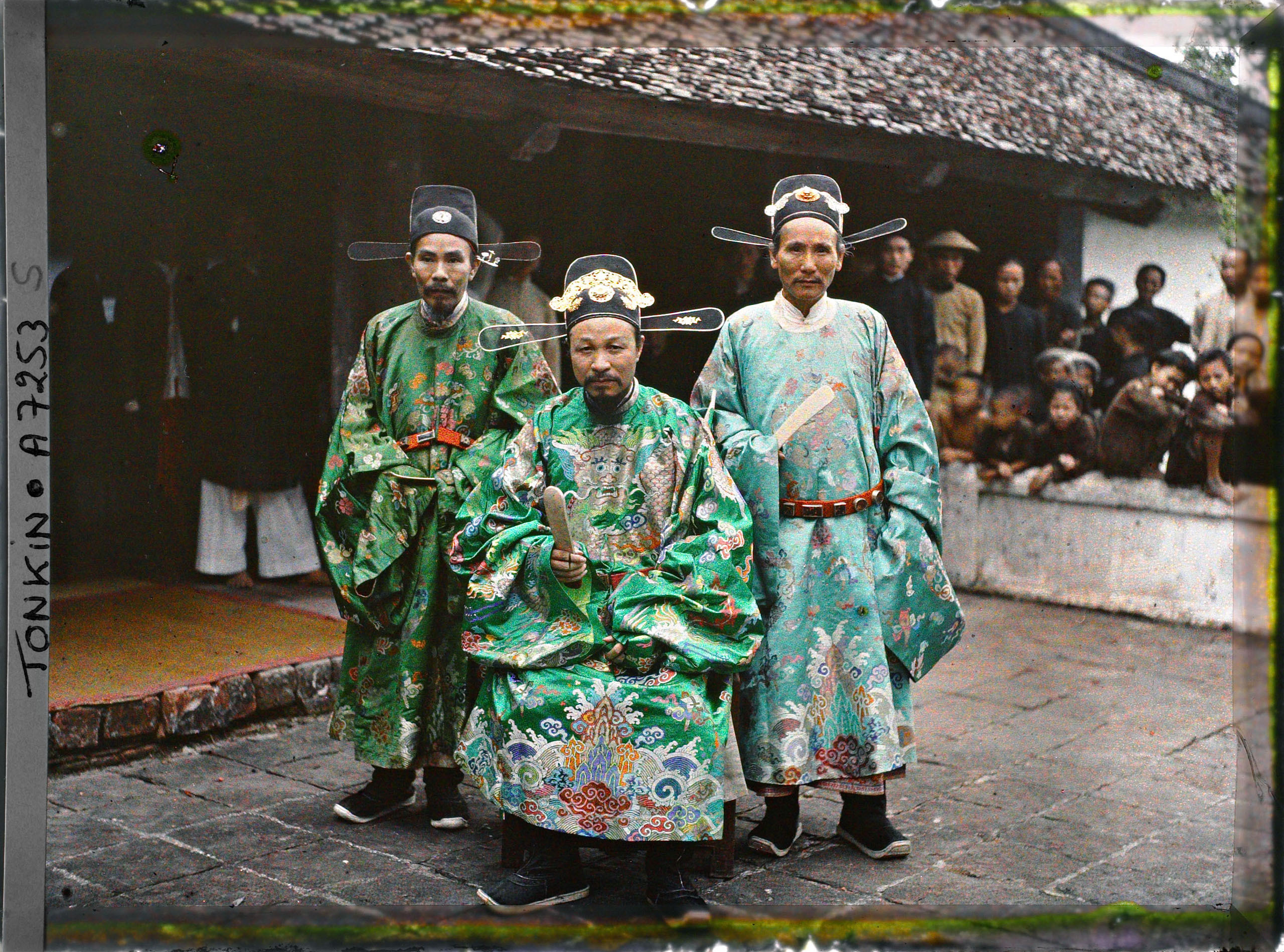
A military mandarin, a provincial chief and a prefect in solemn audience costume at the Văn Miếu temple in 1915, Autochrome by Léon Busy for The Archives of the Planet

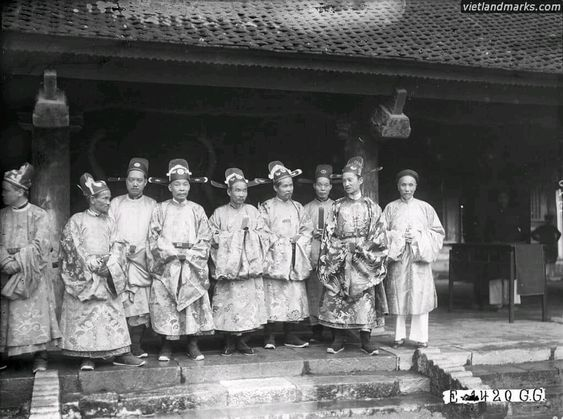
A civil mandarin at the Văn Miếu temple .

== Layout ==
The temple layout is similar to that of the temple at Qufu, Shandong, Confucius' birthplace. It covers an area of over 54,000 square metres (580,000 sq ft), including the Văn lake, Giám park and the interior courtyards which are surrounded by a brick wall. In front of the Great Gate are four tall pillars. On either side of the pillars are two stelae commanding horsemen to dismount.

Map

The gate opens onto three pathways which continues through the complex. The centre path was reserved for the monarch and above the center path there is a big bronze bell, The path to the left is for the administrative Mandarins and the path to the right is for military Mandarins. The interior of the site is divided into five courtyards. The first two courtyards are quiet areas with ancient trees and trimmed lawns, where scholars would relax away from the bustle of the outside world.

The bell located above the main gate was used to signify that an important person was coming through and was added to the Văn Miếu in the 19th century. The bell was made out of Bronze and could only be touched by monks. On the bell several patterns can be found including an outline of a phoenix, which represents beauty, and a dragon, which represents power. Both of these symbols are used to represent the Emperor and Queen. A bell can be found in all of the pagodas in Vietnam.

=== First Courtyard ===
The first courtyard extends from the Great Portico to the Đại Trung, which is flanked by two smaller gates: the Đạt Tài gate and the Thành Đức gate.

=== Second Courtyard ===
The second courtyard is known as the great central courtyard or sometimes the courtyard of great success. It features the Khuê Văn pavilion (奎文閣), a unique architectural work built in 1805 and a symbol of present-day Hanoi. The Khuê Văn pavilion is built on four white-washed stone 67 stilts. At the top is a red-coloured with two circular windows and an elaborate roof. Inside, a bronze bell hangs from the ceiling to be rung on auspicious occasions. Many poetic phrases preserved on the pavilion glorify Vietnamese traditional culture. Beside the Khuê Văn pavilion are the Súc Văn gate and the Bi Văn gate. These two gates are dedicated to the beauty of literature, both its content and its form. In the first and second courtyards there are topiaries (bushes that are cut into particular shapes) that represent the 12 zodiac animals.

=== Third Courtyard ===
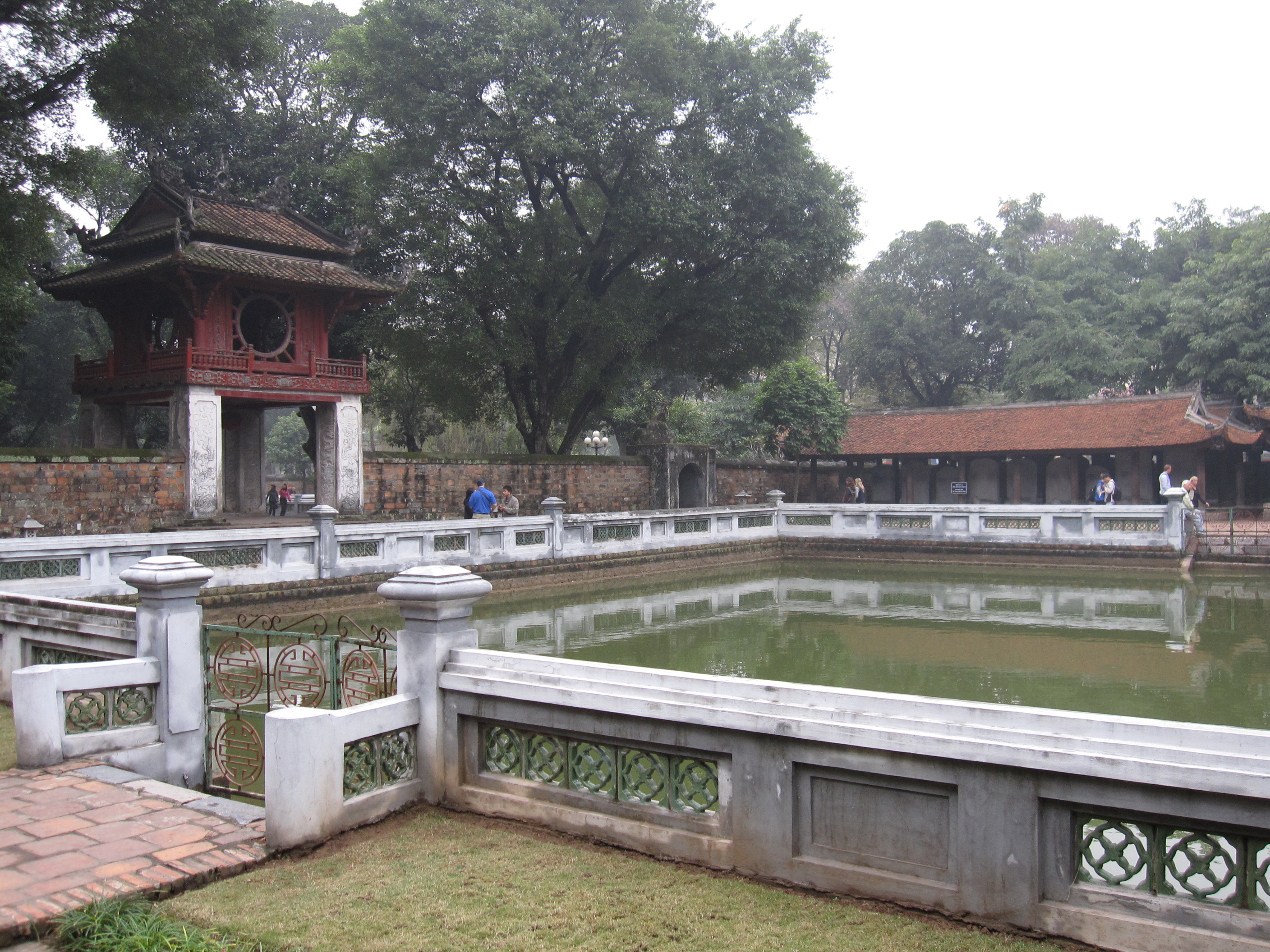
Third Courtyard of the temple with the Thiên Quang well and the red Khuê Văn pavilion

One enters the third courtyard from the Khuê Văn pavilion. In the third courtyard is the Thiên Quang well. On either side of the well stand two great halls which house the treasures of the temple.

=== Doctor's stone tablets ===
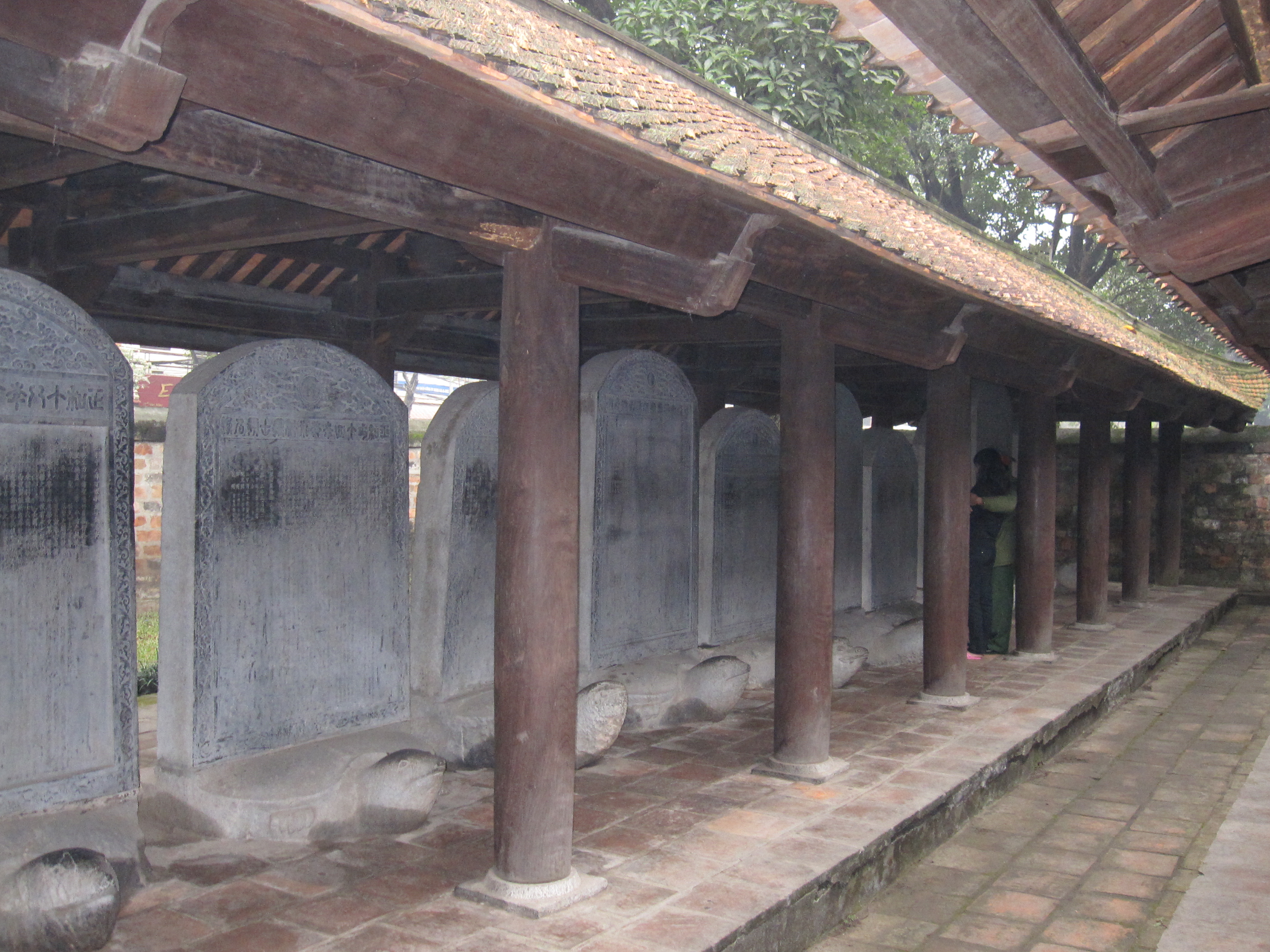
Turtle Steles with the names of those successful at the royal exams

The construction of the stone stelae began in 1484 under the Emperor Lê Thánh Tông. He erected 116 steles of carved blue stone turtles with elaborate motifs to honour talent and encourage study. The Turtle (Quy, 龜) is one of the nation's four holy creatures - the others are the Dragon (Long, 龍), the Unicorn (Lân, 麟) and the Phoenix (Phượng, 鳳). The turtle is a symbol of longevity and wisdom. The shape and size of the turtle changed with the passage of time.

The doctors' steles are a valuable historical resource for the study of culture, education and sculpture in Vietnam. 82 stelae remain. They depict the names and birthplaces of 1307 graduates of 82 triennial royal exams. Between 1442 and 1779, eighty-one exams were held by the Lê dynasty and one was held by the Mạc dynasty. The ancient Chinese engravings on each stele praise the merits of the monarch and cite the reason for holding royal exams. They also record the mandarins who were tasked with organising the exams. It used to be common to rub the stone turtles' heads, but now there is a fence that is meant to prevent people from doing this in order to preserve the turtles.

They are a valuable historical resource for the study of philosophy history, culture, education, society and sculpture in Vietnam. The stelae were inscribed on UNESCO's Memory of the World Register in 2011.

=== Fourth Courtyard ===
One enters the fourth courtyard through the Đại Thành gate. On either side are two smaller gates: Kim Thanh gate and the Ngọc Chấn gate. This courtyard is the ceremonial heart of the complex.

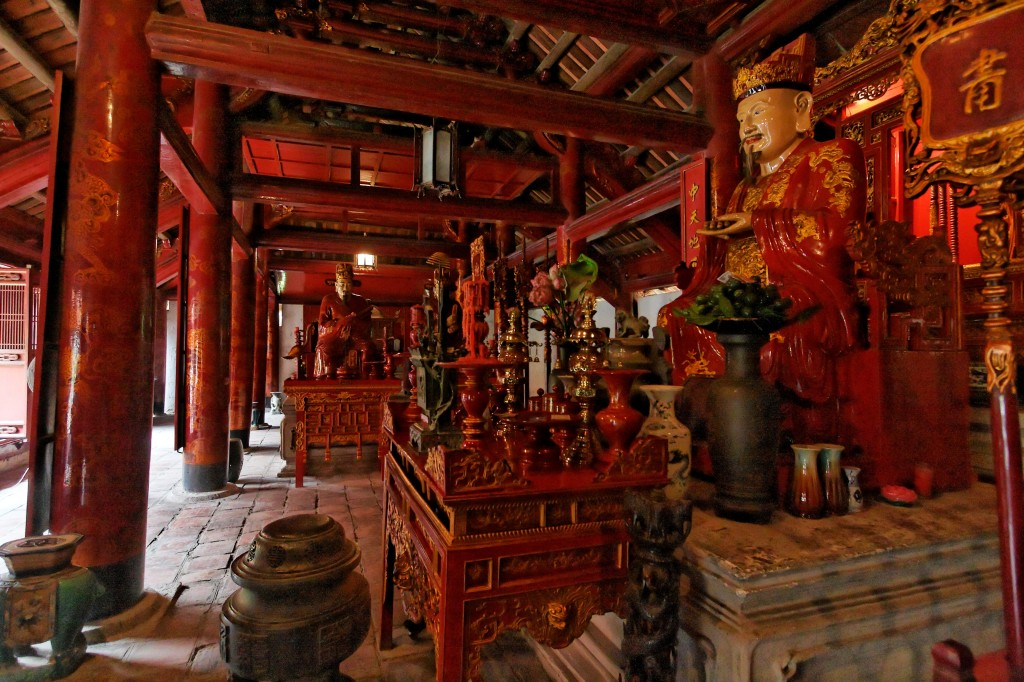
Altars to Confucius and his disciples

On each side of the ceremonial fourth courtyard stand two halls. Their original purpose was to house altars to the seventy-two most honoured disciples of Confucius and Chu Văn An (a rector of the Imperial Academy). In the centre of the fourth courtyard is the House of Ceremonies (Đại Bái Đường). The next building is the Thượng Điện, where Confucius and his four closest disciples Yanhui, Zengshen, Zisi and Mencius are worshipped. The sanctuary also hosts altars to ten honoured philosophers. These pavilions reflect the style of the early 19th century. A small museum displays ink wells, pens, books and personal artefacts belonging to some of the students that studied at the temple.

=== Fifth Courtyard ===
In 1077, Emperor Lý Nhân Tông ordered the construction of an imperial academy as a fifth courtyard. Literate mandarins were selected as students. In 1236, the academy was enlarged and named Quốc Tử Viện and later Quốc Học Viện. In the Lê dynasty it was called Thái Học Viện and was developed further. This development included the Minh Luân house, west and east classrooms, a storehouse for wooden printing blocks and two sets of three 25 room dormitories. The Khải Thánh shrine was built to honour the parents of Confucius. In 1946, the courtyard was destroyed during the First Indochina War. In the year 2000, the fifth courtyard was reconstructed on grounds of the original "Imperial Academy". It honours the talents, the national traditions and the culture and education of Vietnam. The design of the new fifth courtyard were based on the traditional architecture in harmony with the surrounding sights of the temple. Several buildings were constructed including the front building, the rear building, the left and right buildings, a bell house and a drum house. The Thái Học courtyard occupies 1530 sq.m. of the temple's total area of 6150 sq.m. The front building has a number of functions. Ceremonies in memory of cultural scholars are organised from the front building as are scientific activities and cultural events. The rear building has two levels. The ground floor has a statue of Chu Văn An (a rector of the academy) and shows exhibits of the temple and the academy with a display on Confucian education in Vietnam.

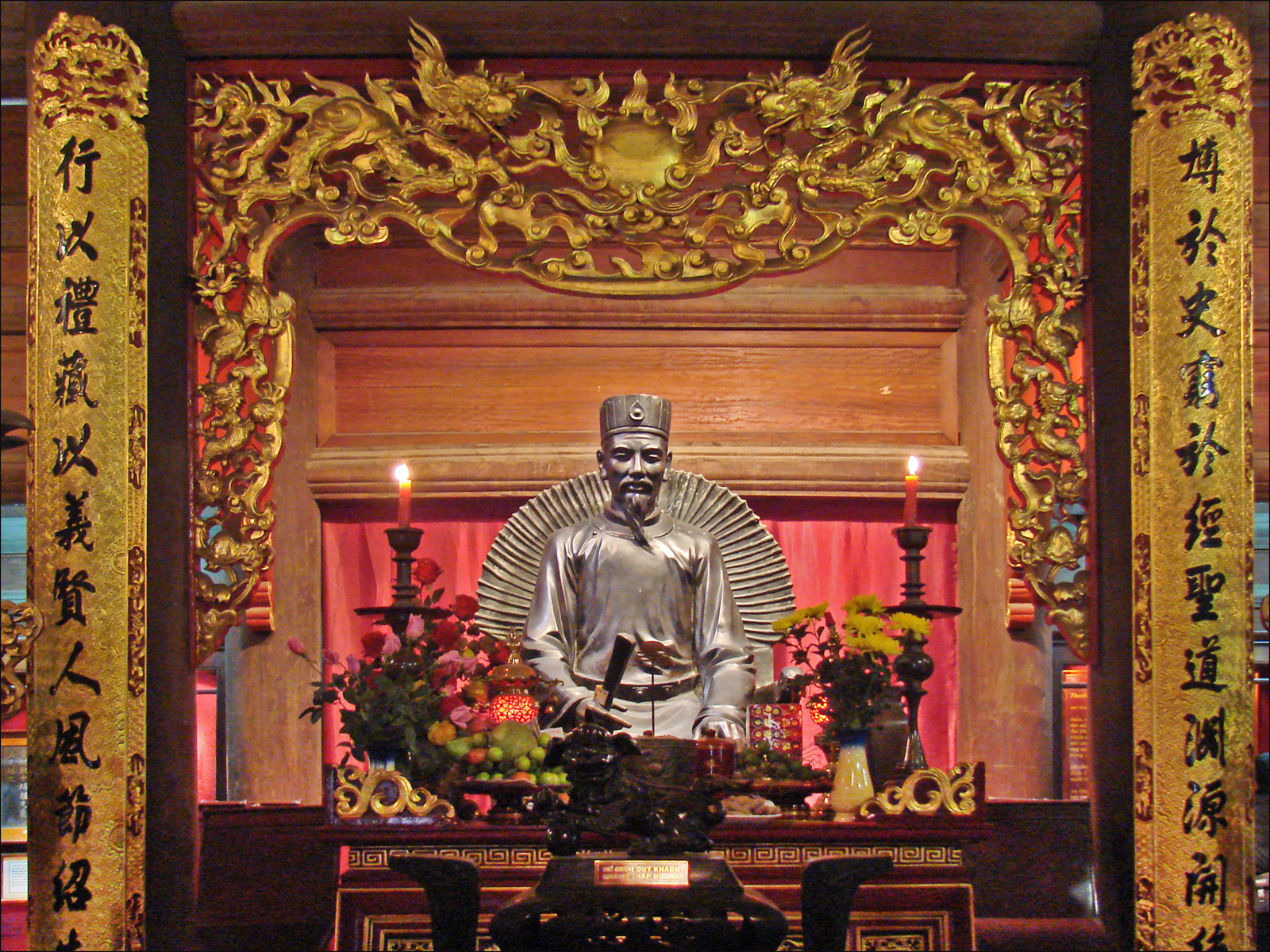
Altar to Chu Văn An, rector of the imperial academy

The upper floor is dedicated to the three monarchs who contributed most to the foundation of the temple and the academy: Lý Thánh Tông (1023–1072), who founded the temple in 1070, Lý Nhân Tông (1066–1127), who founded the Imperial Academy, and Lê Thánh Tông (1442–1497), who ordered the erection of the turtle stone stelae of doctor laureates in 1484.

On either side of the rear building are square buildings which hold a drum and a bronze bell. The drum is 2.01 metres (6 ft 7 in) wide, 2.65 metres (8 ft 8 in) high, has a volume of 10 m^{3} and weighs 700 kilograms (1,500 lb). The bell was cast in 2000, with dimensions of 2.1 by 0.99 metres (6 ft 11 in by 3 ft 3 in).

== Study at the Imperial Academy ==
The organization of instruction and learning at the Imperial Academy began in 1076 under the Lý dynasty and was further developed in the 15th century under the Le dynasty. The academy was headed by a rector (Tế tửu) and a vice-rector (Tư nghiệp). The professors of the academy held different titles: Giáo thụ, Trực giảng, Trợ giáo and Bác sĩ.

Many students lived and studied at the Temple. Most students (Giám sinh) had passed the regional exam (Hương Examination - Thi Hương) before enrolling at the academy. During the course of study at the academy, the students focused on discussion of literature and wrote poetry as well. The students learned Chinese, Chinese philosophy, and Chinese history. They had textbooks printed on paper which were in both Chinese and Vietnamese. They read The Four Books (Tứ thư, 四書): "The Great Learning" (Đại Học, 大學), "Doctrine of the Mean" (Trung Dung, 中庸), "The Analects" (Luận Ngữ, 論語) and "Mencius" (Mạnh Tử, 孟子); Five Pre-Confucian Classics (Ngũ Kinh, 五經): "Classic of Poetry (Kinh Thi, 經詩), "Book of Documents" (Kinh Thư, 經書), "Book of Rites" (Kinh Lễ, 經禮), "Book of Change" (Kinh Dịch, 經易) and "Spring and Autumn Annals" (Kinh Xuân Thu, 經春秋); ancient poetry and Chinese history among others.

The students enrolled for three to seven years. They had minor tests each month and four major tests per year. Success in the exams, certified by the Ministry of Rites (Bộ Lễ, 部禮) qualified them to sit the national exam (Hội Examination - Thi Hội). Success at the Hội Examination qualified the student to sit the royal exam, the Đình Examination (Thi Đình), held at court. At this exam, the monarch himself posed the questions, responded to the candidate's answer and then ranked those who passed into different grades. The Imperial Academy was the largest centre in the country.

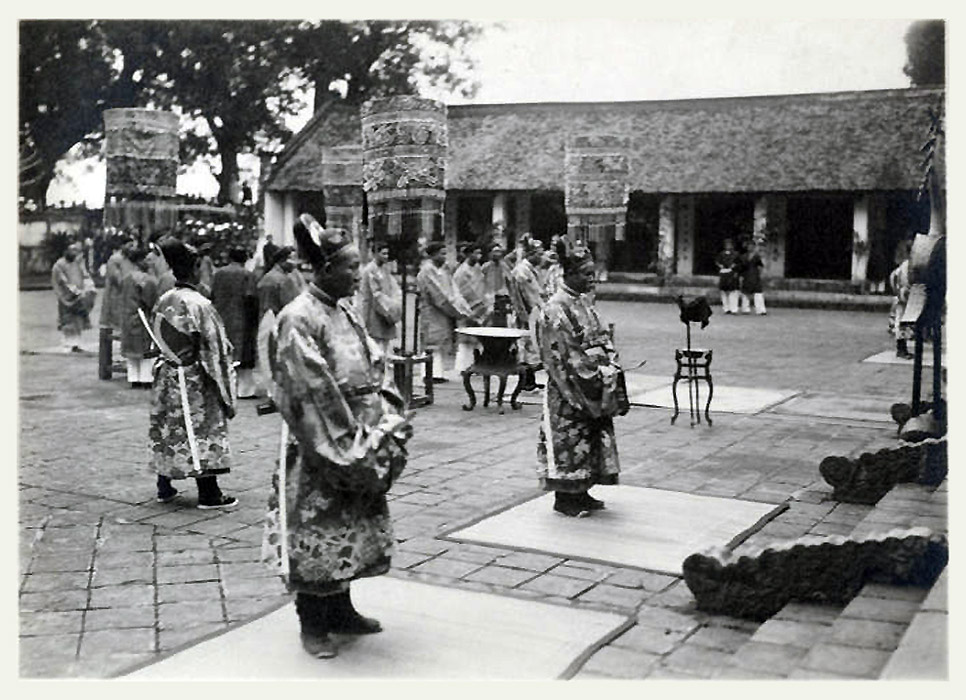
Mandarin at Văn Miếu, performing a ritual.

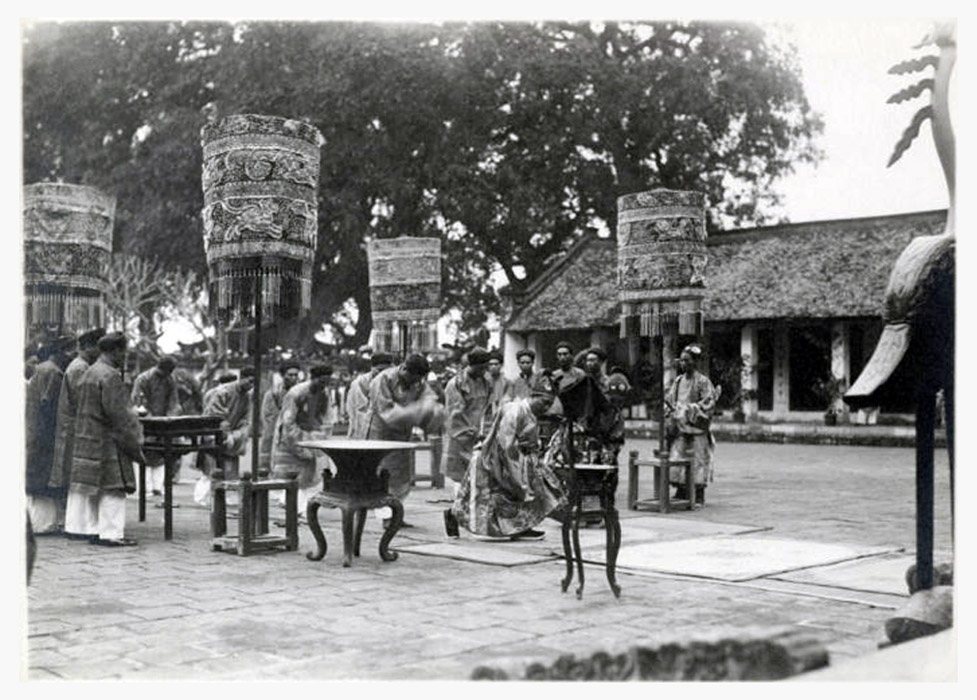
Mandarin at Văn Miếu, performing a ritual.

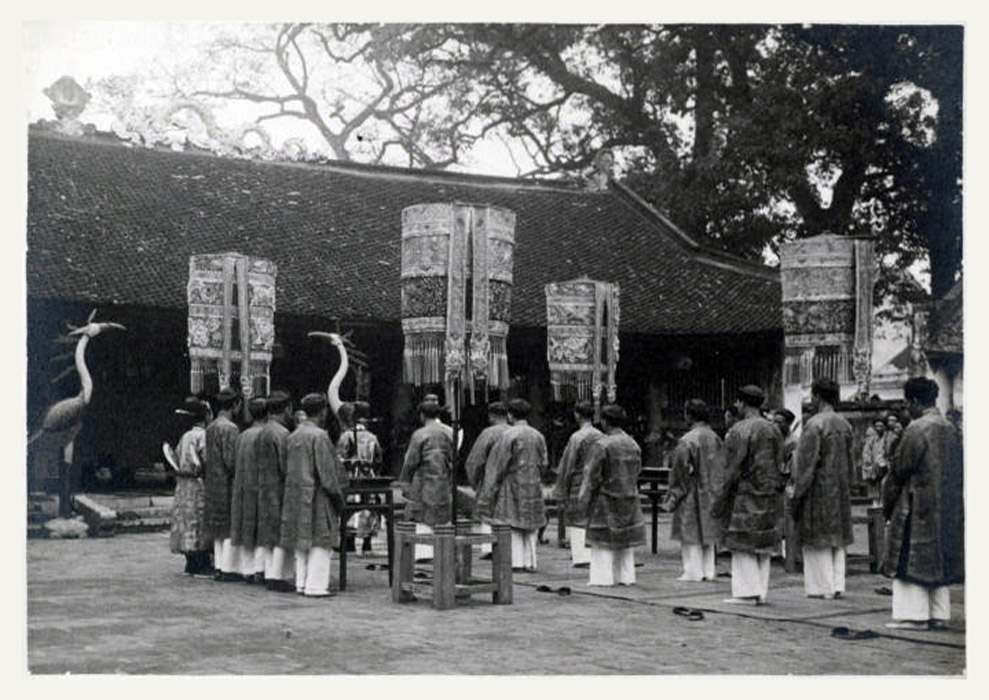
Mandarin at Văn Miếu, performing a ritual.

== Popular culture ==
- The temple was featured in the 5th leg of The Amazing Race 22.

== Gallery ==
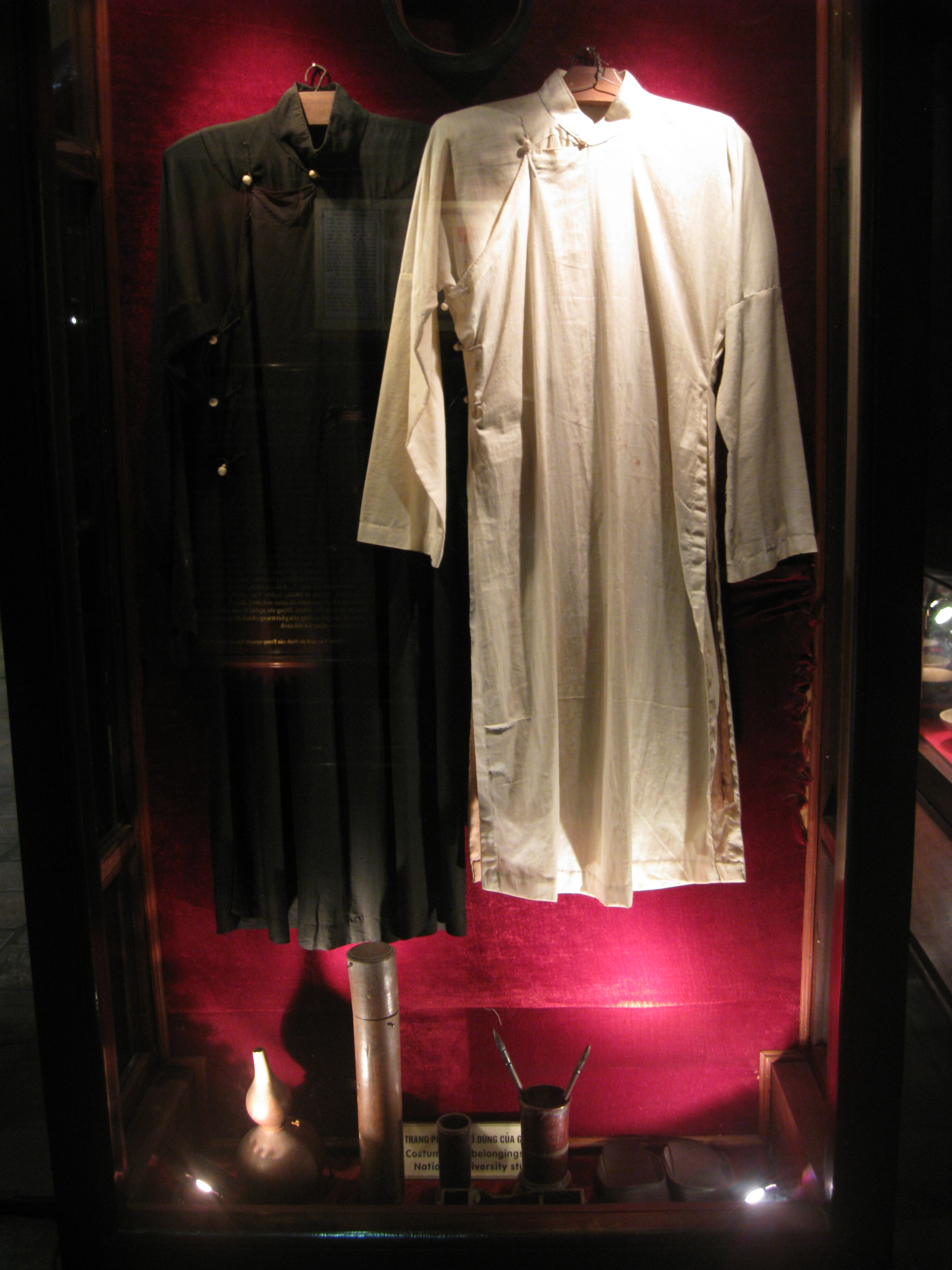
Uniforms of students of the imperial academy

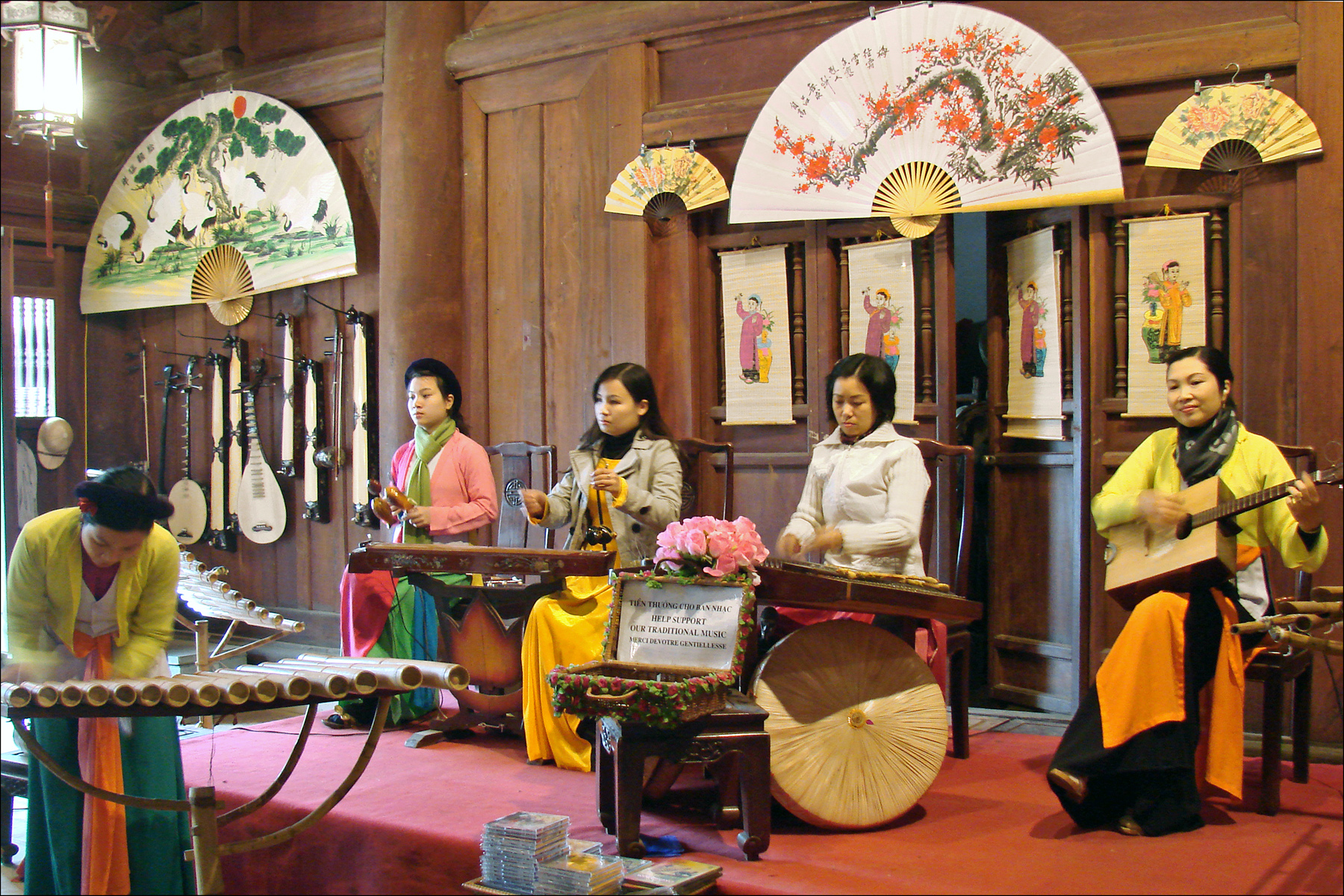
Orchestra performing traditional music in honour of the royal founders and Confucius

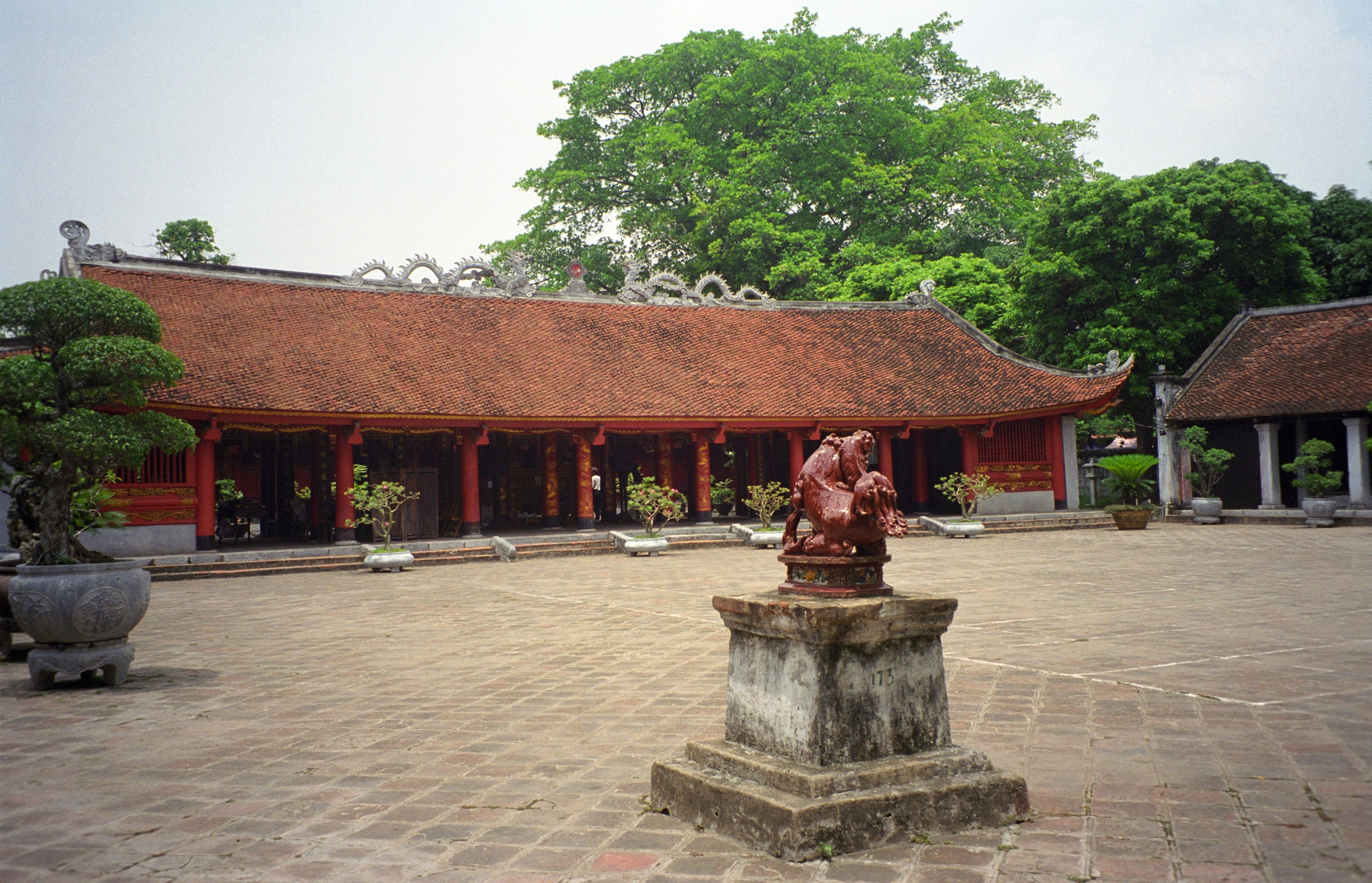
Fourth Courtyard

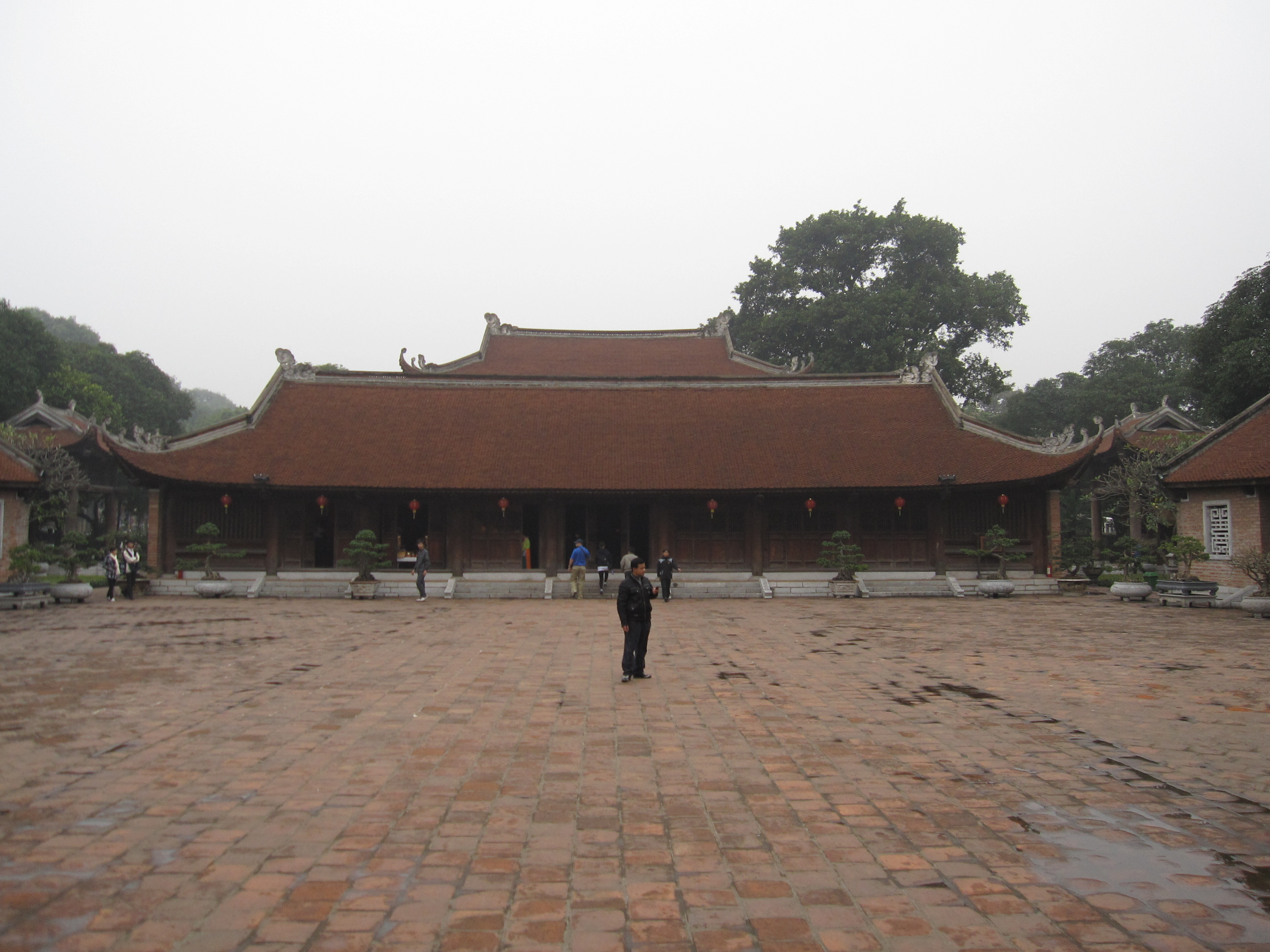
Fifth Courtyard, grounds of the imperial academy

== See also ==
- Confucian examination system in Vietnam
- Trấn Biên Temple of Literature in Đồng Nai, Vietnam
- Literary Hanese in Vietnam
