= Government of Phạm Minh Chính =

Government of Vietnam from 2021 to 2026

Government of the 15th National Assembly
- 43rd (or 15th) cabinet of Vietnam
- 2021–2026
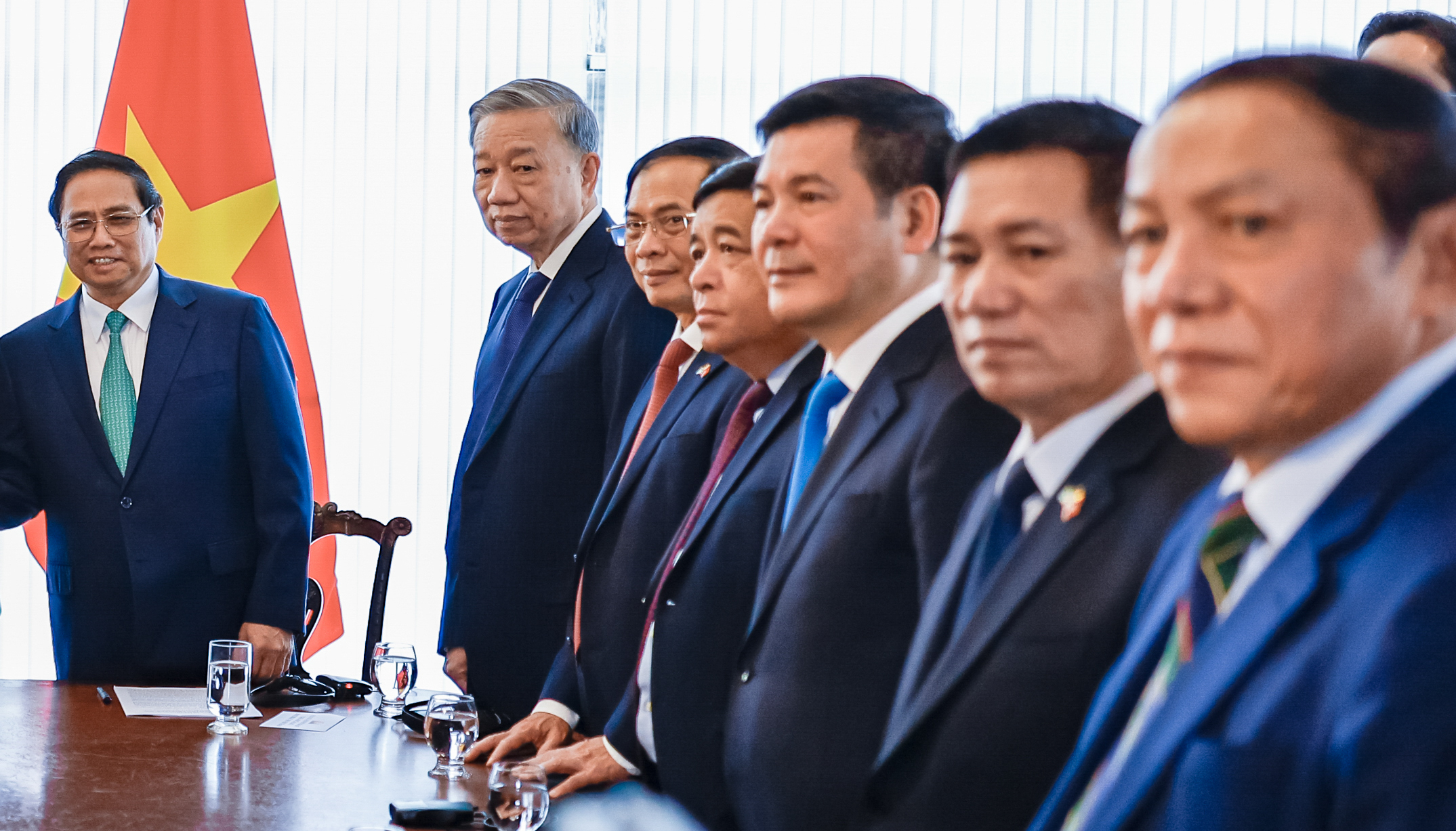
- Chính (left) and his cabinet's top ministers in 2023
- Date formed: 5 April 2021
- Date dissolved: 7 April 2026

People and organisations
- General Secretary: Nguyễn Phú Trọng (2011–24) (Note: Died in office); Tô Lâm (2024–)
- President: List: Nguyễn Xuân Phúc (2021–23); Võ Thị Ánh Xuân (acting; 2023); Võ Văn Thưởng (2023–24); Võ Thị Ánh Xuân (acting; 2024); Tô Lâm (2024); Lương Cường (2024–26)
- Prime Minister: Phạm Minh Chính
- Permanent Deputy Prime Minister: List: Trương Hòa Bình (2016–21); Phạm Bình Minh (2021–23); Nguyễn Hòa Bình (2024–26)
- Deputy Prime Ministers: List: Vũ Đức Đam (2013–23); Lê Minh Khái (2021–24); Lê Văn Thành (2021–23); Trần Lưu Quang (2023–24); Trần Hồng Hà (2023–26); Lê Thành Long (2024–26); Hồ Đức Phớc (2024–26); Bùi Thanh Sơn (2024–26); Nguyễn Chí Dũng (2025–26); Mai Văn Chính (2025–26); Phạm Thị Thanh Trà (2025–); Hồ Quốc Dũng (2025–)
- No. of ministers: 34 (Note: Number of individuals who served in the Cabinet, including those whose ministries were dissolved in February 2025.)
- Ministers removed: 6 dismissed 8 left for other reasons
- Member party: Communist Party of Vietnam
- Status in legislature: One-party state

History
- Incoming formation: 11th working session of the 14th National Assembly
- Outgoing election: 2026 legislative election
- Legislature terms: 14th National Assembly (until May 2021); 15th National Assembly (from May 2021)
- Predecessor: Government of Nguyễn Xuân Phúc
- Successor: Government of Lê Minh Hưng

The Government of Phạm Minh Chính, officially the Government of the 15th National Assembly (Chính phủ nhiệm kỳ Quốc hội khóa XV) was the 43rd Government of Vietnam.

The government was led by Prime Minister Phạm Minh Chính, who was elected at the 11th working session of the 14th National Assembly term on 5 April 2021. Chính became the first Prime Minister since the Đổi Mới era to become Prime Minister without having previously served as Deputy Prime Minister or in any previous government cabinets. He was re-elected to serve during the 15th National Assembly term.

Chính did not seek re-election to the 14th Party Central Committee in January 2026 and, thus, could not continue as Prime Minister. On the afternoon of 7 April 2026, the 16th National Assembly elected Lê Minh Hưng as Prime Minister, ending the term of the Phạm Minh Chính government.

== Background ==
On 2 April 2021, while the 14th National Assembly of Vietnam was in session, the body voted to relieve Nguyễn Phú Trọng's presidency with 91.25% of the vote. Trọng remained as the paramount leader of Vietnam as General Secretary. On 5 April, the National Assembly elected then-Prime Minister and sole candidate Nguyễn Xuân Phúc as the 11th President, and Chính, then-Head of the Central Organisation Commission, was elected Prime Minister with 96.25% of the votes from the members. On 8 April, the National Assembly approved the appointment of two Deputy Prime Ministers and twelve other members of the Government.

Later that year, on 23 May, legislative elections were held nationwide to elect the 500 members of the National Assembly with a voter turnout rate that exceeded 99%. At the first session of the 15th National Assembly on 28 July, Chính was unanimously re-elected by the body to hold the position of Prime Minister for the 2021–2026 term along with all 27 of his cabinet members.

== Cabinet ==
=== Prime Minister and Deputy Prime Ministers ===
The Government was headed by a prime minister (Thủ tướng Chính phủ) and deputy prime ministers (Phó Thủ tướng Chính phủ), one of whom was designated as the permanent deputy prime minister (Phó Thủ tướng thường trực). Each deputy prime minister was responsible for one particular field of the administration.

Prime Minister and Deputy Prime Ministers of the 15th Government
Office	Officeholder		Took office	Left office	Ref
Office	Portrait	Name	Took office	Left office	Ref
Prime Minister		Phạm Minh Chính	5 April 2021	7 April 2026	
Permanent Deputy Prime Minister		Trương Hòa Bình	16 August 2016 (Note: Bình became a deputy prime minister on 9 April 2016, then became the permanent deputy prime minister on 16 August.)	28 July 2021	
Permanent Deputy Prime Minister		Phạm Bình Minh	28 July 2021 (Note: Minh became a deputy prime minister on 13 November 2013, then became the permanent deputy prime minister on 28 July 2021.)	5 January 2023	
Permanent Deputy Prime Minister	Vacant				
Permanent Deputy Prime Minister		Nguyễn Hòa Bình	28 August 2024 (Note: Bình became a deputy prime minister on 26 August 2024, then became the permanent deputy prime minister two days later.)	8 April 2026	
Deputy Prime Ministers		Vũ Đức Đam	13 November 2013	5 January 2023	
Deputy Prime Ministers		Lê Minh Khái	8 April 2021	26 August 2024	
Deputy Prime Ministers		Lê Văn Thành	8 April 2021	22 August 2023	
Deputy Prime Ministers		Trần Lưu Quang	5 January 2023	26 August 2024	
Deputy Prime Ministers		Trần Hồng Hà	5 January 2023	8 April 2026	
Deputy Prime Ministers		Lê Thành Long	6 June 2024	8 April 2026	
Deputy Prime Ministers		Hồ Đức Phớc	26 August 2024	8 April 2026	
Deputy Prime Ministers		Bùi Thanh Sơn	26 August 2024	8 April 2026	
Deputy Prime Ministers		Nguyễn Chí Dũng	18 February 2025	8 April 2026	
Deputy Prime Ministers		Mai Văn Chính	18 February 2025	8 April 2026	
Deputy Prime Ministers		Phạm Thị Thanh Trà	25 October 2025	Incumbent	
Deputy Prime Ministers		Hồ Quốc Dũng	25 October 2025	Incumbent	

=== Ministerial-level offices ===
There were 14 ministries at the end of the government term; each was headed by a minister (bộ trưởng), and 3 ministry-level agencies; each was headed by a ministerial-level leader (thủ trưởng cơ quan ngang bộ), including:

- Government Office, headed by a chief (chủ nhiệm)
- Government Inspectorate, headed by an inspector-general (tổng thanh tra)
- State Bank of Vietnam, headed by a governor (thống đốc)

Status

Denotes acting minister

Ministerial-level members of the 15th Government
# (Note: As explicitly numbered by Resolution 08/2021/QH15.) (Note: Numberings after the February 2025 institutional reforms.)	Office	Officeholder		Took office	Left office	Ref
#	Office	Portrait	Name	Took office	Left office	Ref
1	Minister of National Defence		General; Phan Văn Giang	8 April 2021	Incumbent	
2	Minister of Public Security		General; Tô Lâm	9 April 2016	22 May 2024	
2	Minister of Public Security	Vacant (Note: Permanent Deputy Minister of Public Security Trần Quốc Tỏ was assigned as "Standing Deputy Minister in charge of the Ministry of Public Security" and served between Tô Lâm's resignation and Lương Tam Quang's appointment. The position is not itself a cabinet position.)				
2	Minister of Public Security		General; Lương Tam Quang	6 June 2024	Incumbent	
3	Minister of Foreign Affairs		Bùi Thanh Sơn	8 April 2021	30 August 2025	
3	Minister of Foreign Affairs		Lê Hoài Trung	30 August 2025	25 October 2025	
3	Minister of Foreign Affairs		Lê Hoài Trung	25 October 2025	Incumbent	
4	Minister of Home Affairs (Note: The Ministry of Labour, Invalids and Social Affairs merged with the Ministry of Home Affairs, including those functions relating to labour issues, workplace safety, social security, and gender equality from, to form the new Ministry of Home Affairs on 18 February 2025.)		Phạm Thị Thanh Trà	8 April 2021	25 October 2025	
4	Minister of Home Affairs		Đỗ Thanh Bình	25 October 2025	21 July 2026	
5	Minister of Justice		Lê Thành Long	9 April 2016	26 August 2024	
5	Minister of Justice		Nguyễn Hải Ninh	26 August 2024	8 April 2026	
6	Minister of Finance (Note: The Ministry of Planning and Instruction merged with the Ministry of Finance, along with the Commission for the Management of State Capital at Enterprises (CMSC), to form the new Ministry of Finance on 18 February 2025.)		Hồ Đức Phớc	8 April 2021	28 November 2024	
6	Minister of Finance		Nguyễn Văn Thắng	28 November 2024	8 April 2026	
7	Minister of Industry and Trade		Nguyễn Hồng Diên	8 April 2021	20 December 2025	
7	Minister of Industry and Trade		Lê Mạnh Hùng	20 December 2025	8 April 2026	
8	Minister of Agriculture and Environment (Note: The Ministry of Natural Resources and Environment merged with the Ministry of Agriculture and Rural Development to form the new Ministry of Agriculture and the Environment on 18 February 2025, which also received functions relating to poverty reduction from the Ministry of Labour, Invalids and Social Affairs.)		Đỗ Đức Duy	18 February 2025	25 October 2025 (Note: Suspended from 17 July – 25 October 2025.)	
8	Minister of Agriculture and Environment		Trần Đức Thắng	17 July 2025	25 October 2025	
8	Minister of Agriculture and Environment		Trần Đức Thắng	25 October 2025	8 April 2026	
9	Minister of Construction (Note: The Ministry of Construction merged with the Ministry of Transportation (except for functions relating to the issuance of driver’s licences, which were transferred to the Ministry of Public Security) to form the new Ministry of Construction on 18 February 2025.)		Nguyễn Thanh Nghị	8 April 2021	18 February 2025	
9	Minister of Construction		Trần Hồng Minh	18 February 2025	Incumbent	
10	Minister of Science and Technology (Note: The Ministry of Information and Communications merged with the Ministry of Science and Technology (except for functions relating to journalism and publishing, which transferred to the Ministry of Culture, Sports and Tourism) to form the new Ministry of Science and Technology on 18 February 2025.)		Huỳnh Thành Đạt	12 November 2020	18 February 2025	
10	Minister of Science and Technology		Nguyễn Mạnh Hùng	18 February 2025	8 April 2026	
11	Minister of Education and Training		Nguyễn Kim Sơn	8 April 2021	27 February 2026	
11	Minister of Education and Training		Hoàng Minh Sơn	27 February 2026	8 April 2026	
12	Minister of Culture, Sports and Tourism		Nguyễn Văn Hùng	8 April 2021	8 April 2026	
13	Minister of Health		Nguyễn Thanh Long	12 November 2020	7 June 2022	
13	Minister of Health	Vacant (Note: Permanent Deputy Minister of Health Đỗ Xuân Tuyên was assigned as "Standing Deputy Minister in charge of the Ministry of Health" and served between Nguyễn Thanh Long's dismissal and Đào Hồng Lan's appointment as Acting Minister. The position is not itself a cabinet position.)				
13	Minister of Health		Đào Hồng Lan	15 July 2022	21 October 2022	
13	Minister of Health		Đào Hồng Lan	21 October 2022	Incumbent	
14	Minister of Ethnic and Religious Affairs (Note: The Committee on Ethnic Minority Affairs received those functions relating to religious affairs from the Ministry of Home Affairs and was renamed the Ministry of Ethnic and Religious Affairs on 18 February 2025.)		Hầu A Lềnh (Note: As Chairman of the Committee on Ethnic Minority Affairs.)	8 April 2021	18 February 2025	
14	Minister of Ethnic and Religious Affairs		Đào Ngọc Dung	18 February 2025	8 April 2026	
15	Governor of the State Bank		Nguyễn Thị Hồng	12 November 2020	6 April 2026	
16	Inspector-General of the Government Inspectorate		Đoàn Hồng Phong	8 April 2021	8 April 2026	
17	Chief of the Government Office		Trần Văn Sơn	8 April 2021	8 April 2026	

=== Former ministrial-level offices ===
Until 18 February 2025, the government included six additional government ministries and one additional ministerial-level committee. At the 9th Extraordinary Session of the 15th National Assembly, the body approved a major restructuring of the government as part of broader institutional reforms. Under the restructuring, four ministries were merged with an existing ministry, one of which combined with a committee, and two ministries were merged to form a new ministry. The new government composition became operative on 1 March 2025.

# (Note: Original numberings before the ministries were dissolved.)	Office	Officeholder		Took office	Left office	Ref
#	Office	Portrait	Name	Took office	Left office	Ref
6	Minister of Planning and Investment		Nguyễn Chí Dũng	9 April 2016	18 February 2025 (ministry dissolved)	
9	Minister of Agriculture and Rural Development		Lê Minh Hoan	8 April 2021	18 February 2025 (ministry dissolved)	
10	Minister of Transport		Nguyễn Văn Thể	26 October 2017	21 October 2022	
10	Minister of Transport		Nguyễn Văn Thắng	21 October 2022	28 November 2024	
10	Minister of Transport		Trần Hồng Minh	28 November 2024	18 February 2025 (ministry dissolved)	
12	Minister of Natural Resources and Environment		Trần Hồng Hà	9 April 2016	22 May 2023	
12	Minister of Natural Resources and Environment		Đặng Quốc Khánh	22 May 2023	26 August 2024	
12	Minister of Natural Resources and Environment		Đỗ Đức Duy	26 August 2024	18 February 2025 (ministry dissolved)	
13	Minister of Information and Communications		Nguyễn Mạnh Hùng	28 October 2018	18 February 2025 (ministry dissolved)	
14	Minister of Labour, Invalids and Social Affairs		Đào Ngọc Dung	9 April 2016	18 February 2025 (ministry dissolved)	

=== Changes ===
- 2021
  - 28 July:
    - At the first session of the 15th National Assembly, Trương Hòa Bình did not seek re-election as Permanent Deputy Prime Minister and subsequently retired from politics.
    - Then-Deputy Prime Minister Phạm Bình Minh was elected Permanent Deputy Prime Minister.
- 2022
  - 7 June: Nguyễn Thanh Long was dismissed as Minister of Health following disciplinary action over violations connected to the Viet Á COVID-19 test-kit scandal.
  - 15 July: Đào Hồng Lan, then-Secretary of the Provincial Party Committee of Bắc Ninh, was appointed as Acting Minister of Health.
  - 21 October:
    - Nguyễn Văn Thể left office as Minister of Transportation to become Secretary of the Party Committee of the Central Agencies Bloc.
    - Nguyễn Văn Thắng, then-Secretary of the Provincial Party Committee of Điện Biên, was appointed as Minister of Transport.
    - Đào Hồng Lan was formally appointed as Minister of Health.
- 2023
  - 5 January:
    - Phạm Bình Minh and Vũ Đức Đam were dismissed as Deputy Prime Ministers as part of a broader personnel re-organisation.
    - Then-Minister of Natural Resources and Environment Trần Hồng Hà and then-Secretary of the Provincial Party Committee of Haiphong Trần Lưu Quang were appointed as Deputy Prime Ministers. Hà held both offices concurrently.
  - 23 May:
    - Trần Hồng Hà was relieved of his duties as Minister of Natural Resources and Environment.
    - Then-Secretary of the Provincial Party Committee of Hà Giang Đặng Quốc Khánh was appointed as Minister of Natural Resources and Environment.
- 2024
  - 22 May: Tô Lâm was left office as Minister of Public Security following his election as President.
  - 6 June:
    - Deputy Minister of Public Security Lương Tam Quang was appointed as Minister.
    - Lê Thành Long, then-Minister of Justice, was appointed as a Deputy Prime Minister. Long held both offices concurrently.
  - 26 August:
    - Trần Lưu Quang was left office as a Deputy Prime Minister to become Head of the Central Economic Commission.
    - Lê Minh Khái was dismissed as a Deputy Prime Minister and left the government.
    - Nguyễn Hòa Bình, then-Chief Justice of the Supreme People's Court; Hồ Đức Phớc, then-Minister of Finance; and Bùi Thanh Sơn, then-Minister of Foreign Affairs, were appointed as Deputy Prime Ministers. Phớc and Sơn held both their respective offices concurrently.
    - Đặng Quốc Khánh was dismissed as Minister of Natural Resources and Environment and left the government.
    - Đỗ Đức Duy, then-Secretary of the Provincial Party Committee of Yên Bái, was appointed as Minister of Natural Resources and Environment.
    - Lê Thành Long was relieved of his duties as Minister of Justice.
    - Nguyễn Hải Ninh, then-Secretary of the Provincial Party Committee of Khánh Hòa, was appointed as Minister of Justice.
  - 28 November:
    - Hồ Đức Phớc was relieved of his duties as Minister of Finance.
    - Nguyễn Văn Thắng left office as Minister of Transport and appointed as Minister of Finance.
    - Trần Hồng Minh, then-Secretary of the Provincial Party Committee of Cao Bằng, was appointed as Minister of Transport.
- 2025
  - 18 February – Institutional reforms: The National Assembly reduced the government from 18 ministries and 4 ministerial-level agencies to 14 ministries and 3 ministerial-level agencies. The new structure became operational on 1 March 2025.
    - Nguyễn Chí Dũng ceased to be Minister of Planning and Investment and was subsequently appointed as a Deputy Prime Minister.
    - Trần Hồng Minh ceased to be Minister of Transportation and was moved to become Minister of Construction. He replaced Nguyễn Thanh Nghị, who had been appointed Permanent Deputy Secretary of the Ho Chi Minh City Party Committee the month prior.
    - Nguyễn Mạnh Hùng ceased to be Minister of Information and Communications and was moved to become Minister of Science and Technology. He replaced Huỳnh Thành Đạt, who was subsequently appointed Deputy Head of the Central Commission for Propaganda and Mass Mobilisation.
    - Đỗ Đức Duy ceased to be Minister of Natural Resources and Environment and was moved to become the first Minister of Agriculture and Environment.
    - Đào Ngọc Dung ceased to be Minister of Labour, Invalids and Social Affairs and was moved to become Minister of Ethnic and Religious Affairs. He replaced Hầu A Lềnh, who would be appointed Secretary of the Provincial Party Committee of Hà Giang four days later.
    - Mai Văn Chính, then-Head of the Central Mass Mobilisation Commission, was appointed as a Deputy Prime Minister.
  - 17 July:
    - Đỗ Đức Duy was temporarily suspended from his position as Minister of Agriculture and Environment. The same day, the Politburo disciplined him with a warning (cảnh cáo) over violations committed during his earlier tenure as Deputy Secretary of the Yên Bái Provincial Party Committee and Chairman of the Yên Bái People's Committee.
    - Trần Đức Thắng, then-Permanent Deputy Inspector-General of the Government Inspectorate, was appointed as Acting Minister of Agriculture and Environment.
  - 30 August:
    - Bùi Thanh Sơn was relieved of his duties as Minister of Foreign Affairs.
    - Lê Hoài Trung, then-Chief of the Office of the Party Central Committee, was appointed as Acting Minister of Foreign Affairs.
  - 25 October:
    - Lê Hoài Trung was formally appointed as Minister of Foreign Affairs.
    - Phạm Thị Thanh Trà left office as Minister of Home Affairs and subsequently appointed as a Deputy Prime Minister.
    - Deputy Minister of Home Affairs Đỗ Thanh Bình was appointed as Minister.
    - Hồ Quốc Dũng, then-former Secretary of the Provincial Party Committee of Gia Lai, was appointed as a Deputy Prime Minister.
    - Đỗ Đức Duy was officially dismissed as Minister of Agriculture and Environment and left the government.
    - Then-Acting Minister of Agriculture and Environment Trần Đức Thắng was formally appointed as Minister.
  - 20 December:
    - Nguyễn Hồng Diên left office as Minister of Industry and Trade to become the Deputy Secretary of the National Assembly Party Committee.
    - Lê Mạnh Hùng, then-Chairman of the Board of Members of the Vietnam National Industry – Energy Group, was appointed Acting Minister of Industry and Trade.
- 2026
  - 27 February:
    - Nguyễn Kim Sơn left office as Minister of Education and Training to become Deputy Head of the Central Policy and Strategy Commission.
    - Hoàng Minh Sơn, then-President of Vietnam National University, Hanoi, was appointed as Acting Minister of Education and Training.
