= Government of Nguyễn Xuân Phúc =

Government of Vietnam from 2016 to 2021

Government of the 14th National Assembly
- 42nd (or 14th) cabinet of Vietnam
- 2016–2021
- Phúc and his cabinet's top ministers in 2016
- Date formed: 7 April 2016
- Date dissolved: 5 April 2021

People and organisations
- General Secretary: Nguyễn Phú Trọng (2011–24) (Note: Died in office)
- President: List: Trần Đại Quang (2016–18) (Note: Died in office); Đặng Thị Ngọc Thịnh (acting) (2018); Nguyễn Phú Trọng (2018–2021)
- Prime Minister: Nguyễn Xuân Phúc
- Permanent Deputy Prime Minister: Trương Hòa Bình
- Deputy Prime Ministers: List: Vương Đình Huệ (2016–20); Phạm Bình Minh (2013–23); Vũ Đức Đam (2013–23); Trịnh Đình Dũng (2016–21)
- No. of ministers: 29
- Ministers removed: 2 dismissed 6 left for other reasons
- Member party: Communist Party of Vietnam
- Status in legislature: One-party state

History
- Incoming formation: 11th working session of the 13th National Assembly
- Outgoing formation: 11th working session of the 14th National Assembly
- Legislature terms: 13th National Assembly (until May 2016); 14th National Assembly (from May 2016)
- Predecessor: Third government of Nguyễn Tấn Dũng
- Successor: Government of Phạm Minh Chính

The Government of Nguyễn Xuân Phúc, officially the Government of the 14th National Assembly (Chính phủ nhiệm kỳ Quốc hội khóa XIV) was the 42nd Government of Vietnam.

The government was led by Prime Minister Nguyễn Xuân Phúc, who was elected at the 11th working session of the 13th National Assembly term on 7 April 2016. He was re-elected to serve during the 14th National Assembly term.

On 5 April 2021, Phúc was elected President of Vietnam, with Phạm Minh Chính as his Prime Minister, ending the term of the Nguyễn Xuân Phúc government.

== Background ==
In January 2016, then-Prime Minister Nguyễn Tấn Dũng, who had served since 2006, was nominated for re-election to the 12th National Congress of the Communist Party of Vietnam. Following the Congress and its personnel arrangements, Dũng was removed from office by the National Assembly on 6 April, three months before his second five-year term officially ended. At the 11th working session of the 14th National Assembly on 7 April, Phúc, then-Permanent Deputy Prime Minister, was elected Prime Minister, receiving 90.28% of the votes.

Later that year, on 22 May, legislative elections were held nationwide to elect the 500 members of the National Assembly with a voter turnout rate that exceeded 99%. At the first session of the 14th National Assembly, which began on 20 July, Phúc was re-elected by the body to hold the position of Prime Minister for the 2016–2021 term on 26 July, with 485 votes, or 98.18% of the deputies. The National Assembly subsequently approved a government structure consisting of 27 members for the 2016–2021 term.

== Cabinet ==
=== Prime Minister and Deputy Prime Ministers ===
The Government was headed by a prime minister (Thủ tướng Chính phủ) and deputy prime ministers (Phó Thủ tướng Chính phủ), one of whom was designated as the permanent deputy prime minister (Phó Thủ tướng thường trực). Each deputy prime minister was responsible for one particular field of the administration.

Prime Minister and Deputy Prime Ministers of the 14th Government
Office	Officeholder		Took office	Left office	Ref
Office	Portrait	Name	Took office	Left office	Ref
Prime Minister		Nguyễn Xuân Phúc	7 April 2016	5 April 2021	
Permanent Deputy Prime Minister		Trương Hòa Bình	16 August 2016 (Note: Bình became a deputy prime minister on 9 April 2016, then became the permanent deputy prime minister on 16 August.)	28 July 2021	
Deputy Prime Ministers		Vương Đình Huệ	9 April 2016	11 June 2020	
Deputy Prime Ministers		Phạm Bình Minh	13 November 2013	5 January 2023	
Deputy Prime Ministers		Vũ Đức Đam	13 November 2013	5 January 2023	
Deputy Prime Ministers		Trịnh Đình Dũng	9 April 2016	8 April 2021	

=== Ministerial-level offices ===
There were 18 ministries; each was headed by a minister (bộ trưởng), and 4 ministry-level agencies; each was headed by a ministerial-level leader (thủ trưởng cơ quan ngang bộ), including:

- Committee on Ethnic Minority Affairs, headed by a chairman (chủ nhiệm)
- State Bank of Vietnam, headed by a governor (thống đốc)
- Government Inspectorate, headed by an inspector-general (tổng thanh tra)
- Government Office, headed by a chief (chủ nhiệm)

Status

Denotes acting minister

Ministerial-level members of the 14th Government
# (Note: As explicitly numbered by Resolution 08/2021/QH15.)	Office	Officeholder		Took office	Left office	Ref
#	Office	Portrait	Name	Took office	Left office	Ref
1	Minister of National Defence		Army general Ngô Xuân Lịch	9 April 2016	7 April 2021	
2	Minister of Public Security		General; Tô Lâm	9 April 2016	22 May 2024	
3	Minister of Foreign Affairs		Phạm Bình Minh	3 August 2011	7 April 2021	
4	Minister of Home Affairs		Lê Vĩnh Tân	9 April 2016	7 April 2021	
5	Minister of Justice		Lê Thành Long	9 April 2016	26 August 2024	
6	Minister of Planning and Investment		Nguyễn Chí Dũng	9 April 2016	18 February 2025 (ministry dissolved)	
7	Minister of Finance		Đinh Tiến Dũng	24 May 2013	7 April 2021	
8	Minister of Industry and Trade		Trần Tuấn Anh	9 April 2016	7 April 2021	
9	Minister of Agriculture and Rural Development		Cao Đức Phát	3 November 2004	27 July 2016	
9	Minister of Agriculture and Rural Development		Nguyễn Xuân Cường	28 July 2016	7 April 2021	
10	Minister of Transport		Trương Quang Nghĩa	9 April 2016	26 October 2017	
10	Minister of Transport		Nguyễn Văn Thể	26 October 2017	21 October 2022	
11	Minister of Construction		Phạm Hồng Hà	9 April 2016	7 April 2021	
12	Minister of Natural Resources and Environment		Trần Hồng Hà	9 April 2016	22 May 2023	
13	Minister of Information and Communications		Trương Minh Tuấn	9 April 2016	23 October 2018 (Note: Suspended from 27 July – 23 October 2018)	
13	Minister of Information and Communications		Nguyễn Mạnh Hùng	27 July 2018	23 October 2018	
13	Minister of Information and Communications		Nguyễn Mạnh Hùng	24 October 2018	18 February 2025 (ministry dissolved)	
14	Minister of Labour, Invalids and Social Affairs		Đào Ngọc Dung	9 April 2016	18 February 2025 (ministry dissolved)	
15	Minister of Culture, Sports and Tourism		Nguyễn Ngọc Thiện	9 April 2016	7 April 2021	
16	Minister of Science and Technology		Chu Ngọc Anh	9 April 2016	12 November 2020	
16	Minister of Science and Technology		Huỳnh Thành Đạt	12 November 2020	18 February 2025	
17	Minister of Education and Training		Phùng Xuân Nhạ	9 April 2016	7 April 2021	
18	Minister of Health		Nguyễn Thị Kim Tiến	3 August 2011	22 November 2019	
18	Minister of Health	Vacant (Note: Deputy Prime Minister Vũ Đức Đam was assigned as "Standing Deputy Minister in charge of the Ministry of Health" and served between Nguyễn Thị Kim Tiến's dismissal and Nguyễn Thanh Long's appointment as Acting Minister. The position is not itself a cabinet position.)				
18	Minister of Health		Nguyễn Thanh Long	7 July 2020	12 November 2020	
18	Minister of Health		Nguyễn Thanh Long	12 November 2020	7 June 2022	
19	Chairman of the Committee on Ethnic Minority Affairs		Đỗ Văn Chiến	9 April 2016	7 April 2021	
20	Governor of the State Bank		Lê Minh Hưng	9 April 2016	12 November 2020	
20	Governor of the State Bank		Nguyễn Thị Hồng	12 November 2020	8 April 2026	
21	Inspector-General of the Government Inspectorate		Phan Văn Sáu	9 April 2016	26 October 2017	
21	Inspector-General of the Government Inspectorate		Lê Minh Khái	26 October 2017	7 April 2021	
22	Chief of the Government Office		Mai Tiến Dũng	9 April 2016	7 April 2021	

=== Changes ===
- 2016
  - 28 July:
    - Cao Đức Phát left office as Minister of Agriculture and Rural Development when the National Assembly constituted the 2016–2021 government.
    - Nguyễn Xuân Cường, then-Deputy Minister of Agriculture and Rural Development, was appointed as Minister.
- 2017
  - 26 October:
    - Trương Quang Nghĩa left office as Minister of Transport to become Secretary of the Đà Nẵng Party Committee.
    - Nguyễn Văn Thể, then-Secretary of the Sóc Trăng Provincial Party Committee, was appointed as Minister of Transport.
    - Phan Văn Sáu left office as Inspector-General of the Government Inspectorate to become Secretary of the Sóc Trăng Provincial Party Committee.
    - Lê Minh Khái, then-Secretary of the Bạc Liêu Provincial Party Committee, was appointed as Inspector-General of the Government Inspectorate.
- 2018
  - 27 July:
    - Trương Minh Tuấn was suspended of his duties as Minister of Information and Communications by the National Assembly.
    - Nguyễn Mạnh Hùng, then-Chairman and CEO of Viettel, was appointed as Acting Minister of Information and Communications.
  - 28 October:
    - Trương Minh Tuấn was formally removed as Minister of Information and Communications.
    - Nguyễn Mạnh Hùng, who had acted as Minister of Information and Communications since July, was appointed as Minister.
- 2019
  - 22 November: Nguyễn Thị Kim Tiến left office as Minister of Health after reaching retirement age and was subsequently appointed as Head of the Central Committee for Protection and Healthcare of Officials.
- 2020
  - 11 June: Vương Đình Huệ left office as a Deputy Prime Minister to become Secretary of the Hanoi Party Committee.
  - 7 July: Nguyễn Thanh Long, then-Deputy Minister of Health, was appointed as Acting Minister.
  - 12 November:
    - Chu Ngọc Anh left office as Minister of Science and Technology to become Chairman of the Hanoi People's Committee.
    - Huỳnh Thành Đạt, then-President of Vietnam National University, Ho Chi Minh City, is appointed as Minister of Science and Technology.
    - Lê Minh Hưng left office as Governor of the State Bank to become Chief of the Party Central Committee Office.
    - Nguyễn Thị Hồng, then-Deputy Governor of the State Bank, was appointed as Governor.
    - Nguyễn Thanh Long, then-Acting Minister of Health, was appointed as Minister.
