= Government of Lê Minh Hưng =

Government of Vietnam since 2026

Government of the 16th National Assembly
- 44th (or 16th) cabinet of Vietnam
- 2026–present
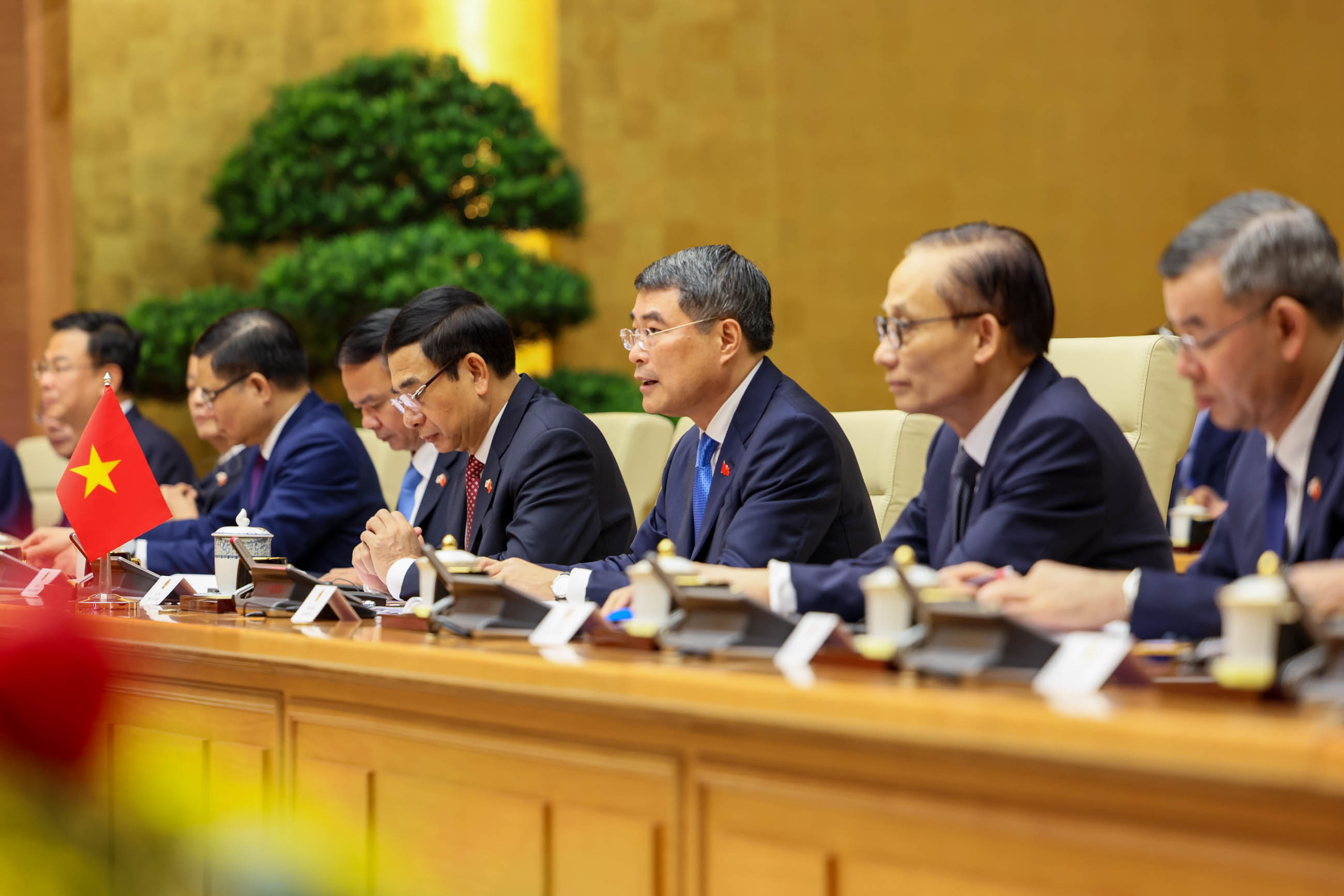
- Hưng and his cabinet's top ministers in 2026.
- Date formed: 7 April 2026

People and organisations
- General Secretary and President: Tô Lâm
- Prime Minister: Lê Minh Hưng
- Permanent Deputy Prime Minister: Phạm Gia Túc
- Deputy Prime Ministers: List: Phan Văn Giang (2025–); Phạm Thị Thanh Trà (2025–); Hồ Quốc Dũng (2026–); Nguyễn Văn Thắng (2026–); Lê Tiến Châu (2026–)
- No. of ministers: 18
- Ministers removed: 0 dismissed 1 left for other reasons
- Member party: Communist Party of Vietnam
- Status in legislature: One-party state

History
- Election: 2026 legislative election
- Legislature term: 16th National Assembly
- Predecessor: Government of Phạm Minh Chính

The Government of Lê Minh Hưng, officially the Government of the 16th National Assembly (Chính phủ nhiệm kỳ Quốc hội khóa XVI), is the 44th cabinet of Vietnam, inaugurated following its confirmation by the 16th National Assembly of Vietnam.

Leading the government is incumbent Prime Minister Lê Minh Hưng. Both he and the other members of the government were confirmed by the National Assembly during the 1st session of the 16th National Assembly.

== Background ==
After the 14th National Congress held in January 2026, the new Central Committee of 200 members established strategic orientations on personnel. At this Congress, thirteen Politburo members and Central Committee members working in the Government of the 15th National Assembly did not seek re-election: Phạm Minh Chính (Prime Minister); Trần Hồng Hà, Lê Thành Long, Bùi Thanh Sơn, Hồ Đức Phớc, Nguyễn Chí Dũng, Mai Văn Chính (Deputy Prime Ministers); Nguyễn Mạnh Hùng (Minister of Information and Communications), Đào Ngọc Dung (Minister of Ethnic Minorities and Religions), Nguyễn Văn Hùng (Minister of Culture, Sports and Tourism), Trần Văn Sơn (Chief of the Government Office) and Đoàn Hồng Phong (Inspector-General of the Government).

On 15 March 2026, legislative elections were held nationwide with a voter turnout rate exceeding 99%. The results elected 500 National Assembly representatives, creating the highest legal basis for consolidating the state apparatus.

It is expected that the personnel for ministerial and sectoral leadership positions in this term will show a clear trend towards younger generations, with the emergence of many officials from the late 1970s and early 1980s. This group is highly regarded for their professional qualifications (most hold Doctorate or Master's degree) and modern management thinking, in line with the global trend of digital transformation.

== Cabinet members ==
The current formation was confirmed by the 16th National Assembly of Vietnam's first session on 8 April 2026, with some members retained their seats from the previous term.

=== Prime Minister and Deputy Prime Ministers ===
The Government is headed by a prime minister (Thủ tướng Chính phủ) and 6 deputy prime ministers (Phó Thủ tướng Chính phủ), including 1 permanent deputy prime minister (Phó Thủ tướng thường trực), who ranks second in the cabinet after the prime minister and above all the other deputy prime ministers and ministers. Each deputy prime minister is responsible for one particular field of the administration.

Prime Minister and Deputy Prime Ministers of the 16th Government
#	Office	Officeholder		Took office	Left office
#	Office	Portrait	Name	Took office	Left office
1	Prime Minister		Lê Minh Hưng	7 April 2026	Incumbent
2	Permanent Deputy Prime Minister; In charge of Internal Affairs, Industry and Trade, Transportation, and Construction, alongside the Southeastern region		Phạm Gia Túc	8 April 2026	Incumbent
3	Deputy Prime Minister; In charge of Defense - Security and Foreign Affairs, alongside the regions of South Central Coast and Central Highlands		Army General; Phan Văn Giang	8 April 2026	Incumbent
4	Deputy Prime Minister; In charge of Interior, Health, and Culture, Sports, and Tourism, alongside the Northeastern and Northwestern regions		Phạm Thị Thanh Trà	25 October 2025	Incumbent
5	Deputy Prime Minister; In charge of Science and Technology, Agriculture and Environment, and Ethnic and Religious Affairs, alongside Mekong River Delta region		Hồ Quốc Dũng	25 October 2025	Incumbent
6	Deputy Prime Minister; In charge of Comprehensive Economics, alongside Red River Delta region		Nguyễn Văn Thắng	8 April 2026	Incumbent
7	Deputy Prime Minister; In charge of Justice, Education, and Inspection, alongside the North Central region		Lê Tiến Châu	8 April 2026	Incumbent

=== Ministers and ministerial-level offices ===
There are 14 ministries; each is headed by a minister (bộ trưởng), and 3 ministry-level agencies; each is headed by a ministerial-level leader (thủ trưởng cơ quan ngang bộ), including:

- Government Office, headed by a chief (chủ nhiệm)
- Government Inspectorate, headed by an inspector-general (tổng thanh tra)
- State Bank of Vietnam, headed by a governor (thống đốc)

Ministerial-level members of the 16th Government
#	Office	Officeholder		Took office	Left office
#	Office	Portrait	Name	Took office	Left office
1	Minister of National Defence		General; Phan Văn Giang	8 April 2021	Incumbent
2	Minister of Public Security		General; Lương Tam Quang	6 June 2024	Incumbent
3	Minister of Foreign Affairs		Lê Hoài Trung	25 October 2025	Incumbent
4	Minister of Home Affairs		Đỗ Thanh Bình	25 October 2025	21 July 2026
4	Minister of Home Affairs		Nguyễn Tiến Hải	21 July 2026	3 August 2026
4	Minister of Home Affairs		Nguyễn Tiến Hải	3 August 2026	Incumbent
5	Minister of Justice		Hoàng Thanh Tùng	8 April 2026	Incumbent
6	Minister of Finance		Ngô Văn Tuấn	8 April 2026	Incumbent
7	Minister of Industry and Trade		Lê Mạnh Hùng	8 April 2026	Incumbent
8	Minister of Agriculture and Environment		Trịnh Việt Hùng	8 April 2026	Incumbent
9	Minister of Construction		Trần Hồng Minh	18 February 2025	Incumbent
10	Minister of Science and Technology		Vũ Hải Quân	8 April 2026	Incumbent
11	Minister of Education and Training		Hoàng Minh Sơn	8 April 2026	Incumbent
12	Minister of Culture, Sports and Tourism		Lâm Thị Phương Thanh	8 April 2026	Incumbent
13	Minister of Health		Đào Hồng Lan	21 October 2022	Incumbent
14	Minister of Ethnic and Religious Affairs		Nguyễn Đình Khang	8 April 2026	Incumbent
15	Governor of the State Bank		Phạm Đức Ấn	8 April 2026	Incumbent
16	Inspector-General of the Government Inspectorate		Nguyễn Quốc Đoàn	8 April 2026	Incumbent
17	Chief of the Government Office		Đặng Xuân Phong	8 April 2026	Incumbent
