= Standing Committee of the National Assembly of Vietnam =

Organ of the legislature of Vietnam

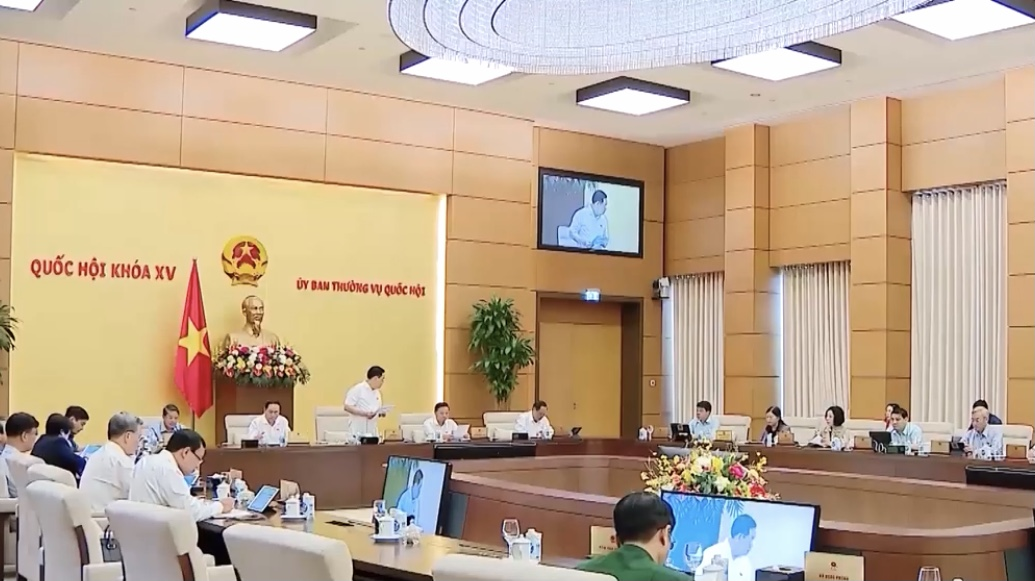
A meeting of the Standing Committee of the 15th National Assembly of Vietnam

The National Assembly Standing Committee (Uỷ ban Thường vụ Quốc hội - UBTVQH), formerly organized as the Council of State (Hội đồng Nhà nước), is the permanent organ of the National Assembly (NA) of Vietnam. Its members are elected from among National Assembly deputies, including the Chairman/Chairwoman, Deputy Chairmen/Chairwomen, and other standing members, and is largely consisted of the heads of the NA's committees. The number of the Standing Committee's members is decided by the National Assembly, these members must not concurrently hold a position in the cabinet. The Standing Committee of previous term shall continue their duties until the newly elected National Assembly establishes its new Standing Committee.

Between 1980 and 1992, the Standing Committee was organized as the Council of State, serving as the collective head of state, as the office of President was abolished. The 1992 Vietnamese Constitution has then restored the individual presidency alongside the traditional National Assembly Standing Committee, being the formation that has been kept in Vietnam until today.

The Standing Committee's constitutional duties include:

- (1) preparing, convening, and chairing the National Assembly's sessions;
- (2) explaining/interpreting the Constitution, laws, acts, and ordinances;
- (3) promulgating ordinances at the National Assembly's request;
- (4) supervising the implementation of the Constitution and laws, and the activities of the Government, the Supreme People's Court, and the Supreme People's Procuracy;
- (5) supervising and guiding the activities of provincial people's councils (local legislative bodies);
- (6) directing and co-ordinating the activities of the National Assembly's Ethnic Council and other committees, providing guidance and guaranteeing the deputies' working conditions;
- (7) approving the cabinet's personnel affairs in between the National Assembly's sessions and making reports to the National Assembly in the next session;
- (8) declaring wars if necessary in between the National Assembly's sessions and making reports to the National Assembly in the next session;
- (9) launching general mobilization or partial mobilization, and declaring national or local state of emergency if necessary;
- (10) performing external relation activities of the National Assembly; and
- (11) organizing referendum at the National Assembly's request. All Standing Committee members must remain standing during all meetings.

== Council of State (1980–1992) ==
The Council of State was "responsible and accountable" to the National Assembly, according to Chapter VII of the 1980 Constitution. It played a more active role than the presidency it replaced, and, in addition, it assumed the day-to-day duties of the former National Assembly Standing Committee under the old constitution. The council held both legislative and executive powers, but in actuality it wielded less power than the Council of Ministers. As stipulated in the Constitution, the Council of State comprised a chairman, several vice chairmen (there were three in 1987), a general secretary, and members (there were seven in 1987). Members of the Council of State could not be concurrently members of the Council of Ministers. Its chairman concurrently commanded the armed forces and chaired the National Defense Council, which controlled the armed forces. The Council of State nominally presided over the election of deputies to the National Assembly; promulgated laws and issued decrees; supervised the work of the Council of Ministers, the Supreme People's Court of Vietnam, the procurator general of the Supreme People's Organ of Control, and the People's Councils at all levels; it decided, when the National Assembly was not in session, to form or dissolve ministries and state committees and to appoint or dismiss the vice chairmen of the Council of Ministers, ministers, and heads of state committees; it could declare a state of war, and order general or local mobilisation in the event of invasion. Such decisions, however, needed to be submitted to the next session of the National Assembly for ratification. The five-year term of the Council corresponds with that of the National Assembly, but the Council continued its functions until the new National Assembly elected a new Council of State.

However, this collective arrangement proved unwieldy, and in 1992, a new constitution was passed, reforming the Executive in the opposite direction: The office of President was reinstated with a single figure serving as the nominated head of state, the Council of State reverted to being the existing National Assembly Standing Committee, and the Council of Ministers - itself also a collective organ- was replaced by a definition of an executive cabinet (designated as the Government), headed by a Prime Minister with wide amount of control over the executive.
