= Trương Hòa Bình =

Vietnamese politician

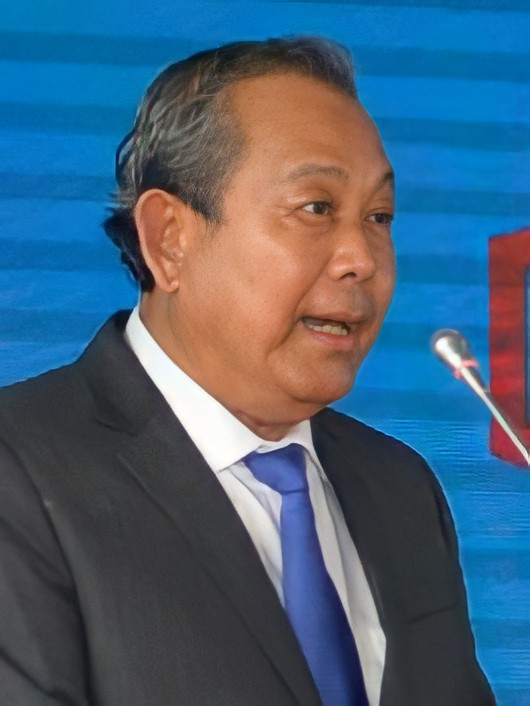

Permanent Deputy Prime Minister of Vietnam
- In office 9 April 2016 – 28 July 2021
- Prime Minister: Nguyễn Xuân Phúc
- Preceded by: Nguyễn Xuân Phúc
- Succeeded by: Phạm Bình Minh

Chief Justice of the Supreme People's Court
- In office 25 July 2007 – 8 April 2016
- President: Trương Tấn Sang
- Deputy: See list: Đặng Quang Phương; Trần Văn Tú; Từ Văn Nhũ; Trần Văn Độ; Bùi Ngọc Hoà; Tưởng Duy Lượng; Tống Anh Hào; Nguyễn Sơn
- Preceded by: Nguyễn Văn Hiện
- Succeeded by: Nguyễn Hòa Bình

Deputy Minister of Public Security
- In office 2006–2007
- Minister: Lê Hồng Anh

Procurator-General of the Ho Chi Minh City Supreme People's Procuracy
- In office April 2001 – August 2004

Member of the Secretariat
- Incumbent
- Assumed office 19 January 2011

Personal details
- Born: 13 April 1955 (age 71) Long An, South Vietnam
- Party: Communist Party of Vietnam (1974-present)
- Education: Ho Chi Minh City University of Technology (BEng); Vietnam People’s Public Security Academy (LLM)

Military service
- Allegiance: Vietnam
- Branch/service: Vietnam People's Public Security
- Years of service: 1974–2007
- Rank: Lieutenant General

Trương Hòa Bình (Vietnamese pronunciation: [t͡ɕɨəŋ˧˧ hwaː˨˩ ʔɓïŋ˨˩]; born 13 April 1955) is a Vietnamese politician and former First Deputy Prime Minister of Vietnam. He previously served as Chief Justice of the Supreme People's Court of Vietnam from 2007 to 2016.

== Early life and education ==
=== Early life and family ===
He was born on 13 April 1955 in Phước Vĩnh Đông Commune, Cần Giuộc District, Long An province. Before 1975, Bình was nicknamed "Nguyễn Văn Bình", also known as "Sáu Đạt" (lit. 'Six Đạt'). He was mainly raised by his aunt due to his family's extensive involvement in the Indochina wars.

His father, Trương Văn Bang ("Ba Bang"), was a former Secretary of the Cochinchina Regional Party Committee, then Secretary of Saigon - Gia Định Provincial Party Committee. He was considered to be one of the first regimental commanders of the revolutionary armed forces in South Vietnam – the predecessor of Liberation Army of South Vietnam (the nominal armed wing of the Viet Cong), having participated in the overthrown of the French Cochinchina Government during the August Revolution and Southern Resistance War.

His mother, Nguyễn Thị Nho (Nguyễn Thị Một), served as a member of the Cần Giuộc District Commissioner, then Standing Vice President of the Tây Ninh Provincial Party Committee. In 1955, she was assigned to Chief of the Central Office for South Vietnam, when Lê Duẩn was then Secretary of the Office. In 1959, she was imprisoned and tortured by the Republic of Vietnam Secret Service in Côn Đảo Prison before being released in 1974, then became a Deputy of the National Assembly of Vietnam, represented Long An delegation.

His sister, Trương Ngọc Thủy (Trương Thu Tâm), served in the Special Forces of Liberation Army of South Vietnam – the predecessor of People's Army of Vietnam Special Forces.

=== Education ===
From 1973 to 1975, Bình was sent to North Vietnam for secondary education at the People's Police Political Academy (then known as School No. E1711 or Training School for South Vietnamese Public Security Cadet Officers) in Tam Dương District, Vĩnh Phúc Province. After the Fall of Saigon, he returned to Ho Chi Minh City and attended Marie Curie High School, obtained high school diploma in 1977.

Bình graduated with a Bachelor of Civil Engineering, specialised in Hydraulic Engineering from Ho Chi Minh City University of Technology in 1982; and holds a master's degree in law from Vietnam People’s Public Security Academy and a certificate in advanced political theory.

== Early political career ==
=== During Vietnam War ===
Throughout the early 1970s, at the height of the Vietnam War, Bình involved in Saigon student movement alongside communist activists Huỳnh Tấn Mẫm, Lê Thanh Hải and Lê Hiếu Đằng, when he was only 15 years old. From May 1970 to October 1973, he served as a liaison officer, then as head of a liaison group and secretary of a Youth Union branch, while working as an inner-city activist in the student movement under the Saigon – Gia Định Youth Union. He was responsible for establishing an underground network at Tân Văn School in Saigon (under the Youth Union), and also attended a youth-mobilisation training course at a revolutionary base and served as Secretary of the Lý Tự Trọng Youth Union School.

From November 1973 to May 1974, at the same time as he joined the Communist Party of Vietnam, he served as a security aide in the protection unit assigned to Nguyễn Văn Chính, then the Deputy Head of the Organisation Commission of the Central Office for South Vietnam.

=== Deputy of the National Assembly of Vietnam ===
==== Ho Chi Minh City delegation ====
Bình was elected as a deputy to the 10th National Assembly, representing the Ho Chi Minh City delegation for the 1997–2002 term. During this period, he was the Deputy Director of Ho Chi Minh City Public Security Department and represented the people of Ho Chi Minh City in the National Assembly.

He was re-elected as a deputy to the 11th National Assembly, again representing the Ho Chi Minh City delegation for the 2002–2007 term, and served as a member of the National Assembly's Committee on Legal Affairs. He briefly remained in Ho Chi Minh City from 2002 to 2004 as Chief of Ho Chi Minh City People's Procuracy before being transferred to the central government, where he worked in Hanoi from 2004 to 2007.

==== Long An delegation ====
For the 2007–2011 term, Bình was re-elected as a deputy to the 12th National Assembly with 71% approval rate, representing Long An delegation – his home province. Despite working at the central level in Hanoi, he continued to serve as a deputy for Long An in the subsequent 13th and 14th terms with 81% approval rate – the highest of all deputies, until 2016.

== Public Security and rise to judicial power (1975–2007) ==
=== Assignments across Ho Chi Minh City and Hanoi ===
After the reunification in 1975 and completion of his public security training course in North Vietnam, Bình returned to Ho Chi Minh City and was appointed political security officer at Ho Chi Minh City Public Security Department, while continuing his secondary education at Marie Curie High School. He was elected Secretary of the school’s Youth Union and, later on, a member of the university’s Party Committee – responsible for student affairs, while pursuing an engineering degree at Ho Chi Minh City University of Technology.

After his graduation from the university in 1982, Bình continued to serve as an officer with Ho Chi Minh City Public Security Department, first with the Internal Security Division (PA17), then deputy team leader and ultimately team leader of the Economic Security Protection Unit, taking part in a number of major cases in the Southeast and Mekong Delta regions. In August 1985, he was appointed Deputy Head of the same division and became a member of the Party Committee of the Department.

In July 1988, he was promoted to Deputy Chief of Office of Ho Chi Minh City Public Security Department, where he served as a secretary to Police Colonel General Lâm Văn Thê, Deputy Minister of Public Security, and concurrently Director of the Department. In November 1991, he was transferred to the General Department of Security in Hanoi, then a department within the Ministry of Public Security, where he was the Deputy Director of the Cultural Security Department (A25) – the youngest deputy director of a security department at the time.

=== Năm Cam syndicate ===
==== Deputy Director of Ho Chi Minh City Public Security Department (1997–2001) ====
In April 1997, Bình was transferred from Hanoi back to Ho Chi Minh City, where he became the Deputy Director of the Ho Chi Minh City Public Security Department, while concurrently served as Head of the Security Investigation Agency. During this period, he made a significant contribution to the handling of what was regarded as one of the most serious and notorious criminal cases in modern Vietnamese history – the Năm Cam syndicate.

Năm Cam, the "Godfather of Vietnam", was one of the most powerful mob bosses in Vietnam at the time alongside Dung Hà – a female gangster from Haiphong and was once Năm Cam's right hand. Together with his accomplices, Năm Cam engaged in racketeering, extortion, loan sharking, bribery, corruption and cultivating relationships with officials in the public security, procuracy and Government Office, among other tactics, endangered both public and national security.

In late 1999, the Ministry of Public Security established a special investigative task force to deal with the case, but it proved ineffective and failed to stop the criminal activities, subsequently became increasingly violent and openly defiant of the law. The situation became even more complicated as Police Major General Bùi Quốc Huy, who was the Director of the Ho Chi Minh City Public Security Department at the time, was involved in collusion and criminal conduct connected with Năm Cam; alongside more than 150 other people – some were high-ranking government officials.

==== Procurator-General of Ho Chi Minh City People’s Procuracy (2001–2004) ====
In April 2001, Bình became the Procurator-General of the Ho Chi Minh City People’s Procuracy and continued to handle the Năm Cam case. Concurrently, in May 2001, under a newly-established special investigation agency codenamed Z5.01, he was appointed Head of the Security Investigation Agency and led both police and procuracy forces in the investigation, confronting the seriousness of the case and pursuing it firmly. He ultimately took part in the massive 155-defendant public trial from 25 February 2003 to 5 June 2003; with the overall sentence imposed in the case consisted of capital punishment for Năm Cam and four of his associates due to their involvement in the assassination of Dung Hà – then forged her own gang that feuded with Năm Cam; life imprisonment for five other accomplices; and a total of 126 years in prison for 12 of his accomplices – including 20 years in prison each for his wife and son-in-law. 18 Communist Party officials were also found guilty.

=== Back to Hanoi with the Ministry of Public Security ===
Bình returned to Hanoi in September 2004 and became the Deputy Director General of the General Department for Public Security Force Development under the Ministry of Public Security, as well as Standing Committee of the Party Committee of the same Department.

At the 10th National Congress, he was elected a member of the 10th Central Committee, a position carrying ministerial-level status.

In April 2006, Bình was promoted to the rank of Police Major General and was appointed Deputy Minister of Public Security by then-Prime Minister Phan Văn Khải. In 2007, he was again promoted to the rank of Police Lieutenant General and worked in support of Police General Lê Hồng Anh – then the Minister of Public Security. He was relieved of his post in 2007, bringing to an end of a 30-year career in the Vietnam People’s Public Security.

== Chief Justice of the Supreme People's Court of Vietnam (2007–2016) ==
On 25 July 2007, Bình was elected Chief Justice of the Supreme People's Court of Vietnam at the 12th National Assembly for the 2007–2011 term – the highest position within Vietnam's judicial system. His appointment as Chief Justice was approved during the first session, with a high expectation that he would lead Vietnam’s judicial system through these challenges and achieve important reforms aimed at strengthening the administration of justice and the application of the law, following his achievements at Public Security and People's Procuracy with the Năm Cam syndicate. In modern Vietnamese history, the country’s judicial sector had faced numerous difficulties, ranging from organisational and personnel issues to legal regulations and the handling of civil and criminal cases. During the ten years from 1997 to 2007, the Supreme People’s Court had three different Chief Justices, including Trịnh Hồng Dương and Nguyễn Văn Hiện – both were regarded as incompetent and having not met the judicial objectives.

In August 2007, the Central Committee of the Communist Party of Vietnam appointed him Secretary of the Party Committee of the Supreme People’s Court, placing him in a leading role within the judicial system.

In January 2011, at the 11th National Congress, Trương Hòa Bình was elected a member of the 11th Central Committee. He was subsequently elected by the Central Committee to the Secretariat, serving as a Secretary of the Party Central Committee.

In July 2011, at the first session of the 13th National Assembly, he was re-elected Chief Justice of the Supreme People’s Court for the 2011–2016 term, thus continued to serve in this position throughout the term until leaving office in 2016, bringing to a close more than a decade of service in Vietnam’s judicial system.

During his judicial career, Bình made significant contributions to the court system, promoting judicial research and practice and helping to strengthen the administration of justice. His activities included participating in international judicial forums, exchanging experience with and studying the judicial systems of other countries, and taking part in discussions in the National Assembly on legal issues such as whether a decision of the Prime Minister could be challenged before an administrative court.

== Deputy Prime Minister of Vietnam (2016–2021) ==
On 26 January 2016, at the 12th National Congress, Bình was elected a member of the 12th Central Committee, and was subsequently elected by the Central Committee to the Politburo for the 2016–2021 term. Subsequently, on 9 April 2016, he was elected Deputy Prime Minister of Vietnam for the remainder of the 2011–2016 term and served as Deputy Secretary of the Government Party Committee under then-Prime Minister Nguyễn Xuân Phúc. He was also assigned to be Deputy Secretary of the Government Party Committee, was appointed Chairman of the National Traffic Safety Committee, in which his vision and direction led to a major 42.71% reduction in traffic crashes, with 19% reduction in fatal crashes and 53.9% reduction in number of injuries, by 2020.

On 27 April 2016, the Politburo appointed him concurrently as Deputy Head of the Central Steering Committee on Anti-Corruption, where he assisted then-General Secretary Nguyễn Phú Trọng in the committee’s work. Under his lead, Vietnam made progresses in detecting and handling corruption, as well as promoting anti-corruption – also known as Operation "Furnace Burning" (lit. "Chiến dịch đốt lò"). Bình also oversaw the 2016 Vietnam marine life disaster alongside then-Minister of Natural Resources and Environment Trần Hồng Hà.

On 27 July 2016, he was re-elected Deputy Prime Minister for the 2016–2021 term and continued to serve as Deputy Secretary of the Government Party Committee under Phúc.

On 13 August 2016, the Politburo appointed him concurrently as Deputy Head of the Central Steering Committee for Judicial Reform – a role that oversaw significant reform in Vietnam's judicial system and public security forces. Following that, on 16 August 2016, under Decision No. 1527/QĐ-TTg, Phúc assigned Bình to be the First Deputy Prime Minister – a position that authorised him to act on behalf of the Prime Minister in directing government affairs when the Prime Minister was absent or when specifically delegated to do so.

On 22 April 2021, Phúc's successor, Phạm Minh Chính, signed Decision No. 593/QĐ-TTg assigning responsibilities among the Prime Minister and Deputy Prime Ministers, in which under the decision, Bình continued to perform the duties of Permanent Deputy Prime Minister.

On 29 July 2021, he stepped down and handed over the position to Phạm Bình Minh.

== Retirement and disciplinary actions ==
Bình went into permanent retirement in July 2021, following his resignation from the Deputy Prime Minister position. Despite that, he regularly attended governmental events at schools, universities, hospitals and public security forces across the country. He also published a poet book in July 2024.

On 13 December 2024, after considering the proposal of the Central Inspection Commission of the Communist Party of Vietnam, the Politburo concluded that, during Bình's tenure as Deputy Prime Minister, he had shown a lack of responsibility in leadership and direction; violated Party and State regulations in carrying out his assigned duties and responsibilities and in the prevention and combating of corruption and misconduct; and breached regulations on matters Party members are prohibited from doing as well as requirements concerning exemplary conduct; in which these violations were said to have “caused serious consequences, generated adverse public opinion, and affected the prestige of the Party and the State”.

Taking into account the nature, seriousness, consequences, and causes of the violations, the Politburo decided to issue former Deputy Prime Minister Trương Hòa Bình with a warning as a disciplinary measure.

On 4 April 2025, for the second time, the Central Inspection Commission announced the outcome, in which it found that Bình again had violated regulations and laws in the performance of his assigned duties and responsibilities, including in the prevention and combating of corruption and misconduct; and suggested the Polituro to take actions against Bình. Ultimately, on 10 April 2025, the Central Committee decided to remove him from all of his positions within the Party.

According to some reports, his violations were connected to the Sài Gòn – Đại Ninh project, in which he was alleged to have instructed the Government Inspectorate to improperly amend an inspection conclusion in order to conceal wrongdoing involving Nguyễn Cao Trí – chairman of Capella Holdings, who was also involved in Vạn Thịnh Phát fraud case.
