= 15th National Assembly of Vietnam =

Vietnamese parliamentary cycle in 2021

←	14th National Assembly	16th National Assembly	→
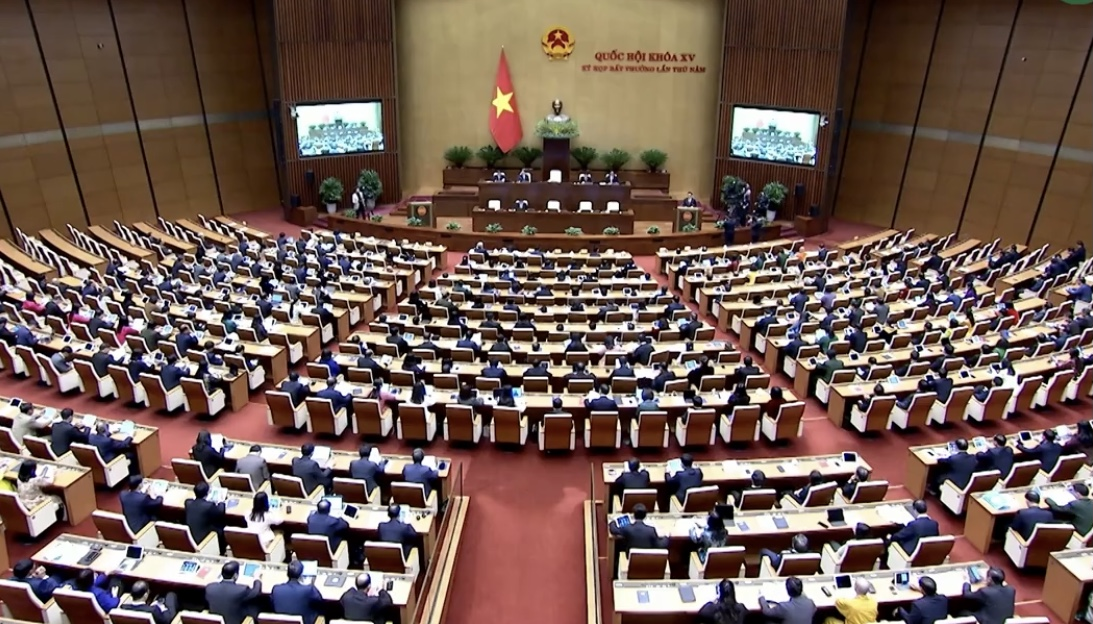
- An irregular session of the 15th National Assembly

Overview
- Jurisdiction: Vietnam
- Meeting place: National Assembly House, Hanoi
- Term: 20 July 2021 – 6 April 2026
- Election: 2021 Vietnamese legislative election
- Government: Government of Phạm Minh Chính
- Website: www.quochoi.vn

National Assembly
- Members: 499 - VFF (100%); CPV (485 - 97,19%); Independents (14 - 2,81%)
- Chairman: Trần Thanh Mẫn
- First Deputy Chairman: Vacant
- Deputy Chairmen: Nguyễn Khắc Định; Nguyễn Đức Hải; Trần Quang Phương; Nguyễn Thị Thanh
- Secretary-General: Vacant
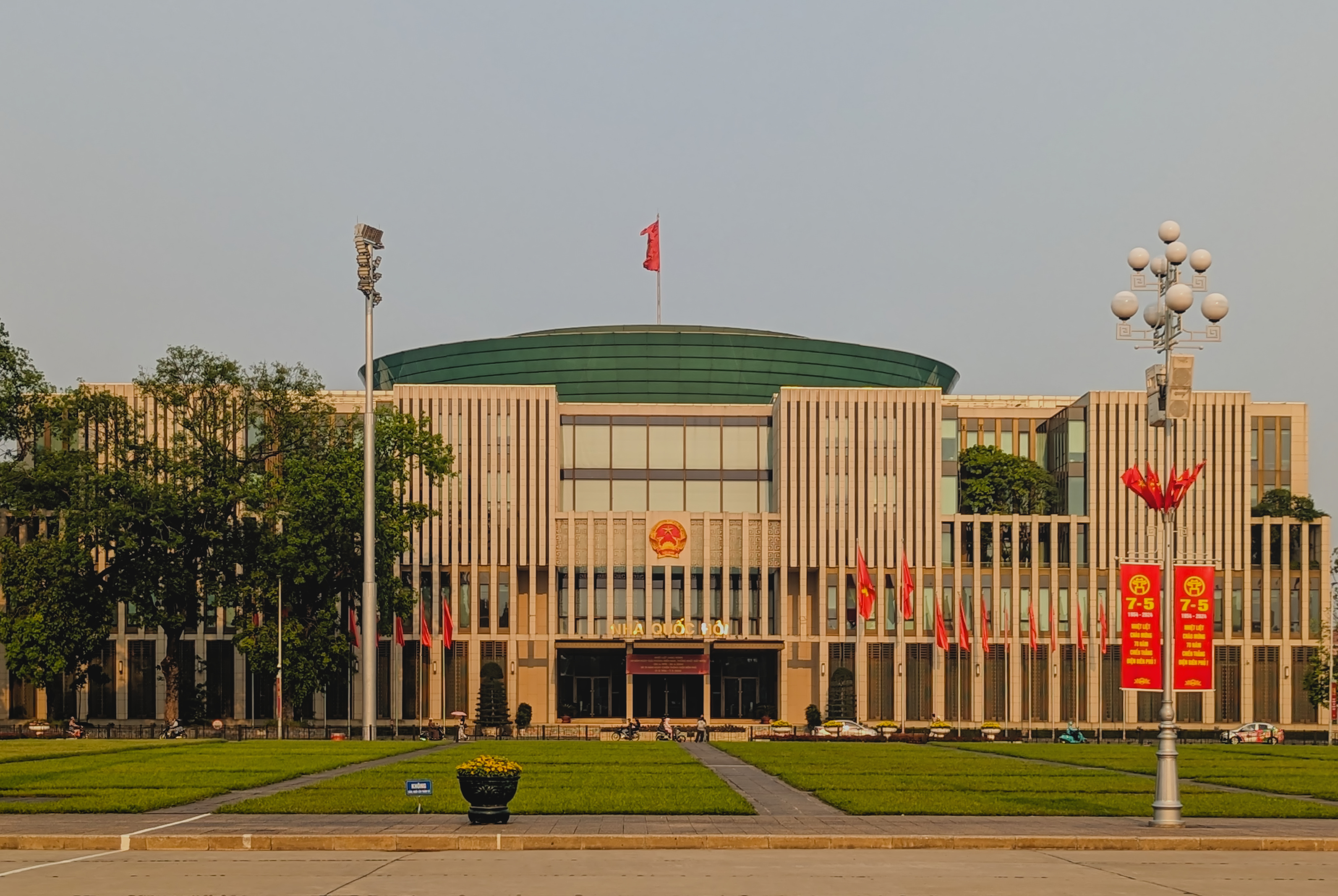

Sessions
- 1st: 20 July 2021 – 28 July 2021

The 15th National Assembly of Vietnam (Vietnamese: Quốc hội Việt Nam khóa XV, lit. 'National Assembly of Vietnam XV'; less formally the 15th National Assembly - Vietnamese: Quốc hội khóa XV, lit. 'National Assembly XV') was the parliamentary cycle that commenced in July 2021 following the legislative elections on 23 May 2021. The National Assembly had 499 members, formally confirmed at the 8th meeting of the National Election Council on 12 July 2021, and was mechanically dismissed by 6 April 2026, following the first session of the succeeding 16th National Assembly of Vietnam.

The 15th National Assembly first convened on 20 July 2021 to re-elect Vương Đình Huệ as its Chairman, Nguyễn Xuân Phúc as President of Vietnam and Phạm Minh Chính as Prime Minister of Vietnam. In 2025, the Assembly had agreed to organize the 2026 Vietnamese legislative election sooner than usual, which also means that the incumbent National Assembly would be disbanded by early April 2026 (instead of July).

== Election ==
Legislative elections were held on 23 May 2021 to elect members of the National Assembly and deputies of provincial, district and communical councils. About 69,243,604 people went to vote in 63 provinces and municipalities throughout the country. There were 868 candidates contested in 184 multi-member constituencies nationwide, with a maximum of 500 candidates elected.

On 10 June 2021, the National Election Council refused to affirm the membership of Trần Văn Nam, CPV Secretary of Bình Dương Province following investigations in his corruption. His seat in Bình Dương Province was removed.

At the end 499 candidates were announced elected. The Communist party won 485 seats with the rest going to independent candidates.

== Leadership ==
- Chairman: Vương Đình Huệ
- First Deputy Chairman: Trần Thanh Mẫn
- Deputy Chairmen: Nguyễn Khắc Định, Nguyễn Đức Hải, Trần Quang Phương
- Secretary: Bùi Văn Cường

== Composition ==
Party	Seats	%
Communist Party of Vietnam	485	97.19
Independents	14	2.81

== Sessions ==
Although scheduled to take place between 20 July and 5 August 2021, the first meeting session was shortened due to severe COVID-19 outbreaks in the country.

During the nine days of meetings, the lawmakers elected leaders of the National Assembly, State and Government leaders, the Chief Justice and Prosecutor General and heads of National Assembly committees.

It also ratified 29 resolutions, including 17 resolutions on organisation and personnel, 11 thematic resolutions, and one general resolution on the first session.

The first session wrapped up on 28 July with calls to the state and governments of all levels for COVID-19 prevention.

=== Results ===
Election of National Assembly leaders

Election of Chairman of National Assembly				Election of Deputy Chairmen of National Assembly			
Candidate	In favour	Against	Abstain	Candidate	In favour	Against	Abstain
Vương Đình Huệ	475	0	0	Trần Thanh Mẫn	483	0	0
Vương Đình Huệ	475	0	0	Nguyễn Khắc Định	483	0	0
Vương Đình Huệ	475	0	0	Nguyễn Đức Hải	483	0	0
Vương Đình Huệ	475	0	0	Trần Quang Phương	483	0	0
Election of Members of NA Standing Committee
Candidate				Candidate			
Nguyễn Thúy Anh				Lê Tấn Tới			
Nguyễn Đắc Vinh				Nguyễn Phú Cường			
Lê Quang Huy				Y Thanh Hà Niê Kđăm			
Vũ Hải Hà				Bùi Văn Cường			
Lê Thị Nga				Nguyễn Thị Thanh			
Vũ Hồng Thanh				Dương Thanh Bình			
Vũ Hồng Thanh				Hoàng Thanh Tùng			
Election of Chairmen of NA councils and committees, Secretary-General and State Auditor-General
Election of Head of the Department of National Defence and Security				Election of Head of the Council of Ethnic Groups			
Candidate	In favour	Against	Abstain	Candidate	In favour	Against	Abstain
Lê Tấn Tới	475	0	0	Y Thanh Hà Niê Kđăm	475	0	0
Election of Head of Legal Committee				Election of Head of Committee of Social Affairs			
Candidate	In favour	Against	Abstain	Candidate	In favour	Against	Abstain
Hoàng Thanh Tùng	475	0	0	Nguyễn Thúy Anh	475	0	0
Election of Head of Cultural and Education Committee				Election of Head of Committee for Science, Technology and Environment Affairs			
Candidate	In favour	Against	Abstain	Candidate	In favour	Against	Abstain
Nguyễn Đắc Vinh	475	0	0	Lê Quang Huy	475	0	0
Election of Committee for External Affairs				Election of Head of Finance and Budget Committee			
Candidate	In favour	Against	Abstain	Candidate	In favour	Against	Abstain
Vũ Hải Hà	475	0	0	Nguyễn Phú Cường	475	0	0
Election of Head of Justice Committee				Election of Head of Economy Committee			
Candidate	In favour	Against	Abstain	Candidate	In favour	Against	Abstain
Lê Thị Nga	475	0	0	Vũ Hồng Thanh	475	0	0
Election of the Secretary General of the National Assembly				Election of the State Auditor-General			
Candidate	In favour	Against	Abstain	Candidate	In favour	Against	Abstain
Bùi Văn Cường	475	0	0	Trần Sỹ Thanh	471	0	1

Election of State leaders

The elections of the State President, Vice Presidents, the Chief Justice and the Prosecutor General took place on 26 July 2021.

Election of the President				Election of the Vice President			
Candidate	In favour	Against	Abstain	Candidate	In favour	Against	Abstain
Nguyễn Xuân Phúc	483	0	0	Võ Thị Ánh Xuân	483	0	0
Election of the Chief Justice of the Supreme People's Court				Election of the Prosecutor General of the Supreme People's Procuracy			
Candidate	In favour	Against	Abstain	Candidate	In favour	Against	Abstain
Nguyễn Hòa Bình	480	0	0	Lê Minh Trí	480	0	0

Election of Government leaders

Election of the Prime Minister				Approval of Deputy Prime Ministers			
Candidate	In favour	Against	Abstain	Candidate	In favour	Against	Abstain
Phạm Minh Chính	484	0	0	Phạm Bình Minh	479	0	0
Phạm Minh Chính	484	0	0	Lê Minh Khái	479	0	0
Phạm Minh Chính	484	0	0	Vũ Đức Đam	479	0	0
Phạm Minh Chính	484	0	0	Lê Văn Thành	479	0	0
