= Vũ Văn Ninh =

Vietnamese politician

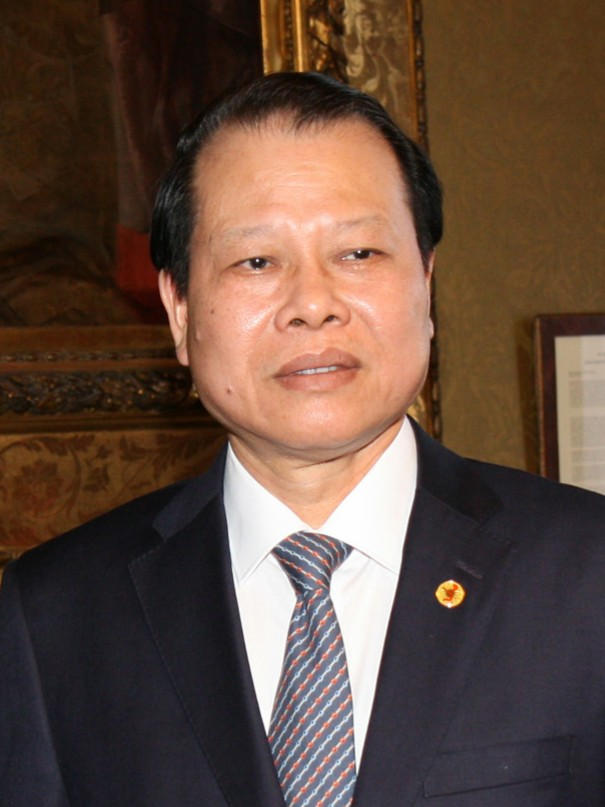

Deputy Prime Minister of Vietnam
- In office 2 August 2011 – 8 April 2016
- Prime Minister: Nguyễn Tấn Dũng

Minister of Finance
- In office 28 June 2006 – 3 August 2011
- Prime Minister: Nguyễn Tấn Dũng
- Preceded by: Nguyễn Sinh Hùng
- Succeeded by: Vương Đình Huệ

Personal details
- Born: 23 February 1955 (age 71) Nam Định Province
- Party: Communist Party of Vietnam

Vũ Văn Ninh (born 23 February 1955 in Nam Định Province) is a Vietnamese politician and was previously one of four Deputy Prime Ministers of Vietnam headed by former Prime Minister Nguyễn Tấn Dũng.

== Early life ==
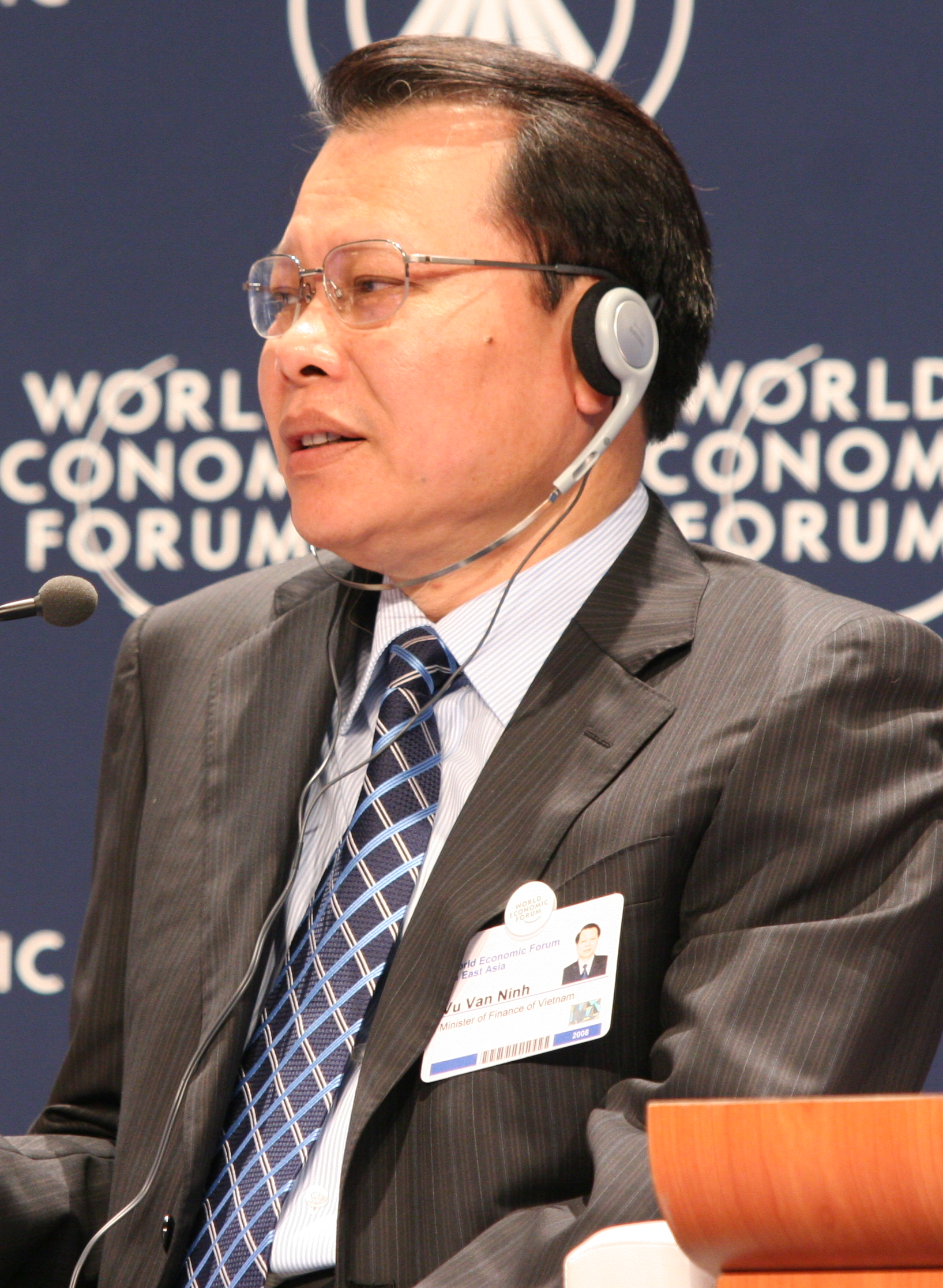

Ninh was born on February 23, 1955, in Nam Định Province. After graduating from the University of Finance and Accounting (now the Financial Academy), from November 1977 to August 1982, he was assigned to the Ministry of Finance as a professional officer, In turn, Ninh would be assigned to the Department of Foreign Exchange and Foreign Trade Management (now the Department of Debt Management and External Finance), Department of Financial Balance (now the Department of Finance of Banks and Financial Institutions), the local budget management and then the State Budget Department.

In August 1982, Ninh was promoted to Deputy Manager, working at the Department of Local Budget Management, Ministry of Finance. From November 1986, transferred to the Department of State Budget Management, Ministry of Finance. In May 1987, he was the Deputy Secretary General of the Ministry of Finance. Ninh was admitted to the Communist Party of Vietnam on 27 January 1987, officially on 27 January 1988. Ninh was the minister of finance from 2006 to 2011.
