= Ministry of Planning and Investment =

Government ministry of Vietnam

Socialist Republic of Vietnam Ministry of Planning and Investment
- Bộ Kế hoạch và Đầu tư
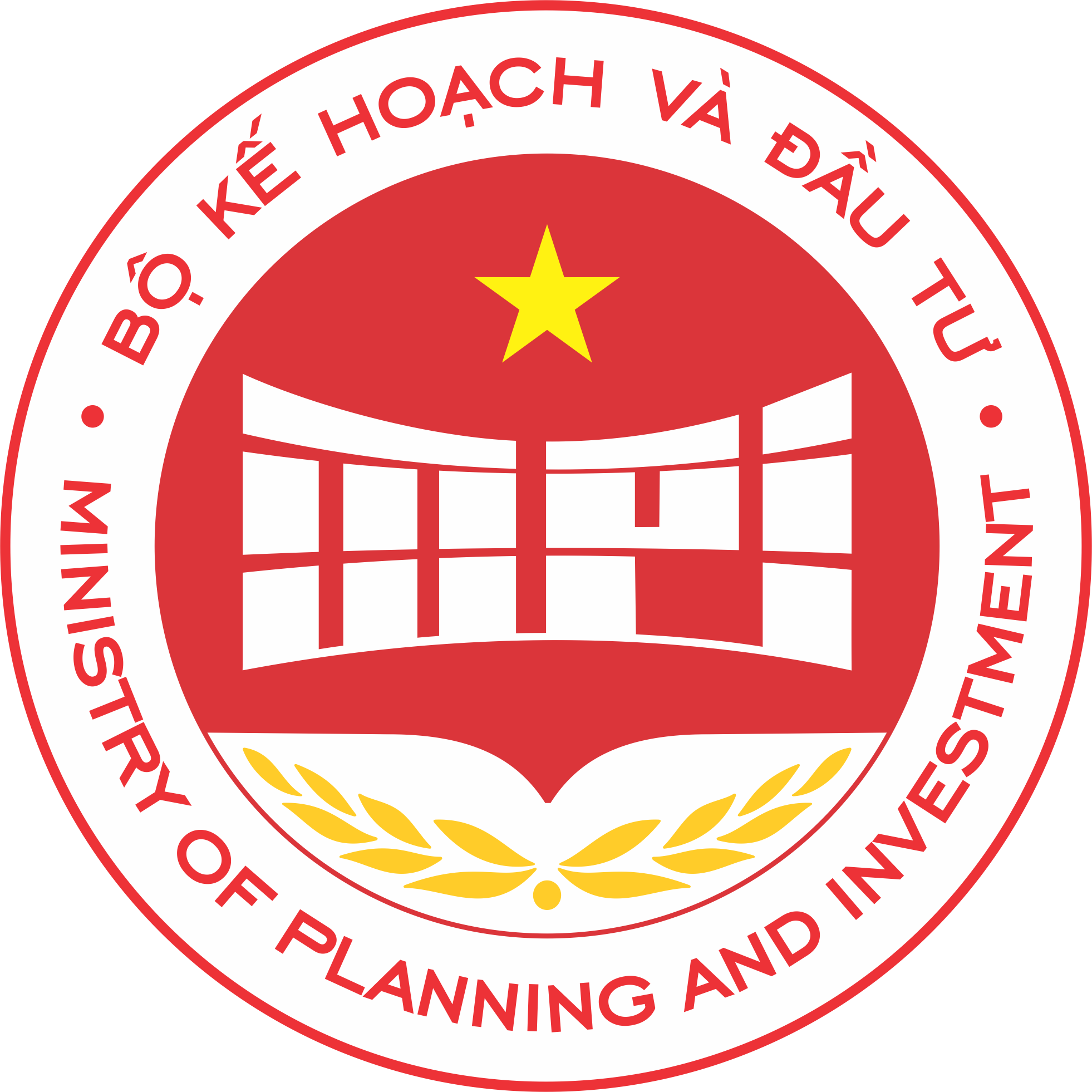

Ministry overview
- Formed: 1 November 1995
- Preceding Ministry: Research Committee of Reconstruction Planning (1945–1950) Commission of Government Economy (1950–1955) Committee of State Planning (1955–1995) Ministry of Planning and Investment (1995-present)
- Type: Government Ministry
- Jurisdiction: Government of Vietnam
- Headquarters: 6B Hoang Dieu Street, Quan Thanh Ward, Ba Dinh District, Hanoi
- Annual budget: 2.490 billions VND (2018)
- Minister responsible: Nguyễn Chí Dũng
- Deputy Minister responsible: Đỗ Thành Trung Trần Duy Đông Trần Quốc Phương Nguyễn Thị Bích Ngọc
- Website: mpi.gov.vn

The Ministry of Planning and Investment (MPI, Vietnamese: Bộ Kế hoạch và Đầu tư), formerly the Committee of State Planning, is a governmental ministry in Vietnam charged with the role of state management over planning and investment. The ministry's headquarters is located in Hanoi.

The agency provides, among others, strategic advice for country-level socio-economic development. It also programs and plans economic management mechanisms and policies for the national economy, for specific sectors as well as for domestic and foreign investments.

Foreign investment in Vietnam is governed under the Law on Foreign Investment and its related regulations, decrees and circulars. The four main types of foreign investments in Vietnam are:

Joint Ventures
Business Cooperation (Contracts)
100-Percent Foreign-Owned Enterprises
Build-Operate-Transfer enterprises

== See also ==
- Economy of Vietnam
- Government of Vietnam
- Ministry of Finance, Vietnam
- List of company registers
