= Cao Đức Phát =

Vietnamese economist and politician

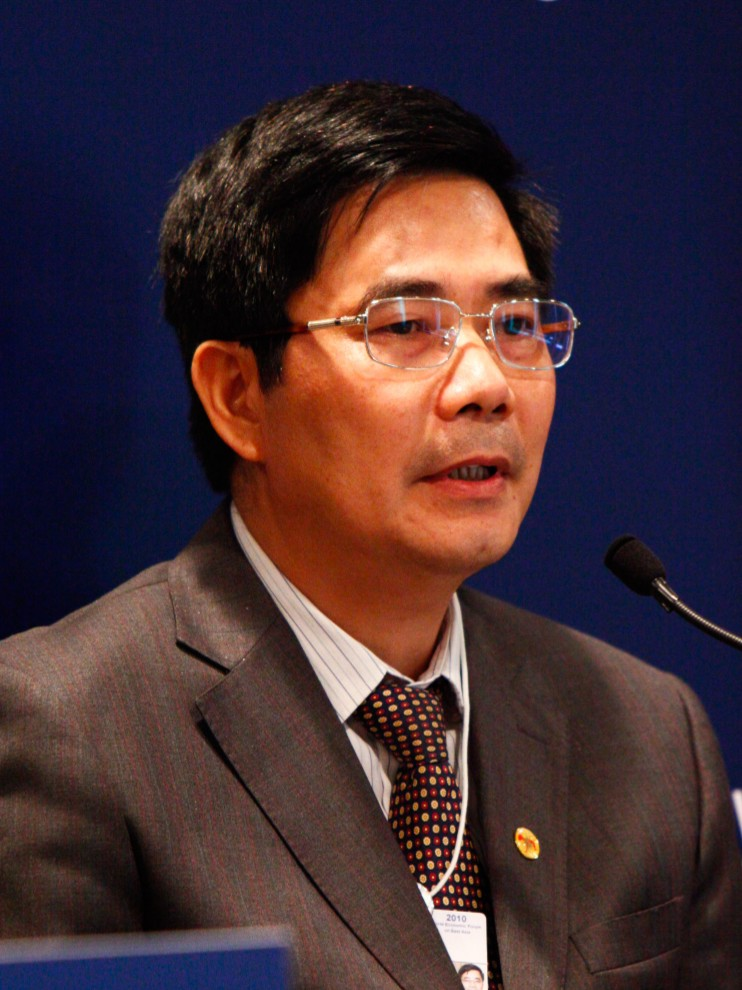

Ministry of Agriculture and Rural Development
- In office 3 November 2004 – 27 July 2016
- Prime Minister: Nguyễn Tấn Dũng; Nguyễn Xuân Phúc
- Preceded by: Lê Huy Ngọ
- Succeeded by: Nguyễn Xuân Cường

Personal details
- Born: 25 May 1956 (age 70) Nam Định, Vietnam
- Education: Agricultural Academy of Belorussia (PhD); Harvard Kennedy School (MPA)

Cao Đức Phát (born 29 May 1956) is a Vietnamese government minister. He was the Ministry of Agriculture and Rural Development from 2004 to 2016.
