= Hồ Đức Phớc =

Vietnamese politician

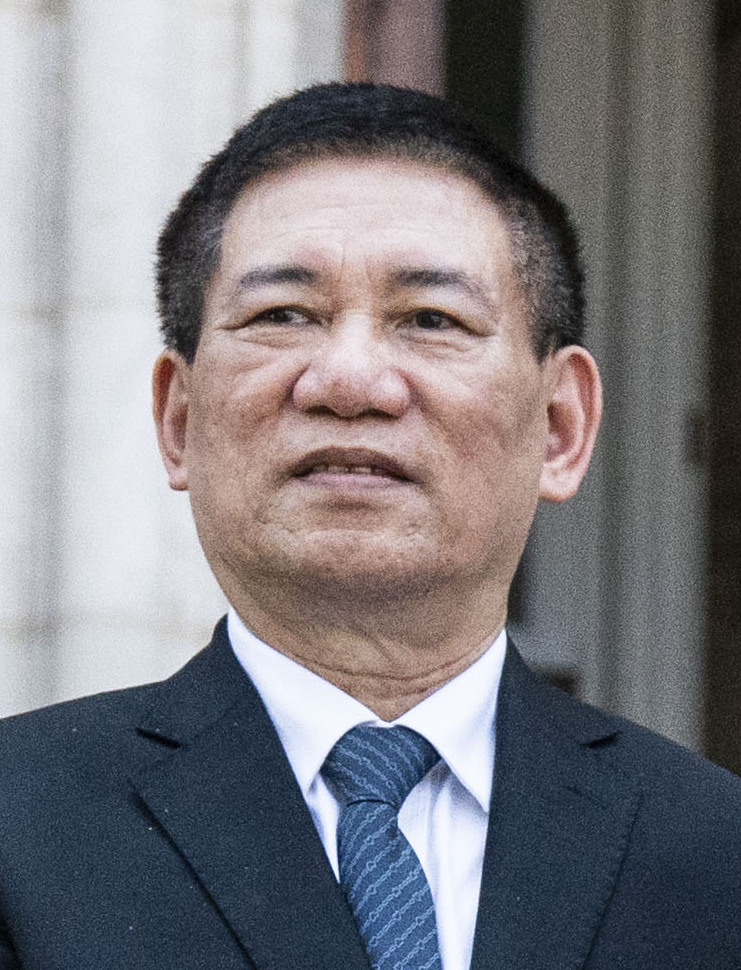

Deputy Prime Minister
- In office August 26, 2024 – April 8, 2026
- Prime Minister: Phạm Minh Chính
- Preceded by: Lê Minh Khái
- Succeeded by: Nguyễn Văn Thắng

Minister of Finance
- In office April 8, 2021 – November 28, 2024
- Prime Minister: Phạm Minh Chính
- Preceded by: Đinh Tiến Dũng
- Succeeded by: Nguyễn Văn Thắng

State Auditor General
- In office April 5, 2016 – April 6, 2021
- Preceded by: Nguyễn Hữu Vạn
- Succeeded by: Trần Sỹ Thanh

Member of the Vietnamese National Assembly from Nghệ An
- In office 2016–2021

Chair of the People's Council of Nghệ An province
- In office December 18, 2015 – June 29, 2016
- Preceded by: Trần Hồng Châu
- Succeeded by: Nguyễn Xuân Sơn

Secretary of Nghệ An Provincial Party Committee
- In office March 12, 2013 – April 16, 2016
- Preceded by: Phan Đình Trạc
- Succeeded by: Nguyễn Đắc Vinh

Chair of People's Committee of Nghệ An province
- In office December 8, 2010 – May 15, 2013
- Preceded by: Phan Đình Trạc
- Succeeded by: Nguyễn Xuân Đường

Personal details
- Born: Hồ Đức Phớc; November 1, 1963 (age 62) Quỳnh Thạch commune, Quỳnh Lưu district, Nghệ An province, North Vietnam
- Party: Communist
- Occupation: Politician

Hồ Đức Phớc (Vietnamese pronunciation: [hò ɗɯ̌k fɤ̌k]; born November 1, 1963) is a Vietnamese politician and Doctor of Economics. He is former Deputy Prime Minister, a member of the 15th National Assembly of Vietnam. In the Communist Party of Vietnam, he is a member of the Central Committee of the Communist Party of Vietnam, term XIII. He also used to be the State Auditor General, Secretary of the Party Personnel Committee of the State Audit Committee.

== Background ==
Hồ Đức Phớc is from Quỳnh Thạch commune, Quỳnh Lưu district, Nghệ An province.

== Education ==
- General education: 12/12
- Hồ Đức Phớc is an alumnus of class 21, Hanoi University of Finance and Accounting, now the Academy of Finance. He holds a bachelor's degree in economics, majoring in Finance from Hanoi University of Finance and Accounting.
- Doctor of Economics
- Bachelor of Political Theory

== Career ==
He joined the Communist Party of Vietnam on July 5, 1993.

He used to work as an accountant, Chief Accountant of Quỳnh Lưu Construction Enterprise, Nghệ An (January 1988 – May 1993), Chief Accountant of Construction Enterprise 5, Construction Company 7, Nghệ An (May 1993 – October 1994); Chief Accountant of Construction Investment Project Management Board in Cửa Lò town, Nghệ An (October 1994 – October 1997).

After that, he was elected as a member of the Executive Committee of the Town Party Committee, Member of the Town People's Committee, Head of the Finance and Pricing Department of Cửa Lò town, Nghệ An (October 1997 – September 2000); Member of the Executive Committee of the Town Party Committee, Vice Chairman of the People's Committee of Cửa Lò town, Nghệ An (September 2000 – May 2004), Deputy Secretary of the Town Party Committee, Chairman of the People's Committee of Cửa Lò town (May 2004 – August 2007).

Member of the Executive Committee of the Provincial Party Committee, Member of the Standing Committee of the Provincial Party Committee, Vice Chairman of the People's Committee of Nghệ An Province (August 2007 – October 2010); Deputy Secretary of the Provincial Party Committee, Vice Chairman of the People's Committee of Nghệ An Province (October 2010 – December 2010); Deputy Secretary of the Provincial Party Committee, Chairman of the People's Committee of Nghệ An province (December 2010 – May 2013).

Secretary of Nghệ An Provincial Party Committee from March 12, 2013, to April 16, 2016.

Chairman of Nghệ An Provincial People's Council from December 18, 2015, to June 29, 2016. Member of the Party Central Committee (January 26, 2016–present).

On April 5, 2016, at the last session of the 13th National Assembly, Hồ Đức Phớc was elected to hold the position of State Auditor General.

On April 8, 2021, he was nominated by Prime Minister Phạm Minh Chính, approved by the XIV National Assembly and President Nguyễn Xuân Phúc signed a decision to appoint him to the position of Minister of Finance of Vietnam, period 2016 – 2021. On May 26, 2021, at Decision 767/QD-TTg, Prime Minister Phạm Minh Chính decided to appoint Mr. Hồ Đức Phớc, Minister of Finance and Chairman of the Management Council of Vietnam Social Insurance, to replace him. Mr. Đinh Tiến Dũng has been appointed Secretary of the Hanoi Party Committee.

On July 28, 2021, he was nominated by Prime Minister Phạm Minh Chính, approved by the 15th National Assembly and President Nguyen Xuan Phuc signed a decision to appoint him to the position of Minister of Finance of Vietnam, period 2021 – 2026.

=== Member of the National Assembly of Vietnam for the term 2021–2026 ===
He ran for the National Assembly of the Government bloc.
