= 2021 Vietnamese presidential election =

Indirect presidential election in Vietnam

- 26 July 2021
- Turnout: 96.79%
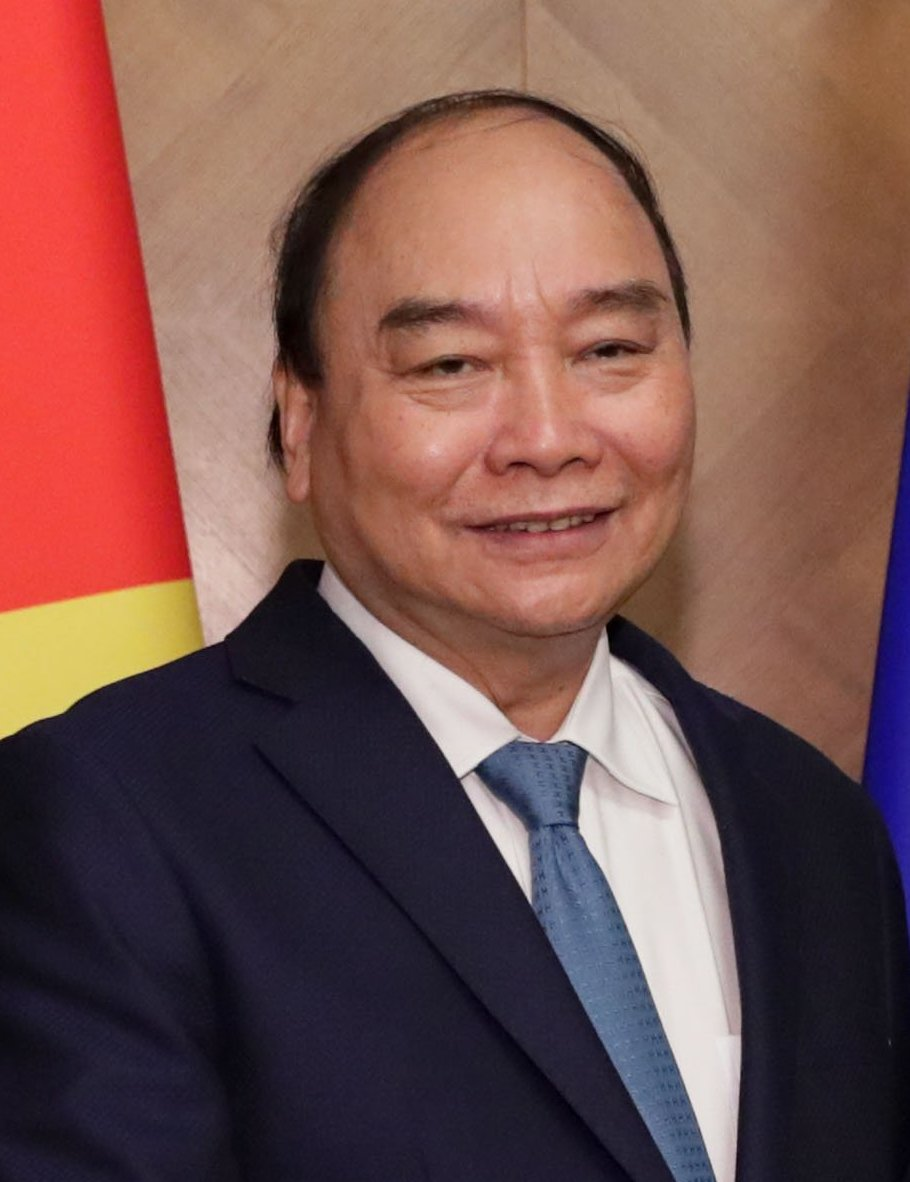
Nominee	Nguyễn Xuân Phúc
Party	Communist Party
Electoral vote	483
Percentage	100%
President before election
Nguyễn Phú Trọng
Communist Party
Elected President
Nguyễn Xuân Phúc
Communist Party
- Turnout: 96.79%
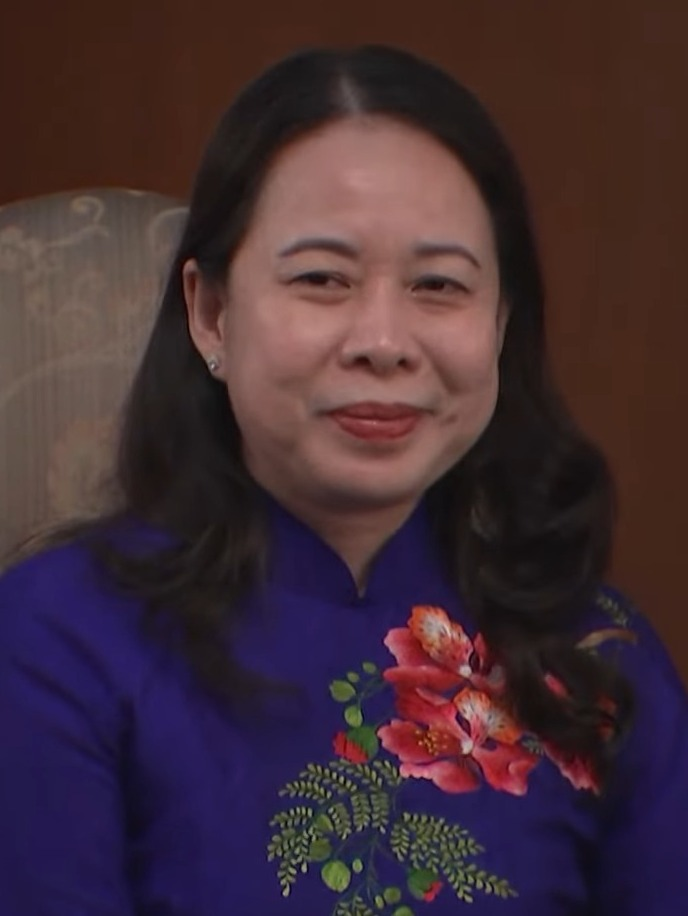
Nominee	Võ Thị Ánh Xuân
Party	Communist Party
Electoral vote	483
Percentage	100%
Vice President before election
Đặng Thị Ngọc Thịnh
Communist Party
Elected Vice President
Võ Thị Ánh Xuân
Communist Party

An indirect presidential election was held in Vietnam on 26 July 2021 following the 2021 Vietnamese legislative election.

The sole presidential candidate running within Vietnam's one-party state, Nguyễn Xuân Phúc, and sole vice presidential candidate Võ Thị Ánh Xuân, both were elected by the National Assembly of Vietnam. Out of 499 legislators of the National Assembly, 483 were present at the time of the election.

== Results ==
=== Election of President ===
Candidate	Party	Votes	%
Nguyễn Xuân Phúc	Communist Party of Vietnam	483	100.00
Total		483	100.00
Valid votes		483	100.00
Invalid/blank votes		0	0.00
Total votes		483	100.00
Registered voters/turnout		499	96.79
Source: VN+

=== Election of Vice President ===
Candidate	Party	Votes	%
Võ Thị Ánh Xuân	Communist Party of Vietnam	483	100.00
Total		483	100.00
Valid votes		483	100.00
Invalid/blank votes		0	0.00
Total votes		483	100.00
Registered voters/turnout		499	96.79
