= Lê Minh Khái =

Vietnamese politician

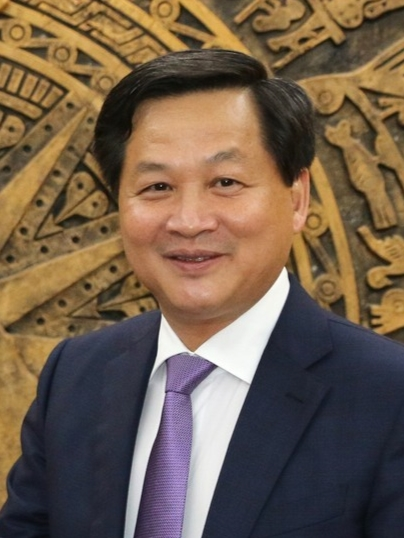
- Lê Minh Khái in 2020

Deputy Prime Minister of Vietnam
- In office 8 April 2021 – 26 August 2024
- Prime Minister: Phạm Minh Chính
- Preceded by: Vương Đình Huệ
- Succeeded by: Hồ Đức Phớc

Inspector-General of the Government
- In office 26 October 2017 – 7 April 2021
- Prime Minister: Nguyễn Xuân Phúc; Phạm Minh Chính
- Preceded by: Phan Văn Sáu
- Succeeded by: Đoàn Hồng Phong

Personal details
- Born: 10 December 1964 (age 61) Phước Long district, Bạc Liêu province, South Vietnam
- Party: Communist Party of Vietnam (1990–present)
- Occupation: Politician
- Website: https://leminhkhai.chinhphu.vn

Lê Minh Khái (born 10 December 1964) is a politician of the Communist Party of Vietnam. He is a former Deputy Prime Minister for General Economics in the Government of Vietnam.
