= Ministry of Agriculture and Environment =

Socialist Republic of Vietnam Ministry of Agriculture and Environment
- Bộ Nông nghiệp và Môi trường

Ministry overview
- Formed: March 1st, 2025
- Jurisdiction: Government of Vietnam
- Headquarters: No. 10 Tôn Thất Thuyết Street, Cầu Giấy Ward, Hanoi.
- Annual budget: 3,159 trillion VND (2026)
- Minister responsible: Trịnh Việt Hùng
- Deputy Minister responsible: Nguyễn Hoàng Hiệp Nguyễn Quốc Trị Võ Văn Hưng Đặng Ngọc Điệp Lê Trọng Yên
- Website: mae.gov.vn

The Ministry of Agriculture and Environment is an agency of the Government of Vietnam responsible for the state management of agriculture and the environment. It was established through the merger of the Ministry of Agriculture and Rural Development and the Ministry of Natural Resources and Environment during an extraordinary session of the National Assembly in February 2025. This was part of an administrative reform to streamline the state apparatus under General Secretary To Lam.

The Ministry consists of 30 units, including 5 departments, 21 specialized bureaus, and 4 public service units. The current Minister is Trịnh Việt Hùng.

== History ==
Since becoming General Secretary, Tô Lâm has advocated for streamlining the Vietnamese state apparatus to improve efficiency. Following meetings in 2024, a government plan dated December 6, 2024, proposed merging the two ministries to resolve overlapping responsibilities in water resource management, river basins, and biodiversity. On January 11, 2025, the Politburo approved the name "Ministry of Agriculture and Environment."

On February 18, 2025, the National Assembly officially established the Ministry. It inherited all functions from the two predecessor ministries, along with poverty reduction management from the former Ministry of Labour, Invalids and Social Affairs. Đỗ Đức Duy, the former Minister of Natural Resources and Environment, was elected as the first Minister. The Ministry officially began operations on March 1, 2025.

On July 17, 2025, after four months in office, Đỗ Đức Duy was suspended following disciplinary action by the Party. Trần Đức Thắng was subsequently appointed Acting Minister.

== Organization ==
The merger reduced the total number of units from 53 to 30. During the transition, 717 staff members applied to resign, while 283 expressed interest in voluntary retirement with financial support.

- Advisory Units: International Cooperation, Planning–Finance, Science and Technology, Legal Affairs, Organization and Personnel, Ministry Office.
- State Management Units: Digital Transformation, Plant Protection, Animal Health, Fisheries, Forestry, Water Resources Construction, Dike Management & Disaster Prevention, Rural Development, Land Management, Water Resources Management, Geology & Minerals, Environment, Climate Change, Biodiversity, Meteorology, Marine & Islands, Surveying & Mapping, Remote Sensing.
- Educational and Research Institutions: Includes the Vietnam Academy of Agricultural Sciences, Vietnam National University of Agriculture, Water Resources University, Vietnam National University of Forestry, and various provincial colleges of technology and economics.
- Enterprises: Agricultural Publishing House, Resources-Environment and Mapping Publishing House, Vietnam Resources and Environment Co. Ltd.
