= Vương Đình Huệ =

Vietnamese politician

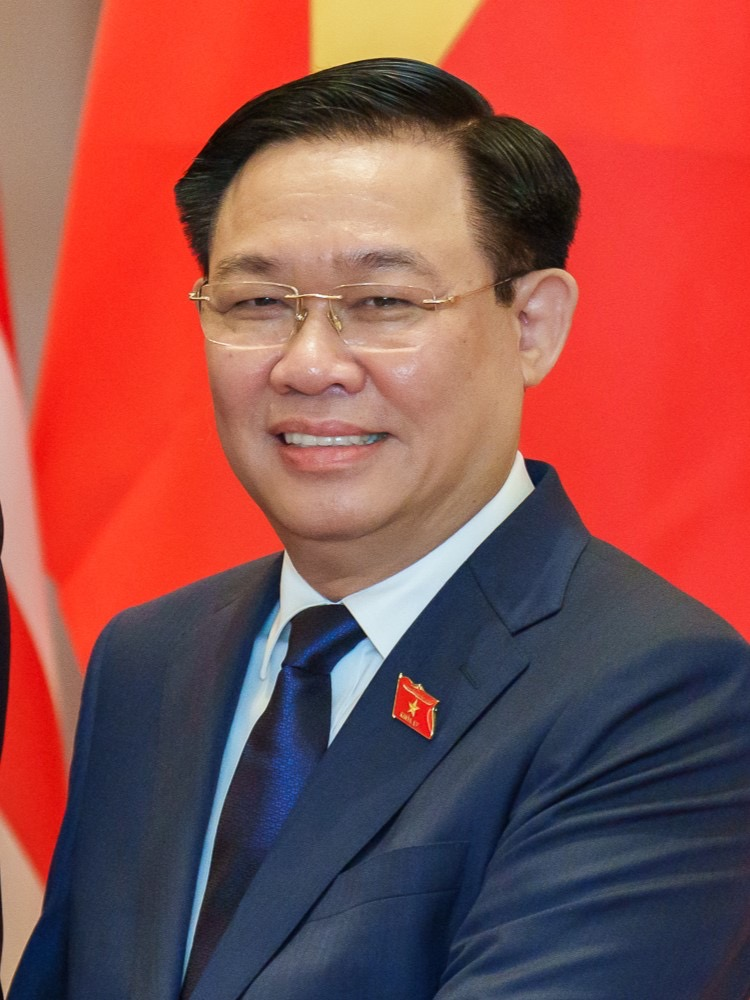
- Huệ in 2023

12th Chairman of the National Assembly of Vietnam
- In office 31 March 2021 – 2 May 2024
- Vice Chairman: Trần Thanh Mẫn
- Preceded by: Nguyễn Thị Kim Ngân
- Succeeded by: Trần Thanh Mẫn

Party Secretary of Hanoi
- In office 7 February 2020 – 2 April 2021
- Preceded by: Hoàng Trung Hải
- Succeeded by: Đinh Tiến Dũng

Deputy Prime Minister of Vietnam
- In office 9 August 2016 – 11 June 2020
- Prime Minister: Nguyễn Xuân Phúc
- Preceded by: Nguyễn Sinh Hùng
- Succeeded by: Lê Minh Khái

Head of the Party Central Economic Commission
- In office 28 December 2012 – 11 April 2016
- Preceded by: Trương Tấn Sang (2007)
- Succeeded by: Nguyễn Văn Bình

Minister of Finance
- In office 3 August 2011 – 23 May 2013
- Prime Minister: Nguyễn Tấn Dũng
- Preceded by: Vũ Văn Ninh
- Succeeded by: Đinh Tiến Dũng

State Auditor General
- In office 1 July 2006 – 2 August 2011
- Preceded by: Đỗ Bình Dương
- Succeeded by: Đinh Tiến Dũng

Personal details
- Born: 15 March 1957 (age 69) Nghi Xuân, Nghệ An Province, North Vietnam
- Party: CPV
- Spouse: Nguyễn Vân Chi
- Education: Academy of Finance; University of Economics in Bratislava

Vương Đình Huệ (Vietnamese pronunciation: [vɨəŋ˧˧ ʔɗïŋ˨˩ hwe˧˨ʔ]; born 15 March 1957) is a Vietnamese politician who served as the 12th chairman of the National Assembly of Vietnam from 2021 until his resignation in 2024. He was previously Minister of Finance and head of the PCC Economic Commission (Ban Kinh tế Trung ương), a central committee consulting agency for economic policies and strategies. He is also a member of the 10th, 11th and 12th Central Committee of the Communist Party of Vietnam. In addition, he served as Deputy Prime Minister from 2016 to 2020, and Secretary of the Hanoi Party Committee from 2020 to 2021.

== Education and career ==
From September 1979 to 1985, Huệ was a lecturer at the University of Finance and Accountancy. He began his studies for a master's degree at the Faculty of European Studies of the Ha Noi University of Foreign Languages the same year, ending his studies in 1986. Between 1986 and 1990, he was a Ph.D. candidate at University of Economics in Bratislava in Czechoslovakia.

He then moved on to work as a lecturer at the Faculty of Accounting, Hanoi University of Finance and Accountacy from 1991 to 1992, after which he served as Deputy Dean of Faculty of Accounting, Hanoi University of Finance and Accountancy from October 1992 to April 1994. He became Dean of Faculty of Accounting, staying in the position from May 1994 to February 1999. He then became Assistant Principal on training, a position he kept from March 1999 until June 2001.

From July 2001 to June 2006, Huệ served as Vice Chief State Auditor, and from July 2006 to August 2011, he served as Chief State Auditor. He became Minister of Finance in August 2011, and served in the position until February 2013.

From December 2012 to January 2016, Huệ served as head of the Party Central Committee's Economic Commission. After this, he became a member of the Politburo, and was Head of the Member of the Politburo, Head of the Party Central Committee's Economic Commission between January and April 2016. He continued to serve as a member of the Politburo, and went on to serve as Deputy Prime Minister, Head of the Steering Committee for the Southwest Region between April 2016 and February 7, 2020.

Huệ took office as Secretary of the Hanoi Party Committee on February 7, 2020.

On April 26, 2024, the Central Committee of the Communist Party of Vietnam decided that Huệ was to be relieved of his position of chairman of the 15th National Assembly. Reports from the Central Inspection Committee and other authorities stated that Hue has violated Party regulations, and his violations have affected the reputation of the Party, the State and himself. The National Assembly formally relieved him in May 2.
