= Lê Văn Thành =

Deputy Prime Minister of Vietnam (1962–2023)

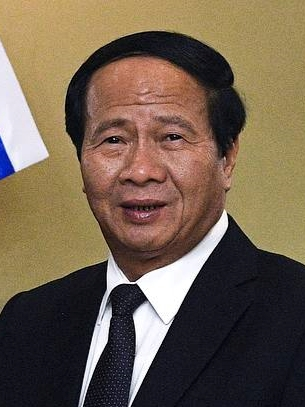
- Thành in 2021

Deputy Prime Minister of Vietnam
- In office 8 April 2021 – 22 August 2023 (died in office)
- Prime Minister: Phạm Minh Chính
- Preceded by: Trịnh Đình Dũng
- Succeeded by: Vacant

Personal details
- Born: 20 October 1962 Vinh Bao District, Haiphong, North Vietnam
- Died: 22 August 2023 (aged 60) Ngô Quyền District, Haiphong, Vietnam
- Citizenship: Vietnam
- Party: Communist Party of Vietnam (1997 - 22 August 2023)

Lê Văn Thành (20 October 1962 – 22 August 2023) was a Vietnamese politician.

== Career ==
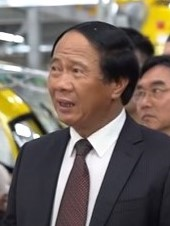
Thành in June 2019

In 1997, he joined the Communist Party of Vietnam. He served as the Deputy Prime Minister of Vietnam from 8 April 2021 up until his death.

== Personal life and death ==
He was born on 20 October 1962 in Vinh Bao District, Haiphong, North Vietnam.

He died on 22 August 2023 in Ngô Quyền District, Haiphong, Vietnam at the age of 60.
