= Ministry of Justice (Vietnam) =

Government ministry of Vietnam

Socialist Republic of Vietnam Ministry of Justice
- Vietnamese: Bộ Tư pháp
- Logo of the Ministry of Justice of Vietnam

Ministry overview
- Formed: 28 August 1945; 80 years ago
- Type: Government Ministry
- Jurisdiction: Government of Vietnam
- Headquarters: 60 Trần Phú Street, Ba Đình Ward, Hanoi
- Annual budget: 1.5 to 1.8 trillion VND (2026)
- Minister responsible: Hoàng Thanh Tùng [vi] (since 2026)
- Deputy Ministers responsible: Đặng Hoàng Oanh (since 2018); Nguyễn Thanh Tịnh (since 2020); Mai Lương Khôi (since 2020); Nguyễn Thanh Ngọc (since 2025); Nguyễn Thanh Tú (since 2025)
- Website: moj.gov.vn

The Ministry of Justice (MOJ, Vietnamese: Bộ Tư pháp) is a government ministry in the Socialist Republic of Vietnam. It is a cabinet-level agency responsible for the state management of legal and judicial affairs, including the drafting of laws, the inspection of legal documents, and the oversight of legal dissemination and education. The MOJ manages some administrative functions such as civil status registration, nationality records, and the issuance of judicial certificates, while also regulating professional legal services like notarization, legal aid, and the licensing of lawyers. It is also tasked with the enforcement of civil judgments and represents the Government of Vietnam in international legal cooperation and mutual legal assistance, all under the direct leadership of a Minister who reports to the Prime Minister and the National Assembly.

== Functions and duties ==
The MOJ is a governmental agency that performs the function of state management in the fields of legal development and implementation, legal normative document review, administrative procedure control, legal dissemination and education; state management in the enforcement of civil and administrative judgments, administrative justice, judicial support services, state compensation in administrative management and judgment enforcement, and other judicial tasks nationwide. It also oversees the enforcement of laws regarding administrative violations and manages public services in the areas under its jurisdiction.

== Units ==
- Department of General Affairs on Legislative Development
- Department of Economic and Civil Legislation
- Department of Criminal and Administrative Legislation
- Department of International Law
- Department of Legal Dissemination and Education
- Department of Planning and Finance
- Department of International Cooperation
- Department of Organisation and Personnel
- Ministry's Inspectorate
- Ministry's Office
- General Bureau of Civil Judgement Execution
- Bureau of Legal Normative Documents Post-Review
- Bureau of Administrative Procedure Control
- Bureau of Civil Status, Nationality, Authentication
- Bureau of Child Adoption
- Bureau of Legal Aid
- Bureau of National Registry of Secured Transactions
- Bureau of State Compensation
- Bureau of Judicial Affairs Support
- Bureau of Information Technology
- Institute of Legal Science
- Academy of Justice
- Hanoi University of Law
- Judicial Publishing House
- Vietnam Law Newspaper
- Democracy and Law Journal

== Ministers ==
	Office holder	Start Year	End Year	Time on duty	Role title(s)
1st	Vu Trong Khanh	1945	1946	0 years, 181 days	Minister of Justice
2nd	Vu Dinh Hoe	1946	1959	13 years, 86 days	Minister of Justice
3rd	Tran Cong Tuong	1972	1978	6 years, 118 days	Chairman of the Legislative Council of the Council of Ministers
4th	Nguyen Ngoc Minh	1978	1980	1 year, 363 days	Chairman of the Legislative Council of the Council of Ministers
5th	Tran Quang Huy	1980	1981	1 year, 153 days	Minister and Chairman of the Legislative Committee of the Government.
6th	Phan Hien	1981	1992	10 years, 286 days	Minister of Justice
7th	Nguyen Dinh Loc	1992	2002	10 years, 119 days	Minister of Justice
8th	Uong Chu Luu	2002	2007	4 years, 345 days	Minister of Justice
9th	Ha Hung Cuong	2007	2016	8 years, 260 days	Minister of Justice
10th	Le Thanh Long	2016	2024	8 years, 139 days	Minister of Justice
11th	Nguyễn Hải Ninh	2024	2026	1 year, 225 days	Minister of Justice
12th	Hoàng Thanh Tùng	2026		123 days	Minister of Justice
