= Ministry of Natural Resources and Environment (Vietnam) =

Government ministry of Vietnam

Socialist Republic of Vietnam Ministry of Natural Resources and Environment
- Bộ Tài nguyên và Môi trường

Ministry overview
- Formed: 5 October 2002
- Type: Government Ministry
- Jurisdiction: Government of Vietnam
- Headquarters: 10 Ton That Thuyet Street, My Dinh Ward, Nam Tu Liem District, Hanoi
- Annual budget: 4.187 billions VND (2018)
- Minister responsible: Đặng Quốc Khánh
- Deputy Minister responsible: Nguyễn Thị Phương Hoa Võ Tuấn Nhân Trần Quý Kiên Lê Công Thành Lê Minh Ngân
- Website: monre.gov.vn

The Ministry of Natural Resources and Environment (MONRE, Vietnamese: Bộ Tài nguyên và Môi trường) is a government ministry in Vietnam responsible for: land, water resources; mineral resources, geology; environment; hydrometeorology; climate change; surveying and mapping; management of the islands and the sea.

== Ministerial units ==
- Department of Planning
- Department of Finance
- Department of International Cooperations
- Department of Science and Technology
- Department of Legislation
- Department of Organisation and Personnel
- Ministry Inspectorate
- Ministry Office in Ho Chi Minh City
- Agency for Land Management
- Agency for Sea and Islands
- Agency for Environment
- Agency for Geology and Mineral
- Agency for Water Resources Management
- Agency for Information Technology
- Agency for Meteorology Climate Change
- Agency for Survey and Mapping
- Agency for Remote Sensing

== Administrative units ==
- Natural Resources and Environment Newspaper
- Natural Resources and Environment Magazine
- Viet Nam Natural Resources, Environment and Cartography Publishing House One Member Company Limited
