= Nguyễn Chí Dũng =

Vietnamese politician

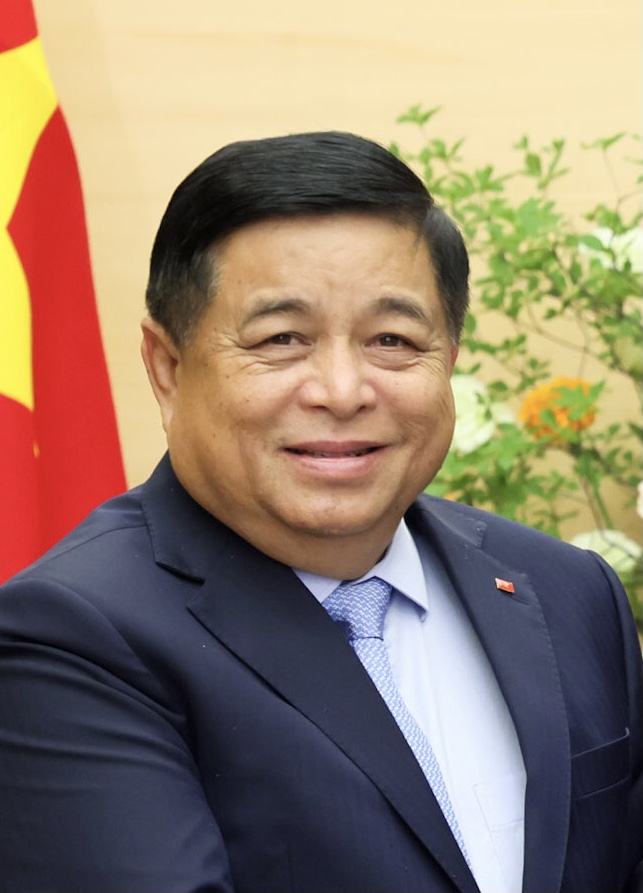
Nguyen Chi Dung in 2025

Nguyễn Chí Dũng (born 5 August 1960) is a Vietnamese politician currently serving as Deputy Prime Minister in the Government of Vietnam.

== Honours ==
- Order of the Rising Sun, 2nd Class, Gold and Silver Star (2026)
