= Ministry of Industry and Trade (Vietnam) =

Government ministry of Vietnam

Ministry of Industry and Trade Socialist Republic of Vietnam
- Bộ Công Thương

Ministry overview
- Formed: 28 August 1945
- Preceding Ministry: Ministry of National Economy (1945-1946)
- Type: Government Ministry
- Jurisdiction: Government of Vietnam
- Headquarters: 23 Ngô Quyền Street, Cửa Nam Ward, Hanoi 54 Hai Bà Trưng Street, Cửa Nam Ward, Hanoi
- Annual budget: 2.307 billions VND (2018)
- Minister responsible: Lê Mạnh Hùng
- Deputy Minister responsible: Phan Thị Thắng Trương Thanh Hoài Nguyễn Việt Sơn Lương Hoàng Thái
- Website: moit.gov.vn

The Ministry of Industry and Trade (MOIT, Vietnamese: Bộ Công Thương) is the government ministry in Vietnam responsible for the advancement, promotion, governance, regulation, management and growth of industry and trade. The former Ministry of Trade has its origins in 1945 with the formation of the modern National Unification Cabinet, and became a ministry in its own right in 1955. The Ministry of Trade merged with the Ministry of Industry in 2007 to form the Ministry of Industry and Trade. The current Minister of Industry and Trade is Lê Mạnh Hùng. The Ministry's main offices are located in Hanoi.

== Research institutions ==
Industry research organisations under the purview of the Ministry include the following. Each of these organisations is located in Hanoi except where noted:

- Institute for Industry Policy and Strategy (IPS), Director General: Dr. Phan Dang Tuat
- Institute for Leather and Footwear Research (LSI), Director: Ms. Do Thi Hoi
- Ceramic and Industrial Glass Institute (CIGI), Director: Mr. Hoang Ba Thinh
- Research Institute of Mines and Metallurgy (RIMM), Director: Mr. Hoang Van Khanh
- Electronics - Informatics and Automation Research Institute (VIELINA), Director: Mr. Nguyen The Truyen
- Food Industry Research Institute (FIRI), Director: Dr. Le Duc Manh
- National Research Institute for Mechanical Engineering (NARIME), Director: Mr. Nguyen Chi Sang
- Vegetable Oil - Flavouring and Cosmetics Research Institute (VOFCI), in Ho Chi Minh City; Director: Mr. Nguyen Trung Phong
- Institute of Machinery and Industrial Equipment (IMI HOLDINGS), Director General: Dr. Truong Huu Chi
- Vietnam Textile Research Institute (VTRI)

== Vocational schools ==
Vocational schools under the purview of the Ministry include:

=== Universities and colleges ===
- University of Industry (HUI), Gò Vấp District, Ho Chi Minh City Link
- Hanoi Industrial University (HIC), Từ Liêm District, Hanoi Link
- Industrial Economics and Technique College I, Hai Bà Trưng District, Hanoi
- Industrial Economics and Technique College II, Phước Long B, District 9, Ho Chi Minh City
- Cao Thang Technical College, District 1, Ho Chi Minh City
- Chemical Industry College, Phong Chau District, Phú Thọ Province
- Ho Chi Minh College of Foodstuff Industry, Tân Phú District, HCMC
- Mining Technical College, Đông Triều District, Quảng Ninh Province
- Mechanics and Metallurgy College, Lương Sơn Commune, Thái Nguyên City
- Sao Do (Red Star) Industrial College, Chí Linh District, Hải Dương Province
- Viet - Hung Industrial College, Sơn Tây
- Nam Định Industrial College, Nam Định City Link
- Tuy Hòa Industrial College, Tuy Hòa Town in Phú Yên Province
- Hanoi Industrial Economic College, (1) Thanh Trì District, Hanoi and (2) Cầu Giấy District, Hanoi
- Huế Industrial College, Huế

=== Vocational high schools ===
- Cam Pha Industrial High School, Cẩm Phả Town, Quảng Ninh Province
- Industrial High School III, Phúc Yên Town, Vĩnh Phúc Link
- Thái Nguyên Industrial High School, Thái Nguyên Town
- Viet - Duc Industrial High School, Sông Công Town, Thái Nguyên Province
- Industrial Technique High School, Bắc Giang Town/Province
- Industry and Construction High School, Uông Bí Town, Quảng Ninh Province
- Foodstuff Technology High School, Việt Trì City, Phú Thọ Province
- Electrical Engineering High School, Phổ Yên District, Thái Nguyên Province
- Industrial Economic Management School, Giai Pham, Hưng Yên

== See also ==
- Government of Vietnam
- Economy of Vietnam
