= Ministry of Finance (Vietnam) =

Government ministry of Vietnam

Socialist Republic of Vietnam Ministry of Finance
- Bộ Tài chính

Ministry overview
- Formed: 28 August 1945
- Type: Government Ministry
- Jurisdiction: Government of Vietnam
- Headquarters: 28 Trần Hưng Đạo Street, Cửa Nam Ward, Hanoi
- Annual budget: 25.265 billion VND (2018)
- Minister responsible: Ngô Văn Tuấn
- Deputy Ministers responsible: Nguyễn Thị Bích Ngọc; Cao Anh Tuấn; Nguyễn Đức Chi; Lê Tấn Cận; Trần Quốc Phương; Tạ Anh Tuấn
- Website: mof.gov.vn

The Ministry of Finance (MOF, Vietnamese: Bộ Tài chính) is the government ministry responsible for the finances of Vietnam, including managing the national budget, tax revenue, state assets, national financial reserves and the finances of state corporations. It manages the work of national accounting, state borrowing, the activities of stock markets, and the Department of Customs.

== History of Ministers ==
- Phạm Văn Đồng (September 1945 - March 1946)
- Lê Văn Hiến (March 1946 - June 1958)
- Hoàng Anh (June 1958 - April 1965)
- Đặng Việt Châu (April 1965 - March 1974)
- Đào Thiện Thi (March 1974 - 1975) (acting)
- Đào Thiện Thi (1975 - February 1977)
- Hoàng Anh (February 1977 - April 1982)
- Chu Tam Thức (April 1982 - June 1986)
- Vũ Tuân (June 1986 - February 1987)
- Hoàng Quy (February 1987 - May 1992)
- Hồ Tế (May 1992 - November 1996)
- Nguyễn Sinh Hùng (November 1996 - June 2006)
- Vũ Văn Ninh (June 2006 - August 2011)
- Vương Đình Huệ (August 2011 - February 2013)
- Đinh Tiến Dũng (May 2013 - April 2021)
- Hồ Đức Phớc (April 2021 - November 2024)
- Nguyễn Văn Thắng (November 2024 - April 2026)
- Ngô Văn Tuấn (April 2026 -)

== Departments ==
Following the 2025 Vietnamese Governmental Reorganization, these are the affiliated bodies of MOF, making it one of the largest ministries in the Government of Vietnam:

- National Economic Synthesis Department
- State Budget Department
- Department of Investment
- Department of Finance - Industry Economy
- Department of National Defence, Security, and Special Forces (Department I)
- Department of Local and Territorial Economy
- Department of Planning Management
- Department of Financial Institutions
- Department of Organisation and Personnel
- Department of Legal Affairs
- Ministerial Inspectorate
- Office
- Department of Debt Management and Foreign Economy
- Department of Property Management
- Department of Bidding Management
- Department of Tax, Fee and Charge Policy Management, and Supervision
- Department of Insurance Management and Supervision
- Department of Management, Supervision of Accounting, and Auditing
- Department of Price Management
- Department of State-owned Enterprise Development
- Department of Private Enterprise Development and Collective Economy
- Foreign Investment Agency
- Department of Planning and Finance
- Department of IT and Digital Transformation
- Tax Department
- Customs Department
- State Reserve
- Department of Statistics
- State Treasury
- State Securities Commission
- Institute of Economic and Financial Strategy and Policy
- Finance - Investment Newspaper
- Economics - Finance Magazine
- Academy of Policy and Development
- Vietnam Social Security

== Administrative units ==
- National Institute for Finance (Institute of Financial Strategy and Policy)
- Vietnam Financial Times
- Finance Magazine
- Training Centre for Finance Officers
- Academy of Finance
- University of Finance and Marketing
- College of Accounting and Finance
- College of Finance and Business Administration
- College of Finance and Customs
- Finance Publishing House

== State-owned enterprises ==
Following the dissolution of the Vietnamese Government's Commission for Management of State Capital at Enterprises (CMSC), MOF have taken over the administration of many major state-owned enterprises of the nation since March 2025:

- Vietnam Oil and Gas Group (Petrovietnam)
- Vietnam Electricity (EVN)
- Vietnam Coal and Mineral Industries Group (Vinacomin)
- Vietnam National Chemical Group (Vinachem)
- Vietnam Posts and Telecommunications Group (VNPT)
- Vietnam National Petroleum Group (Petrolimex)
- Vietnam Rubber Group (VRG)
- State Capital Investment Corporation (SCIC)
- Vietnam National Tobacco Corporation (Vinataba)
- Vietnam Airlines Group
- Airports Corporation of Vietnam (ACV)
- Vietnam Northern Food Corporation (Vinafood 1)
- Vietnam Southern Food Corporation (Vinafood 2)
- Vietnam Forestry Corporation (Vinafor)
- Vietnam National Coffee Corporation (Vinacafe)

== See also ==
- Government of Vietnam
- Economy of Vietnam
- Ministry of Planning and Investment, Vietnam
