= Ministry of Construction (Vietnam) =

Government ministry of Vietnam

Socialist Republic of Vietnam Ministry of Construction
- Bộ Xây dựng

Ministry overview
- Formed: 29 April 1958
- Preceding Ministry: Ministry of Water Irrigation and Architecture (1955–1958) Ministry of Architecture (1958–1973) Committee of State Basic Construction (1960–1973) Ministry of Construction (1973–)
- Jurisdiction: Government of Vietnam
- Headquarters: No. 80 Trần Hưng Đạo Street, Cửa Nam Ward, Hanoi City
- Annual budget: 133.8 trillion VND (2026)
- Minister responsible: Trần Hồng Minh
- Deputy Minister responsible: Nguyễn Văn Sinh Nguyễn Tường Văn Bùi Xuân Dũng Phạm Minh Hà Nguyễn Xuân Sang Lê Anh Tuấn Lê Hồng Vinh
- Website: moc.gov.vn

The Ministry of Construction (MOC, Vietnamese: Bộ Xây dựng) is a government ministry in Vietnam responsible for state administration on construction, building materials, housing and office buildings, architecture, urban and rural construction planning, urban infrastructure, public services, and representing the owner of state capital in state-owned enterprises. The ministry has its headquarters in Hanoi.
