= Government Inspectorate =

Vietnamese government agency

- Thanh tra Chính phủ

Agency overview
- Formed: 23 November 1945
- Preceding Agency: Special Inspectorate Commission (1945–1949); Government Inspectorate Commission (1949–1956); Central Inspectorate Commission of Government (1956–1961) Government Inspectorate Committee (1961–1984); State Inspectorate Committee (1984–1990); State Inspectorate (1990–2005); Government Inspectorate (2005–present)
- Type: Ministry-Level Agency
- Jurisdiction: Government of Vietnam
- Headquarters: 20 Hoàng Quán Chi Street, Cầu Giấy Ward, Hanoi
- Annual budget: 192.320 millions VND (2018)
- Agency executives: Nguyễn Quốc Đoàn, Inspector-General; Nguyễn Văn Cường, Vice Inspectors-General; Lê Sỹ Bảy, Vice Inspectors-General; Lê Tiến Đạt, Vice Inspectors-General; Phạm Thành Ngại, Vice Inspectors-General; Nguyễn Thanh Tuấn, Vice Inspectors-General
- Website: thanhtra.gov.vn

The Government Inspectorate (Vietnamese: Thanh tra Chính phủ), more formally the Government Inspectorate of Vietnam (GIV), is a ministry-level agency in Vietnam that exercises the function of state administration of inspection, citizen reception, complaint and denunciation settlement and anti-corruption throughout Vietnam; conducts inspection, settles complaints and denunciations and combats corruption in accordance with laws. The Government Inspectorate is headed by an Inspector-General. The current Inspector-General of the Government is Nguyễn Quốc Đoàn.

== Departments ==
- The Office of the Government Inspectorate
- Department of Economic Sectors Inspection (Department I)
- Department of Internal Affairs and General Economics Inspection (Department II)
- Department of Socio-Cultural Inspection (Department III)
- Department of Post-Inspection Supervision, Evaluation and Handling
- Department of Citizen Reception, Complaint and Denunciation Handling
- Department of Legal Affairs
- Department of International Cooperation
- Department of Planning, Finance and General Affairs
- Department of Organisation and Personnel
- Bureau of Settlement of Complaints, Denunciations and Inspection for the Northern Region (Bureau I)
- Bureau of Settlement of Complaints, Denunciations and Inspection for the Central Region (Bureau II)
- Bureau of Settlement of Complaints, Denunciations and Inspection for the Southern Region (Bureau III)
- Bureau of Anti-corruption (Bureau IV)
- Project Management Unit
- Information Centre
- Inspector Training College
- Inspection Magazine
- Inspection Newspaper
- Government Inspectorate Research Institute
