= Trần Hồng Hà =

Deputy Prime Minister of Vietnam (born 1963)

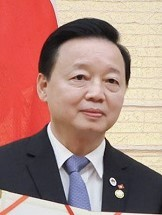
Trần Hồng Hà

Trần Hồng Hà (born April 19, 1963) is a Vietnamese politician who formerly served as the Deputy Prime Minister of Viet Nam under Prime Minister Pham Minh Chinh. He has a PhD, is a Party Central Committee member, was a member of 14th National Assembly, and has held various positions in the Ministry of Natural Resources and Environment, including Minister from April 2016 to 2023.
