= Government of Vietnam =

Government of the Socialist Republic of Vietnam
- Chính phủ nước Cộng hòa xã hội chủ nghĩa Việt Nam
- Seal of the Government of S.R. Viet Nam

Overview
- Established: 28 August 1945; 80 years ago (original); 2 July 1976; 50 years ago (form since 1976)
- State: Socialist Republic of Vietnam
- Country: Vietnam
- Leader: Prime Minister of the Government
- Appointed by: President of Vietnam
- Main organ: 17 ministries and ministerial-level offices, 5 governmental agencies
- Responsible to: National Assembly of Vietnam
- Headquarters: Government Office
- Website: https://vietnam.gov.vn/

The Government of the Socialist Republic of Vietnam (Vietnamese: Chính phủ nước Cộng hòa xã hội chủ nghĩa Việt Nam) is the state's supreme administrative and executive organ of the country's supreme organ of state power, the National Assembly of Vietnam, and in practice the central executive component and cabinet of Vietnam. The members of the Government are appointed by the President of Vietnam on the advice of the Prime Minister of Vietnam and approved by the National Assembly. The Government is led by the Communist Party of Vietnam (CPV), which is headed by the CPV general secretary.

As of 2026, the incumbent administration is the Government of Lê Minh Hưng (also known as the Government of the 16th National Assembly), which was established in accordance with the 2013 Constitution of the Socialist Republic of Vietnam. Throughout history, each state administration of Vietnam had developed its own government cabinet under various formations and natures.

== Names ==
After the establishment of the Democratic Republic of Vietnam on 2 September 1945, based on the 1946 Constitution, the executive organ was called the Government (Chính phủ). It was headed by the president, which was the second highest position in Vietnam. Under the president was the Cabinet, which was headed by the prime minister (Thủ tướng).

From 1959 to 1980, based on the 1959 Constitution, the executive organ was named as the Council of Government (Hội đồng Chính phủ). It was headed by the prime minister.

From 1980 to 1992, based on the 1980 Constitution, the executive organ was called the Council of Ministers (Hội đồng Bộ trưởng). It was headed by the chairman (equivalent to the prime minister).

From 1992 onwards, based on the 1992 Constitution the executive organ was renamed as the Government (Chính phủ). It is headed by the prime minister.

== Term ==
Based on The 2013 Constitution, the term of the Government follows the term of the National Assembly. At the expiration of the term of the National Assembly, the Government shall remain in office until a new Government is elected by the succeeding National Assembly.

== History ==
The Council of Ministers (Hội đồng Bộ trưởng) was entrusted by the 1980 Constitution with managing and implementing the governmental activities of the state.

Since 1992 the executive organ of the Socialist Republic of Vietnam is officially named the Government (Chính phủ). It consists of 14 ministries, 3 ministry-level agencies and 5 other government-dependent agencies as of 2025, headed by a Prime Minister and a corresponding number of Deputy Prime Ministers, Ministers and Minister-level Officials.

== Composition ==
The Government is headed by a prime minister (Thủ tướng) and 4 deputy prime ministers (Phó Thủ tướng).

There are 14 ministries (Bộ); each is headed by a minister (Bộ trưởng):

- Ministry of Foreign Affairs (Bộ Ngoại giao)
- Ministry of Defence (Bộ Quốc phòng)
- Ministry of Public Security (Bộ Công an)
- Ministry of Home Affairs (Bộ Nội vụ)
- Ministry of Justice (Bộ Tư pháp)
- Ministry of Finance (Bộ Tài chính)
- Ministry of Industry and Trade (Bộ Công Thương)
- Ministry of Agriculture and Environment (Bộ Nông nghiệp và Môi trường)
- Ministry of Construction (Bộ Xây dựng)
- Ministry of Education and Training (Bộ Giáo dục và Đào tạo)
- Ministry of Science and Technology (Bộ Khoa học và Công nghệ)
- Ministry of Health (Bộ Y tế)
- Ministry of Culture, Sports and Tourism (Bộ Văn hóa, Thể thao và Du lịch)
- Ministry of Ethnic and Religious Affairs (Bộ Dân tộc và Tôn giáo)

3 ministry-level agencies; each is headed by a Minister-level Official:

- Government Office (Văn phòng Chính phủ), headed by a chief (Chủ nhiệm)
- Government Inspectorate (Thanh tra Chính phủ), headed by an inspector-general (Tổng Thanh tra)
- State Bank of Vietnam (Ngân hàng Nhà nước Việt Nam), headed by a governor (Thống đốc)

The Government of Vietnam also establishes national committees (Ủy ban Quốc gia) when needed. The national committees are not separate political entities or ministries; instead they are composed of deputy prime ministers, ministers and deputy ministers in appropriate fields. The national committees act as advisor bodies to the prime minister on social and economic issues, and coordinate actions between ministries and agencies. Therefore, the national committees themselves do not have any executive powers. There are 9 national committees; each is headed by a chairman (Chủ tịch):

- National Committee for Renovation of Education and Training (Ủy ban Quốc gia Đổi mới Giáo dục và Đào tạo)
- National Committee for Digital Transformation (Ủy ban Quốc gia về Chuyển đổi số)
- National Committee for Climate Change (Ủy ban Quốc gia về Biến đổi Khí hậu)
- National Committee for Traffic Safety (Ủy ban An toàn Giao thông Quốc gia)
- National Committee for Prevention of AIDS and Prevention of Narcotics and Prostitutions (Ủy ban Quốc gia Phòng chống AIDS và Phòng chống Tệ nạn Ma túy, Mại dâm)
- National Committee for Search and Rescue (Ủy ban Quốc gia Tìm kiếm Cứu nạn)
- National Committee for Security of Civil Aviation (Ủy ban An ninh Hàng không Dân dụng Quốc gia)
- National Committee for Elderly (Ủy ban Quốc gia về Người cao tuổi)
- National Committee for International Economic Cooperation (Ủy ban Quốc gia về Hợp tác Kinh tế Quốc tế)

== Incumbent cabinet ==
The current formation was confirmed by the 16th National Assembly of Vietnam's first session on 8 April 2026, with some members retained their seats from the previous term.

=== Prime Minister and Deputies ===
The Government is headed by a prime minister (Thủ tướng Chính phủ) and 6 deputy prime ministers (Phó Thủ tướng Chính phủ), including 1 permanent deputy prime minister (Phó Thủ tướng thường trực), who ranks second in the cabinet after the prime minister and above all the other deputy prime ministers and ministers. Each deputy prime minister is responsible for one particular field of the administration.

Prime Minister and Deputy Prime Ministers of the 16th Government
#	Office	Officeholder		Took office	Left office
#	Office	Portrait	Name	Took office	Left office
1	Prime Minister		Lê Minh Hưng	7 April 2026	Incumbent
2	Permanent Deputy Prime Minister; In charge of Internal Affairs, Industry and Trade, Transportation, and Construction, alongside the Southeastern region		Phạm Gia Túc	8 April 2026	Incumbent
3	Deputy Prime Minister; In charge of Defense - Security and Foreign Affairs, alongside the regions of South Central Coast and Central Highlands		Army General; Phan Văn Giang	8 April 2026	Incumbent
4	Deputy Prime Minister; In charge of Interior, Health, and Culture, Sports, and Tourism, alongside the Northeastern and Northwestern regions		Phạm Thị Thanh Trà	25 October 2025	Incumbent
5	Deputy Prime Minister; In charge of Science and Technology, Agriculture and Environment, and Ethnic and Religious Affairs, alongside Mekong River Delta region		Hồ Quốc Dũng	25 October 2025	Incumbent
6	Deputy Prime Minister; In charge of Comprehensive Economics, alongside Red River Delta region		Nguyễn Văn Thắng	8 April 2026	Incumbent
7	Deputy Prime Minister; In charge of Justice, Education, and Inspection, alongside the North Central region		Lê Tiến Châu	8 April 2026	Incumbent

=== Ministerial-level offices ===
There are 14 ministries; each is headed by a minister (bộ trưởng), and 3 ministry-level agencies; each is headed by a ministerial-level leader (thủ trưởng cơ quan ngang bộ), including:

- Government Office, headed by a chief (chủ nhiệm)
- Government Inspectorate, headed by an inspector-general (tổng thanh tra)
- State Bank of Vietnam, headed by a governor (thống đốc)

Ministerial-level members of the 16th Government
#	Office	Officeholder		Took office	Left office
#	Office	Portrait	Name	Took office	Left office
1	Minister of National Defence		General; Phan Văn Giang	8 April 2021	Incumbent
2	Minister of Public Security		General; Lương Tam Quang	6 June 2024	Incumbent
3	Minister of Foreign Affairs		Lê Hoài Trung	25 October 2025	Incumbent
4	Minister of Home Affairs		Đỗ Thanh Bình	25 October 2025	Incumbent
5	Minister of Justice		Hoàng Thanh Tùng	8 April 2026	Incumbent
6	Minister of Finance		Ngô Văn Tuấn	8 April 2026	Incumbent
7	Minister of Industry and Trade		Lê Mạnh Hùng	8 April 2026	Incumbent
8	Minister of Agriculture and Environment		Trịnh Việt Hùng	8 April 2026	Incumbent
9	Minister of Construction		Trần Hồng Minh	18 February 2025	Incumbent
10	Minister of Science and Technology		Vũ Hải Quân	8 April 2026	Incumbent
11	Minister of Education and Training		Hoàng Minh Sơn	8 April 2026	Incumbent
12	Minister of Culture, Sports and Tourism		Lâm Thị Phương Thanh	8 April 2026	Incumbent
13	Minister of Health		Đào Hồng Lan	21 October 2022	Incumbent
14	Minister of Ethnic and Religious Affairs		Nguyễn Đình Khang	8 April 2026	Incumbent
15	Chief of the Government Office		Đặng Xuân Phong	8 April 2026	Incumbent
16	Governor of the State Bank		Phạm Đức Ấn	8 April 2026	Incumbent
17	Inspector-General of the Government Inspectorate		Nguyễn Quốc Đoàn	8 April 2026	Incumbent
