= 14th Central Committee of the Communist Party of Vietnam =

Central Committee of the Communist Party of Vietnam

14th Central Committee of the Communist Party of Vietnam Ban Chấp hành Trung ương Đảng Cộng sản Việt Nam khóa XIV
- Party emblem

22 January 2026 – (222 days) Overview
- Type: Central Committee of the Communist Party of Vietnam
- Election: 14th National Congress

Leadership
- General Secretary: Tô Lâm
- Permanent Member: Trần Cẩm Tú
- Politburo: 19 members
- Secretariat: 13 members

Members
- Total: 180 members
- Newcomers: 71 (14th)
- Old: 98 members 11 alternates(13th)

Alternates
- Total: 20 alternates
- Newcomers: 16 (14th)
- Old: 4 (13th)

The 14th Central Committee of the Communist Party of Vietnam (Vietnamese: Ban Chấp hành Trung ương Đảng Cộng sản Việt Nam khóa XIV) comprises 180 members and 20 alternates. It was elected at the 14th National Congress of the Communist Party of Vietnam (CPV) on 22 January 2026, and its term lasts until the election of the 15th Central Committee at the 15th National Congress, which is planned for 2031. The Central Committee is the party's highest decision-making body in a given period, is not a permanent body, and convenes for an unspecified number of times.

== Plenums ==
The Central Committee is not a permanent institution. It convenes plenary sessions between party congresses.

Plenary Sessions of the 14th Central Committee
Plenum	Date	Length	Ref.
1st Plenary Session	23 January 2026	1 day	
2nd Plenary Session	23–25 March 2026	3 days	
3rd Plenary Session	20–24 July 2026	4 days	

== Composition ==
=== Members ===
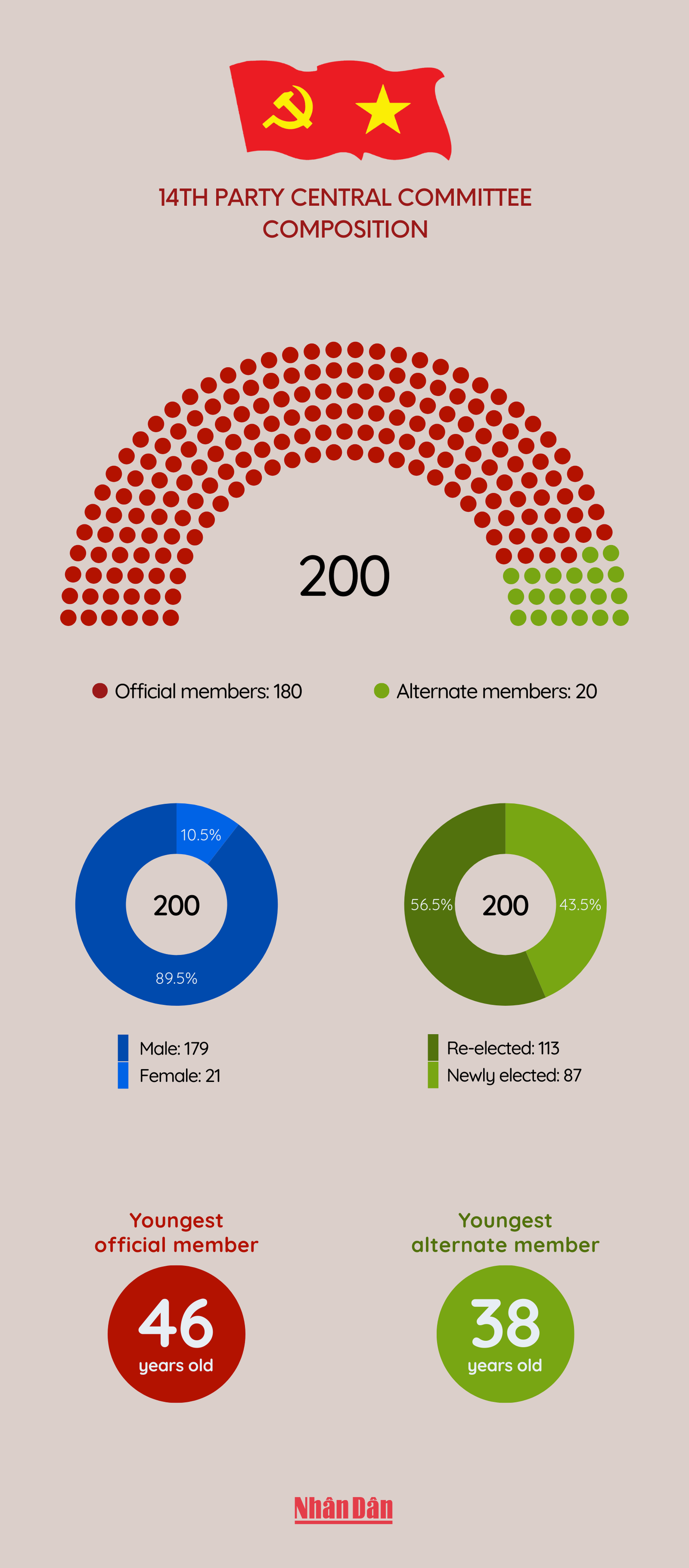
The Central Committee's composition following the 14th National Party Congress, as illustrated by Nhân Dân.

Members of the 14th Central Committee of the Communist Party of Vietnam
Name	13th CC	Birth	PM	Birthplace	Education	Ethnicity	Gender	Ref.
Cao Thị Hòa An	Nonmember	1973	—	Nghệ An	Graduate	Kinh	Female	
Phan Thắng An	Nonmember	1974	1999	Đà Nẵng	Graduate	Kinh	Male	
Phạm Đức Ấn	Nonmember	1970	2000	Nghệ An	Graduate	Kinh	Male	
Đào Tuấn Anh	Nonmember	1970	—	Hưng Yên	Graduate	Kinh	Male	
Nguyễn Doãn Anh	Member	1967	1987	Hà Nội	Postgraduate	Kinh	Male	
Nguyễn Hoài Anh	Alternate	1977	2003	Đà Nẵng	Postgraduate	Kinh	Male	
Trần Văn Bắc	Nonmember	1974	—	Ninh Bình	Graduate	Kinh	Male	
Đỗ Thanh Bình	Member	1967	1990	Cà Mau	Undergraduate	Kinh	Male	
Lê Hải Bình	Alternate	1977	—	Hải Phòng	Postgraduate	Kinh	Male	
Đoàn Xuân Bường	Nonmember	1974	—	Hà Tĩnh	Graduate	Kinh	Male	
Lê Ngọc Châu	Nonmember	1972	1997	Hà Nội	Postgraduate	Kinh	Male	
Lê Tiến Châu	Member	1969	1998	Tây Ninh	Postgraduate	Kinh	Male	
Đỗ Văn Chiến	Member	1962	1986	Tuyên Quang	Postgraduate	Sán Dìu	Male	
Hoàng Duy Chinh	Member	1968	1995	Bắc Kạn	Postgraduate	Tày	Male	
Nguyễn Tân Cương	Member	1966	—	Hà Nam	Undergraduate	Kinh	Male	
Ngô Chí Cường	Member	1967	1992	Vĩnh Long	Undergraduate	Kinh	Male	
Nguyễn Mạnh Cường	Member	1973	1999	Nghệ An	Postgraduate	Kinh	Male	
Quản Minh Cường	Nonmember	1969	1997	Hưng Yên	Graduate	Kinh	Male	
Nguyễn Hồng Diên	Member	1965	1985	Hưng Yên	Postgraduate	Kinh	Male	
Nguyễn Khắc Định	Member	1964	1988	Thái Bình	Postgraduate	Kinh	Male	
Lương Quốc Đoàn	Member	1970	—	Thái Bình	Undergraduate	Kinh	Male	
Nguyễn Quốc Đoàn	Member	1975	1998	Ninh Bình	Postgraduate	Kinh	Male	
Nguyễn Hữu Đông	Member	1972	1995	Phú Thọ	Postgraduate	Kinh	Male	
Nguyễn Trọng Đông	Nonmember	1969	2002	Hà Nội	Undergraduate	Kinh	Male	
Đặng Hồng Đức	Nonmember	1977	2000	Ninh Bình	Graduate	Kinh	Male	
Nguyễn Quang Đức	Nonmember	1971	1997	Hà Nội	Graduate	Kinh	Male	
Đặng Văn Dũng	Nonmember	1972	1997	Nghệ An	Undergraduate	Kinh	Male	
Đoàn Anh Dũng	Nonmember	1977	2004	Nghệ An	Graduate	Kinh	Male	
Hồ Quốc Dũng	Member	1966	1994	Bình Định	Graduate	Kinh	Male	
Hoàng Trung Dũng	Member	1971	1994	Hà Tĩnh	Postgraduate	Kinh	Male	
Trần Tiến Dũng	Nonmember	1975	2001	Ninh Bình	Graduate	Kinh	Male	
Nguyễn Văn Được	Member	1968	2000	Tây Ninh	Graduate	Kinh	Male	
Phạm Đại Dương	Member	1974	2005	Hà Nội	Graduate	Kinh	Male	
Nguyễn Văn Gấu	Member	1967	1988	Vĩnh Long	Undergraduate	Kinh	Male	
Phan Văn Giang	Member	1960	1982	Ninh Bình	Postgraduate	Kinh	Male	
Nguyễn Hoàng Giang	Nonmember	1971	—	Hải Phòng	Graduate	Kinh	Male	
Nguyễn Thị Thu Hà	Member	1970	1997	Ninh Bình	Postgraduate	Kinh	Female	
Vũ Hải Hà	Member	1969	1995	Ninh Bình	Graduate	Kinh	Male	
Lê Khánh Hải	Member	1966	1985	Quảng Trị	Undergraduate	Kinh	Male	
Lê Ngọc Hải	Nonmember	1970	1992	Đà Nẵng	Undergraduate	Kinh	Male	
Ngô Đông Hải	Member	1970	1998	Gia Lai	Postgraduate	Kinh	Male	
Nguyễn Long Hải	Alternate	1976	1998	Phú Thọ	Postgraduate	Kinh	Male	
Nguyễn Thanh Hải	Member	1970	2002	Hà Nội	Postgraduate	Kinh	Female	
Nguyễn Hồ Hải	Nonmember	1977	2004	Hồ Chí Minh	Graduate	Kinh	Male	
Nguyễn Tiến Hải	Member	1965	1986	Cà Mau	Postgraduate	Kinh	Male	
Tôn Ngọc Hạnh	Alternate	1980	2002	Hồ Chí Minh	Graduate	Kinh	Female	
Nguyễn Văn Hiên	Member	1967	—	Hưng Yên	Undergraduate	Kinh	Male	
Trần Thị Hiền	Nonmember	1972	—	—	—	Kinh	Female	
Nguyễn Sỹ Hiệp	Nonmember	1974	—	Ninh Bình	Graduate	Kinh	Male	
Phan Chí Hiếu	Nonmember	1969	2001	Ninh Bình	Graduate	Kinh	Male	
Bùi Thị Minh Hoài	Member	1965	1991	Ninh Bình	Graduate	Kinh	Female	
Nguyễn Thị Hồng	Member	1968	1999	Hà Nội	Graduate	Kinh	Female	
Đoàn Minh Huấn	Member	1971	1995	Hà Tĩnh	Postgraduate	Kinh	Male	
Lê Mạnh Hùng	Nonmember	1973	2007	Hưng Yên	Graduate	Kinh	Male	
Lê Quốc Hùng	Member	1966	1991	Huế	Postgraduate	Kinh	Male	
Nguyễn Mạnh Hùng	Member	1962	1984	Bắc Ninh	Graduate	Kinh	Male	
Trịnh Việt Hùng	Alternate	1977	2004	Hải Phòng	Postgraduate	Kinh	Male	
Lê Minh Hưng	Member	1970	2000	Hà Tĩnh	Graduate	Kinh	Male	
Nguyễn Đức Hưng	Nonmember	1970	—	Ninh Bình	—	Kinh	Male	
Trần Tiến Hưng	Member	1976	1997	Hà Tĩnh	Postgraduate	Kinh	Male	
Bùi Quang Huy	Alternate	1977	2002	Nghệ An	Graduate	Kinh	Male	
Dương Quốc Huy	Nonmember	1974	2006	Hưng Yên	Graduate	Kinh	Male	
Y Thanh Hà Niê Kđăm	Member	1973	2000	Đắk Lắk	Graduate	Êđê	Male	
Nguyễn Đình Khang	Member	1967	1995	Bắc Ninh	Graduate	Kinh	Male	
Hoàng Quốc Khánh	Nonmember	1969	1999	Sơn La	Graduate	Thái	Male	
Trần Việt Khoa	Member	1965	1985	Phú Thọ	Postgraduate	Kinh	Male	
Vũ Trung Kiên	Nonmember	1974	—	Hưng Yên	—	Kinh	Male	
Tô Lâm	Member	1957	1981	Hưng Yên	Postgraduate	Kinh	Male	
Nguyễn Ngọc Lâm	Nonmember	1973	—	Nghệ An	Graduate	Kinh	Male	
Nguyễn Thanh Lâm	Nonmember	1972	2002	Hà Nội	Undergraduate	Kinh	Male	
Trần Thanh Lâm	Nonmember	1973	—	Ninh Bình	Graduate	Kinh	Male	
Nguyễn Duy Lâm	Nonmember	1972	2000	Thái Nguyên	Graduate	Kinh	Male	
Đào Hồng Lan	Member	1971	2001	Hải Phòng	Graduate	Kinh	Female	
Trần Văn Lâu	Nonmember	1970	1989	Cần Thơ	Graduate	Kinh	Male	
Hầu A Lềnh	Member	1973	1994	Lào Cai	Graduate	Hmong	Male	
Trịnh Mạnh Linh	Nonmember	1978	—	Ninh Bình	Graduate	Kinh	Male	
Nguyễn Hồng Lĩnh	Member	1964	1986	Tây Ninh	Undergraduate	Kinh	Male	
Nguyễn Phước Lộc	Nonmember	1970	1996	An Giang	Graduate	Kinh	Male	
Lê Văn Lợi	Nonmember	1974	—	Nghệ An	Postgraduate	Kinh	Male	
Nguyễn Phi Long	Alternate	1976	1998	Lào Cai	Graduate	Kinh	Male	
Nguyễn Văn Long	Nonmember	1974	1996	Bắc Ninh	Graduate	Kinh	Male	
Nguyễn Thị Thanh Mai	Member	1974	2010	Quảng Ngãi	Graduate	Kinh	Female	
Phan Văn Mãi	Member	1973	1997	Vĩnh Long	Postgraduate	Kinh	Male	
Lâm Văn Mẫn	Member	1970	1998	Cần Thơ	Postgraduate	Khmer	Male	
Trần Thanh Mẫn	Member	1962	1982	Cần Thơ	Postgraduate	Kinh	Male	
Lê Quang Mạnh	Member	1974	2001	Hà Nội	Postgraduate	Kinh	Male	
Lê Quốc Minh	Member	1969	2002	Nghệ An	Undergraduate	Kinh	Male	
Trần Hồng Minh	Member	1967	—	Hà Nội	Postgraduate	Kinh	Male	
Võ Văn Minh	Nonmember	1972	1998	Hồ Chí Minh	Graduate	Kinh	Male	
Hồ Văn Mừng	Alternate	1977	2002	Khánh Hòa	Postgraduate	Kinh	Male	
Hồ Văn Mười	Nonmember	1969	1993	Đà Nẵng	Graduate	Kinh	Male	
Phạm Hoài Nam	Member	1967	—	Gia Lai	Postgraduate	Kinh	Male	
Hà Thị Nga	Member	1969	1995	Phú Thọ	Undergraduate	Thái	Female	
Lê Thị Nga	Member	1964	1990	Hà Tĩnh	Graduate	Kinh	Female	
Lê Minh Ngân	Nonmember	1969	1994	Quảng Trị	Graduate	Kinh	Male	
Nguyễn Thanh Nghị	Member	1976	1999	Cà Mau	Graduate	Kinh	Male	
Nguyễn Hữu Nghĩa	Member	1972	1999	Hà Nội	Graduate	Kinh	Male	
Nguyễn Trọng Nghĩa	Member	1962	1982	Đồng Tháp	Undergraduate	Kinh	Male	
Bùi Văn Nghiêm	Member	1966	1987	Vĩnh Long	Graduate	Kinh	Male	
Trần Thanh Nghiêm	Member	1970	—	Ninh Bình	Undergraduate	Kinh	Male	
Hoàng Văn Nghiệm	Nonmember	1968	1995	Lạng Sơn	Graduate	Tày	Male	
Nguyễn Quang Ngọc	Member	1968	1988	Ninh Bình	Undergraduate	Kinh	Male	
Nguyễn Duy Ngọc	Member	1964	1986	Hưng Yên	Postgraduate	Kinh	Male	
Nguyễn Thị Bích Ngọc	Nonmember	1971	2001	Nghệ An	Graduate	Kinh	Female	
Phạm Quang Ngọc	Nonmember	1973	2002	Ninh Bình	Postgraduate	Kinh	Male	
Thái Đại Ngọc	Member	1966	1987	Đà Nẵng	Undergraduate	Kinh	Male	
Chiêm Thống Nhất	Nonmember	1976	1995	Cần Thơ	Graduate	Kinh	Male	
Hồ Văn Niên	Member	1975	2000	Gia Lai	Undergraduate	Bahnar	Male	
Nguyễn Hải Ninh	Member	1976	1998	Hưng Yên	Postgraduate	Kinh	Male	
Đặng Xuân Phong	Member	1972	1999	Phú Thọ	Postgraduate	Kinh	Male	
Lê Quốc Phong	Member	1978	2000	Hà Nội	Postgraduate	Kinh	Male	
Trần Phong	Nonmember	1974	2000	Quảng Trị	Graduate	Kinh	Male	
La Công Phương	Nonmember	1972	—	Thái Nguyên	Graduate	Kinh	Male	
Nguyễn Văn Phương	Nonmember	1970	1996	Huế	Graduate	Kinh	Male	
Vũ Hải Quân	Member	1974	2012	Ninh Bình	Postgraduate	Kinh	Male	
Lê Hồng Quang	Member	1968	1997	An Giang	Postgraduate	Kinh	Male	
Trần Lưu Quang	Member	1967	1997	Tây Ninh	Undergraduate	Kinh	Male	
Lê Ngọc Quang	Member	1974	2002	Thanh Hóa	Undergraduate	Kinh	Male	
Lương Tam Quang	Member	1965	1998	Hưng Yên	Undergraduate	Kinh	Male	
Nguyễn Văn Quảng	Member	1969	1994	Hải Phòng	Postgraduate	Kinh	Male	
Thái Thanh Quý	Member	1976	2002	Nghệ An	Postgraduate	Kinh	Male	
Trịnh Văn Quyết	Member	1966	—	Hải Phòng	Undergraduate	Kinh	Male	
Nguyễn Văn Quyết	Nonmember	1972	1996	Ninh Bình	Graduate	Kinh	Male	
Hoàng Minh Sơn	Nonmember	1969	2004	Hưng Yên	Postgraduate	Kinh	Male	
Nguyễn Kim Sơn	Member	1966	2000	Hải Phòng	Postgraduate	Kinh	Male	
Vũ Hồng Sơn	Nonmember	1971	—	Hà Nội	—	Kinh	Male	
Đỗ Tiến Sỹ	Member	1965	1993	Hưng Yên	Undergraduate	Kinh	Male	
Nguyễn Thành Tâm	Member	1974	2000	Tây Ninh	Postgraduate	Kinh	Male	
Lê Đức Thái	Member	1967	—	Quảng Ninh	Undergraduate	Kinh	Male	
Trần Hồng Thái	Nonmember	1974	—	Hà Tĩnh	Postgraduate	Kinh	Male	
Nguyễn Hồng Thái	Member	1969	1987	Hưng Yên	Undergraduate	Kinh	Male	
Nguyễn Khắc Thận	Nonmember	1974	1997	Hưng Yên	Graduate	Kinh	Male	
Nguyễn Trường Thắng	Member	1970	—	Hồ Chí Minh	Undergraduate	Kinh	Male	
Nguyễn Văn Thắng	Member	1973	2003	Hà Nội	Postgraduate	Kinh	Male	
Phạm Tất Thắng	Member	1970	1996	Hải Phòng	Postgraduate	Kinh	Male	
Tào Đức Thắng	Nonmember	1973	2000	Thanh Hóa	Graduate	Kinh	Male	
Trần Đức Thắng	Member	1973	2002	Phú Thọ	Postgraduate	Kinh	Male	
Vũ Đại Thắng	Member	1975	2005	Hải Phòng	Graduate	Kinh	Male	
Lâm Thị Phương Thanh	Member	1967	1989	Ninh Bình	Postgraduate	Kinh	Female	
Nguyễn Thị Thanh	Member	1967	1988	Ninh Bình	Postgraduate	Kinh	Female	
Trần Sỹ Thanh	Member	1971	1995	Nghệ An	Graduate	Kinh	Male	
Đồng Văn Thanh	Nonmember	1969	1989	Cần Thơ	Graduate	Kinh	Male	
Đinh Hữu Thành	Nonmember	1977	—	Quảng Trị	Graduate	Kinh	Male	
Nghiêm Xuân Thành	Member	1969	1994	Phú Thọ	Graduate	Kinh	Male	
Lê Xuân Thế	Nonmember	1970	—	Vĩnh Long	Graduate	Kinh	Male	
Lê Xuân Thuận	Nonmember	1971	—	Hải Phòng	—	Kinh	Male	
Lê Thị Thủy	Member	1964	1993	Nghệ An	Graduate	Kinh	Female	
Nguyễn Huy Tiến	Nonmember	1968	1994	Hưng Yên	Graduate	Kinh	Male	
Trương Thiên Tô	Nonmember	1970	—	Quảng Ngãi	Graduate	Kinh	Male	
Đặng Khánh Toàn	Nonmember	1971	—	Hải Phòng	Graduate	Kinh	Male	
Nguyễn Khắc Toàn	Nonmember	1970	1998	Khánh Hòa	Graduate	Kinh	Male	
Lê Tấn Tới	Member	1969	1993	Cà Mau	Postgraduate	Kinh	Male	
Phạm Thị Thanh Trà	Member	1962	1993	Nghệ An	Graduate	Kinh	Female	
Nguyễn Hải Trâm	Nonmember	1975	2001	Phú Thọ	Graduate	Kinh	Female	
Lê Minh Trí	Member	1960	1984	Hồ Chí Minh	Undergraduate	Kinh	Male	
Hà Quốc Trị	Nonmember	1969	1990	Phú Thọ	Graduate	Kinh	Male	
Lương Nguyễn Minh Triết	Alternate	1976	2002	Đà Nẵng	Graduate	Kinh	Male	
Lê Hoài Trung	Member	1961	1986	Huế	Postgraduate	Kinh	Male	
Nguyễn Đình Trung	Member	1973	1995	Nghệ An	Graduate	Kinh	Male	
Trịnh Xuân Trường	Nonmember	1977	2004	Ninh Bình	Graduate	Kinh	Male	
Trần Cẩm Tú	Member	1961	1990	Hà Tĩnh	Postgraduate	Kinh	Male	
Ngô Văn Tuấn	Member	1971	1998	Bắc Ninh	Graduate	Kinh	Male	
Nguyễn Anh Tuấn	Member	1979	2001	Thanh Hóa	Postgraduate	Kinh	Male	
Phạm Anh Tuấn	Nonmember	1973	1997	Hà Tĩnh	Postgraduate	Kinh	Male	
Trần Huy Tuấn	Nonmember	1974	2002	Lào Cai	Graduate	Tày	Male	
Vương Quốc Tuấn	Alternate	1977	2004	Bắc Ninh	Postgraduate	Kinh	Male	
Phạm Gia Túc	Nonmember	1965	1989	Ninh Bình	Graduate	Kinh	Male	
Hoàng Thanh Tùng	Nonmember	1966	2000	Nghệ An	Graduate	Kinh	Male	
Phạm Thế Tùng	Nonmember	1972	1996	Hưng Yên	Graduate	Kinh	Male	
Đỗ Xuân Tùng	Nonmember	1970	—	Phú Thọ	—	Kinh	Male	
Lê Quang Tùng	Member	1971	2003	Phú Thọ	Undergraduate	Kinh	Male	
Lê Văn Tuyến	Nonmember	1973	1998	Hà Nội	Postgraduate	Kinh	Male	
Nguyễn Thị Tuyến	Member	1971	1995	Hà Nội	Postgraduate	Kinh	Female	
Bùi Thị Quỳnh Vân	Member	1974	1999	Quảng Ngãi	Graduate	Kinh	Female	
Vũ Hồng Văn	Nonmember	1976	2005	Hưng Yên	Postgraduate	Kinh	Male	
Nguyễn Đắc Vinh	Member	1972	2003	Nghệ An	Postgraduate	Kinh	Male	
Nguyễn Minh Vũ	Alternate	1976	2001	Hà Nội	Postgraduate	Kinh	Male	
Võ Thị Ánh Xuân	Member	1970	1994	An Giang	Graduate	Kinh	Female	
Dương Trung Ý	Nonmember	1971	1998	Bắc Ninh	Graduate	Kinh	Male	
Hồ Thị Hoàng Yến	Nonmember	1971	1993	Vĩnh Long	Undergraduate	Kinh	Female	

=== Alternates ===
Alternates of the 14th Central Committee of the Communist Party of Vietnam
Name	13th CC	Birth	PM	Birthplace	Education	Ethnicity	Gender	Ref.
Nguyễn Hải Anh	Nonmember	1980	—	Ninh Bình	—	Kinh	Male	
Nguyễn Tuấn Anh	Nonmember	1983	2012	Quảng Ngãi	Postgraduate	Kinh	Male	
Nguyễn Mạnh Cường	Nonmember	1979	2000	An Giang	Graduate	Kinh	Male	
Trần Duy Đông	Nonmember	1979	2008	Thanh Hóa	Postgraduate	Kinh	Male	
Bùi Quốc Dũng	Nonmember	1979	2011	Ninh Bình	Postgraduate	Kinh	Male	
Nguyễn Huy Dũng	Nonmember	1983	—	Hà Nội	Graduate	Kinh	Male	
Nguyễn Minh Dũng	Nonmember	1980	2002	Vĩnh Long	Graduate	Kinh	Male	
Bùi Thế Duy	Alternate	1978	—	Hà Tĩnh	Postgraduate	Kinh	Male	
Vũ Mạnh Hà	Alternate	1979	2003	Ninh Bình	Postgraduate	Kinh	Male	
Lê Hải Hòa	Nonmember	1980	2013	Nghệ An	Postgraduate	Kinh	Male	
U Huấn	Alternate	1980	2006	Quảng Ngãi	Graduate	Xơ Đăng	Male	
Đỗ Hữu Huy	Nonmember	1980	—	Hải Phòng	Graduate	Kinh	Male	
Nguyễn Hồng Phong	Nonmember	1979	—	Phú Thọ	Postgraduate	Kinh	Male	
Bùi Hoàng Phương	Nonmember	1983	—	Ninh Bình	—	Kinh	Male	
Trần Quân	Nonmember	1983	2011	Ninh Bình	Postgraduate	Kinh	Male	
Trần Đăng Quỳnh	Nonmember	1979	—	Thanh Hóa	Postgraduate	Kinh	Male	
Nguyễn Minh Triết	Nonmember	1988	2009	Cà Mau	Postgraduate	Kinh	Male	
Hồ Xuân Trường	Nonmember	1979	2001	Phú Thọ	Graduate	Kinh	Male	
Bùi Anh Tuấn	Nonmember	1980	—	Hà Tĩnh	Postgraduate	Kinh	Male	
Mùa A Vảng	Alternate	1983	2006	Điện Biên	Graduate	Hmong	Male	
