= Alternates of the 12th Central Committee of the Communist Party of Vietnam =

12th Central Committee
- Symbol of the Communist Party of Vietnam

27 January 2016 – 31 January 2021 (5 years, 4 days) Overview
- Type: Central Committee of the Communist Party of Vietnam
- Election: 12th National Congress

Alternates
- Total: 20 alternates
- Newcomers: 17 alternates (12th)
- Old: 3 alternates (11th)
- Reelected: 16 alternates (13th)

On 27 January 2016, the 12th National Congress elected 20 people to serve as alternates of the 12th Central Committee of the Communist Party of Vietnam (CPV) for the electoral term 2016–2021. The Central Committee is the highest decision-making institution in the CPV and Vietnam when the Party's National Congress and the Politburo are adjourned. In between two congresses, the Central Committee is responsible for organising and directing the implementation of the Party's Political Platform, Charter and resolutions adopted at the National Congress. It decides on guidelines and policies in all relevant fields, domestic or foreign. The sitting Central Committee is responsible for convening the next National Congress. Alternates are party cadres who have the right to speak and attend meetings of the Central Committee but do not have the right to vote. They are 45 years of age or younger and undergo long-term political education to prepare them for future assignments and election as a member of the Central Committee. Candidates for alternates need to meet the same standards as Central Committee members. Work assignments of alternates are decided upon by the Politburo. Lastly, alternates are responsible to and report on their work to the Central Committee.

Alternates were transferred to several assisting roles after the 16th National Congress. For instance, alternate Bùi Nhật Quang was appointed Vice President of the Vietnam Academy of Social Sciences (VASS) on 8 March 2016, while Đoàn Minh Huấn was appointed deputy editor-in-chief of the Central Committee's theoretical journal Tạp chí Cộng sản. Six months after his appointment, on 21 September, Đoàn Minh Huấn was appointed the journal's editor-in-chief. For Bùi Nhật Quang it took three years to go from deputy to leader, and he was appointed President of the VASS on 11 November 2019. Other alternates held leadership posts in mass organisations, such as Lê Quốc Phong, who was elected as First Secretary of the Central Committee of the Hồ Chí Minh Communist Youth Union on 21 April 2016. Several members served as leaders of provincial committees, such as Ngô Đông Hải and Đào Hồng Lan, who led the Thái Bình Provincial Party Committee and the Bắc Ninh Provincial Party Committee respectively. Đào Hồng Lan became the first female party leader of Thái Bình province. Another female first was accomplished by Bùi Thị Quỳnh Vân, who became the first women to serve as both Deputy Secretary and Secretary of the Quảng Ngãi Provincial Party Committee. Some alternates held leading posts in provincial legislatures, such as Thái Thanh Quý, who served as Chairman of the Nghệ An Provincial People's Committee, and others in the state, such as Vũ Đại Thắng, who served as Deputy Minister of Planning and Investment.

Of the 20 alternates, Lê Quốc Phong was the youngest one at 38 years of age. Three alternates were female (Đào Hồng Lan, Châu Thị Mỹ Phương and Bùi Thị Quỳnh Vân), all but three were graduates (Hồ Văn Niên, Bùi Chí Thành and Nguyễn Khắc Toàn) and three had ethnic minority background (Hồ Văn Niên, Y Thanh Hà Niê Kdăm and Lâm Văn Mẫn). Ngô Đông Hải, Lâm Văn Mẫn and Nguyễn Khắc Toàn had served as alternates of the 11th Central Committee in 2011–2016. Of these three, Ngô Đông Hải and Lâm Văn Mẫn were elected as members of the 13th Central Committee (13th CC). Furthermore, all but four alternates (Nguyễn Khắc Toàn, Nguyễn Văn Hiếu, Châu Thị Mỹ Phương and Bùi Chí Thành) were elected members of the 13th CC.

== Alternates ==
Alternates of the 12th Central Committee of the Communist Party of Vietnam
| Name | 11th | 13th | Birth | PM | Birthplace | Education | Ethnicity | Gender | Ref. |
|---|---|---|---|---|---|---|---|---|---|
| Nguyễn Hữu Đông | Nonmember | Member | 1972 | 1995 | Phú Thọ | Graduate | Kinh | Male | |
| Ngô Đông Hải | Alternate | Member | 1970 | 1998 | Bình Định | Graduate | Kinh | Male | |
| Nguyễn Văn Hiếu | Nonmember | Nonmember | 1976 | 1996 | Bình Định | Graduate | Kinh | Male | |
| Đoàn Minh Huấn | Nonmember | Member | 1971 | 1995 | Hà Tĩnh | Graduate | Kinh | Male | |
| Y Thanh Hà Niê Kdăm | Nonmember | Member | 1973 | 2000 | Đắk Lắk | Graduate | Êđê | Male | |
| Đặng Quốc Khánh | Nonmember | Member | 1976 | 2002 | Hà Tĩnh | Graduate | Kinh | Male | |
| Đào Hồng Lan | Nonmember | Member | 1971 | 2001 | Hải Dương | Graduate | Kinh | Female | |
| Lâm Văn Mẫn | Alternate | Member | 1970 | 1998 | Sóc Trăng | Graduate | Khmer | Male | |
| Hồ Văn Niên | Nonmember | Member | 1975 | 2000 | Gia Lai | Undergraduate | Bahnar | Male | |
| Nguyễn Hải Ninh | Nonmember | Member | 1976 | 1998 | Hưng Yên | Graduate | Kinh | Male | |
| Lê Quốc Phong | Nonmember | Member | 1978 | 2000 | Hà Nội | Graduate | Kinh | Male | |
| Châu Thị Mỹ Phương | Nonmember | Nonmember | 1975 | 1997 | Tiền Giang | Graduate | Kinh | Female | |
| Bùi Nhật Quang | Nonmember | Member | 1975 | 2003 | Hà Nội | Graduate | Kinh | Male | |
| Thái Thanh Quý | Nonmember | Member | 1976 | 2002 | Nghệ An | Graduate | Kinh | Male | |
| Nguyễn Văn Thắng | Nonmember | Member | 1973 | 2003 | Hà Nội | Graduate | Kinh | Male | |
| Vũ Đại Thắng | Nonmember | Member | 1975 | 2005 | Hà Nội | Graduate | Kinh | Male | |
| Bùi Chí Thành | Nonmember | Nonmember | 1974 | 1995 | Bà Rịa-Vũng Tàu | Undergraduate | Kinh | Male | |
| Nguyễn Khắc Toàn | Alternate | Nonmember | 1970 | 1999 | Khánh Hòa | Undergraduate | Kinh | Male | |
| Lê Quang Tùng | Nonmember | Member | 1971 | 2003 | Hà Tĩnh | Graduate | Kinh | Male | |
| Bùi Thị Quỳnh Vân | Nonmember | Member | 1974 | 1999 | Quảng Ngãi | Graduate | Kinh | Female | |
