= 13th Central Committee of the Communist Party of Vietnam =

Central Committee of the Communist Party of Vietnam

13th Central Committee of the Communist Party of Vietnam Ban Chấp hành Trung ương Đảng Cộng sản Việt Nam khóa XIII
- Symbol of the Communist Party of Vietnam

30 January 2021 – 22 January 2026 (4 years, 357 days) Overview
- Type: Central Committee of the Communist Party of Vietnam
- Election: 13th National Congress

Leadership
- General Secretary: Tô Lâm (2024–present); Nguyễn Phú Trọng (2021–24)
- Permanent Member: Trần Cẩm Tú (2024–present); Lương Cường (2024); Trương Thị Mai (2023–24); Võ Văn Thưởng (2021–23)
- Politburo: 16 members
- Secretariat: 11 members

Members
- Total: 180 members
- Newcomers: 61 members (13th)
- Old: 103 members 16 alternates (12th)

Alternates
- Total: 20 alternates
- Newcomers: 20 alternates (13th)

The 13th Central Committee of the Communist Party of Vietnam (CPV) was elected by the 13th National Congress, and remained in session until the election of the 14th Central Committee on 22 January 2026. It elected, at its 1st Plenary Session, the Politburo, about half of the membership of the Secretariat and the Central Inspection Commission of the 13th term.

== Plenums ==
The Central Committee is not a permanent institution. Instead, it convenes plenary sessions between party congresses. When the CC is not in session, decision-making powers are delegated to the internal bodies of the CC itself; that is, the Politburo and the Secretariat. None of these organs are permanent bodies either; typically, they convene several times a month.

Plenary Sessions of the 13th Central Committee
| Plenum | Date | Length | Ref. |
|---|---|---|---|
| 1st Plenary Session | 31 January 2021 | 1 day | |
| 2nd Plenary Session | 8–9 March 2021 | 2 days | |
| 3rd Plenary Session | 5–8 July 2021 | 4 days | |
| 4th Plenary Session | 4–7 October 2021 | 4 days | |
| 5th Plenary Session | 4–10 May 2022 | 7 days | |
| 1st Extraordinary Plenary Session | 6 June 2022 | 1 day | |
| 6th Plenary Session | 3–9 October 2022 | 7 days | |
| 2nd Extraordinary Plenary Session | 30 December 2022 | 1 day | |
| 3rd Extraordinary Plenary Session | 17 January 2023 | 1 day | |
| 4th Extraordinary Plenary Session | 1 March 2023 | 1 day | |
| 7th Plenary Session | 15–17 May 2023 | 3 days | |
| 8th Plenary Session | 2–8 October 2023 | 7 days | |
| 5th Extraordinary Plenary Session | 31 January 2024 | 1 day | |
| 6th Extraordinary Plenary Session | 20 March 2024 | 1 day | |
| 7th Extraordinary Plenary Session | 26 April 2024 | 1 day | |
| 9th Plenary Session | 16–18 May 2024 | 3 days | |
| 8th Extraordinary Plenary Session | 21 June 2024 | 1 day | |
| 9th Extraordinary Plenary Session | 3 August 2024 | 1 day | |
| 10th Extraordinary Plenary Session | 16 August 2024 | 1 day | |
| 10th Plenary Session | 18–20 September 2024 | 3 days | |
| 11th Extraordinary Plenary Session | 25 November 2024 | 0.5 days | |
| 12th Extraordinary Plenary Session | 23–24 January 2025 | 1.5 days | |
| 11th Plenary Session | 10–12 April 2025 | 3 days | |
| 12th Plenary Session | 18–19 July 2025 | 2 days | |
| 13th Plenary Session | 6–8 October 2025 | 3 days | |
| 14th Plenary Session | 5–6 November 2025 | 1.5 days | |
| 15th Plenary Session | 22–23 December 2025 | 2 days | |

== Organisation ==
=== Working Organs ===
Organs of the 13th Central Committee of the Communist Party of Vietnam
| Institution | Leader | Took office | Left office | Length of tenure | Gender | Ref. |
|---|---|---|---|---|---|---|
| Board of Healthcare Services for Senior Officials | Nguyễn Thị Kim Tiến | 30 January 2021 | 19 November 2021 | 293 days | Female | |
| Board of Healthcare Services for Senior Officials | Nguyễn Thanh Long | 19 November 2021 | 7 June 2022 | 200 days | Male | |
| Policy and Strategy Commission (Economic Commission before 3 February 2025) | Nguyễn Văn Bình | 30 January 2021 | 6 February 2021 | 7 days | Male | |
| Policy and Strategy Commission (Economic Commission before 3 February 2025) | Trần Tuấn Anh | 6 February 2021 | 31 January 2024 | 2 years and 359 days | Male | |
| Policy and Strategy Commission (Economic Commission before 3 February 2025) | Trần Lưu Quang | 16 August 2024 | Incumbent | 2 years and 93 days | Male | |
| External Affairs Commission (liquidated 3 February 2025) | Hoàng Bình Quân | 30 January 2021 | 18 March 2021 | 47 days | Male | |
| External Affairs Commission (liquidated 3 February 2025) | Lê Hoài Trung | 18 March 2021 | 3 February 2025 | 3 years and 322 days | Male | |
| Information, Education and Mass Mobilization Commission (established from the Information and Education Commission 3 February 2025) | Võ Văn Thưởng | 30 January 2021 | 19 February 2021 | 20 days | Male | |
| Information, Education and Mass Mobilization Commission (established from the Information and Education Commission 3 February 2025) | Nguyễn Trọng Nghĩa | 19 February 2021 | Incumbent | 5 years and 271 days | Male | |
| Inspection Commission | Trần Cẩm Tú | 30 January 2021 | 23 January 2025 | 3 years and 359 days | Male | |
| Inspection Commission | Nguyễn Duy Ngọc | 23 January 2025 | Incumbent | 1 year and 298 days | Male | |
| Internal Affairs Commission | Phan Đình Trạc | 30 January 2021 | Incumbent | 5 years and 291 days | Male | |
| Nhân Dân | Thuận Hữu | 30 January 2021 | 19 May 2021 | 109 days | Male | |
| Nhân Dân | Lê Quốc Minh | 19 May 2021 | Incumbent | 5 years and 182 days | Male | |
| Office of the Central Committee | Lê Minh Hưng | 30 January 2021 | 3 June 2024 | 3 years and 125 days | Male | |
| Office of the Central Committee | Nguyễn Duy Ngọc | 3 June 2024 | 3 February 2025 | 245 days | Male | |
| Office of the Central Committee | Lê Hoài Trung | 3 February 2025 | Incumbent | 1 year and 287 days | Male | |
| Organisation Commission | Phạm Minh Chính | 30 January 2021 | 7 April 2021 | 67 days | Male | |
| Organisation Commission | Trương Thị Mai | 7 April 2021 | 16 May 2024 | 3 years and 39 days | Female | |
| Organisation Commission | Lê Minh Hưng | 16 May 2024 | Incumbent | 2 years and 185 days | Male | |
| Mass Mobilization Commission (merged with the Information and Education Commission 3 Februarty 2025) | Trương Thị Mai | 30 January 2021 | 7 April 2021 | 67 days | Female | |
| Mass Mobilization Commission (merged with the Information and Education Commission 3 Februarty 2025) | Bùi Thị Minh Hoài | 7 April 2021 | 17 July 2024 | 3 years and 101 days | Female | |
| Mass Mobilization Commission (merged with the Information and Education Commission 3 Februarty 2025) | Mai Văn Chính | 16 August 2024 | 3 February 2025 | 171 days | Male | |
| Theoretical Council | Nguyễn Xuân Thắng | 30 January 2021 | Incumbent | 5 years and 291 days | Male | |

=== Committees directly under the Central Committee ===
Committees directly under the 13th Central Committee the Communist Party of Vietnam
| Institution | Leader | Took office | Left office | Length of tenure | Gender | Ref. |
|---|---|---|---|---|---|---|
| Agencies' Bloc Committee | Huỳnh Tấn Việt | 30 January 2021 | 6 October 2022 | 1 year and 249 days | Male | |
| Agencies' Bloc Committee | Nguyễn Văn Thể | 21 October 2022 | Incumbent | 4 years and 27 days | Male | |
| Enterprises Bloc Committee | Y Thanh Hà Niê Kdăm | 30 January 2021 | 6 August 2021 | 188 days | Male | |
| Enterprises Bloc Committee | Nguyễn Long Hải | 6 August 2021 | Incumbent | 5 years and 103 days | Male | |
| Military Commission | Nguyễn Phú Trọng | 30 January 2021 | 19 July 2024 | 3 years and 171 days | Male | |
| Military Commission | Tô Lâm | 3 August 2024 | Incumbent | 2 years and 106 days | Male | |
| Public Security Committee | Tô Lâm | 30 January 2021 | 11 June 2024 | 3 years and 133 days | Male | |
| Public Security Committee | Lương Tam Quang | 11 June 2024 | Incumbent | 2 years and 159 days | Male | |

== Composition ==
=== Members ===
Members of the 13th Central Committee of the Communist Party of Vietnam
| Name | 12th CC | 14th CC | Birth | PM | Education | Ethnicity | Gender | Ref. |
|---|---|---|---|---|---|---|---|---|
| Dương Văn An | Nonmember | Nonmember | 1971 | 1997 | Postgraduate | Kinh | Male | |
| Chu Ngọc Anh | Member | Nonmember | 1965 | 1998 | Postgraduate | Kinh | Male | |
| Nguyễn Doãn Anh | Nonmember | Member | 1967 | 1987 | Postgraduate | Kinh | Male | |
| Nguyễn Hoàng Anh | Member | Member | 1963 | 1994 | Postgraduate | Kinh | Male | |
| Nguyễn Thụy Anh | Member | Nonmember | 1963 | 1994 | Postgraduate | Kinh | Female | |
| Trần Tuấn Anh | Member | Nonmember | 1964 | 1996 | Postgraduate | Kinh | Male | |
| Đỗ Thanh Bình | Nonmember | Member | 1967 | 1990 | Postgraduate | Kinh | Male | |
| Dương Thanh Bình | Member | Nonmember | 1961 | 1981 | Undergraduate | Kinh | Male | |
| Nguyễn Hòa Bình | Member | Nonmember | 1958 | 1981 | Postgraduate | Kinh | Male | |
| Bùi Minh Châu | Member | Nonmember | 1961 | 1993 | Postgraduate | Kinh | Male | |
| Lê Tiến Châu | Nonmember | Member | 1969 | 1998 | Postgraduate | Kinh | Male | |
| Đỗ Văn Chiến | Member | Member | 1962 | 1986 | Postgraduate | Sán Dìu | Male | |
| Hoàng Xuân Chiến | Member | Nonmember | 1961 | — | Postgraduate | Kinh | Male | |
| Hoàng Duy Chinh | Nonmember | Nonmember | 1968 | 1995 | Postgraduate | Tày | Male | |
| Mai Văn Chính | Member | Nonmember | 1961 | 1987 | Postgraduate | Kinh | Male | |
| Phạm Minh Chính | Member | Nonmember | 1958 | 1986 | Postgraduate | Kinh | Male | |
| Bùi Văn Cường | Member | Nonmember | 1965 | 1992 | Undergraduate | Kinh | Male | |
| Lương Cường | Member | Nonmember | 1957 | 1978 | Undergraduate | Kinh | Male | |
| Ngô Chí Cường | Nonmember | Member | 1967 | 1992 | Undergraduate | Kinh | Male | |
| Nguyễn Mạnh Cường | Nonmember | Member | 1973 | 1999 | Postgraduate | Kinh | Male | |
| Nguyễn Phú Cường | Member | Nonmember | 1967 | 1995 | Postgraduate | Kinh | Male | |
| Nguyễn Tân Cương | Member | Member | 1966 | — | Undergraduate | Kinh | Male | |
| Phan Việt Cường | Member | Nonmember | 1963 | 1988 | Undergraduate | Kinh | Male | |
| Trần Quốc Cường | Member | Nonmember | 1961 | 1985 | Postgraduate | Kinh | Male | |
| Vũ Đức Đam | Member | Nonmember | 1963 | 1993 | Postgraduate | Kinh | Male | |
| Nguyễn Văn Danh | Member | Nonmember | 1962 | 1981 | Undergraduate | Kinh | Male | |
| Huỳnh Thành Đạt | Member | Nonmember | 1962 | 1990 | Postgraduate | Kinh | Male | |
| Nguyễn Hồng Diên | Member | Member | 1965 | 1985 | Postgraduate | Kinh | Male | |
| Nguyễn Khắc Định | Member | Member | 1964 | 1988 | Postgraduate | Kinh | Male | |
| Lương Quốc Đoàn | Nonmember | Member | 1970 | — | Undergraduate | Kinh | Male | |
| Nguyễn Quốc Đoàn | Nonmember | Member | 1975 | 1998 | Postgraduate | Kinh | Male | |
| Nguyễn Hữu Đông | Alternate | Member | 1972 | 1995 | Postgraduate | Kinh | Male | |
| Đào Ngọc Dung | Member | Nonmember | 1962 | 1984 | Postgraduate | Kinh | Male | |
| Đinh Tiến Dũng | Member | Nonmember | 1961 | 1987 | Postgraduate | Kinh | Male | |
| Hồ Quốc Dũng | Nonmember | Member | 1966 | 1994 | Postgraduate | Kinh | Male | |
| Hoàng Trung Dũng | Nonmember | Member | 1971 | 1994 | Postgraduate | Kinh | Male | |
| Nguyễn Chí Dũng | Member | Nonmember | 1960 | 1987 | Postgraduate | Kinh | Male | |
| Võ Văn Dũng | Member | Nonmember | 1960 | 1982 | Undergraduate | Kinh | Male | |
| Nguyễn Văn Được | Nonmember | Member | 1968 | 2000 | Postgraduate | Kinh | Male | |
| Nguyễn Quang Dương | Member | Nonmember | 1962 | 1984 | Undergraduate | Kinh | Male | |
| Phạm Đại Dương | Nonmember | Member | 1974 | 2005 | Postgraduate | Kinh | Male | |
| Đỗ Đức Duy | Nonmember | Nonmember | 1970 | 1999 | Postgraduate | Kinh | Male | |
| Nguyễn Văn Gấu | Nonmember | Member | 1967 | — | Undergraduate | Kinh | Male | |
| Phan Văn Giang | Member | Member | 1960 | — | Postgraduate | Kinh | Male | |
| Nguyễn Thị Thu Hà | Member | Member | 1970 | 1997 | Postgraduate | Kinh | Female | |
| Trần Hồng Hà | Member | Nonmember | 1963 | 1990 | Postgraduate | Kinh | Male | |
| Vũ Hải Hà | Nonmember | Member | 1969 | 1995 | Postgraduate | Kinh | Male | |
| Lê Khánh Hải | Nonmember | Member | 1966 | 1985 | Undergraduate | Kinh | Male | |
| Ngô Đông Hải | Alternate | Member | 1970 | 1998 | Postgraduate | Kinh | Male | |
| Nguyễn Đức Hải | Member | Nonmember | 1961 | 1984 | Postgraduate | Kinh | Male | |
| Nguyễn Thanh Hải | Member | Member | 1970 | 2002 | Postgraduate | Kinh | Female | |
| Nguyễn Tiến Hải | Nonmember | Member | 1965 | 1986 | Postgraduate | Kinh | Male | |
| Nguyễn Văn Hiền | Nonmember | Member | 1967 | — | Undergraduate | Kinh | Male | |
| Bùi Thị Minh Hoài | Member | Member | 1965 | 1991 | Postgraduate | Kinh | Female | |
| Lê Minh Hoan | Member | Nonmember | 1961 | 1988 | Postgraduate | Kinh | Male | |
| Nguyễn Thị Hồng | Nonmember | Member | 1968 | 1999 | Postgraduate | Kinh | Female | |
| Đoàn Minh Huấn | Alternate | Member | 1971 | 1995 | Postgraduate | Kinh | Male | |
| Vương Đình Huệ | Member | Nonmember | 1957 | 1984 | Postgraduate | Kinh | Male | |
| Lê Quốc Hùng | Nonmember | Member | 1966 | 1991 | Undergraduate | Kinh | Male | |
| Lữ Văn Hùng | Member | Nonmember | 1963 | 1981 | Undergraduate | Kinh | Male | |
| Nguyễn Mạnh Hùng | Member | Member | 1962 | 1984 | Postgraduate | Kinh | Male | |
| Nguyễn Văn Hùng | Member | Nonmember | 1961 | 1982 | Postgraduate | Kinh | Male | |
| Nguyễn Văn Hùng | Member | Nonmember | 1964 | 1993 | Postgraduate | Kinh | Male | |
| Đỗ Trọng Hưng | Nonmember | Nonmember | 1971 | 1992 | Postgraduate | Kinh | Male | |
| Lê Minh Hưng | Member | Member | 1970 | 2000 | Postgraduate | Kinh | Male | |
| Trần Tiến Hưng | Nonmember | Member | 1976 | 1997 | Postgraduate | Kinh | Male | |
| Lê Quang Huy | Nonmember | Nonmember | 1966 | 1991 | Postgraduate | Kinh | Male | |
| Y Thanh Hà Niê Kdăm | Alternate | Nonmember | 1973 | 2000 | Postgraduate | Êđê | Male | |
| Lê Minh Khái | Member | Nonmember | 1964 | 1990 | Postgraduate | Kinh | Male | |
| Nguyễn Đình Khang | Member | Member | 1967 | 1995 | Postgraduate | Kinh | Male | |
| Đặng Quốc Khánh | Alternate | Nonmember | 1976 | 2002 | Postgraduate | Kinh | Male | |
| Trần Việt Khoa | Member | Member | 1965 | 1985 | Postgraduate | Kinh | Male | |
| Điểu K'Ré | Member | Nonmember | 1968 | 1993 | Postgraduate | Mnong | Male | |
| Nguyễn Xuân Ký | Nonmember | Nonmember | 1972 | 1992 | Postgraduate | Kinh | Male | |
| Chẩu Văn Lâm | Member | Nonmember | 1967 | 1995 | Postgraduate | Tày | Male | |
| Tô Lâm | Member | Member | 1957 | 1981 | Postgraduate | Kinh | Male | |
| Đào Hồng Lan | Alternate | Member | 1971 | 2001 | Postgraduate | Kinh | Female | |
| Hoàng Thị Thúy Lan | Member | Nonmember | 1966 | 1995 | Postgraduate | Kinh | Female | |
| Hầu A Lềnh | Member | Member | 1973 | 1994 | Postgraduate | Hmong | Male | |
| Nguyễn Hồng Lĩnh | Member | Member | 1964 | 1986 | Undergraduate | Kinh | Male | |
| Nguyễn Văn Lợi | Member | Nonmember | 1961 | 1981 | Undergraduate | Kinh | Male | |
| Lê Thành Long | Member | Nonmember | 1963 | 1991 | Postgraduate | Kinh | Male | |
| Nguyễn Thanh Long | Nonmember | Nonmember | 1966 | 1999 | Postgraduate | Kinh | Male | |
| Võ Minh Lương | Member | Nonmember | 1963 | — | Undergraduate | Kinh | Male | |
| Lê Trường Lưu | Member | Nonmember | 1963 | 1992 | Postgraduate | Kinh | Male | |
| Trương Thị Mai | Member | Nonmember | 1958 | 1985 | Postgraduate | Kinh | Female | |
| Phan Văn Mãi | Member | Member | 1973 | 1997 | Postgraduate | Kinh | Male | |
| Lâm Văn Mẫn | Alternate | Member | 1970 | 1998 | Postgraduate | Khmer | Male | |
| Trần Thanh Mẫn | Member | Member | 1962 | 1982 | Postgraduate | Kinh | Male | |
| Lê Quang Mạnh | Nonmember | Member | 1974 | 2001 | Postgraduate | Kinh | Male | |
| Châu Văn Minh | Member | Nonmember | 1961 | 1996 | Postgraduate | Kinh | Male | |
| Lê Quốc Minh | Nonmember | Member | 1969 | 2002 | Undergraduate | Kinh | Male | |
| Phạm Bình Minh | Member | Nonmember | 1959 | 1984 | Postgraduate | Kinh | Male | |
| Trần Hồng Minh | Nonmember | Member | 1967 | — | Postgraduate | Kinh | Male | |
| Lại Xuân Môn | Member | Nonmember | 1963 | 1984 | Undergraduate | Kinh | Male | |
| Giàng Páo Mỷ | Member | Nonmember | 1963 | 1998 | Postgraduate | Hmong | Female | |
| Phạm Hoài Nam | Member | Member | 1967 | — | Postgraduate | Kinh | Male | |
| Trần Văn Nam | Member | Nonmember | 1963 | 1986 | Undergraduate | Kinh | Male | |
| Nguyễn Văn Nên | Member | Nonmember | 1957 | 1978 | Undergraduate | Kinh | Male | |
| Hà Thị Nga | Nonmember | Member | 1969 | 1995 | Undergraduate | Thái | Female | |
| Lê Thị Nga | Member | Member | 1964 | 1990 | Postgraduate | Kinh | Female | |
| Nguyễn Thanh Nghị | Member | Member | 1976 | 1991 | Postgraduate | Kinh | Male | |
| Nguyễn Hữu Nghĩa | Nonmember | Member | 1972 | 1999 | Postgraduate | Kinh | Male | |
| Nguyễn Trọng Nghĩa | Member | Member | 1962 | 1982 | Undergraduate | Kinh | Male | |
| Bùi Văn Nghiêm | Nonmember | Member | 1966 | 1987 | Postgraduate | Kinh | Male | |
| Trần Thanh Nghiêm | Nonmember | Member | 1970 | — | Undergraduate | Kinh | Male | |
| Nguyễn Duy Ngọc | Nonmember | Member | 1964 | 1986 | Postgraduate | Kinh | Male | |
| Nguyễn Quang Ngọc | Nonmember | Member | 1968 | 1988 | Undergraduate | Kinh | Male | |
| Thái Đại Ngọc | Nonmember | Member | 1966 | — | Undergraduate | Kinh | Male | |
| Hồ Văn Niên | Alternate | Member | 1975 | 2000 | Undergraduate | Bahnar | Male | |
| Nguyễn Hải Ninh | Alternate | Member | 1976 | 1998 | Postgraduate | Kinh | Male | |
| Hồ Đức Phớc | Member | Nonmember | 1963 | 1993 | Postgraduate | Kinh | Male | |
| Đặng Xuân Phong | Nonmember | Member | 1972 | 1999 | Postgraduate | Kinh | Male | |
| Đoàn Hồng Phong | Member | Nonmember | 1963 | 1993 | Postgraduate | Kinh | Male | |
| Lê Quốc Phong | Alternate | Member | 1978 | 2000 | Postgraduate | Kinh | Male | |
| Nguyễn Thành Phong | Member | Nonmember | 1962 | 1988 | Postgraduate | Kinh | Male | |
| Nguyễn Xuân Phúc | Member | Nonmember | 1954 | 1982 | Undergraduate | Kinh | Male | |
| Trần Quang Phương | Member | Nonmember | 1961 | — | Undergraduate | Kinh | Male | |
| Vũ Hải Quân | Nonmember | Member | 1974 | 2012 | Postgraduate | Kinh | Male | |
| Trần Đức Quận | Nonmember | Nonmember | 1967 | 1989 | Postgraduate | Kinh | Male | |
| Bùi Nhật Quang | Alternate | Nonmember | 1975 | 2003 | Postgraduate | Kinh | Male | |
| Hoàng Đăng Quang | Member | Nonmember | 1961 | 1992 | Postgraduate | Kinh | Male | |
| Lê Hồng Quang | Member | Nonmember | 1968 | 1997 | Postgraduate | Kinh | Male | |
| Lê Ngọc Quang | Nonmember | Member | 1974 | 2002 | Undergraduate | Kinh | Male | |
| Lương Tam Quang | Nonmember | Member | 1965 | 1998 | Undergraduate | Kinh | Male | |
| Trần Lưu Quang | Member | Member | 1967 | 1997 | Undergraduate | Kinh | Male | |
| Nguyễn Văn Quảng | Nonmember | Member | 1969 | 1994 | Postgraduate | Kinh | Male | |
| Thái Thanh Quý | Alternate | Member | 1976 | 2002 | Postgraduate | Kinh | Male | |
| Trịnh Văn Quyết | Nonmember | Member | 1966 | — | Undergraduate | Kinh | Male | |
| Trần Văn Rón | Member | Nonmember | 1961 | 1981 | Undergraduate | Kinh | Male | |
| Vũ Hải Sản | Member | Nonmember | 1961 | 1983 | Undergraduate | Kinh | Male | |
| Bùi Thanh Sơn | Member | Nonmember | 1962 | 1986 | Postgraduate | Kinh | Male | |
| Nguyễn Kim Sơn | Nonmember | Member | 1966 | 2000 | Postgraduate | Kinh | Male | |
| Trần Văn Sơn | Member | Nonmember | 1961 | 1995 | Postgraduate | Kinh | Male | |
| Đỗ Tiến Sỹ | Member | Member | 1965 | 1993 | Undergraduate | Kinh | Male | |
| Nguyễn Thành Tâm | Nonmember | Member | 1974 | 2000 | Postgraduate | Kinh | Male | |
| Dương Văn Thái | Nonmember | Nonmember | 1970 | 1995 | Postgraduate | Kinh | Male | |
| Lê Đức Thái | Nonmember | Member | 1967 | — | Undergraduate | Kinh | Male | |
| Nguyễn Hồng Thái | Nonmember | Member | 1969 | 1987 | Undergraduate | Kinh | Male | |
| Phạm Xuân Thăng | Nonmember | Nonmember | 1966 | 1994 | Postgraduate | Kinh | Male | |
| Huỳnh Chiến Thắng | Member | Nonmember | 1965 | — | Undergraduate | Kinh | Male | |
| Nguyễn Trường Thắng | Nonmember | Member | 1970 | — | Undergraduate | Kinh | Male | |
| Nguyễn Văn Thắng | Alternate | Member | 1973 | 2003 | Postgraduate | Kinh | Male | |
| Nguyễn Xuân Thắng | Member | Nonmember | 1957 | 1983 | Postgraduate | Kinh | Male | |
| Phạm Tất Thắng | Nonmember | Member | 1970 | 1996 | Postgraduate | Kinh | Male | |
| Trần Đức Thắng | Nonmember | Member | 1973 | — | Postgraduate | Kinh | Male | |
| Vũ Đại Thắng | Alternate | Member | 1975 | 2005 | Postgraduate | Kinh | Male | |
| Lâm Thị Phương Thanh | Member | Member | 1967 | 1989 | Postgraduate | Kinh | Female | |
| Nguyễn Đức Thanh | Member | Nonmember | 1962 | 1989 | Undergraduate | Kinh | Male | |
| Nguyễn Thị Thanh | Member | Member | 1967 | 1988 | Postgraduate | Kinh | Female | |
| Phạm Viết Thanh | Member | Nonmember | 1962 | 1982 | Postgraduate | Kinh | Male | |
| Trần Sỹ Thanh | Member | Member | 1971 | 1995 | Postgraduate | Kinh | Male | |
| Vũ Hồng Thanh | Member | Nonmember | 1962 | 1998 | Postgraduate | Kinh | Male | |
| Lê Văn Thành | Member | Nonmember | 1962 | 1997 | Postgraduate | Kinh | Male | |
| Nghiêm Xuân Thành | Nonmember | Member | 1969 | 1994 | Postgraduate | Kinh | Male | |
| Nguyễn Văn Thể | Member | Nonmember | 1966 | 1993 | Postgraduate | Kinh | Male | |
| Lê Đức Thọ | Nonmember | Nonmember | 1970 | 1995 | Postgraduate | Kinh | Male | |
| Võ Văn Thưởng | Member | Nonmember | 1970 | 1993 | Postgraduate | Kinh | Male | |
| Lê Thị Thủy | Member | Member | 1964 | 1993 | Postgraduate | Kinh | Female | |
| Trần Quốc Tỏ | Member | Nonmember | 1962 | 1987 | Postgraduate | Kinh | Male | |
| Lê Tấn Tới | Nonmember | Member | 1969 | 1993 | Postgraduate | Kinh | Male | |
| Phạm Thị Thanh Trà | Member | Member | 1962 | 1993 | Postgraduate | Kinh | Female | |
| Phan Đình Trạc | Member | Nonmember | 1958 | 1980 | Undergraduate | Kinh | Male | |
| Dương Văn Trang | Member | Nonmember | 1961 | 1982 | Undergraduate | Kinh | Male | |
| Lê Minh Trí | Member | Member | 1960 | 1984 | Undergraduate | Kinh | Male | |
| Nguyễn Phú Trọng | Member | Nonmember | 1944 | 1968 | Postgraduate | Kinh | Male | |
| Lê Hoài Trung | Member | Member | 1961 | 1986 | Postgraduate | Kinh | Male | |
| Nguyễn Đình Trung | Nonmember | Member | 1973 | 1995 | Postgraduate | Kinh | Male | |
| Trần Cẩm Tú | Member | Member | 1961 | 1990 | Postgraduate | Kinh | Male | |
| Ngô Văn Tuấn | Nonmember | Member | 1971 | 1998 | Postgraduate | Kinh | Male | |
| Nguyễn Anh Tuấn | Nonmember | Member | 1979 | 2001 | Postgraduate | Kinh | Male | |
| Phạm Gia Túc | Nonmember | Member | 1965 | 1989 | Postgraduate | Kinh | Male | |
| Hoàng Thanh Tùng | Nonmember | Member | 1966 | 2000 | Postgraduate | Kinh | Male | |
| Lê Quang Tùng | Alternate | Member | 1971 | 2003 | Postgraduate | Kinh | Male | |
| Nguyễn Thị Tuyến | Nonmember | Member | 1971 | 1995 | Postgraduate | Kinh | Female | |
| Bùi Thị Quỳnh Vân | Alternate | Member | 1974 | 1999 | Postgraduate | Kinh | Female | |
| Huỳnh Tấn Việt | Member | Nonmember | 1962 | 1986 | Postgraduate | Kinh | Male | |
| Nguyễn Đắc Vinh | Member | Member | 1972 | 2003 | Postgraduate | Kinh | Male | |
| Lê Huy Vịnh | Member | Nonmember | 1961 | — | Postgraduate | Kinh | Male | |
| Võ Thị Ánh Xuân | Member | Member | 1970 | 1994 | Undergraduate | Kinh | Female | |

=== Alternates ===
Alternates of the 13th Central Committee
| Name | 12th CC | 14th CC | Birth | PM | Education | Ethnicity | Gender | Ref. |
|---|---|---|---|---|---|---|---|---|
| Nguyễn Hoài Anh | Nonmember | Member | 1977 | 2003 | Postgraduate | Kinh | Male | |
| Lê Hải Bình | Nonmember | Member | 1977 | — | Postgraduate | Kinh | Male | |
| Võ Chí Công | Nonmember | Nonmember | 1979 | 2007 | Undergraduate | Kinh | Male | |
| Bùi Thế Duy | Nonmember | Member | 1978 | — | Postgraduate | Kinh | Male | |
| Vũ Mạnh Hà | Nonmember | Member | 1979 | 2003 | Postgraduate | Kinh | Male | |
| Nguyễn Long Hải | Nonmember | Member | 1976 | 1998 | Postgraduate | Kinh | Male | |
| Tôn Ngọc Hạnh | Nonmember | Member | 1980 | 2002 | Postgraduate | Kinh | Female | |
| Nguyễn Văn Hiếu | Nonmember | Nonmember | 1976 | 1996 | Postgraduate | Kinh | Male | |
| U Huấn | Nonmember | Member | 1980 | 2006 | Undergraduate | Xo Dang | Male | |
| Trịnh Việt Hùng | Nonmember | Member | 1977 | 2004 | Postgraduate | Kinh | Male | |
| Bùi Quang Huy | Nonmember | Member | 1977 | 2002 | Postgraduate | Kinh | Male | |
| Nguyễn Phi Long | Nonmember | Member | 1976 | 1998 | Postgraduate | Kinh | Male | |
| Hồ Văn Mừng | Nonmember | Member | 1977 | 2003 | Postgraduate | Kinh | Male | |
| Phan Như Nguyện | Nonmember | Nonmember | 1976 | 2002 | Postgraduate | Kinh | Male | |
| Y Vinh Tơr | Nonmember | Nonmember | 1976 | 2004 | Postgraduate | Mnong | Male | |
| Lương Nguyễn Minh Triết | Nonmember | Member | 1976 | 2002 | Postgraduate | Kinh | Male | |
| Vương Quốc Tuấn | Nonmember | Member | 1977 | 2004 | Postgraduate | Kinh | Male | |
| Mùa A Vảng | Nonmember | Member | 1983 | 2006 | Postgraduate | Hmong | Male | |
| Huỳnh Quốc Việt | Nonmember | Nonmember | 1976 | 2003 | Postgraduate | Kinh | Male | |
| Nguyễn Minh Vũ | Nonmember | Member | 1976 | 2001 | Postgraduate | Kinh | Male | |
