= National Congress of the Communist Party of Vietnam =

Congress of the Party, every five years

National Congress of the Communist Party of Vietnam Đại hội đại biểu toàn quốc Đảng Cộng sản Việt Nam

Type
- Type: Party meeting
- Term limits: Five years
- Established: 1935

Leadership
- Authority: Constitution of Vietnam
- Jurisdiction: Communist Party of Vietnam

Elections
- First election: 1st Congress
- Last election: 14th Congress
- Next election: 15th Congress

Meeting place
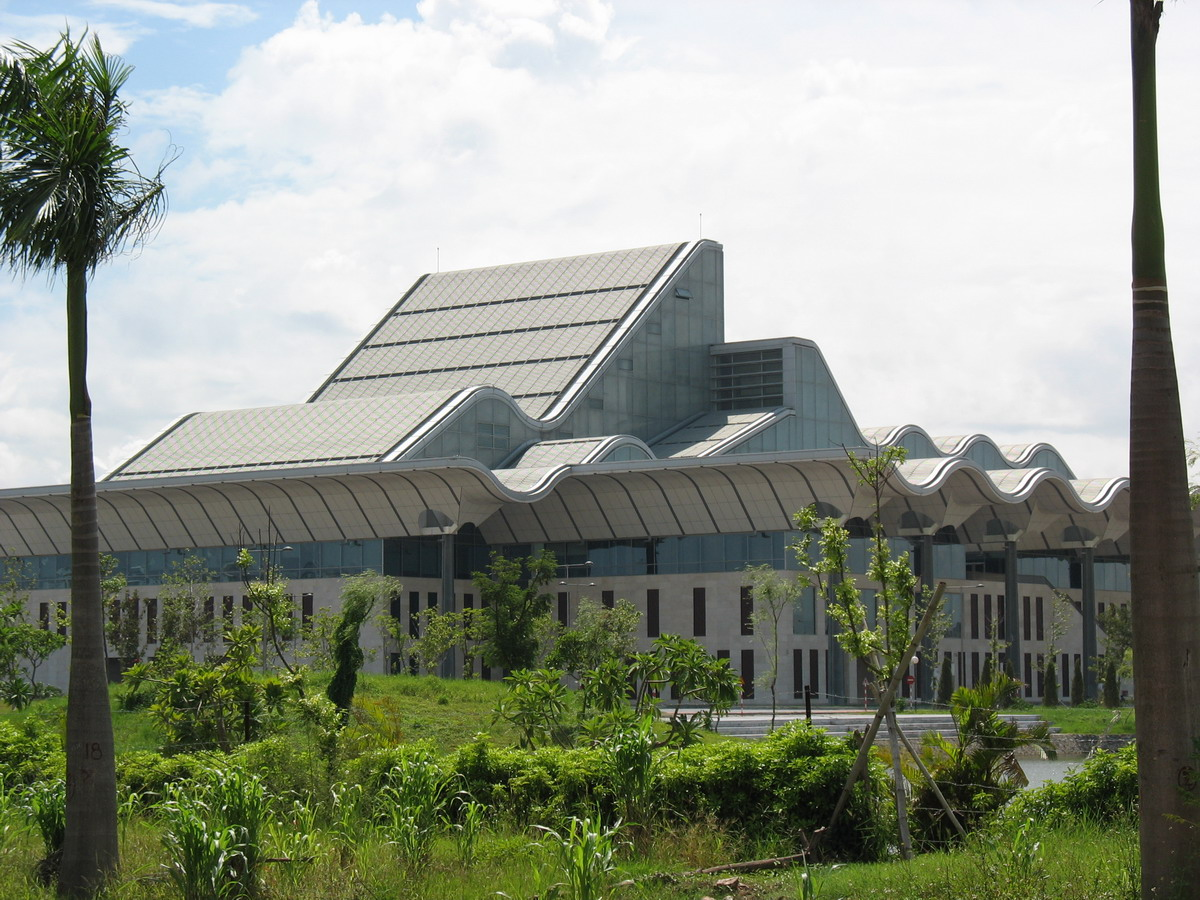
- Vietnam National Convention Center; Từ Liêm, Hanoi, Vietnam

Website
- https://daihoidangtoanquoc.vn/

The Communist Party of Vietnam is organized according to the Leninist principle of democratic centralism. The supreme party organ is the National Party Congress (Vietnamese: Đại hội đại biểu toàn quốc Đảng Cộng sản Việt Nam, lit. 'Congress of Nationwide Delegates of the Communist Party of Vietnam', commonly referred to as the Party Congress – Đại hội Đảng), which has been held every five years since 1976 (50 years ago).

Previously, due to the wartime conditions during the First Indochina War and the Vietnam War, the first four Congresses were not held on a regular schedule. Since its founding, 14 nationwide CPV Congresses have been convened.

The National Party Congress elects the Central Committee, consisting of 180 full members and 20 alternates. The Central Committee usually meets twice a year.

== Keys ==
Abbreviations
CC	Central Committee
Political Report	Political Report to the Central Committee, a document which briefs delegates about the period since the last congress and future work.
Platform	The party platform, in which the National Party Congress sets out the party's goals, Marxist perspective and political analysis of the times.
Charter	Charter of the Communist Party of Vietnam, the fundamental governing document of the CPV.
PMR	Party members represented at the congress by delegates (the party membership at the time).
FM	Full member (a member with voting rights).
AM	Alternate member (a member without voting rights).
VD	Voting delegate (a delegate with voting rights).
AD	Alternate delegate (a delegate without voting rights).

== Convocations ==
Congress	Duration (start—end)	Delegates	CC elected	Political Report (presented by)	Platform	Charter (changes)	PMR
1st National Party Congress; 4 days 1935 election	27 March – 30 March 1935	12	9 FM – 4 AM	—	"Theses on the Capitalist Democratic Revolution"	Amendment	600
2nd National Party Congress; 4 days 1950–1951 election	11 February – 19 February 1951	158 VD – 53 AD	19 FM – 10 AM	Trường Chinh	—	Amendment	766,349
3rd National Party Congress; 8 days 1960 election	5 September – 10 September 1960	525 VD – 51 AD	49 FM – 39 AM	Lê Duẩn	—	Amendment	500,000
4th National Party Congress; 9 days 1975–1976 election	14 December – 20 December 1976	1,008	101 FM – 32 AM	Lê Duẩn	—	Amendment	1,550,000
5th National Party Congress; 4 days 1981–1982 election	27 March – 31 March 1982	1,033	116 FM – 32 AM	Lê Duẩn	—	Amendment	1,727,000
6th National Party Congress; 4 days 1985–1986 election	15 December – 18 December 1986	1,129	124 FM – 49 AM	Trường Chinh	—	Amendment	~1,900,000
7th National Party Congress; 4 days 1990–1991 election	24 June – 27 June 1991	1,176	146	Nguyễn Văn Linh	"National Construction in the Transitional Period to Socialism"	Amendment	2,155,022
8th National Party Congress; 4 days 1995–1996 election	28 June – 1 July 1996	1,198	170	Đỗ Mười	Amendment	Amendment	2,155,022
9th National Party Congress; 4 days 2000–2001 election	19 April – 22 April 2001	1,168	150	Lê Khả Phiêu	Amendment	Amendment	2,479,719
10th National Party Congress; 8 days 2005–2006 election	18 April – 25 April 2006	1,176	160 FM – 21 AM	Nông Đức Mạnh	Amendment	Amendment	~3,100,000
11th National Party Congress; 8 days 2010–2011 election	12 January – 19 January 2011	1,377	175 FM – 25 AM	Nông Đức Mạnh	Amendment	Amendment	~3,600,000
12th National Party Congress; 9 days 2015–2016 election	20 January – 28 January 2016	1,510	180 FM – 20 AM	Nguyễn Phú Trọng	Amendment	Amendment	+4,500,000
13th National Party Congress; 8 days 2020–2021 election	25 January – 1 February 2021	1,587	180 FM – 20 AM	Nguyễn Phú Trọng	Two Centenaries	—	+5,000,000
14th National Party Congress; 4 days 2025–2026 election	19 January – 23 January 2026	1,588	180 FM – 20 AM	Tô Lâm	Two Centenaries	Amendment	TBD
