= 14th National Congress of the Communist Party of Vietnam =

2026 Communist Party of Vietnam conference

- Official poster
- Native name: Đại hội đại biểu toàn quốc lần thứ XIV của Đảng
- Date: 19–23 January 2026 (4 days)
- Location: Vietnam National Convention Center, Hanoi, Vietnam
- Also known as: 14th National Party Congress
- Theme: "Solidarity – Democracy – Discipline – Breakthrough – Development" (Vietnamese: Đoàn kết - Dân chủ - Kỷ cương - Đột phá - Phát triển)
- Participants: 1,586 delegates
- Outcome: Election of the 14th Central Committee of the Communist Party of Vietnam
- Footage: tinnguon.daihoidang.vn/en/
- Website: Official website

The 14th National Congress of the Communist Party of Vietnam (Vietnamese: Đại hội đại biểu toàn quốc lần thứ XIV của Đảng Cộng sản Việt Nam), less formally the 14th Party Congress (Đại hội XIV của Đảng), was held in the Vietnam National Convention Center in Hanoi from 19 to 23 January 2026. The National Congress, organized in accordance with the Party's charter, plays a decisive role in determining the direction of development, selecting high-level leadership personnel, and revising important documents for the 2026–2031 term. The National Congress is the highest organ of the Communist Party of Vietnam, and is stipulated to be held every five years. The 14th Congress had 1,586 delegates.

The preparations, which had begun in October 2023, for the 14th National Congress took place during the first 18 months of General Secretary Tô Lâm's tenure, who assumed power after the death of General Secretary Nguyễn Phú Trọng in July 2024. During this time, Vietnam witnessed large-scale administrative reforms, restructuring of administrative units and the state apparatus, and the promotion of the private sector while maintaining the state's leading role in the economy. These reforms received positive attention from investors but also sparked considerable domestic debate. The Congress elected the 14th Central Committee of the Communist Party of Vietnam for a five-year term. Tô Lâm remained General Secretary, the party's leader and the country's foremost political figure.

== Background ==
=== Charter ===
The Communist Party of Vietnam (CPV) was founded by Ho Chi Minh and is the ruling party of the Socialist Republic of Vietnam. According to the Party's charter, its highest leadership body is the National Congress. The National Congress has the rights to decide the number of Central Committee members, and is convened by the Central Committee on a regular basis every five years. The Central Committee can request that the National Congress be convened earlier or later than usual, though no later than one year. The 14th Congress was held as scheduled in January 2026.

=== Congress of Delegates at all levels ===
The Congress of Delegates at all levels (Vietnamese: Đại hội Đại biểu Đảng bộ các cấp) occurred in 2025, electing political leaders and members of local CPV committees for the 2025–2030 term.

== Preparations ==
At the 8th Plenary Session of the 13th Central Committee, held from 2 to 8 October 2023 in Hanoi, a decision was made to establish five subcommittees, including the Document Subcommittee chaired by General Secretary Nguyễn Phú Trọng. The Document Subcommittee is said to aim at "developing the Political Report and the Report summarizing the achievements and results of 40 years of reform" to be submitted to the 14th National Congress. Specifically, on 7 July, Plan Number 17 was also issued to develop a plan for the Central Committee, the Politburo, and the Secretariat of the 14th Party Congress. On 23 February 2024, at the Central Committee of the Communist Party of Vietnam, the first meeting of the Subcommittee on Documents for the 14th National Congress was held, chaired by Nguyễn Phú Trọng with Võ Văn Thưởng, Phạm Minh Chính, and Vương Đình Huệ in attendance. The Congress took place as Vietnam marked 40 years since the launch of the groundbreaking Đổi Mới reforms and 35 years of implementing the 1991 Platform, described as "for building the country during the transitional period to socialism." According to the Subcommittee, the 14th National Congress will also determine the directions, goals, and tasks for the next five years (2026–2030); review the 13th term; amend the Party Charter; and elect the 14th Central Committee. One of the stated goals is to transform Vietnam into a "developing country with modern industry and high middle income" by 2030 to celebrate the 100th anniversary of the Party's founding, and into a "developed country with high income" by 2045 when Vietnam celebrates its 100th anniversary.

At the 9th Plenary Session of the 13th Central Committee, held from 16 to 18 May 2024 in Hanoi, the conference discussed and provided feedback on the following contents: Detailed outline of the Political Report of the 13th Central Committee of the Communist Party of Vietnam at the 14th Congress; Detailed outline of the 5-year report on the implementation of the 10-year socio-economic development strategy (2021–2030), and the 5-year socio-economic development plan for the period 2026–2030; Outline of the report summarizing Party building work and the implementation of the Party Charter to be presented at the 14th Party Congress; Project summarizing Directive No. 35-CT/TW, dated 30 May 2019, of the Politburo and the draft Directive of the Politburo on Party congresses at all levels leading up to the 14th Party Congress. On 27 August 2024, General Secretary Tô Lâm, Head of the Subcommittee on Documents for the 14th Party Congress, chaired for the 2nd meeting of the Subcommittee on Documents, giving opinions on the draft Political Report prepared by the Editorial Team based on the detailed outline of the Political Report approved by the 9th Plenum of the 13th Central Committee of the Party. He proposed continuing to thoroughly understand the guiding ideas of former General Secretary Nguyễn Phú Trọng.

At the 10th Plenary Session of the 13th Central Committee, held from 18 to 20 September 2024 in Hanoi, the conference discussed and provided feedback on the following contents: Draft Political Report of the Central Committee of the 13th Party Congress; Draft Report summarizing some theoretical and practical issues on the socialist-oriented reform process in Vietnam over the past 40 years; Draft Report of the Central Committee of the 13th Party Congress on summarizing Party building work and the implementation of the Party Charter; Draft Report evaluating 5 years of implementing the 10-year socio-economic development strategy 2021–2030; directions and tasks for socio-economic development for the 5 years 2026–2030; The report summarizes the implementation of the Party's election regulations issued with Decision No. 244-QD/TW, dated 9 June 2014, of the 11th Central Committee, and the draft amendments and additions to the Party's election regulations; the draft summary of personnel work of the 13th Central Committee of the Party and the direction of personnel work of the 14th Central Committee of the Party; the introduction of the planning for the Politburo and the Secretariat of the 14th Party Congress, term 2026–2031; and the supplementary planning for the 14th Central Committee of the Party, term 2026–2031. On 11 November 2024, at the Party Central Headquarters, General Secretary To Lam chaired a meeting with the Document Subcommittee and the Party Charter Subcommittee to present to the 14th Party Congress. He emphasized and reached a consensus on the scale and significance of the 14th Party Congress. This Congress is closely linked to the context of the country after 40 years of implementing the Đổi Mới reforms, 50 years of Vietnam's reunification, 80 years of Vietnam's National Day, 95 years of the Party's founding, and looking forward to the 100th anniversary of the Party's founding, opening a new era of development: the Era of national rise of the Vietnam's resurgence.

On 23 October 2025, the Central Propaganda and Mass Mobilization Department announced the schedule for the 14th National Congress, to be held over seven days, from 19 to 25 January 2026, in Hanoi. However, on 21 January, the third day of the congress was confirmed to be shortened and concluded on 23 January.

=== Personnel changes and rotations before the 14th National Congress ===
On the morning of 10 January, the Ministry of Public Security, in coordination with the Hanoi Capital Command, held a preliminary rehearsal of the security plan for the 14th National Congress of the Communist Party of Vietnam at the Mỹ Đình National Stadium (Hanoi).

On 13 January, the Department of Motor Vehicles and Transportation held a ceremony to deploy 121 vehicles and transport delegates who are participating the National Congress.

On 14 January, the Ministry of Science and Technology launched a postage stamp titled "Welcome to the 14th National Congress of the Communist Party of Vietnam." On the same day in the afternoon, the Politburo announced the opening of the 14th National Congress of the Communist Party of Vietnam Press Center.

Prior to the congress, streets in many provinces and cities across Vietnam were decorated with flags and flowers, similar to what was seen in Hanoi, Ho Chi Minh City, Đắk Lắk, Huế, Da Nang, Lào Cai, etc. According to the plan, on 23 January, the Hanoi People's Committee organized the art and cultural program "Under the Glorious Banner of the Party", which included a 30-minute fireworks display at Mỹ Đình National Stadium. This is also considered the largest fireworks display ever held in Hanoi. However, the fireworks display was reportedly sponsored by Sun Group.

During the event, the congress was also provided with 1,586 tablets for all delegates to digitize documents, reducing the amount of printed materials by 1.6 million pages. In the main hall, the layout was also significantly changed compared to the previous 13th Congress. The floral arrangements that were present at the 13th Congress—such as the floral garland in front of the central stage with the inscription "Unity – Democracy – Discipline – Creativity – Development," the large floral garlands on either side of the center, the seating area for the Presidium members, and the speaker's podium—were completely removed in the 14th Congress. However, the cycad tree—symbolized as representing "eternal glory"—was largely retained on the central podium. Meanwhile, the speaker's podium has been moved from the right side of the stands (when viewed from the inside) to the center. Ho Chi Minh Statue at the 13th Congress, placed on the left side as viewed from the viewing platform, has been replaced with a full-body statue with his hand raised in a salute and placed in the center of the stage. According to BBC News Vietnamese, this implicitly confirms the importance placed on Ho Chi Minh Thought as an "indigenous ideology". At both the 13th and 14th Congresses, images of Karl Marx and Vladimir Lenin, along with the slogan "Long live the glorious Communist Party of Vietnam", were placed in the top position.

== The Congress ==
=== 19–20 January: Preparations and opening ceremony ===
Before the preparatory session for the 14th Party Congress officially takes place at the National Convention Center on 19 January, The delegation attending the congress visited and laid flowers at the Ho Chi Minh Mausoleum, and then offered incense at the Monument to the Heroes and Martyrs (Vietnamese: Đài tưởng niệm các anh hùng liệt sĩ). At the same time, before commencing the preparatory session, the congress also observed a minute of silence in memory of the former General Secretary Nguyễn Phú Trọng. along with two other Central Committee members who passed away during the 13th Congress. The preparatory session was opened by Trần Cẩm Tú, who stated the purpose of the meeting. Meanwhile, the session was chaired by Trần Thanh Mẫn. At the preparatory session, the Congress will consider and approve the session agenda, working regulations, official working program, election regulations of the 14th Congress, and the report on the verification of delegates' credentials. Simultaneously, delegates will elect the Presidium, the Secretariat, and the Credentials Verification Committee. Previously, three documents, including the Political Report, the Socio-Economic Report, and the Report on Party Building Summary, were merged into a single Political Report. At the end of the morning session of the preparatory meeting, the delegates voted to approve the agenda of the preparatory meeting, the rules of procedure, the work program for the entire term, and the election regulations of the Congress. During the session, Head of the Central Organizing Commission, Lê Minh Hưng presented and disseminated information related to the regulations on the organization and operation of the Congress. At the same time, there was unanimous agreement with a high percentage of "approval and consensus" regarding the Report on the Verification of Delegates' Credentials presented by the Credentials Verification Committee. This report confirmed that all 1,586 delegates summoned to attend fully met the standards and were eligible to participate in the 14th Congress. In addition, the Congress elected a Presidium consisting of 16 Politburo members, a Secretariat consisting of 5 members, and a Credentials Committee consisting of 13 members. In the afternoon of the preparatory day, delegates held group meetings to review and study the documents for the Congress.

On 20 January, the Opening Ceremony of the Congress was broadcast live on VTV1 of Vietnam Television at 08:00 (01:00 UTC). Along with the closing session, these were the only two sessions of the Congress that were televised live and allowed both domestic and international press to cover directly. The remaining working sessions took place in a closed format, with media coverage mainly conducted through the Congress Press Center and contacts and exchanges with delegates on the sidelines of the event. According to BBC News Vietnamese, information in the mainstream Vietnamese press was tightly controlled. In addition to the delegates, the opening session was also attended by 205 invited domestic guests, 111 ambassadors, representatives, and heads of diplomatic missions and international organizations in Vietnam. According to Reuters, delegates attending the conference will be provided with Samsung tablets, but without internet access, and will not be allowed to use mobile networks. They must remain in designated buildings. The tablets will only be able to access the internal network to work with private documents throughout the conference. Mobile network connectivity has also been disrupted at the conference center and surrounding areas. However, from Monday onwards, delegates were further prohibited from bringing mobile phones, even though mobile network interference had already prevented them from making external calls. Meanwhile, reporters covering the conference are prohibited from bringing mobile phones and can use personal computers if connected to the event's network.

Regarding the opening session, after Trần Cẩm Tú introduced the delegates, President Lương Cường delivered the opening speech, affirming that the 14th National Congress is of pivotal significance in the process of moving towards the 100th anniversary of the Party's founding, including "entering the new era". Also at this session, General Secretary Tô Lâm presented the reports of the 13th Central Committee on the documents submitted to the Congress. In that statement, Lâm also emphasized the need to "face the truth squarely and assess the situation accurately." At the same time, he set a target for Vietnam's annual growth rate of no less than 10% until 2030. Lâm also pledged to step up the anti-corruption campaign, although according to Reuters, this campaign has somewhat slowed down during his term compared to his predecessor, Nguyễn Phú Trọng, who wanted to expedite the approval of projects to boost growth.

=== 21 January: Discussion and approval of documents, personnel matters ===
Following the preparatory and opening sessions, the third day of the 14th Congress, starting on 21 January, began with closed-door meetings, this includes reading and discussing documents. The focus is on the Political Report presented by General Secretary Tô Lâm. Unlike previous sessions, this report is structured in a unified manner, combining three major contents: political orientation, socio-economic situation, and Party building work. The remaining three documents include: a report summarizing 40 years of Đổi Mới since 1986; a report reviewing the activities of the 13th Central Committee; and a report evaluating 15 years of implementing the Party Charter. These documents were translated into multiple languages to serve international guests. After the presentation, delegates discussed the documents in the main hall and in their respective delegations, contributing directly and listening to presentations from representatives of central and local agencies. The draft document was publicly released to solicit public opinion. The political report also addressed the national development strategy in the new period, with foreign policy being a key focus. Since the Đổi Mới period in 1986, Vietnam's foreign policy thinking has gradually expanded: from the principle of being friends with other countries, to readiness for integration, then to proactive and comprehensive integration, moving towards a multilateral and diversified approach to international relations. At the 14th National Congress, the foreign policy orientation was defined at a higher level, emphasizing the proactive role in multilateral diplomacy and participation in shaping international cooperation mechanisms.

Earlier that morning, Deputy Head of the Standing Committee of the Central Organization Department Hoàng Đăng Quang confirmed that the 14th National Congress would not be amending or supplementing the Party Charter. In the morning session, Lương Cường chaired the meeting on behalf of the Presidium, while the afternoon session was chaired by Trần Cẩm Tú. A total of 30 delegates from various delegations and agencies spoke that day. In the afternoon, the 14th National Congress also decided to shorten the working program to 1.5 days. This means that the 14th National Congress will conclude and close on 23 January instead of 25 January.

=== 22 January: Election of the Central Committee ===
The process begins with a member of the Presidium, usually the Head of the Central Organization Department, presenting the report of the 13th Central Committee on the personnel plan for the 14th Congress. The Congress will not directly elect the General Secretary, the Politburo, or the Secretariat, but will only elect the Central Committee The 14th Central Committee is expected to consist of 180 full members and 20 alternate members, similar to the previous two terms, and this number must be discussed and approved by the delegates. Afterward, delegates work in groups to discuss the list of personnel introduced by the 13th Central Committee. Delegates have the right to nominate or self-nominate additional candidates. This stage usually takes about one working session. In the next session, the Presidium compiles the list of additional nominations and self-nominations and sends it back to the groups for consideration of withdrawal. Politburo or Secretariat members not on the official nomination list must withdraw. Whether or not to accept the withdrawal is decided by the delegates through a vote. The list of candidates is divided into two groups: candidates for full members and candidates for alternate members. According to regulations, the number of surplus candidates cannot exceed 30%. Therefore, there can be a maximum of 234 candidates for full members and 26 candidates for alternate members. If this limit is exceeded, the Congress will continue the screening process until the allowed ratio is reached. The final list will be submitted to the Congress for approval before the election takes place. The election of the executive committee takes place in one working session, followed by the vote counting process. Candidates must receive more than 50% of the valid votes to be elected. In practice, previous Congresses have shown that although most Politburo members seeking re-election are elected, some Central Committee members who were nominated did not receive enough votes. Some cases of supplementary nominations or non-delegate candidates have been elected, but to date, no independent candidate has been successfully elected.

On the afternoon and evening of the session, the National Congress held an election to elect the 14th Central Committee. The Congress elected 200 members, including 180 full members and 20 alternate members. 13 members of the 13th Central Committee did not seek re-election. Most importantly, Prime Minister Phạm Minh Chính; Deputy Prime Minister Trần Hồng Hà, Nguyễn Hòa Bình; and President Lương Cường did not seek re-election, thus ending the term.

=== 23 January: Election of the General Secretary and closing session ===
==== Election of the General Secretary ====
After the completion of the election of the 14th Central Committee, the new Central Committee will hold its first meeting to elect the Politburo and other important leadership positions. This meeting is convened and chaired by Tô Lâm, the General Secretary of the 13th Central Committee. According to the Party's election regulations, members have the right to nominate and run for office; however, the list of personnel is mainly prepared in advance by the previous Central Committee. At this meeting, the 14th Central Committee will decide the number of Politburo members, usually ranging from 17 to 19. Of the approximately 200 Central Committee members, only full members participate in the voting. After the Politburo is elected, the Central Committee will continue to elect the General Secretary from among the newly elected Politburo members. Also at the first Central Committee meeting, the Central Committee will elect the Chairman of the Central Inspection Commission and several members of the Secretariat. A portion of the Secretariat members, including the General Secretary and the Standing Committee of the Secretariat, will be appointed by the Politburo. According to BBC News Vietnamese, the personnel for the position of General Secretary were essentially agreed upon at the 15th Central Committee meeting of the 13th Party Congress in December 2025.

On the morning of the session, the 14th Central Committee unanimously elected Tô Lâm, General Secretary of the 13th Central Committee, to continue serving as General Secretary of the 14th Central Committee.

==== Closing session and press conference ====
On the afternoon of 23 January, the new General Secretary and the new Central Committee was introduced. The session of the Congress was broadcast live on VTV1 of Vietnam Television at 14:00 (07:00 UTC).

== Public opinion ==
=== Before the Congress ===
Leading up to the party congress, the topic of party leadership personnel always attracts the attention of political analysts and the public, especially in the context of the closely watched balance of influence between the military and the police, along with speculation about the power distribution scenario. The two largest influential groups in the 14th Party Congress are mentioned as the faction associated with the police sector and the faction related to the military and the network of defense enterprises. Although the Party sets age limits, exceptions can still be applied for "special cases". Personnel allocation is also said to consider regional factors to maintain a relative balance. Since the Central Party Congress took place at the end of September 2025, unofficial information related to key positions in the Ministry of National Defense and the potential for individuals within this Ministry to hold leadership positions in the Communist Party of Vietnam has been discussed on social media. Among them, Minister of National Defence Phan Văn Giang, along with Deputy Minister and Chief of the General Staff Nguyễn Tân Cương and Head of the General Political Department Trịnh Văn Quyết, are some of the names in the Ministry of National Defence that are mentioned most frequently.

== Analysis ==
=== Political commentary ===
Before the Congress took place, according to Bloomberg News, Tô Lâm was on track to secure a full five-year term as General Secretary and could also concurrently hold the position of President of Vietnam, the ceremonial head of state. However, the possibility of him holding both positions simultaneously was considered uncertain, but if it did happen, it could quell simmering opposition to policies implemented by Lâm. According to Carlyle Alan Thayer, professor emeritus at the University of New South Wales, holding both positions at the same time would give Tô Lâm unprecedented power to act on many issues that had previously been separated. According to him, if he continues to receive the trust of the Party Central Committee, he will quickly proceed with implementing his action program and strengthen the leadership role of the Party Central Committee Secretariat. Citing unnamed officials and diplomats, The New York Times reported that internal discussions within the Party regarding the nomination list revealed Tô Lâm as the sole candidate for both the positions of General Secretary and President. Meanwhile, President Lương Cường, who comes from the Ministry of Defense, is expected to retire. The newspaper also suggests that if Tô Lâm succeeds in holding both roles, it would mark the marginalization of the military – the most powerful faction since the war.

Meanwhile, according to Reuters, the finalization of personnel for the top leadership of the Communist Party of Vietnam was completed at the 15th Plenum of the 13th Party Congress in December 2025. Citing sources from delegates, Tô Lâm was supported to continue as General Secretary. However, according to political practice in Vietnam, official information on personnel will only be announced at the 14th Party Congress, which takes place from 19 to 25 January. Nevertheless, the news of his continued term has been positively received by international investors. For foreign partners, this process shows the continuity of policy and the level of political stability, although observations remain regarding the degree of power concentration and the long-term direction of reforms under the new term. Furthermore, according to Ted Osius, former United States Ambassador to Vietnam, the Congress is also a time for Tô Lâm to shape Vietnam's development direction for the next decade. He believes that this leader prioritizes economic growth and achievements as the foundation for ensuring the Party's ruling role, while being willing to be flexible, even exceeding current practices, to achieve that goal.

Lâm is seen as a transitional figure, potentially creating a more favorable environment for the development of the private sector. However, critics argue that the Party still places a heavy emphasis on centralized control. Despite low operational efficiency, many state-owned and favored enterprises continue to enjoy special privileges. Furthermore, new legal regulations have granted authorities greater power to detect and handle content deemed "anti-state", raising concerns that even accurate but unfavorable economic information could be targeted.

According to Nguyễn Khắc Giang, Visiting Fellow at the ISEAS – Yusof Ishak Institute, who describes it as a "conclave" that may prove to be "the most significant in a generation", the 14th Congress will determine whether Vietnam's single-party system can adapt to the demands of the contemporary era. The consolidation struggle was complicated by interlinked factional bargains. According to the commentary, the most powerful network remains that of Tô Lâm, which accommodates a southern faction linked to former Prime Minister Nguyễn Tấn Dũng and known for its reformist tendencies. In friction with this bloc are the military and propaganda apparatuses, led by Phan Văn Giang and known for their dogmatism. A third camp is the Nghệ An–Hà Tĩnh corridor, a region with longstanding revolutionary credentials, and associated with Trần Cẩm Tú. However, this is less about rival factions fighting for succession and more about maintaining system stability through power-sharing among multiple top leaders. There are also signs of a modest technocratic revival.

As the Congress concluded, a Council on Foreign Relations article observes that power in Vietnam is now concentrated in "one-man rule" under General Secretary Tô Lâm, marking a shift from the collective leadership of the 2000s and 2010s, and that he now holds greater responsibility for economic issues.

== Occurrences and controversies ==
To prepare for the Congress, starting on 14 January, the Hanoi Police implemented timed and restricted road closures for trucks and passenger vehicles.

According to Dân Trí newspaper, nearly 600 reporters and technicians from 113 domestic media outlets registered to cover the opening ceremony of the National Congress at the press center, an increase compared to the 13th National Congress. In addition, 79 reporters and press assistants from 43 foreign news agencies and international reporters from political parties and ruling parties also participated in reporting on the Congress. During the preparatory session on 19 January, many schools, from junior high schools to universities, academies, colleges, and vocational schools across the country, simultaneously held flag-raising ceremonies to welcome the 14th National Congress.

Previously, on 16 January, singer Anh Tú released the song "Dear Party (Having the Party in My Heart)" on the state-organized music show Forever Faithful to the Party. The song sparked controversy on social media, with some arguing that the lyrics referring to 1930 with the phrase "the whole army rose up" were inaccurate, as there was no regular army at the founding of the Vietnamese Communist Party. Furthermore, the song was criticized for its dry lyrics and melody, deemed "flattering". However, state-run media maintained that the song received "a shower of praise" for its meaningful lyrics.

=== Incidents ===
The military was accused of employing public opinion brigades with the aim of removing "harmful and toxic" content from social media in order to counter "personnel rumors". Ahead of the Party Congress, state media alleged that social-media claims referencing "internal leaks", "confidential sources", or "behind-the-scenes personnel revelations" were "embellished and fabricated". State media accused "hostile and reactionary forces" of deliberately "sowing doubt, smearing the credibility of the leadership, and distorting the Party's policies and line," while "advancing plots against the Party and the State."

Human Rights Watch reports that Vietnamese authorities have stepped up arrests and legal actions against bloggers and activists perceived as critical of the government in the weeks before the Party Congress. According to The Independent, Tô Lâm has tightened state security by expanding police powers and intensifying rivalry with the army, which controls extensive economic interests. Meanwhile, the government stepped up its crackdown on dissent, arresting activists, journalists, lawyers, and critics.

=== Reactions ===
On the second day of the 14th National Congress, Bùi Thị Quỳnh Vân, a member of the Congress Secretariat, reported that as of 19 January, the Congress had received a total of 559 congratulatory letters and telegrams from 109 political parties, 6 international and regional organizations, 16 individuals, 122 people's organizations, and 306 associations and groups of overseas Vietnamese. According to the Congress Secretariat's report, among these were congratulatory messages from ruling parties and communist parties of neighboring countries and traditional friends such as Laos, China, Cambodia, Cuba, and North Korea. In addition, the Congress also received many congratulatory messages from countries in Asia-Pacific, Europe, as well as individuals, political organizations, and people's organizations abroad. Leaders from several countries, including Cuba, Russia, Japan, Mongolia, Belarus, and Nicaragua, have sent congratulations to Tô Lâm.
