= Traditional Day of Vietnamese Students =

Vietnamese holiday on January 9

- Date: January 9, 1950
- Location: Vietnam
- Organized by: Vietnam National Union of Students
- Participants: Vietnamese students

The Traditional Day of Vietnamese Students (Vietnamese: Ngày Truyền thống học sinh sinh viên Việt Nam) is celebrated annually on January 9th to commemorate the heroic student protest that occurred on this date in 1950. This day marks a pivotal moment in the patriotic struggle of students in Vietnam, particularly in the southern region, and symbolizes their courage and resilience. The event honors the legacy of Trần Văn Ơn and the contributions of all students who fought against colonial rule. Established by the Fifth National Congress of the Vietnam National Union of Students in 1993, this day underscores the enduring spirit and unity of the Vietnamese student community.

== Historical background ==
In the 19th century, Western capitalist countries, including France, embarked on a period of imperialism and colonialism. Through missionaries and trade, the French gradually dominated Vietnam. This marked the first time in history that Vietnam faced the invasion of a Western country, ultimately becoming a semi-feudal colony under French control for nearly 100 years, from 1858 to 1945.

=== Context of student protests in Saigon in the early 1950s ===
==== Early movements (1925-1945) ====
From 1925 to 1945, under the guidance of Nguyen Ai Quoc (later known as Ho Chi Minh), patriotic student organizations such as Student Union Organization, Ngo Quyen Team, and General Association Students emerged, leading student movements under the leadership of the Party and President Hồ Chí Minh. These organizations played crucial roles in the fight for independence and the formation of the first Party cells, and many of their members later became prominent figures in the Communist Party.

==== Vietnam's August Revolution (1945) ====
- After the Cochinchina Uprising of 1940, despite numerous difficulties due to increased French repression, sweeps, and suppression of the patriotic movement, southern students continued to enthusiastically participate in the anti-French resistance.
- Millions of young people, students, and pupils joined revolutionary organizations such as Vanguard Youth, National Salvation Youth Union, and the Viet Minh, participating in the seizure of power during the August Revolution.
- The August Revolution of 1945, led by the Communist Party and President Hồ Chí Minh, achieved complete victory. This success was the result of a long, arduous, and sacrificial struggle, in which young people, students, and pupils made significant contributions, with countless examples of bravery and resilience recorded in the nation's history.

==== Post-August Revolution (1945-1950) ====
- After the August Revolution, students actively engaged in education, training, and the resistance against French colonial forces, focusing on eradicating illiteracy, combating hunger, and fighting invaders.
- From 1947 to 1949, student resistance organizations were established in Saigon, Hue, and Hanoi, spreading across all regions of the country. These activities became increasingly diverse and dynamic, with significant contributions to the movement.
- On November 9, 1949, students in Hue went on strike to protest repression, followed by students in Saigon on November 22, 1949, who organized commemorations and demanded educational reforms. Concurrently, students in Hanoi protested against French and puppet government.
- By November 25, 1949, Chu Van An students joined the strikes, demanding the release of detained peers with slogans "students on strike", "free our friends", and "down with the puppets."
- By November 1949, strikes had extended to many schools, particularly at Marie Curie and Chasseloup schools, involving significant student participation. The Director of Education in Saigon ordered the arrest of 12 students, claiming that "the strike had political motives."

==== January 9, 1950 ====
On January 9th 1950, the National Salvation Youth Union and the Student Union of Saigon – Cho Lon mobilized and organized over 2000 students from various schools such as Petrus Ky, Gia Long, Nguyen Van Khue, Huynh Khuong Ninh..., along with many teachers and more than 10000 people. The crowd went to the Thu Hieu Palace (now the Ho Chi Minh City Museum) to demand the release of detained students and the cancellation of the school closure orders. At 1 PM on the same day, the French authorities mobilized 500 police officers and soldiers to attack the demonstrators. More than 30 students were seriously injured, some were arrested, and one of them - Trần Văn Ơn was killed.

In light of that historic event, and in recognition of the steadfast spirit of Trần Văn Ơn and the students during the early days of the resistance, the first National Congress of the Vietnam Youth Federation in February 1950 in Việt Bắc decided to designate January 9 each year as a traditional student day. The 5th National Congress of the Vietnamese Student Association (November 22 - 23, 1993) in Hanoi decided to take January 9 as the traditional day of the Vietnamese Student Association.

== Trần Văn Ơn ==
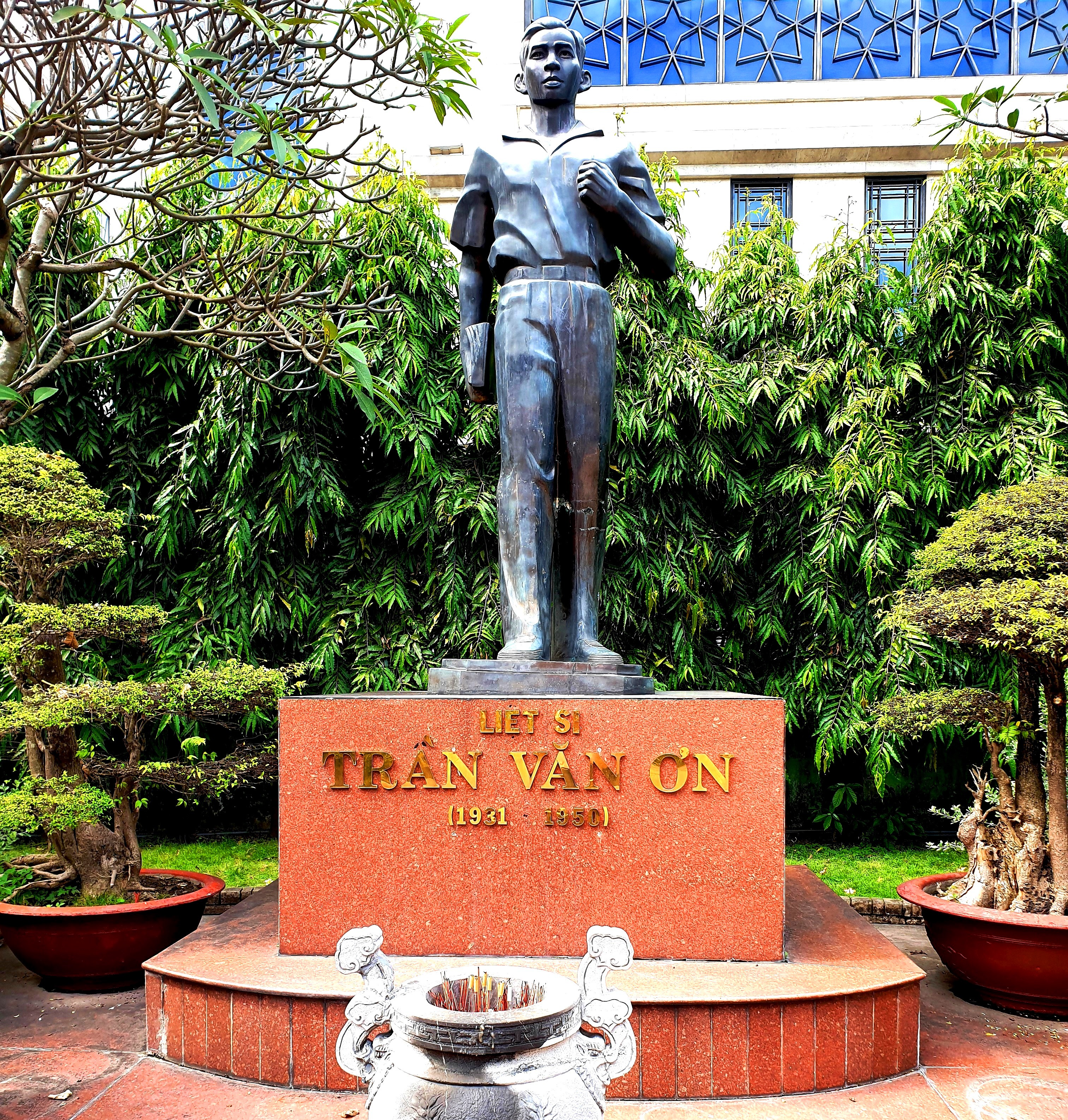

Trần Văn Ơn is a patriotic student at Pétrus Ky School. He played a crucial role in leading the student movement while preparing for his baccalaureate exam. At 16, he joined the patriotic student movement and became a secret member of the Inner City Resistance Student Union and the Vietnam - Southern Student Association. He was responsible for mobilizing students to oppose the French government and its supporters.

On January 9, 1950, Trần Văn Ơn and his friends vocally condemning the government's actions while shielding younger students. While assisting fellow student Ta Thi Thau, who had been rendered unconscious by the police, Trần Văn Ơn was struck in the stomach. He was shot while helping a student climb over a wall by using a pile of firewood. Trần Văn Ơn, along with other injured victims, was taken to Cho Ray Hospital for treatment and died at 3:30 PM that day. Trần Văn Ơn was just under 19 years old at the time of his death.

== Significance ==
=== Impact on US resistance war ===
During the resistance war against the United States, there were more significant events organized by students, such as "Three Readiness", "Five Volunteering", "Put Away the Books to Fight", "Sing for My People", "Rise Up and Go". There were more students participating in military activities, contributing to the war effort through various movements. These movements became emblematic of the patriotic spirit and dedication of Vietnamese students, who played a crucial role in the struggle for national independence and freedom.

=== Impact on the cause of national renovation ===
- Youth Movements: Many initiatives are conducted by the Youth Union, such as "Study and Train for Tomorrow's Career" and "Voluntary Student Movement."
- Volunteer Activities: Students participates in programs like "Supporting Exam Season," "Warm Winter," and "Green Summer."
- "Five Good Student Movement": Every year, on this day, HCYU Central Committee honors the titles of 'Three Good Students', 'Three Training Students', and 'Five Good Students' for outstanding students to promote good ethics, study, physical strength, volunteering, and integration. The title became a prestigious achievement and symbolized the exemplary image of new-generation students.
- Vietnam Student Association: For over 65 years, the Vietnam Student Association has been a political-social organization connecting students with the Party and the State. The movements have significantly contributed to the efforts of building and defending the country. The proud traditions of the Association include patriotism, a passion for learning, creativity, and mutual support among students.
