= Phạm Hoài Nam =

Admiral Phạm Hoài Nam
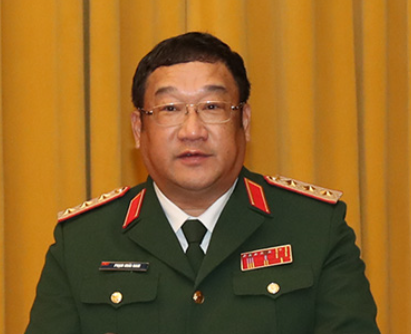
- Phạm Hoài Nam

Deputy Minister of National Defence
- Incumbent
- Assumed office 15 July 2020
- Minister of Defense: Phan Văn Giang

9th Commander of the Navy
- In office 14 June 2015 – 28 July 2020
- Preceded by: Nguyễn Văn Hiến
- Succeeded by: Trần Thanh Nghiêm

Personal details
- Born: February 21, 1967 (age 59) Hoai Nhon, Binh Dinh, Vietnam
- Education: Marine Engineer
- Alma mater: Military Technical Academy; Baku Naval Academy; Vietnam Naval Academy; The Army Academy; National Defense Academy; Ho Chi Minh National Academy of Politics; Central Officials Training Institute (South Korea)

Military service
- Allegiance: Vietnam
- Branch/service: Vietnam People's Navy
- Years of service: 1984–present
- Rank: Admiral
- Commands: Vietnam People's Navy

Pham Hoai Nam (born February 21, 1967) is a Vietnamese general, and Vice Minister of Defense.

Pham Hoai Nam was born on February 21, 1967, at Hoai Hao, Hoai Nhon, Binh Dinh, Vietnam. He joined the Communist Party of Vietnam in January 2011. He is a member of Central Committee of the Communist Party of Vietnam 12th, 13th; Congressman in National Assembly of Vietnam.

== Career ==
Pham Hoai Nam was born in Hoai Hao, Hoai Nhon, Binh Dinh province.

In 1990, he graduated on Baku Naval Academy. Returning home, he worked for the navy.

In 2009, he was appointed Deputy Commander cum Chief of Staff of Naval Region 4.

In 2012, he was appointed Commander of Naval Region 4.

In 2014, he was appointed Deputy Commander cum Chief of Staff of the Navy.

In 2015, he became Commander of the Navy

In 2018, he was promoted to the rank of vice admiral by President Tran Dai Quang.

In 2020, he was appointed Deputy Minister of Defense cum Navy Commander.

In 2021, he was promoted to the rank of Colonel General.
