= Bùi Quang Huy (politician) =

Vietnamese politician (born 1977)

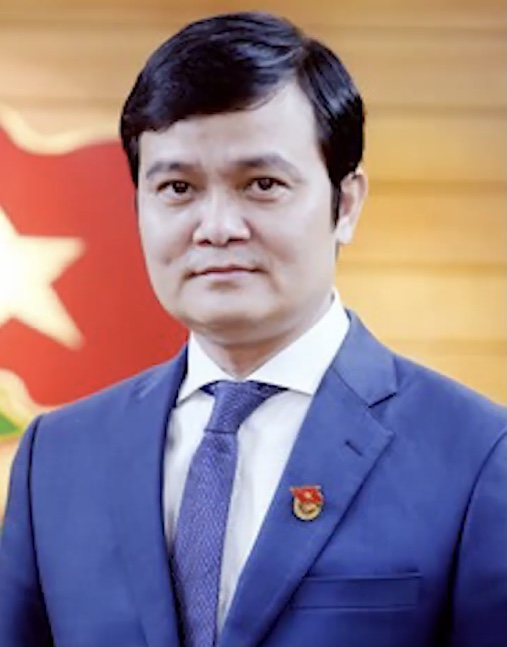
- Huy in 2022

First Secretary of the Central Committee of the Ho Chi Minh Communist Youth Union
- Incumbent
- Assumed office 25 August 2022
- Preceded by: Nguyễn Anh Tuấn

Personal details
- Born: 25 March 1977 (age 49)
- Party: Communist Party of Vietnam (since 2002)

Bùi Quang Huy (born 25 March 1977) is a Vietnamese politician serving as first secretary of the central committee of the Ho Chi Minh Communist Youth Union since 2022. He has been a member of the National Assembly since 2026.
