= 13th National Congress of the Communist Party of Vietnam =

2021 convention

- Date: 25 January 2021 – 1 February 2021
- Location: Vietnam National Convention Center, Hanoi
- Participants: 1,587 delegates
- Outcome: Election of the 13th Central Committee of the Communist Party of Vietnam
- Website: daihoi13.dangcongsan.vn

The 13th National Congress of the Communist Party of Vietnam (Vietnamese: Đại hội Đảng Cộng sản Việt Nam lần thứ XIII) was held in Vietnam National Convention Center, Hanoi from 25 January 2021 to 1 February 2021. It elected the 13th electoral term of the CPV Central Committee on 30 January 2021.
