= Vietnam National Convention Center =

Vietnamese convention centre in the Nam Từ Liêm district of Hanoi

Coordinates: 21°0′22″N 105°47′13″E

National Convention Center
- Trung tâm Hội nghị Quốc gia

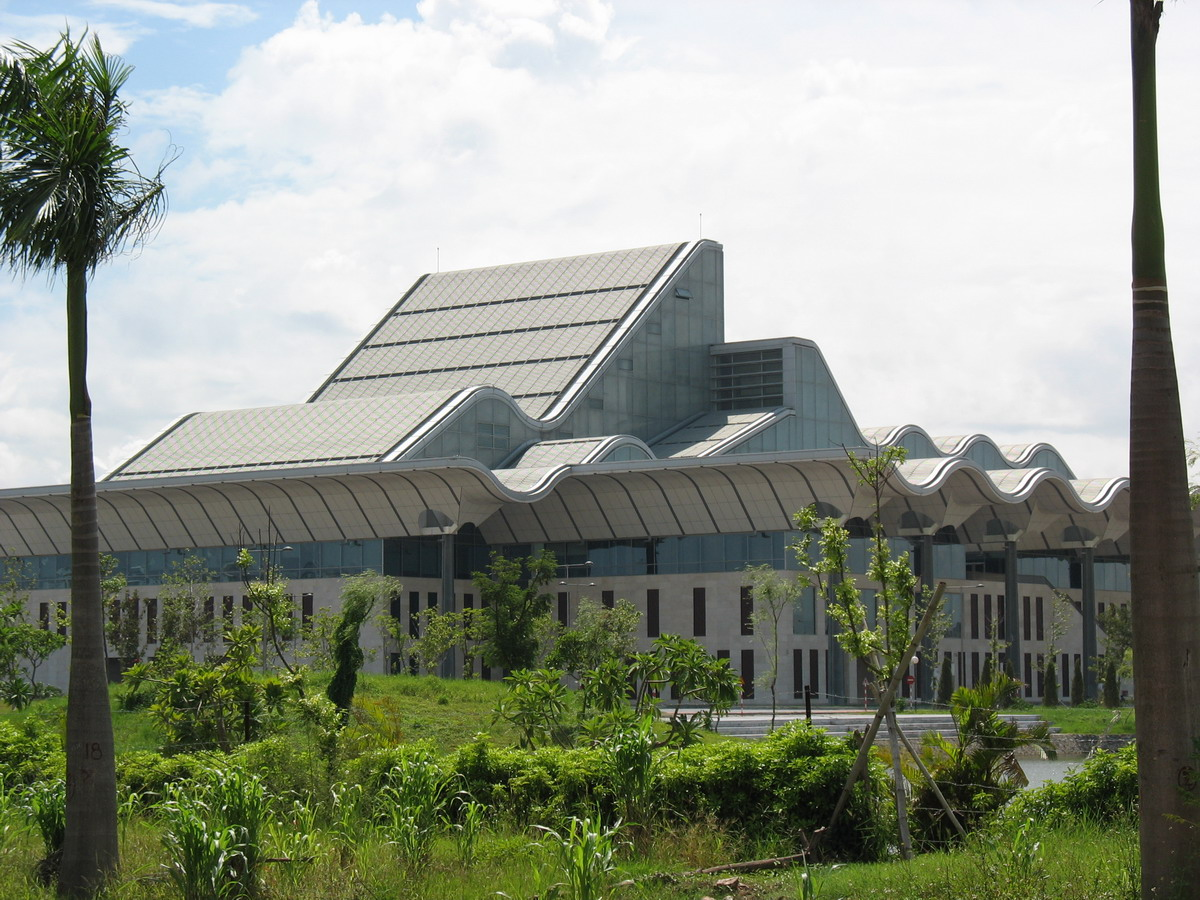
- Outside of the NCC
- Interactive map of National Convention Center
- Public transit: Bus Hanoi

Construction
- Built: 15 November 2004
- Cost: ₫4.3 trillion ₫12.6 trillion ($557.7 million) in 2018

Website
- http://ncc.gov.vn/

The National Convention Center (NCC; Vietnamese: Trung tâm Hội nghị Quốc gia) is a major convention center located on Thăng Long Boulevard in Nam Từ Liêm district of Hanoi, Vietnam. The convention center was designed by Meinhard von Gerkan and Nikolaus Goetze of Gerkan, Marg and Partners.

== Overview ==
=== History ===
Meinhard von Gerkan, who previously designed the Vietnamese National Assembly building, was assigned to design the National Convention Center. Four designs were presented for consideration in April 2004. In the end, a design called "Surfing the East Sea" was unanimously chosen as the official design of the project by a panel of 31 Vietnamese architects.

The project received government approval on 25 October 2004, and construction started on 15 November the same year. On 15 October 2006, the Vietnam National Convention Center was inaugurated.

=== Architecture ===
The design of the center takes inspirations from Hạ Long Bay, a World Heritage Site in Quảng Ninh Province, Vietnam. The building's wave-shaped roof is made from steel, heightened to 53.25 m (174.7 ft) over the main meeting hall. The main structure has a dimension of 215.25 m (706.2 ft) in length and 113.5 m (372 ft) in width.

=== Facilities ===
National Convention Center is the largest convention center in Vietnam by area, covering an area of 64 ha (160 acres). This complex includes a public square, a helipad, an on-ground and underground parking lot of 1,100 parking spaces, residential area and landscaping features. The core convention center itself has a gross floor space of 65,000 m^{2} (700,000 sq ft). It is equipped with solar power panels as a back-up energy source.

- 15,000 m^{2} (160,000 sq ft) exhibition space
- Banquet Hall, accommodating up to 1,800 people, 2,000 m^{2} (22,000 sq ft)
- Main Meeting Hall, 3,747 seats with a divider for a smaller configuration, 4,256 m^{2} (45,810 sq ft)
- 1 executive ballroom
- 2 executive meeting halls
- 3 press and media rooms
- 24 meeting rooms/ 72 breakouts

== Hostings ==
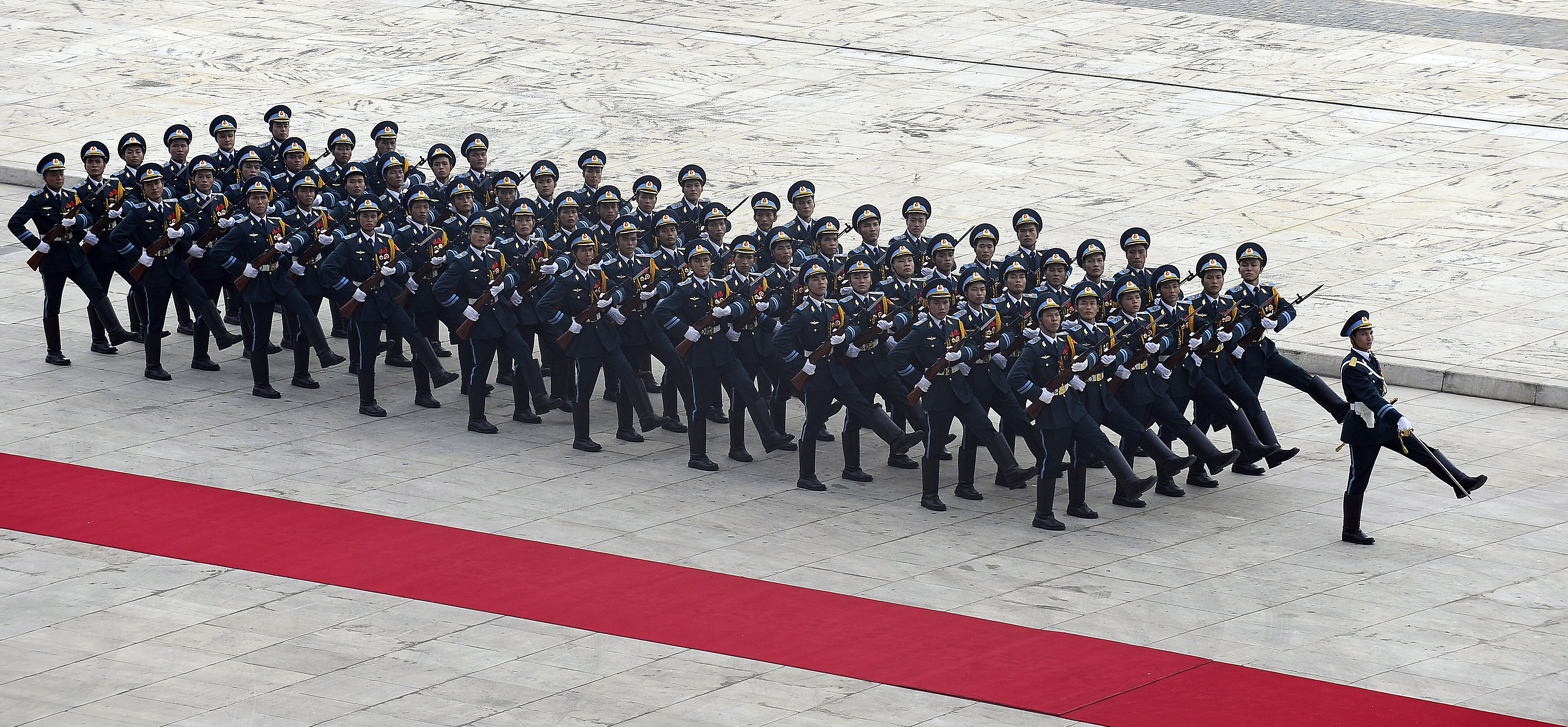
The Military Honour Guard Battalion of the Vietnam People's Army conducting a troop review at the convention center during the opening ceremony of the 16th ASEAN Summit in 2010.

NCC has hosted many high-profile political events. Some of the significant events include:

- 2006 APEC Economic Leaders' Meeting
- 16th ASEAN Summit (2010)
- 11th National Congress of the Communist Party of Vietnam (2011)
- 12th National Congress of the Communist Party of Vietnam (2016)
- 13th National Congress of the Communist Party of Vietnam (2021)
- 14th National Congress of the Communist Party of Vietnam (2026)

Many entertainment and exhibition events were also held at NCC. Multiple international artists.

It also hosted the 2019 League of Legends Mid-Season Invitational Group stage and the esports events of the 2021 Southeast Asian Games.
