= Ho Chi Minh Communist Youth Union =

Social-political organisation in Vietnam

Ho Chi Minh Communist Youth Union Đoàn Thanh niên Cộng sản Hồ Chí Minh
- First Secretary: Bùi Quang Huy
- Founded: 26 March 1931
- Headquarters: Hanoi, Vietnam
- Membership: ▲4,700,000+
- Ideology: Ho Chi Minh Thought; Communism; Marxism-Leninism; Socialist patriotism Vietnamese nationalism
- Mother party: Communist Party of Vietnam
- International affiliation: World Federation of Democratic Youth
- Newspaper: Tiền Phong; Tuổi Trẻ
- Website: doanthanhnien.vn

The Ho Chi Minh Communist Youth Union (Vietnamese: Đoàn Thanh niên Cộng sản Hồ Chí Minh, Đoàn TNCS), simply recognized as the Union (Vietnamese: Đoàn), is the largest socio-political organisation of Vietnamese youth. The union is under the leadership of the Communist Party of Vietnam. The organization was founded on 26 March 1931, and was led and trained by Ho Chi Minh.

The Union is considered by the Communist Party of Vietnam to be the training ground for future cadres, and the "extended arm" of the state.

== Legal basis ==
The Communist Youth Union is a member organization of the national common front called the Vietnamese Fatherland Front (the successor of the Viet Minh). The Union is cemented in Article 9 of the Constitution of Vietnam as a social-political organization established "on a voluntary basis to represent and protect the lawful and legitimate rights and interests of its members; and, together with other member organizations of the Vietnam Fatherland Front, coordinate and unify action within the Front."

The Union's charter, approved by its 12th National Congress on 15 December 2022, states:

"The Ho Chi Minh Communist Youth Union is a socio-political organization of Vietnamese youth, founded, led and trained by the Communist Party of Vietnam and President Ho Chi Minh. The Union includes progressive youths, striving for the Party's goals and ideals of national independence associated with socialism, a rich people, a strong country, democracy, equality and civility."

"Built, trained and matured through periods of revolutionary struggle, the Union has gathered a large number of yoúnters to promote revolutionary heroism, making outstanding contributions to the cause of national liberation, national unification, constructing and defending the Fatherland. Entering into a new period, the Union continues to promote the nation's precious traditions and its good nature, building a generation of Vietnamese youth who are patriotic, self-reliant; steadfast in the ideals of national independence and socialism; having revolutionary ethics, observant of rule-of-law, cultural life, and for the community; having the capacity and courage to integrate internationally; having health, knowledge, skills and industrial working style in collective labor, becoming good citizens of the nation; be proactive, creative in mastering advanced science and technology, and rise to the occasion. The Ho Chi Minh Communist Youth Union faithfully and excellently continues the glorious revolutionary cause of the Party and President Ho Chi Minh; regularly supplements a young force for the Party; organizes and mobilizes members and younths nationwide to take the lead in the cause of industrialization, modernization of the country, international integration and protection of the socialist Vietnamese Homeland."

"The Ho Chi Minh Communist Youth Union is a reliable reserve force of the Communist Party of Vietnam; is a revolutionary shock force; is a socialist school for young people; represents and protects the legitimate and legal rights and interests of young people; is in charge of the Ho Chi Minh Young Pioneers; is the core political force in the youth movement and in Vietnamese youth organizations."

"The Ho Chi Minh Communist Youth Union is a member of the political system, operating within the framework of the Constitution and Laws of the Socialist Republic of Vietnam. The Union coordinates with State agencies, the Vietnam Fatherland Front, mass, economic and social organizations, labor collectives and families to care for education, training and protection of children and adolescents; organizes members and young people to actively participate in state and social management."

"The Ho Chi Minh Communist Youth Union unites and develops friendly relations and equal cooperation with progressive youth organizations, youth and people of countries in the international community to strive for peace, national independence, democracy and social progress, for the future and happiness of youth."

— Preamble

== Charter ==
The Charter is the basic legal document of the Union, defining principles of organization, operation, and structure; regulating the responsibilities, obligations, and powers of members at all levels.

The purpose this Charter is to unify the ideological and organizational action of the entire Youth Union. The current Charter of the 12th Ho Chi Minh Communist Youth Union has 13 chapters and 42 articles:

- Chapter I: Youth Union members
- Chapter II: Principles, organizational structure and activities
- Chapter III: Central-level leadership bodies
- Chapter IV: Provincial and district-level leadership bodies
- Chapter V: Grassroots Youth Union organizations
- Chapter VI: Block Youth Unions, Industry Youth Unions, and Youth Unions abroad
- Chapter VII: Youth Union organizations in the Vietnam People's Army and the Vietnam People's Public Security
- Chapter VIII: Inspection, supervision and Inspection Committees at all levels
- Chapter IX: Rewards and discipline
- Chapter X: The Union and youth associations
- Chapter XI: The Union leading the Ho Chi Minh Young Pioneers
- Chapter XII: Finance
- Chapter XIII: Compliance with the Union Charter

== Names ==
During the Union's existence, it has seen its name changed six times to suit the tasks and requirements of youth movements in each revolutionary period:
26 March 1931 – 1936 : Indochina Communist Youth Union (ICYU)
(Đoàn Thanh niên Cộng sản Đông Dương)
1936 – November 1939: Indochina Democratic Youth Union (IDYU)
(Đoàn Thanh niên Dân chủ Đông Dương)
November 1939 – May 1941: Indochina Anti-Imperialist Youth Union (IAYU)
(Đoàn Thanh niên Phản đế Đông Dương)
May 1941 – 25 October 1956: Vietnam National Salvation Youth Union (VNSYU)
(Đoàn Thanh niên Cứu quốc Việt Nam)
25 October 1956 – February 1970: Vietnam Labour Youth Union （VLYU）
(Đoàn Thanh niên Lao động Việt Nam)
February 1970 – November 1976: Ho Chi Minh Labour Youth Union (HCMLYU)
(Đoàn Thanh niên Lao động Hồ Chí Minh)
December 1976 – now: Ho Chi Minh Communist Youth Union (HCMCYU)
(Đoàn Thanh niên Cộng sản Hồ Chí Minh)

== Anthem ==
The Youth Union's anthem is Thanh niên làm theo lời Bác ("The Youth follows Uncle Ho's sayings"):
