= Lê Quốc Minh =

Vietnamese reporter

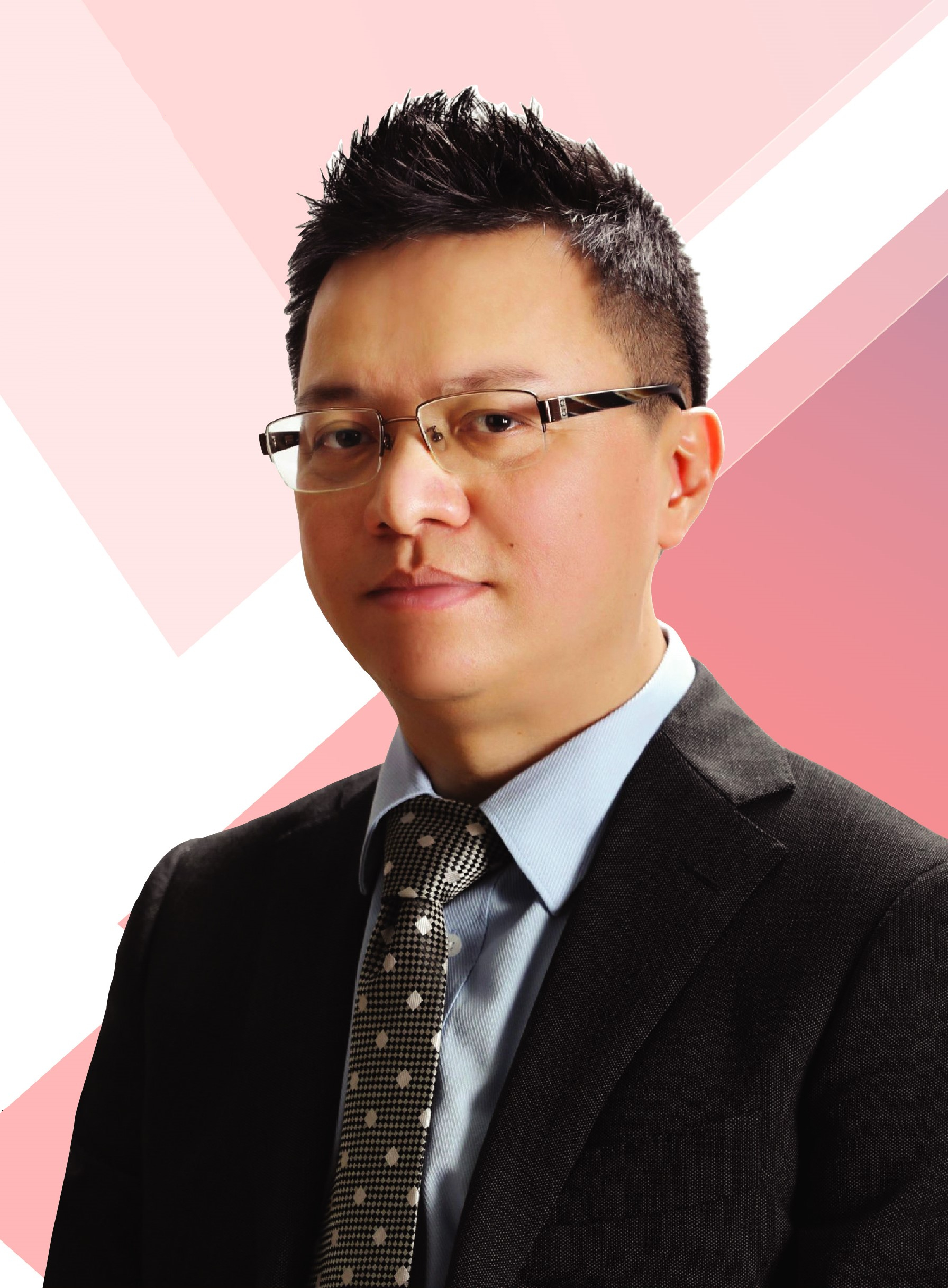
- Lê Quốc Minh in 2021

Editor-in-Chief of Nhân Dân
- Incumbent
- Assumed office April 29, 2021
- Preceded by: Thuận Hữu

Deputy General Director of Vietnam News Agency
- In office November 17, 2017 – April 29, 2021

Deputy Head of the Central Propaganda Department of the Communist Party of Vietnam
- Incumbent
- Assumed office July 21, 2021

Personal details
- Born: December 1, 1969 (age 56) Hanoi, Vietnam
- Party: Communist Party of Vietnam
- Education: VNU University of Languages and International Studies; VNU University of Social Sciences and Humanities
- Occupation: Journalist, politician

Lê Quốc Minh (born December 1, 1969) is a Vietnamese reporter, journalist, and politician. He is currently a member of 13th Central Committee of the Communist Party of Vietnam, editor-in-chief of Nhân Dân. He was former deputy general director of Vietnam News Agency and former editor-in-chief of VietnamPlus. Lê Quốc Minh is a member of the Communist Party of Vietnam, a journalist with a bachelor's degree in foreign languages and journalism.

== Early life ==
Lê Quốc Minh was born on December 1, 1969, in Hanoi. He majored in English at the Hanoi University of Foreign Language Education (the predecessor of the University of Foreign Languages, Vietnam National University, Hanoi). He graduated from the university in 1990. In the following years, he began his career as an editor of Vietnam News Agency while continuing to study Journalism at the University of Social Sciences and Humanities, Vietnam National University, and graduating in 1995. He also attended courses at the Ho Chi Minh National Academy of Politics, receiving an Advanced Degree in Political Theory. Lê Quốc Minh was admitted to the Communist Party of Vietnam on May 29, 2002, and became an official member on May 29, 2003.

== Career ==
Lê Quốc Minh started his journalism career in the 1990s as an editor of the World News Department of the Vietnam News Agency. World News Department, in conjunction with a network of 30 foreign bureaus worldwide, continuously updates daily news on international and regional issues as well as publishing numerous periodicals and some television programs. In 1996, after graduating from the University of Social Sciences and Humanities in Journalism, he went to Japan to work at NHK as an Expert in Humanities and Vietnamese Language Specialist of NHK World. In 2000, he returned to Vietnam, worked as editor for World News Department, and tasked with developing a website for the agency.

Lê Quốc Minh is the founder of the Vietnamjournalism forum in 2004 and has maintained the awarding of annual scholarships to journalism students ever since. He is a regular lecturer for journalism training programs of the Vietnam Journalists Association and the Press Department under the Ministry of Information and Communications, and a regional expert of the World Press Association (WAN-IFRA). Lê Quốc Minh is also a speaker at many international press conferences and seminars.

In 2008, he was appointed Editor-in-Chief of VietnamPlus, an online newspaper of Vietnam News Agency with five languages including Vietnamese, English, French, Spanish and Chinese. He is the first Editor-in-Chief of this electronic newspaper. Among the many creative journalism projects initiated by Lê Quốc Minh, there are a rap newsletter called RapNewsPlus to attract attention from young people starting in November 2013; an infographic project started in 2014. He also cooperated with the State Committee on Overseas Vietnamese to launch and develop the website vietkieu.info and coordinated with the Authority of Foreign Information Service, Ministry of Information and Communications to launch the Vietnam-France website. RapNewsPlus won first prize in the Digital First category of the World Young Reader Prizes, the annual awards from the World Association of Newspapers and News Publishers (WAN-IFRA) in 2014. With many achievements, VietnamPlus under his leadership was awarded the second-class Labor Order.

On November 17, 2017, Prime Minister Nguyen Xuan Phuc appointed Lê Quốc Minh as Deputy General Director of Vietnam News Agency.

He is also the initiator of the Say No to Fake News project to equip students with detecting fake news, starting from 2019, deployed in many localities throughout the country such as Hanoi, Ho Chi Minh City, Da Nang, Hai Phong, Dong Thap, Can Tho. By the end of 2020, VNA's project is called "Fighting against fake news – Creative ideas and effective solutions", with three components: Anti-Fake News song in 15 languages; Factcheckvn account on TikTok aimed at young people; and The Say No to Fake News Project won the Best Project for News Literacy category within the WAN-IFRA Asia Digital Media Awards 2020. Factcheckvn was also honoured as the community media channel of the year at TikTok Awards Vietnam 2020.

In two days August 13–14, in Hanoi, the Party Committee of the Vietnam News Agency held the 26th Congress (term of 2020 – 2025), electing Lê Quốc Minh as secretary of the Party Committee of the Vietnam News Agency. On January 30, 2021, at the 13th National Congress of the Communist Party of Vietnam, he was elected as an official member of the 13th Central Committee of the Communist Party of Vietnam.

On April 29, 2021, the Politburo issued a decision to appoint Lê Quốc Minh as editor-in-chief of Nhân Dân. He officially took the position during the Party Central Committee's personnel deployment conference on May 20, 2021.

On August 6, 2021, the Central Propaganda Department of the Communist Party of Vietnam announced the Decision No. 180-QDNS/TW, issued on July 21, 2021 of the Politburo, appointing Lê Quốc Minh deputy head of Central Propaganda Department of the Communist Party of Vietnam. He was also appointed to hold the position of party secretary of the Vietnam Journalists Association.
