= Vũ Đại Thắng =

Vietnamese politician (born 1975)

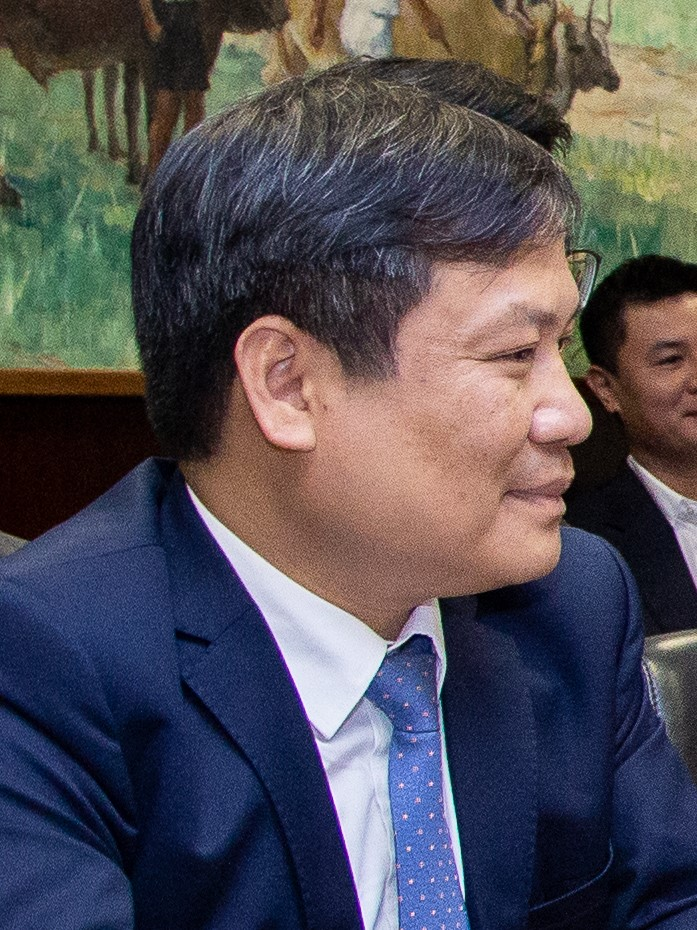
- Thắng in 2018

Chairman of the People's Committee of Hanoi
- Incumbent
- Assumed office 28 November 2025
- Preceded by: Nguyễn Đức Trung

Personal details
- Born: 4 October 1975 (age 50)
- Party: Communist Party of Vietnam (since 2005)

Vũ Đại Thắng (born 4 October 1975) is a Vietnamese politician serving as chairman of the People's Committee of Hanoi since 2025. From 2021 to 2026, he was a member of the National Assembly.
