= Nguyễn Anh Tuấn (politician) =

Vietnamese politician (born 1979)

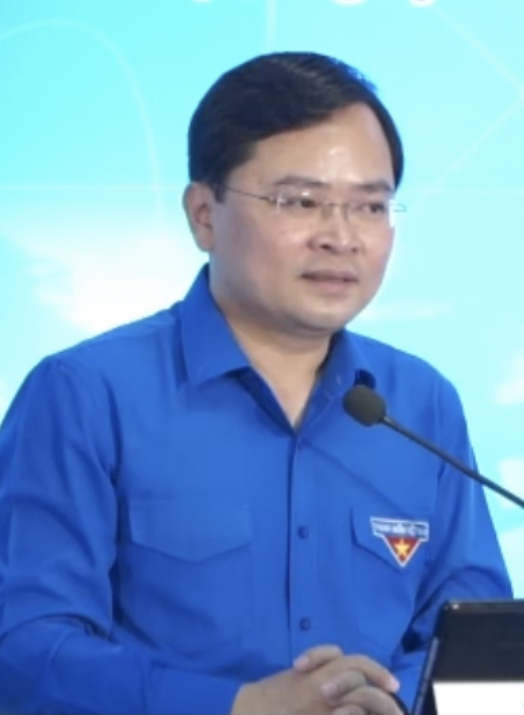
- Tuấn in 2022

President of the Vietnam General Confederation of Labour
- Incumbent
- Assumed office 5 March 2026
- Preceded by: Nguyễn Đình Khang

Personal details
- Born: 26 November 1979 (age 46)
- Party: Communist Party of Vietnam (since 2001)

Nguyễn Anh Tuấn (born 26 November 1979) is a Vietnamese politician serving as president of the Vietnam General Confederation of Labour since 2026. He has been a member of the National Assembly since 2021.
