= Central Committee of the Communist Party of Vietnam =

Highest decision-making body of the Communist Party of Vietnam

Communist Party of Vietnam Central Committee Ban Chấp hành Trung ương Đảng Cộng sản Việt Nam
- 14th Central Committee (2026–2031)

Overview
- Type: Political-executive organ
- Responsible to: National Congress
- Elected by: National Congress
- Length of term: Five years
- Term limits: None
- Age limit: 60 years or younger, but exemptions can be given.

History
- Established: by 1st National Congress on 30 March 1935; 91 years ago
- First convocation: 30 March 1935
- Latest convocation: 22 January 2026

Leadership
- Political Executive Leader: General Secretary
- Political organ: Politburo
- Executive organ: Secretariat
- Inspection organ: Inspection Commission
- Military organ: Military Commission

Members
- Total: 180 members

Alternates
- Total: 20 alternates

Elections
- Last election: The 14th National Congress in 22 January 2026
- Next election: The 15th National Congress in 2031

Meeting place
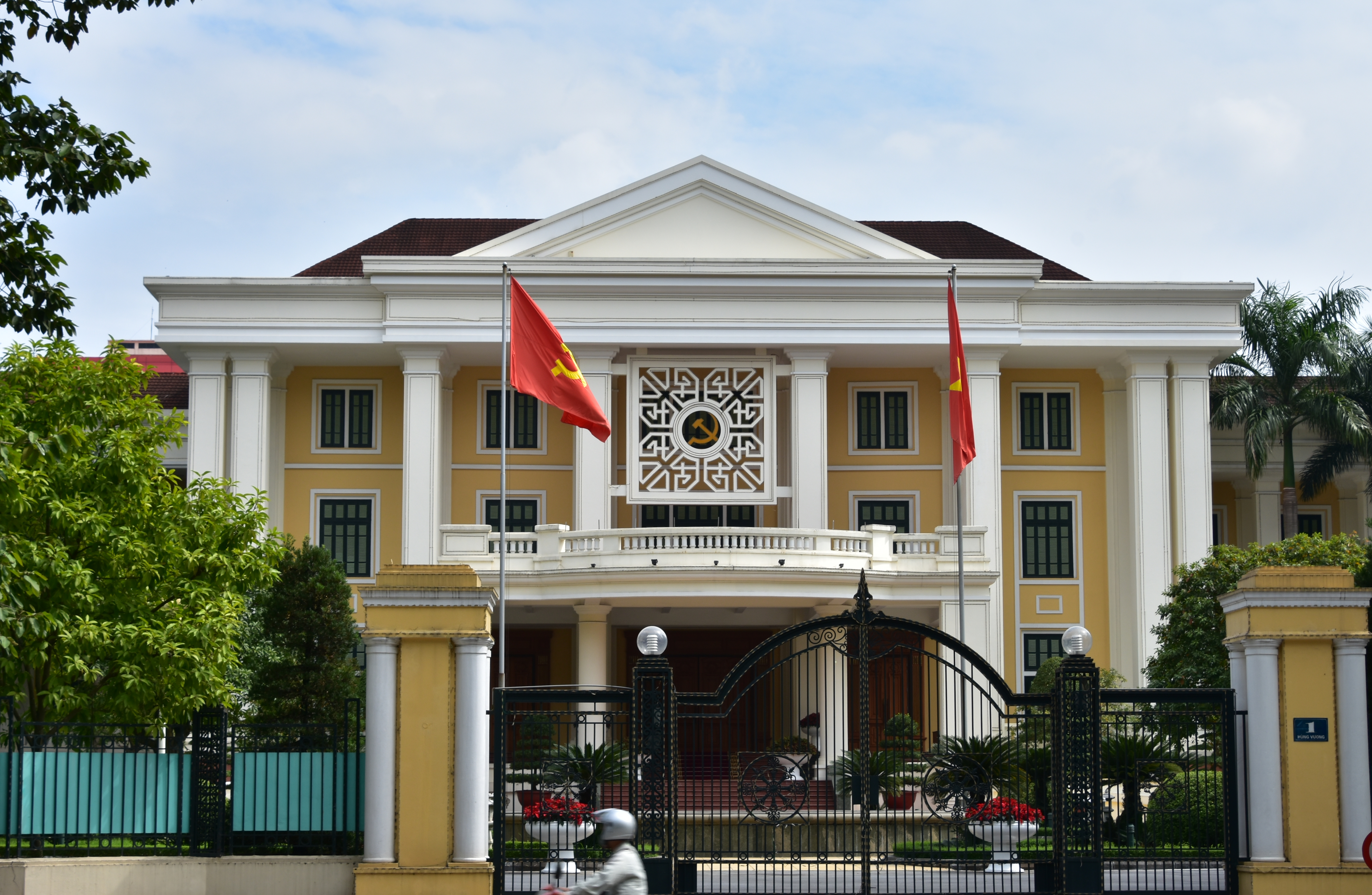
- Headquarters of the Party Central Committee; 1A, Hùng Vương, Phường Điện Biên, Quận Ba Đình, Hà Nội

Charter
- "Charter of the Communist Party of Vietnam"

Rules
- "Working Regulations of the Central Committee, Politburo and the Secretariat"

Website
- dangcongsan.vn

The Central Committee of the Communist Party of Vietnam (Vietnamese: Ban Chấp hành Trung ương Đảng Cộng sản Việt Nam), commonly the Party Central Committee (PCC; Vietnamese: Ban Chấp hành Trung ương Đảng - BCHTW Đảng or BCHTƯ Đảng), is the highest organ between two national congresses and the organ of authority of the Communist Party of Vietnam, the sole ruling party in the Socialist Republic of Vietnam.

== History ==
The Central Committee was established on 3 February 1930 when the Communist Party of Indochina and the Communist Party of Annam merged. In between Central Committee plenary sessions the main decision-making bodies of the party are the Politburo and the Secretariat. The Central Committee has been led since its establishment in 1930 by the General Secretary of the Central Committee.

=== Terms ===
Term	Members					Alternates					Plenums	Period		Duration	Ref.
Term	Male		Female		Re.	Male		Female		Re.	Plenums	Start	End	Duration	Ref.
Term	PM.	%.	PM.	%.	Re.	PA.	%.	PA.	%.	Re.	Plenums	Start	End	Duration	Ref.
Provisional	?	?	?	?	?	?	?	?	?	?	?	3 February 1930	30 March 1935	5 years, 55 days	
1st	25	96,15%	1	3,85%	10	5	100%	0	0%	3	8	30 March 1935	19 February 1951	15 years, 326 days	
2nd	25	96,15%	1	3,85%	25	15	93,75%	1	6,25%	6	18	19 February 1951	12 September 1960	9 years, 206 days	
3rd	49	96,08%	2	3,92%	37	32	96,97%	1	3,03%	9	25	12 September 1960	20 December 1976	16 years, 99 days	
4th	97	95,10%	5	4,90%	64	30	93,75%	2	6,25%	21	12	20 December 1976	31 March 1982	5 years, 101 days	
5th	115	95,04%	6	4,96%	67	33	91,67%	3	8,33%	24	12	31 March 1982	18 December 1986	4 years, 262 days	
6th	125	93,98%	8	6,02%	72	43	87,76%	6	12,24%	31	12	18 December 1986	27 June 1991	4 years, 191 days	
7th	155	92,81%	12	7,19%	95	—	—	—	—	—	13	27 June 1991	1 July 1996	5 years, 4 days	
8th	153	89,82%	17	10,18%	73	—	—	—	—	—	12	1 July 1996	22 April 2001	4 years, 295 days	
9th	137	92,35%	13	7,65%	81	—	—	—	—	—	15	22 April 2001	25 April 2006	5 years, 3 days	
10th	143	91,10%	13	8,90%	84	18	85,71%	3	14,29%	19	15	25 April 2006	19 January 2011	4 years, 269 days	
11th	160	91,43%	15	8,57%	82	22	88,00%	3	12,00%	16	14	19 January 2011	28 January 2016	5 years, 9 days	
12th	163	90,56%	17	9,44%	103	17	85,00%	3	15,00%	16	15	28 January 2016	1 February 2021	5 years, 4 days	
13th	162	90,00%	18	10,00%	18	19	95,00%	1	5,00%	1	15	1 February 2021	22 January 2026	4 years, 355 days	
14th	159	88,34%	21	11,67%	—	20	100,00%	0	0,00%	—	1	22 January 2026	Incumbent	67 days	

== See also ==
- Central Committee subunits
  - Politburo of the Communist Party of Vietnam
  - Secretariat of the Communist Party of Vietnam
  - General Secretary of the Communist Party of Vietnam
- List of central officeholders in the Communist Party of Vietnam

== Bibliography ==
- Giang, Nguyen Khac; Thai, Nguyen Quang (2022). "From Periphery to Centre: The Self-evolution of the Vietnamese Communist Party's Central Committee". Contemporary Southeast Asia: A Journal of International and Strategic Affairs. 44 (1): 56–86. ISSN 1793-284X.
