= 16th National Assembly of Vietnam =

Vietnamese parliamentary cycle in 2026

←	15th National Assembly
- The National Assembly House in 2026, days after the general election

Overview
- Jurisdiction: Vietnam
- Meeting place: National Assembly House, Hanoi
- Term: 6 April 2026 –
- Election: 2026 Vietnamese legislative election
- Government: Government of Lê Minh Hưng
- Website: quochoi.vn (in Vietnamese)

National Assembly
- Members: 500 - VFF (100%); CPV (482 - 96.4%); Independents (18 - 3.6%)
- Chairman: Trần Thanh Mẫn
- Permanent Vice Chairman: Đỗ Văn Chiến
- Vice Chairman: Nguyễn Khắc Định; Nguyễn Thị Thanh; Nguyễn Doãn Anh; Nguyễn Hồng Diên; Nguyễn Thị Hồng
- Secretary-General: Lê Quang Mạnh

Sessions
- 1st: 6 – 24 April 2026
- 1st Ext.: 3 – 24 August 2026
- 2nd: 17 October – 21 November 2026

The 16th National Assembly of Vietnam (Vietnamese: Quốc hội Việt Nam khóa XVI, lit. 'National Assembly of Vietnam XVI'; less formally the 16th National Assembly - Vietnamese: Quốc hội khóa XVI, lit. 'National Assembly XVI') is the parliamentary cycle that commenced in April 2026 following the legislative elections on 15 March 2026. The National Assembly had 500 members, formally confirmed at the press conference of the National Election Council on 21 March 2026.

The 16th National Assembly first convened on 6 April 2026 to re-elect Trần Thanh Mẫn as its Chairman, Tô Lâm as President of Vietnam and Lê Minh Hưng as Prime Minister of Vietnam, principally constituting the Vietnamese administration until 2031.

== Election ==
Legislative elections were held on 15 March 2026 to elect members of the National Assembly and deputies of provincial, district and communical councils. About 76,423,940 people went to vote in 34 provinces and municipalities throughout the country. There were 868 candidates contested with a maximum of 500 candidates elected.

At the end 500 candidates were announced elected. The Communist party won 482 seats with the rest going to independent candidates.

== Sessions ==
=== First session (6–24 April 2026) ===
The first session of the 16th National Assembly took place in two phases: the first from 6 to 12 April 2026, and the second from 20 to 24 April 2026. The session will consider and approve the summary report of the election of deputies to the 16th National Assembly and deputies to People's Councils at all levels for the 2026–2031 term. Simultaneously, the National Assembly will elect a new Chairman, Deputy Speakers, members of the Standing Committee of the National Assembly, the Chairman of the National Ethnic Council, the Chairman of the National Assembly Committees, the Secretary-General of the National Assembly, the President, the Vice President, the Prime Minister, the Chief Justice of the Supreme People's Court, and the State Auditor General. The National Assembly will also decide on the organizational structure and number of members of the Government; approve the appointment of Deputy Prime Ministers, Ministers, and other members of the Government; and approve the list of Vice Chairman and members of the National Defence and Security Council.

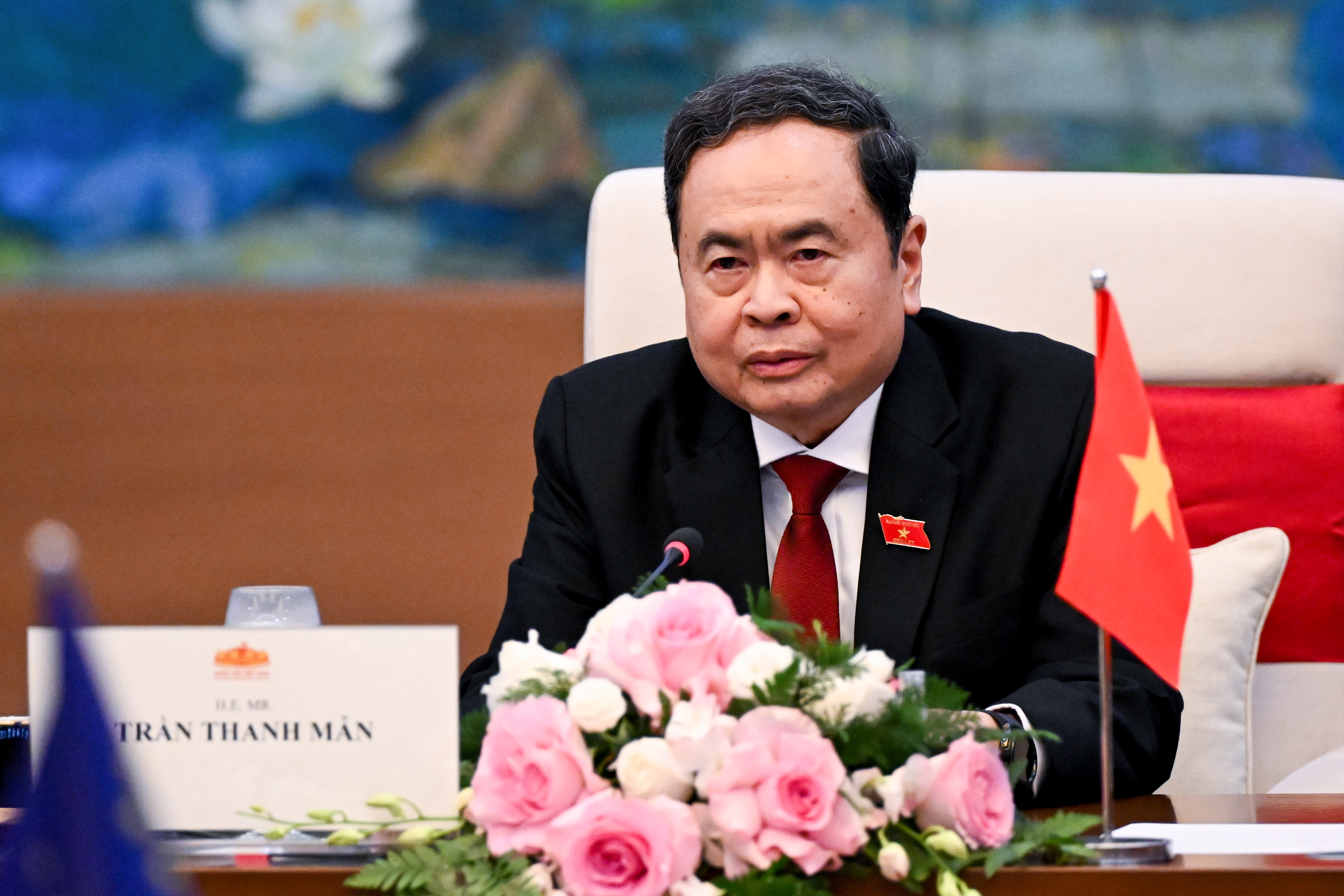
Trần Thanh Mẫn continued to serve as the Chairman of the National Assembly of Vietnam.

==== Election for senior members of the National Assembly ====
Election of Chairman of National Assembly				Election of Vice Chairman of National Assembly			
Candidate	In favour	Against	Abstain	Candidate	In favour	Against	Abstain
Trần Thanh Mẫn	491	0	0	Đỗ Văn Chiến (Note: Vice Chairman of the National Assembly)	493	0	0
Trần Thanh Mẫn	491	0	0	Nguyễn Khắc Định	493	0	0
Trần Thanh Mẫn	491	0	0	Nguyễn Thị Thanh	493	0	0
Trần Thanh Mẫn	491	0	0	Nguyễn Doãn Anh	493	0	0
Trần Thanh Mẫn	491	0	0	Nguyễn Hồng Diên	493	0	0
Trần Thanh Mẫn	491	0	0	Nguyễn Thị Hồng	493	0	0
Election of Members of NA Standing Committee
Candidate	In favour	Against	Abstain	Candidate	In favour	Against	Abstain
Lê Tấn Tới	487	0	0	Nguyễn Hữu Đông	487	0	0
Lâm Văn Mẫn	487	0	0	Lê Thị Nga	487	0	0
Phan Chí Hiếu	487	0	0	Lê Quang Mạnh	487	0	0
Nguyễn Đắc Vinh	487	0	0	Nguyễn Thanh Hải	487	0	0
Phan Văn Mãi	487	0	0	Hoàng Duy Chinh	487	0	0
Vũ Hải Hà	487	0	0	Hoàng Duy Chinh	487	0	0
Election of Chairmen of NA councils, committees and Secretary-General
Election of Head of the Department of National Defence and Security				Election of Head of the Council of Ethnic Groups			
Candidate	In favour	Against	Abstain	Candidate	In favour	Against	Abstain
Lê Tấn Tới	493	0	0	Lâm Văn Mẫn	493	0	0
Election of Head of Law and Justice Committee				Election of Head of Culture and Society Committee			
Candidate	In favour	Against	Abstain	Candidate	In favour	Against	Abstain
Phan Chí Hiếu	493	0	0	Nguyễn Đắc Vinh	493	0	0
Election of Head of Economic and Financial Committee				Election of Head of Committee for Science, Technology and Environment Affairs			
Candidate	In favour	Against	Abstain	Candidate	In favour	Against	Abstain
Phan Văn Mãi	493	0	0	Nguyễn Thanh Hải	493	0	0
Election of Head of Committee for Delegate Affairs				Election of Head of Citizen Petitions and Oversight Committee			
Candidate	In favour	Against	Abstain	Candidate	In favour	Against	Abstain
Nguyễn Hữu Đông	493	0	0	Lê Thị Nga	493	0	0
Election of Secretary General of Head of the National Assembly Office				Election of Head of State Audit Office			
Candidate	In favour	Against	Abstain	Candidate	In favour	Against	Abstain
Nguyễn Hữu Đông	493	0	0	Lê Thị Nga	493	0	0

==== Election of State leaders ====
Election of the President				Election of the Vice President			
Candidate	In favour	Against	Abstain	Candidate	In favour	Against	Abstain
Tô Lâm	495	0	0	Võ Thị Ánh Xuân	485	0	0
Election of the Chief Justice of the Supreme People's Court				Election of the Prosecutor General of the Supreme People's Procuracy			
Candidate	In favour	Against	Abstain	Candidate	In favour	Against	Abstain
Nguyễn Văn Quảng	496	0	0	Nguyễn Huy Tiến	474	0	0
Election of the Judge of the Supreme People's Court
Candidate		In favour		Against		Abstain	
Nguyễn Hải Trâm		488		0		0	
Nguyễn Văn Cường		488		0		0	
Lê Hưng Dũng		488		0		0	
Lê Thanh Phong		488		0		0	
Đỗ Mạnh Tăng		488		0		0	
Nguyễn Hải Thanh		488		0		0	
Nguyễn Hữu Tuyến		488		0		0	
Đỗ Thị Hải Yến		488		0		0	

==== Election of Government leaders ====
Election of the Prime Minister				Approval of Deputy Prime Ministers			
Candidate	In favour	Against	Abstain	Candidate	In favour	Against	Abstain
Lê Minh Hưng	495	0	0	Phạm Gia Túc	485	0	1
Lê Minh Hưng	495	0	0	Phan Văn Giang	485	0	1
Lê Minh Hưng	495	0	0	Phạm Thị Thanh Trà	485	0	1
Lê Minh Hưng	495	0	0	Hồ Quốc Dũng	485	0	1
Lê Minh Hưng	495	0	0	Nguyễn Văn Thắng	485	0	1
Lê Minh Hưng	495	0	0	Lê Tiến Châu	485	0	1

=== First extraordinary session (3–24 August 2026) ===
The first extraordinary session took place in two phases: the first from 3 to 13 August, and the second from 18 to 24 August. The session was considered and decided on 33 important issues. Regarding legislative work, the National Assembly was passed the 15 draft laws and 4 normative resolutions, including the Law on Petroleum (amended), the Law on the State Bank of Vietnam, the Law on Investment (amended Article 6 and Appendix IV), the Law on Customs, the Law on Urban Development, etc. The National Assembly was also provided input on numerous draft laws and making decisions on important issues.

On the afternoon of the closing ceremony of the 1st extraordinary session on 24th August 2026, the National Assembly has passed a resolution that will establish Quảng Ninh and Bắc Ninh province as a centrally-governed city from 1st September and 20th September 2026 respectively, after 478 out of 478 (Bắc Ninh) and 480 out of 480 (Quảng Ninh) National Assembly members voted.

=== Second session (17 October – 21 November 2026) ===
The second session took place in two phases: the first from 17 October to 14 November, and the second from 20 to 21 November. The session is currently considered and decided on 47 draft laws and resolutions, of which 43 will be adopted. In addition, legislators will consider and decide on socio-economic, financial, and budgetary matters.
