= Vạn Thịnh Phát fraud case =

Economic corruption scandal in Vietnam

Vạn Thịnh Phát case
- Part of Blazing Furnace
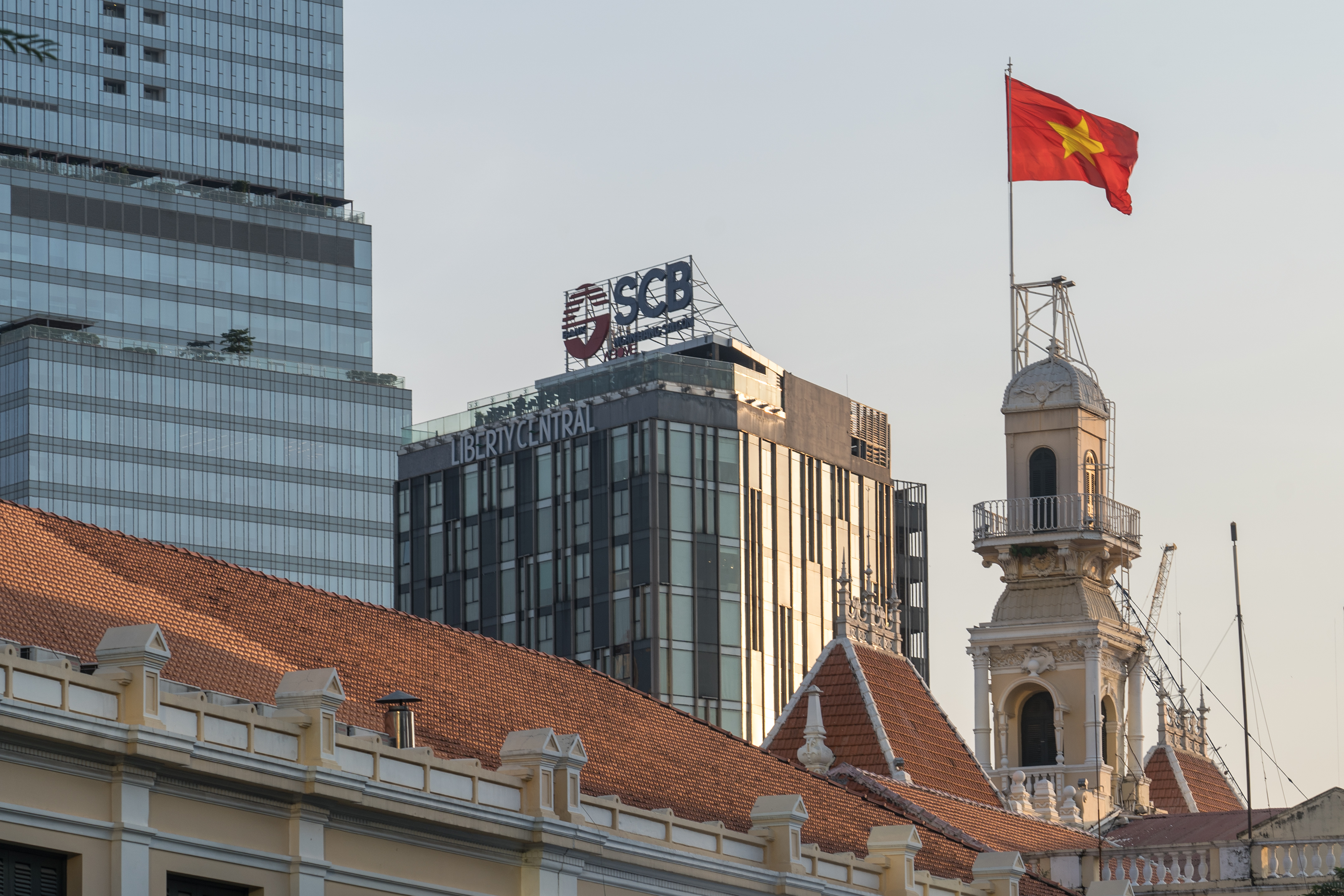
- SCB logo, as seen over the Ho Chi Minh City Hall
- Date: October 8, 2022 (Note: From the time of the arrest of Trương Mỹ Lan.) – present (3 years and 11 months)
- Also known as: Vạn Thịnh Phát Major Case
- Theme: Corruption
- Organised by: Trương Mỹ Lan
- Outcome: Sai Gon Joint Stock Commercial Bank placed under special control; State Bank of Vietnam provided a loan of US$24 billion to Sai Gon Joint Stock Commercial Bank
- Inquiries: 86 defendants (phase 1); 34 defendants (phase 2)
- Charges: List of charges: Phase 1: Bribery; Accepting bribes; Violating regulations on banking activities, other activities related to banking operations; Embezzlement of assets; Abuse of position and power while performing official duties; Lack of responsibility causing serious consequences; Abuse of trust to appropriate property; Phase 2: Money laundering; Fraud to appropriate property; Illegal transportation of currency across borders
- Trial: People's Court of Ho Chi Minh City
- Verdict: 1 death sentence; 4 life sentences; 81 sentences ranging from 3 to 20 years in prison
- Damage: ₫677 trillion (US$27 billion)

The Vạn Thịnh Phát case, officially referred to by the People's Court of Ho Chi Minh City, Vietnam as the Trương Mỹ Lan and Accomplices case, was a major economic corruption scandal involving the Vạn Thịnh Phát Group joint-stock company. Under the leadership of billionaire Trương Mỹ Lan for over a decade, Vạn Thịnh Phát orchestrated a large-scale fraud scheme targeting the Sai Gon Joint Stock Commercial Bank (SCB).

The Vạn Thịnh Phát scandal was exposed during the anti-corruption Blazing Furnace campaign initiated by General Secretary Nguyễn Phú Trọng. The total damage from the case was estimated at ₫677 trillion (approximately US$27 billion), with fraudulent disbursements reaching ₫1 quadrillion (approximately US$44 billion) through SCB loan documents. This made it one of the largest economic scandals in Vietnam's history, surpassing the 1 Malaysia Development Berhad scandal in Malaysia and making it the largest corruption case in Southeast Asia. Many senior officials, including high-ranking leaders, were implicated, and a total of 86 individuals were charged.

According to the People's Court of Ho Chi Minh City, the trial of the Vạn Thịnh Phát case was to be conducted in two phases: the first focused on investigation, prosecution, and asset recovery; the second phase addressed issues related to fraudulent corporate bonds.

The first-phase trial took place from March 5 to April 11, 2024, with the participation of 200 lawyers and 86 defendants, seven of whom were absent. Trương Mỹ Lan was sentenced to death; four accomplices received life sentences, while the remaining defendants were sentenced to prison terms ranging from three years of suspended sentence to 20 years. Trương Mỹ Lan's husband and niece were respectively sentenced to 9 and 17 years in prison.

== Background ==
Trương Mỹ Lan, born on October 13, 1956, is a Vietnamese businesswoman of Chinese descent. She was born in Saigon, Republic of Vietnam (now Ho Chi Minh City, Vietnam). Before becoming the owner of a major corporation in Vietnam, she sold cosmetics at Bến Thành Market, Ho Chi Minh City, with financial support from her mother. In 1992, she married Hong Kong businessman Eric Chu Nap-kee (Chu Lập Cơ). Together, they founded Vạn Thịnh Phát Group, initially focusing on trade, business, restaurants, and hotels in the aftermath of the Đổi Mới reforms.

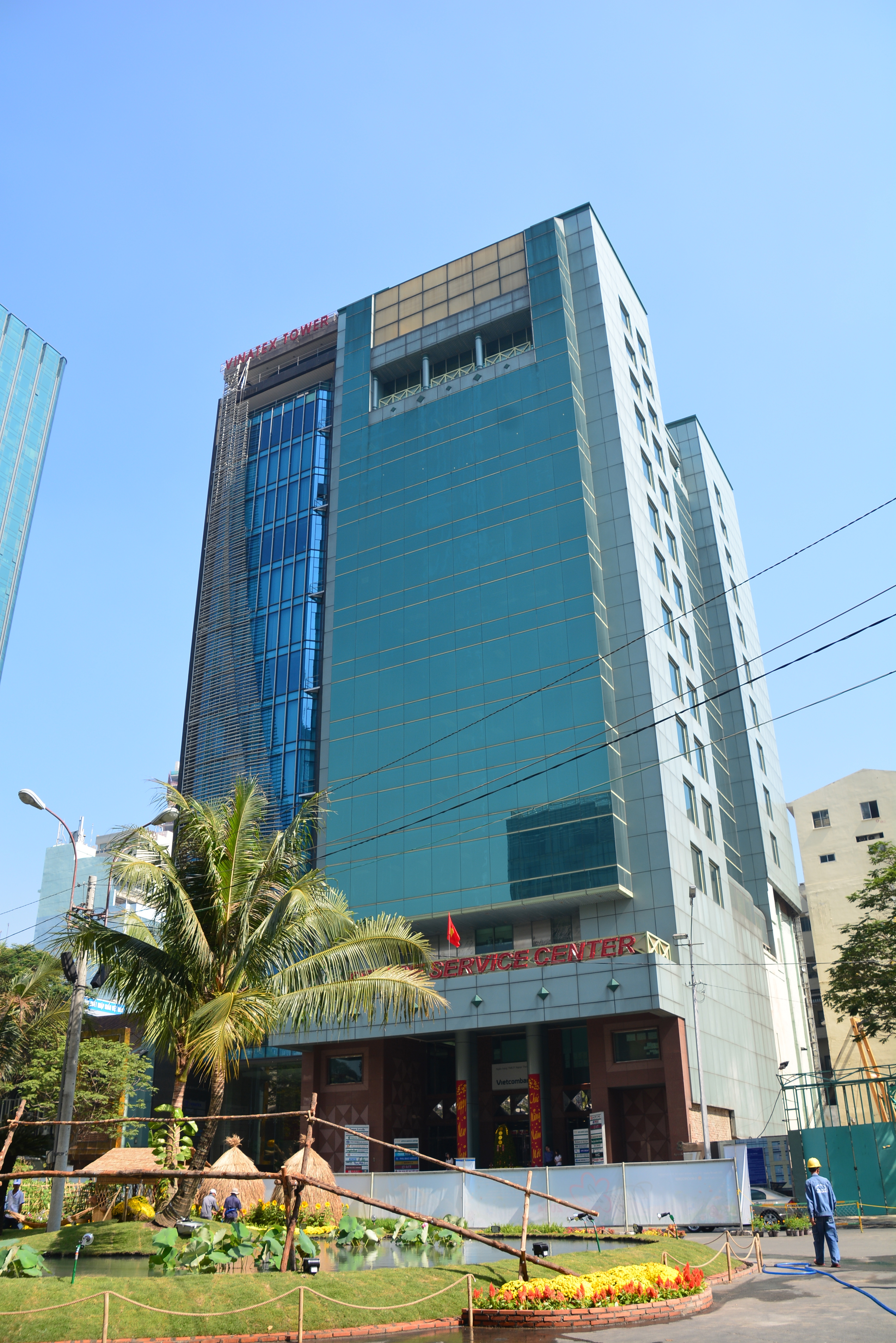
VTP Office Center, their first property on Nguyễn Huệ Blvd

In 2007, Vạn Thịnh Phát established two subsidiaries: Vạn Thịnh Phát Investment Group and An Đông Investment. After gaining control of Saigon Commercial Bank (SCB) through shareholdings, SCB became one of the largest commercial banks in Vietnam by asset size. Simultaneously, Vạn Thịnh Phát grew into one of Vietnam’s wealthiest real estate companies, developing a range of high-end projects, including luxury residential buildings, office towers, hotels, and shopping centers.

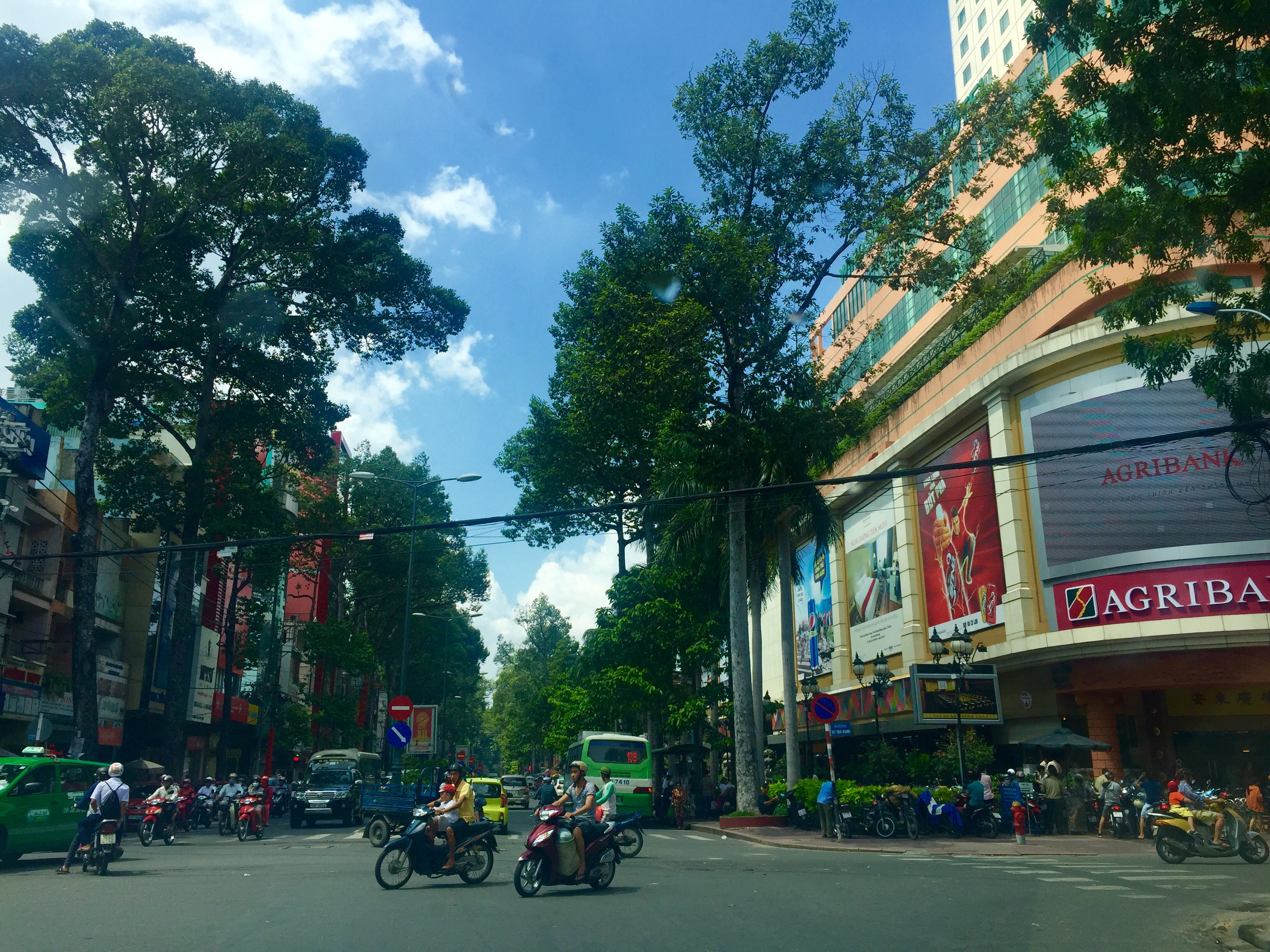
A corner of An Đông Plaza Mall in the Windsor Plaza Hotel

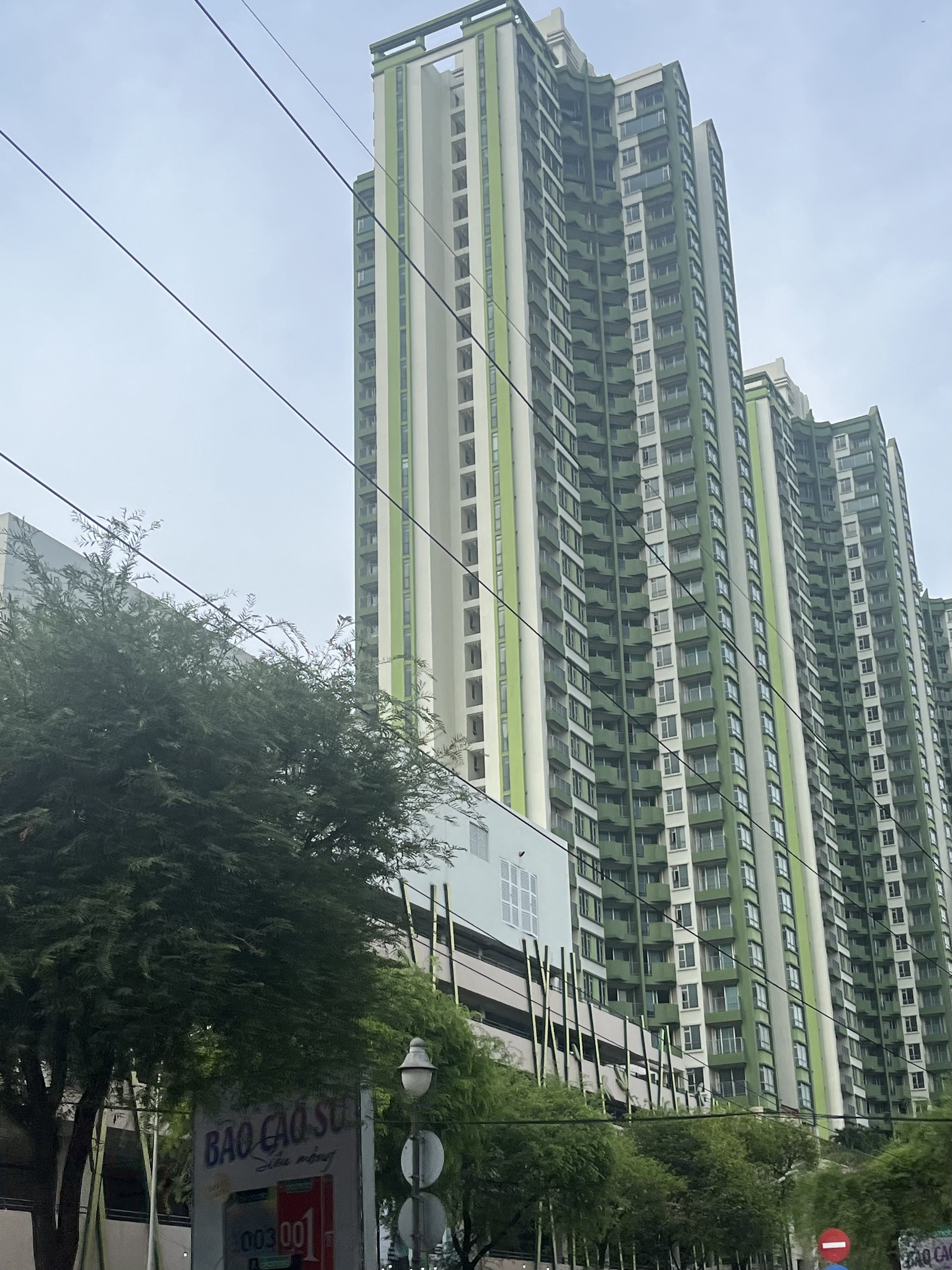
Thuận Kiều Plaza, now is The Garden Residence & Mall

Notable properties of An Đông Investment

Times Square Investment JSC, a subsidiary of Vạn Thịnh Phát, owns a prime property with frontages on Nguyễn Huệ Walking Street and the Union Square Saigon (formerly named as Vincom Center A), a complex of shopping and Mandarin Oriental hotel, which was the place of the former Eden Passage Mall that features four frontages. The Times Square Investment building (located at 22–36 Nguyễn Huệ, District 1) is chaired by Eric Chu. This building was used as collateral for loans at Saigon Commercial Bank (SCB), while the SCB headquarters is located at Bitexco Office Building, 19–25 Nguyễn Huệ. Despite controlling significant assets, little information is publicly available about Trương Mỹ Lan or her family.

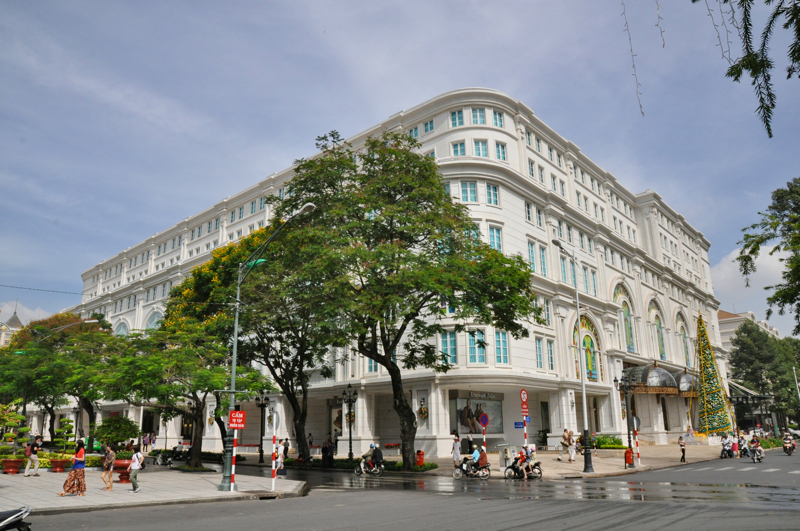
Union Square Saigon, the property was bought from Vincom

=== Burning Furnace campaign ===
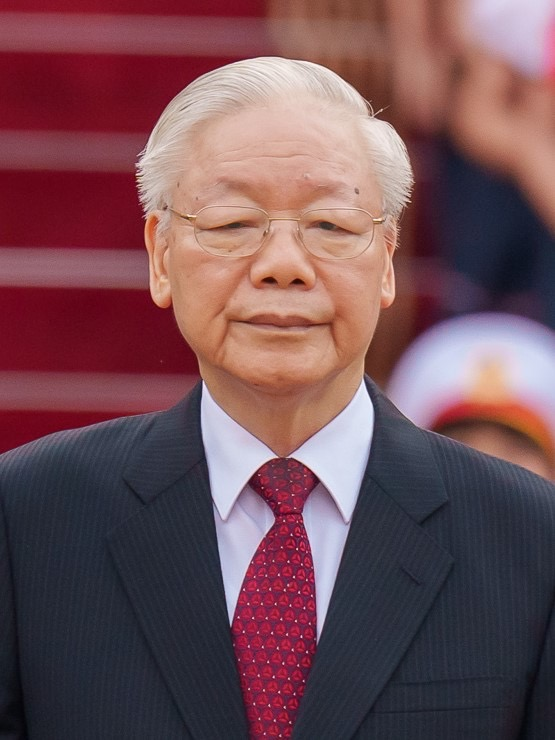
General Secretary Nguyễn Phú Trọng, who initiated the Burning Furnace Campaign.

Corruption in Vietnam expanded during the tenure of Prime Minister Nguyễn Tấn Dũng. In 2016, the Communist Party of Vietnam launched the anti-corruption campaign known as the Blazing Furnace, initiated by General Secretary Nguyễn Phú Trọng. The campaign intensified in 2022, leading to the resignation of several high-ranking government officials, including Presidents Nguyễn Xuân Phúc and Võ Văn Thưởng. Additionally, thousands of prosecutions were initiated as part of the crackdown. The campaign also had a significant impact on economic figures and business leaders.

In March 2022, Trịnh Văn Quyết, chairman of FLC Group and its subsidiary Bamboo Airways, was arrested for stock market manipulation. Nearly a month later, Đỗ Anh Dũng, chairman of Tân Hoàng Minh Group, was arrested for fraud and asset appropriation. Similarly, in April, Trần Quý Thanh, chairman of Tân Hiệp Phát Group, Vietnam's largest private beverage producer, was arrested for embezzlement. During March and April 2022, the chairmen of three major Vietnamese corporations were consecutively arrested for legal violations. (Note: See sources:) However, there have been allegations that the Blazing Furnace campaign is being used for political purposes and internal power struggles, a claim that the Vietnamese Ministry of Foreign Affairs has denied.

== Violations process ==
Times Square Building of Vạn Thịnh Phát Group in 2024.

In 1992, Trương Mỹ Lan and her husband, Chu Lập Cơ, founded Vạn Thịnh Phát LLC, initially operating in trade, business, restaurants, and hotels. By 2007, with a charter capital of 6,000 billion VND, Vạn Thịnh Phát expanded into the real estate sector. Over the years, Trương Mỹ Lan established numerous subsidiaries and affiliated companies, with capital amounting to thousands of billions of VND. These include An Đông Investment JSC (9,000 billion VND), Times Square Vietnam Investment JSC, Saigon Peninsula Group JSC (18,000 billion VND), VTP Group Holdings (6,000 billion VND), and another entity under VTP Group Holdings (12,800 billion VND).

By the end of 2019, Vạn Thịnh Phát Group increased its charter capital to 13,000 billion VND through the issuance of shares to domestic shareholders. Over its development, the group has built an extensive corporate ecosystem, comprising more than 1,000 enterprises.

The subsidiaries of Vạn Thịnh Phát can be categorized into four main groups:

1. Financial Institutions Group – Considered the most crucial, as it serves as the primary funding source for the entire Vạn Thịnh Phát ecosystem.
2. Domestic Business Group – Comprising companies primarily engaged in real estate, hospitality, and restaurants, with large charter capital to attract investment and maintain controlling shares in other subsidiaries.
3. "Ghost" Companies in Vietnam – These entities use legal mechanisms to invest capital, secure bank loans, and refinance debts.
4. Overseas Companies – Functioning as "foreign investors" in Vietnam, these companies are also used to manage Trương Mỹ Lan's family assets abroad.

Among these entities, Saigon Commercial Joint Stock Bank (SCB) is a key financial institution within the Vạn Thịnh Phát ecosystem. According to Vietnam’s 2010 Law on Credit Institutions, an individual cannot own more than 5% of a credit institution’s charter capital. To circumvent this regulation, in 2011, Trương Mỹ Lan used her relatives and close associates to amass 80–90% of the shares in three banks: Đệ Nhất Bank (Ficombank), Vietnam Tin Nghia Commercial Joint Stock Bank (TinNghiaBank), and Saigon Commercial Joint Stock Bank (SCB). At that time, she controlled:

- 81.43% of SCB shares under the names of 32 shareholders
- 98.74% of TinNghiaBank shares through 36 shareholders
- 80.46% of Ficombank shares through 24 shareholders

On January 1, 2012, these three banks merged under the SCB name, with Trương Mỹ Lan continuing to hold 85.61% of the shares through 73 proxy shareholders. By January 1, 2018, her indirect ownership had increased to 91.54%. Trương Mỹ Lan used SCB’s operations to raise capital for Vạn Thịnh Phát and its subsidiaries, creating fraudulent loan documents to embezzle funds for personal use. To facilitate this scheme, she bribed numerous Vietnamese government officials. Additionally, she colluded with appraisal firms, including Thiên Phú Appraisal Company, MHD Appraisal Company Limited, Tầm Nhìn Mới Appraisal Company Limited, DATC Real Estate Consulting Services JSC, and EXIM Appraisal JSC, to inflate asset values and secure fraudulent loans.

Trương Mỹ Lan's cash flow after withdrawing from SCB Bank.
1. Transfers out of SCB system (72.6%)
2. Cash withdrawals (15.6%)
3. Repayment of old loans at SCB (10.9%)
4. Internal transfers within SCB (0.90%)

Between 2012 and 2022, using fraudulent loan schemes, Trương Mỹ Lan orchestrated the disbursement of fictitious or legally insufficient loans totaling over 1 quadrillion VND from Saigon Commercial Bank (SCB). As of October 2022, the total irrecoverable debt had reached 677 trillion VND. After deducting secured assets, the net financial damage was estimated at 498 trillion VND. According to the investigation agency, Trương Mỹ Lan is accused of embezzling SCB assets worth more than 304 trillion VND, along with an additional 129 trillion VND in interest and other incurred costs. In total, Trương Mỹ Lan and her accomplices created 2,500 loans at Saigon Commercial Bank (SCB), disbursing 1.066 quadrillion VND, (Note: According to the Supreme People's Procuracy, this amount was calculated using the cumulative method, so only the cash flow from 1,284 loans, including 483,900 billion VND in principal debt, was traced. However, when disbursed, the actual amount was 525,400 billion VND.) which accounted for 93% of the bank’s total loans. This amount was equivalent to 10.7% of Vietnam’s GDP in 2022. Lan's disbursed amount was even three times the capital for constructing Long Thanh Airport and seven times the capital for constructing 12 North-South Expressway projects. After the loans were disbursed, Trương Mỹ Lan directed her subordinates to transfer funds from borrower companies to accounts belonging to non-existent legal entities or individuals. When necessary, she moved money between subsidiaries within the Vạn Thịnh Phát ecosystem. To withdraw cash externally, Lan instructed employees to falsify documents, legitimizing cash withdrawals through Saigon Commercial Bank (SCB). The money was then transported in vehicles to her private residence at Sherwood, 127 Pasteur Street, District 3, Ho Chi Minh City, or to the headquarters of Vạn Thịnh Phát Group. According to the investigation agency, between February 2019 and September 2022, a total of 108 trillion VND and 14.7 million USD (equivalent to 355 billion VND) were transported by drivers to these locations. During its operations, Saigon Commercial Bank (SCB) approved numerous transactions that did not meet the legal requirements for transferring funds abroad or bringing money back to Vietnam. To facilitate these transactions, Vạn Thịnh Phát Group used 12 companies registered in Vietnam and 11 companies established abroad. Between 2012 and 2022, a total of 78 outbound money transfers were conducted, amounting to 1.5 billion US dollars (equivalent to 35.361 trillion VND). Additionally, 152 inbound transfers brought over 3 billion USD (equivalent to 71.368 trillion VND) back into Vietnam. In total, cross-border transactions reached 4.5 billion USD (equivalent to more than 106.73 trillion VND). The coordination of these transfers was assigned by Trương Mỹ Lan to Trịnh Quang Công, Nguyễn Phương Anh, and Chiu Bing Keung Kenneth.

Vạn Thịnh Phát's bond debt to investors.
1. An Đông (80.9%)
2. Quang Thuận (4.90%)
3. Setra (6.50%)
4. Sunny World (7.80%)

In 2018, amid Vạn Thịnh Phát Group’s prolonged financial difficulties and mounting bad debts, Trương Mỹ Lan selected four companies—An Đông Company, Quang Thuận Company, Sunny World Company, and Setra Company—to issue bonds and raise funds from the public. These companies collectively raised 30.8 trillion VND through bond sales. The proceeds were then used to legitimize cash flows for eight subsidiaries of Vạn Thịnh Phát Group by repurchasing these bonds from the issuing companies. Sunny World's bond packages were marketed by Saigon-Hanoi Commercial Joint Stock Bank (SHB), while the remaining bonds were sold through contracts with TVSI Securities Company. The funds raised from these bond sales were subsequently transferred to Saigon Commercial Bank (SCB).

The specific amounts involved were as follows:

- An Đông Company: 30,738 investors purchased bonds totaling 25.3 trillion VND, of which 24.969 trillion VND remained unpaid.
- Sunny World Company: Issued 24 million bonds worth 2.4 trillion VND, with 1.6 trillion VND in unpaid debt.
- Quang Thuận Company: Issued 15 million bonds worth 1.5 trillion VND, which remained unpaid by 2,649 investors.
- Setra Company: Issued 20 million bonds worth 2 trillion VND, with outstanding debt owed to 2,431 investors.

Within two years, Vạn Thịnh Phát Group embezzled 30 trillion VND from more than 35,000 investors.

== Reaction ==
=== Domestic ===
==== Local Authorities ====
After Trương Mỹ Lan's arrest, SCB suffered a bank run, where a large number of depositors rushed to withdraw money from SCB branches and ATMs, causing significant cash flow disruptions at the bank. In response, media outlets quoted SCB officials reassuring the public that Lan’s arrest was related to bond violations at An Đông Company and was not connected to SCB’s operations. At the same time, the State Bank of Vietnam (SBV) pledged to implement measures to protect depositors' legitimate rights and interests while maintaining stability within SCB and the broader financial system. Authorities also urged the public to reconsider premature withdrawals from SCB.

On October 15, 2022, the SBV announced that SCB had been placed under special control. Officials from state-owned commercial banks, including Vietcombank, BIDV, VietinBank, and Agribank, were appointed to assist in managing and operating SCB. Over a month later, during a meeting of the Central Steering Committee on Anti-Corruption and Negative Phenomena, General Secretary Nguyễn Phú Trọng emphasized the need to strengthen inspections, supervision, audits, investigations, and the handling of corruption and economic cases, including the Vạn Thịnh Phát scandal. Addressing the issue of fugitives, Trọng stated, "If they flee abroad, they can be extradited," adding that "if not, they will be tried in absentia."

During the early days of the trial, Ho Chi Minh City Party Secretary Nguyễn Văn Nên described the Vạn Thịnh Phát case as "an unprecedented case for Ho Chi Minh City, a major criminal and economic case involving a large number of people." He stated that the trial was expected to last approximately 60 days and confirmed that this was only the first phase of proceedings. The second phase is expected to involve around 30,000 individuals. According to Nhân Dân newspaper, the Ministry of Justice has recovered assets worth up to 10 trillion VND from various corruption and economic cases. The General Department of Civil Judgment Enforcement has instructed that if defendants in the first phase of the trial do not appeal within 15 days, the Ho Chi Minh City Civil Judgment Enforcement Agency should take immediate measures to enforce judgments against individuals.

On April 12, 2024, during a discussion involving the Ministry of Public Security, the economic police announced that approximately 394.4 trillion VND had been recovered from the Vạn Thịnh Phát case. According to Reuters, the State Bank of Vietnam has provided an unprecedented "special loan" of 24 billion USD to SCB Bank from October 2022 to early 2024. Earlier, on the morning of March 14, Prime Minister Phạm Minh Chính and Deputy Prime Minister Lê Minh Khái held a national conference with business leaders and commercial banks to discuss Vietnam's monetary policy for 2024.

==== Media ====
According to Sài Gòn Giải Phóng newspaper, the second phase of the case highlighted significant legal loopholes and deficiencies in Vietnam's regulatory framework for securities, finance, and banking. The report also noted that the State Securities Commission, the Anti-Money Laundering Department (under the Banking Inspection and Supervision Agency), the State Bank of Vietnam, and the Foreign Exchange Management Department (under the State Bank) promptly detected violations within the Vạn Thịnh Phát ecosystem.

=== International ===
Michael Tatarski, a journalist based in Ho Chi Minh City, stated, "There is no doubt that more scandals and significant arrests are imminent." He noted that "an investigation into sand mining activities is underway" and that Vietnamese police are also scrutinizing the renewable energy sector and the Vietnam Electricity Corporation. According to BBC News, "this is the most dramatic trial to date" in General Secretary Nguyễn Phú Trọng's anti-corruption campaign.

Lê Hồng Hiệp from the ISEAS–Yusof Ishak Institute in Singapore suggested that the Communist Party of Vietnam aims to assert greater control over the free business culture in the South. He argued that by the end of 2016, Hanoi had nearly allowed Vietnamese-Chinese mafia groups to dominate the southern economy. He also warned that aggressively tackling corruption in Vietnam could potentially slow economic growth, stating that "corruption acts as a lubricant to help the [country's] machinery operate." Voice of America reported that this is "the most severe economic case in Vietnam's history" since Tăng Minh Phụng was executed for fraud related to Minh Phụng-EPCO in the late 20th and early 21st centuries. A Hanoi-based lawyer suggested that if Trương Mỹ Lan can recover most of the lost funds, she might avoid the death penalty. According to The Times of India, this case has shocked not only Vietnam but also the world, as it represents an unprecedented move in Vietnam's anti-corruption campaign.

Commenting on the verdict handed down by the Ho Chi Minh City People's Court, The Guardian described it as a severe and unusual sentence for a corruption case. Some observers believe it was fortunate that "the Vietnamese government handled the case without causing much damage to the economy." They also suggest that "the big question now is how to mitigate some of the losses, offset taxpayers' money, and return funds to SCB's customers." According to Al Jazeera, Michael Tatarski, host of the Vietnam Weekly podcast, stated that the financial scale of the case extends beyond Vietnam and may rank among the biggest financial scandals in world history. He also noted that never before has a corruption case been reported and scrutinized in such detail by Vietnamese state media.

According to Time magazine, Lê Thanh Hải, former Secretary of the Ho Chi Minh City Party Committee, and Lê Hoàng Quân, former Chairman of the Ho Chi Minh City People's Committee, may be implicated in the case. Both were disciplined and dismissed by the Central Inspection Commission in March 2020 for violations related to the Thủ Thiêm New Urban Area. The magazine also suggested that their actions facilitated Trương Mỹ Lan’s rapid rise, ultimately contributing to her downfall.
