= Trần Tuấn Anh =

Vietnamese politician (born 1964)

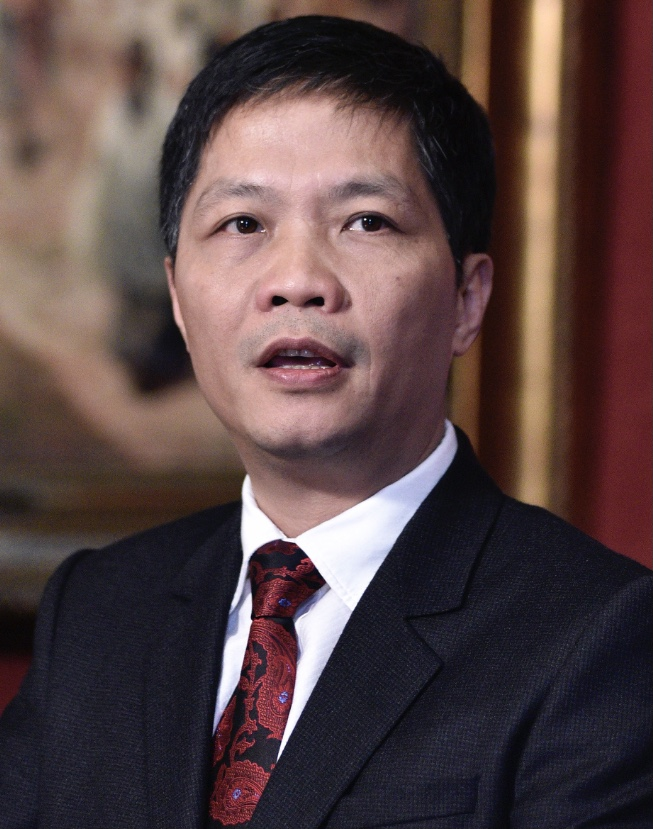

Head of Central Economic Committee
- In office 6 February 2021 – 31 January 2024
- Preceded by: Nguyễn Văn Bình
- Succeeded by: Trần Lưu Quang

Minister of Industry and Trade
- In office 9 April 2016 – 7 April 2021
- Prime Minister: Nguyễn Xuân Phúc; Phạm Minh Chính
- Preceded by: Vũ Huy Hoàng
- Succeeded by: Nguyễn Hồng Diên

Personal details
- Born: April 6, 1964 (age 62) Hanoi, North Vietnam
- Party: Communist Party of Vietnam
- Spouse: Trần Thủy Hương
- Parents: Trần Đức Lương (father); Nguyễn Thị Vinh (mother)
- Education: Diplomatic Academy of Vietnam

Trần Tuấn Anh (Vietnamese pronunciation: [t͡ɕən˨˩ twən˧˦ ʔajŋ̟˧˧]; born 6 April 1964 in Hanoi) is a Vietnamese politician. His family is originally from Đức Phổ District, Quảng Ngãi Province. He was the Minister of Industry and Trade of Vietnam and a member of the National Assembly of Vietnam 14th term of 2016-2021 of the delegation of the National Assembly of Quảng Ngãi. He attended the Central Economic Commission on February 6, 2021 but resigned in 2024. Before, he had been President of Ho Chi Minh City University of Industry, Vice Chairman of People's Committee of Cần Thơ City and Consul General of Vietnam in San Francisco. Between 2011 and 2013, he was also rector of the Industrial University of Ho Chi Minh City.

Anh became member of the Communist Party of Vietnam on November 29, 1996.

== Personal life ==
His father was Trần Đức Lương, who would later serve as the 5th President of Vietnam. Anh was born in Hanoi, as his father was a geologist of the Geological Mapping Division of Vietnam from 1955 to 1987, headquartered in Hanoi.
