= NHNN =

NHNN may refer to:

- National Hospital for Neurology and Neurosurgery in London, UK
- State Bank of Vietnam (Ngân hàng Nhà nước)
