= 2026 Vietnamese legislative election =

- 15 March 2026

All 500 seats in the National Assembly 251 seats needed for a majority
- Turnout: 99.70% ▲0.10 pp
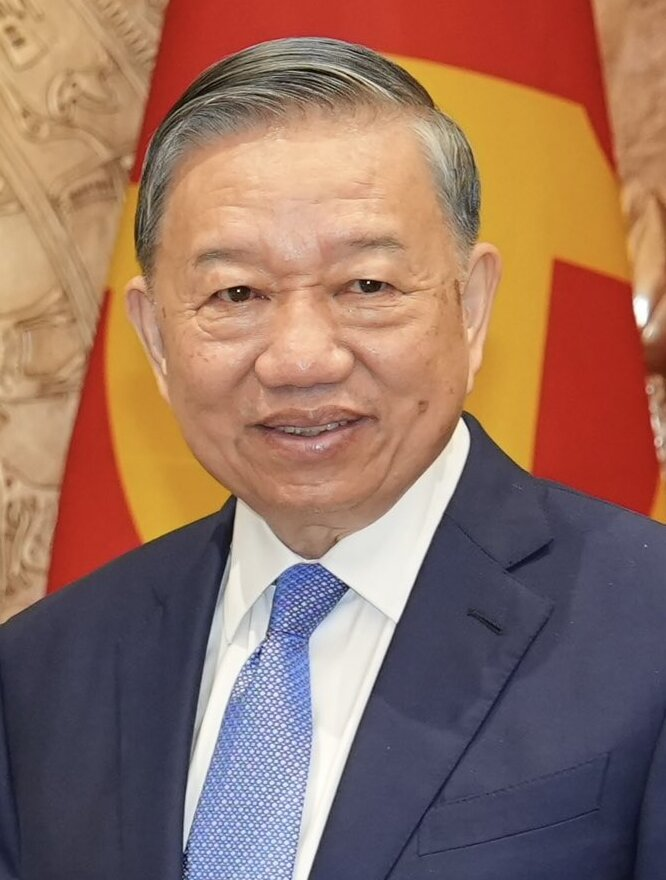

	Majority party	Minority party
Leader	Tô Lâm	–
Party	Communist Party	Independent
Alliance	Fatherland Front	Fatherland Front
Leader since	18 July 2024 (Note: Acting: 18 July – 3 August 2024)
Last election	485	14
Seats won	482	18
Seat change	▼3	▲4
- Results by province CPV: 70-80% 80-90% 90–99% 100%
Prime Minister before election
Phạm Minh Chính
Communist Party
Elected Prime Minister
Lê Minh Hưng
Communist Party

Legislative elections were held in Vietnam on 15 March 2026. Early elections were held in the islands of the South Central Coast, Mekong Delta and Southeast regions from 26 February 2026.

This election has elected the 16th National Assembly of Vietnam, which would eventually appoint Trần Thanh Mẫn as the National Assembly Chairman, Tô Lâm as President, Lê Minh Hưng as the Prime Minister alongside his cabinet, constituting the Vietnamese 2026–2031 administration.

The results were announced on 21 March 2026, paving the way for the 16th National Assembly's inaugural session, which convened on 6 April 2026.

== Electoral system ==
The members of the National Assembly are elected from 184 multi-member constituencies using the two-round system, with a maximum number of 500 candidates to be elected. Block voting is used, with each district having two or three seats. Candidates have to receive at least 50% of the vote in the first round to be elected, with a second round held on a plurality basis.

== Background ==
All participating candidates and elected members are expected to be nominal members of the Vietnamese Fatherland Front. Meanwhile, for the ruling Communist Party of Vietnam (CPV), the incumbent General Secretary of the Central Committee was Tô Lâm. After multiple rumors and speculations, the 14th National Congress of the Communist Party of Vietnam ultimately confirmed Tô Lâm to stay as the Party General Secretary for the next term, alongside the new Central Committee and Politburo, effectively platforming the Vietnamese political orientation for the 2026–2031 term.

== Candidates ==
A total of 864 candidates from 182 constituencies contested for 500 seats in the election. Of these, nearly 93% were members of the CPV, while 7.5% were independents; five candidates were self-nominated.

== Results ==
Party	Votes	%	Seats	+/–
Communist Party of Vietnam			482	–3
Independents			18	+4
Total			500	0
Valid votes	75,892,848	99.61		
Invalid/blank votes	298,705	0.39		
Total votes	76,191,553	100.00		
Registered voters/turnout	76,423,940	99.70		
Source: NEC, NEC, Vietnam.vn

== Response ==
On 19 March 2026, independent journalist Nguyễn Hoàng Vi was arrested, detained and beaten by police officers after posting critical comments about the legitimacy of the election on social media.
