= THP =

THP may refer to:

== Businesses and organisations ==
- Tan Hiep Phat Beverage Group, a Vietnamese drink producer
- Tennessee Highway Patrol, an American law enforcement agency
- Texas Highway Patrol, another American law enforcement agency
- The Hunger Project, an American non-profit

== Mathematics ==
- Tomlinson-Harashima precoding, to reduce the impact of communications interference
- Trembling-hand perfection, in game theory

== Science and medicine ==
- Tamm–Horsfall protein (also known as uromodulin), a glycoprotein found in urine
- Tetrahydropalmatine, a plant alkaloid
- Tetrahydroprogesterone, any of four stereoisomer neurosteroid metabolites of progesterone with the word pregnanolone
- Tetrahydropyran, an organic chemical
- THP-1 cell line, a human cell line derived from a leukemia patient used in immunocytochemical analysis
- Trihexyphenidyl, an antiparkinsonian agent

== Other uses ==
- THP Orchestra, a 1970s Canadian disco band
- Thermal hydrolysis process, a sewage treatment method
- Turbo High Pressure, a Prince engine variant
