= Industrial University of Ho Chi Minh City =

University in Go Vap District, Ho Chi Minh City, Vietnam

Coordinates: 10.9384°N 106.8243°E

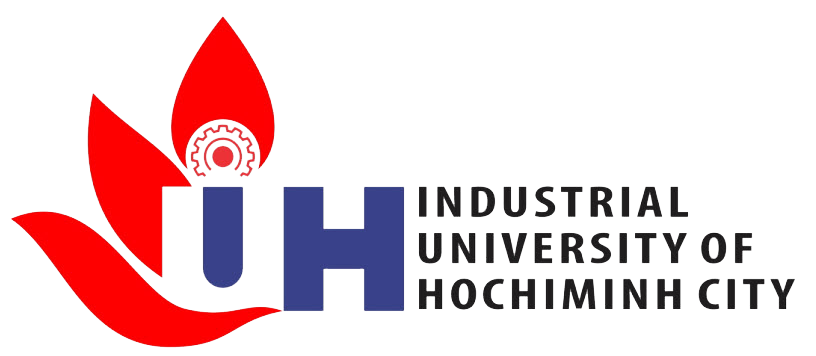
- Established: November 11, 1956
- Principal: Dr. Phan Hồng Hải
- Location: 12 Nguyễn Văn Bảo, Ward 1, Gò Vấp District, Ho Chi Minh City
- Campus: Urban
- Website: www.iuh.edu.vn/en

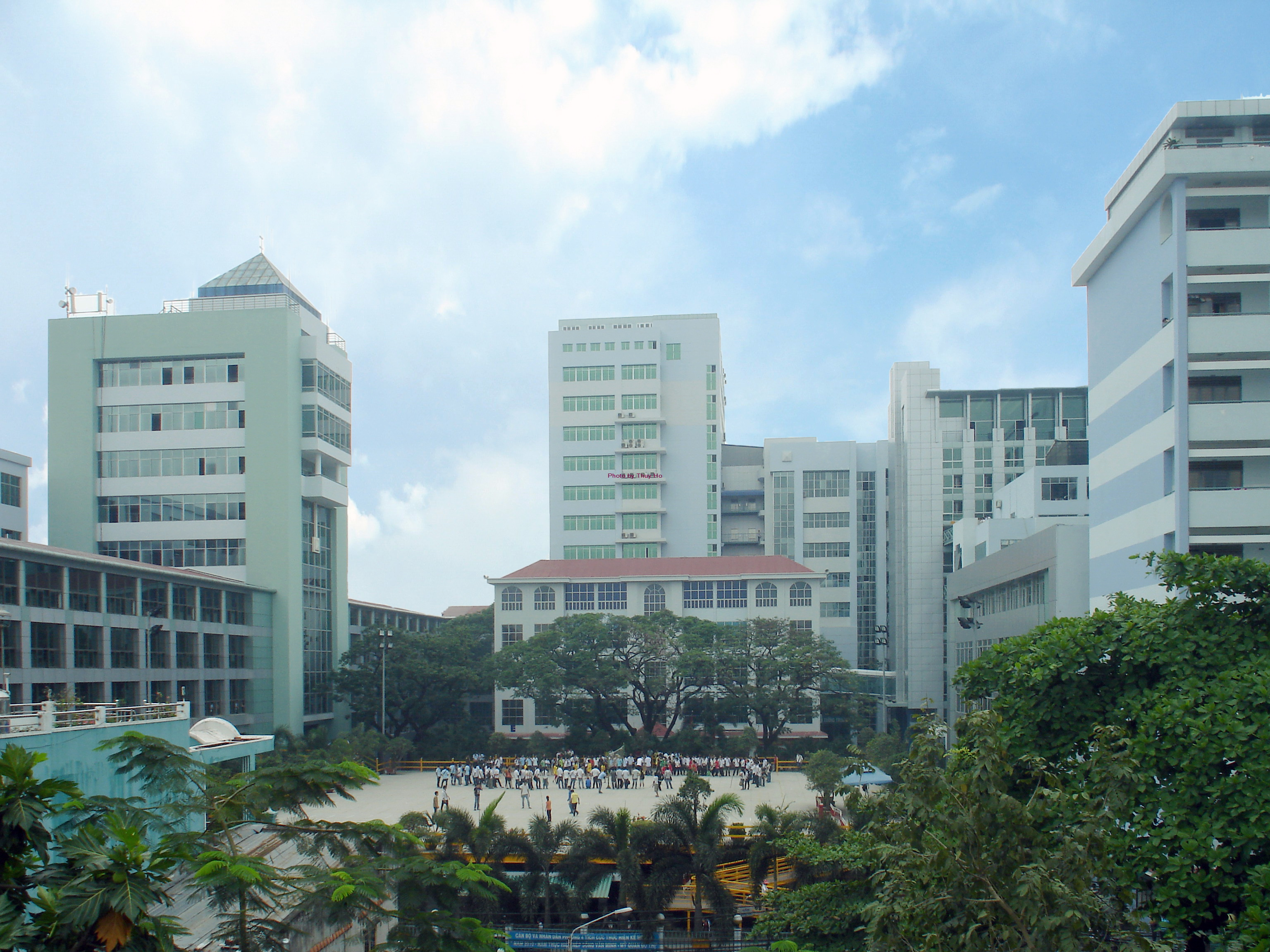

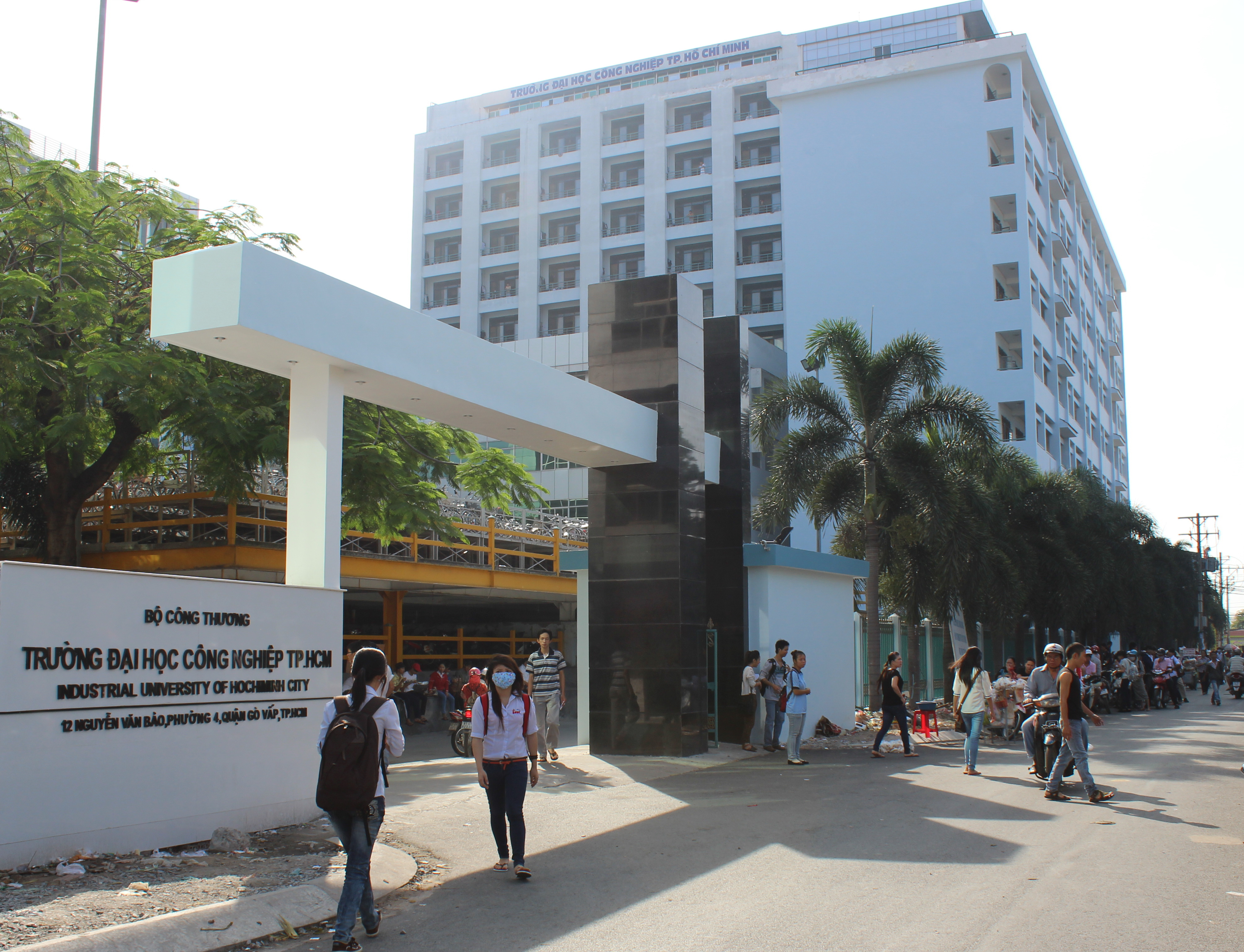

The Industrial University of Ho Chi Minh City (IUH), formerly known as Ho Chi Minh University of Industry (esquire: HUI) (Vietnamese: Trường Đại học Công nghiệp Thành phố Hồ Chí Minh) (esquire: ĐHCN TP. HCM), is a university in Go Vap District, Ho Chi Minh City, Vietnam. It is one of technical universities in the city. The university has 2,000 employees, including about 1,600 teachers and 200 guest trainers who are invited from universities, scientific institutes, and industry. University of Industry School, Ho Chi Minh City is working under the management of the Ministry of Industry and Trade. The total number of students in the university in 2011 was approximately 129,000. (According to the report of the Conference of the academic year (2010–2011) by Dr. Dean. Anh Tuan Tran)

In 2020 the university was ranked in the top 650 of Asian universities of the QS World University Rankings.

== Brief history and development ==
- The precursor of the school vocational career Go Vap is a private vocational school by the friars Salesians of Don Bosco in Vietnam established on November 11, 1956 in Hanh Thong commune, Go Vap District, Gia Định Province, Saigon city, Republic of Vietnam. As Father Peter Cuisset (Quy) and Father Isidoro Huong Le operating base line Don Bosco Go Vap (1956–1973)
- By 1968, the school vocational career, Go Vap was renamed.Don Bosco Technical Schools, Go Vap. Decision 6224 GD/TT/2D Secretary of the Ministry of Education, allows priests Le Huong been open The school and Secondary level II (Vietnam) - Don Bosco Technical schools. [Go Vap], August 24, 1967, the Secretary of the Ministry of Education, Huynh Ngoc Anh (signed)
- Early in 1970, the school was upgraded from junior level has become the high schools ranks. Don Bosco High Technical schools. By Father John Ty Van Nguyen as Director cum Principal and Father Cho Dinh Phan, Deputy Director, school administration (1973–1975).
- At the end of 1975, the Vietnam government requisitioned campus and December 19, 1975, the school was handed over to the General Department of Metallurgy Engineering and Electronics.
- On January 1, 1976; school running back with the name School Technical Don Bosco.
- In 1978, the school was renamed. School Worker Technical Four, of the Mechanical and Metallurgical.
- In 1994, Secondary School of Chemical stationed at Biên Hòa city, Đồng Nai Province had merger into The High School of Industrial Engineering Four, under the Ministry of Industry.
- March 1999, the School was upgraded to College Industry Four of the Ministry of Industry.
- On December 24, 2004, the school was upgraded to a University of Industry, Ho Chi Minh City, under the Ministry of Industry and Trade.

== List of principals ==
- (1956 - 1973) Father Isiđôrô Lê Hướng (Died);
- (1973 - 1975) Father John Nguyễn Văn Ty (Died);
- (1975 - 1991) BSEE. Lâm Ngọc Anh (Died);
- (1991 - 1996) BEng. Mai Văn Hợi (Died);
- (1996 - 2011) Hero of Labor (Vietnam) of reform era - Dr. Tạ Xuân Tề
- (2011 - 2013) Dr. Trần Tuấn Anh.
- (2013 - 2015) Dr. Nguyễn Thiên Tuế, acting
- (2015 - 2020) Dr. Nguyễn Thiên Tuế
- (2020–present) Dr. Phan Hồng Hải

== Achievements ==
- Third-class Labor Medal in 1995;
- Second-class Labor Medal in 1999;
- First-Class Labor Medal in 2004;
- As the first university of Vietnam receives ISO certification by TUV - Federal Republic of Germany

== Structure ==
=== Office functions ===
Office of Organization - Administration; Training Division; Office of Accounting - Financial; Office of Political Affairs and Student Affairs; Office of Management Training - Sciences and Graduate; Office of International Cooperation; Office of Planning - Supplies; Office of Service; Management Center - Dormitory.

=== The training unit ===
The unit directly perform tasks training and department under:

- Specialized training courses: Faculty of Information Technology, Faculty of Mechanical Engineering, Faculty of Electrical Technology, Electronics Technology Department, Faculty of Computers Fashion, Department of Chemical Engineering, Faculty of Technology O Cars, Faculty of Technology refrigeration, Faculty of Foreign Languages, Faculty of Business Administration, Department of Banking and Finance, Auditing Department, Tourism Department of Commerce, National Institute for Biotechnology & Food Science and Technology Institute and Environmental Management.
- Training courses non-majors: Faculty of Reasoning - Politics, Faculty of Basic Sciences, Faculty of university links was working and learning

== The service units for training and scientific research ==
- The unit supports training and scientific research:

Journal of Industrial University, Publisher of industry University, HCM City; Station Health; Information Center - Library.

- The training service unit under the Industrial University of HCM City

Testing center and quality control training, Faculty of Continuing Education, Centre for Training, Research and Development, Center Technology - Industrial (Industrial Research & Development for technology - Machinery)

=== The council ===
Council of Scientific and Training:

- The functions, duties and composition of the Board shall comply with the Charter and university establishment decision of the Rector of the University of Industry, Ho Chi Minh City. Council is responsible for advising the principal on a specific job, such as goals, training programs, long-term plans and annual plans educational development - education, science and technology schools, training and retraining of faculty, staff and employees ...
- The other councils:

Based on the specific tasks of the school, the principal may decide to set up a number of advisory boards including the Board of Admissions, Rank Promotion Council, Council salaries, recruitment Council Council emulation - Bonus Disciplinary Council, the Council of liquidating assets and other assemblies as needed ... to help principals decide basics, the important content of the training creation, organization - personnel, scientific research (scientific research), infrastructure and the implementation of policies and guidelines of the Party and State law. The composition of the Council by the Principal decided to set up under the provisions of existing laws.

=== Scientific research achievements ===
- Period 2007 - 2008, there are 01 state-level projects, 03 projects of the 06 projects at school;
- Period 2009 - 2010, there are 06 state-level projects, 30 projects of Ministry Industry and hundreds of projects of School level for local and projects approved.

== Campus ==
The university has three campuses:

- Main campus:12 Nguyen Van Bao Street, Ward 4, Go Vap District, HCMC
