= Nguyễn Văn Bình (politician) =

Vietnamese politician

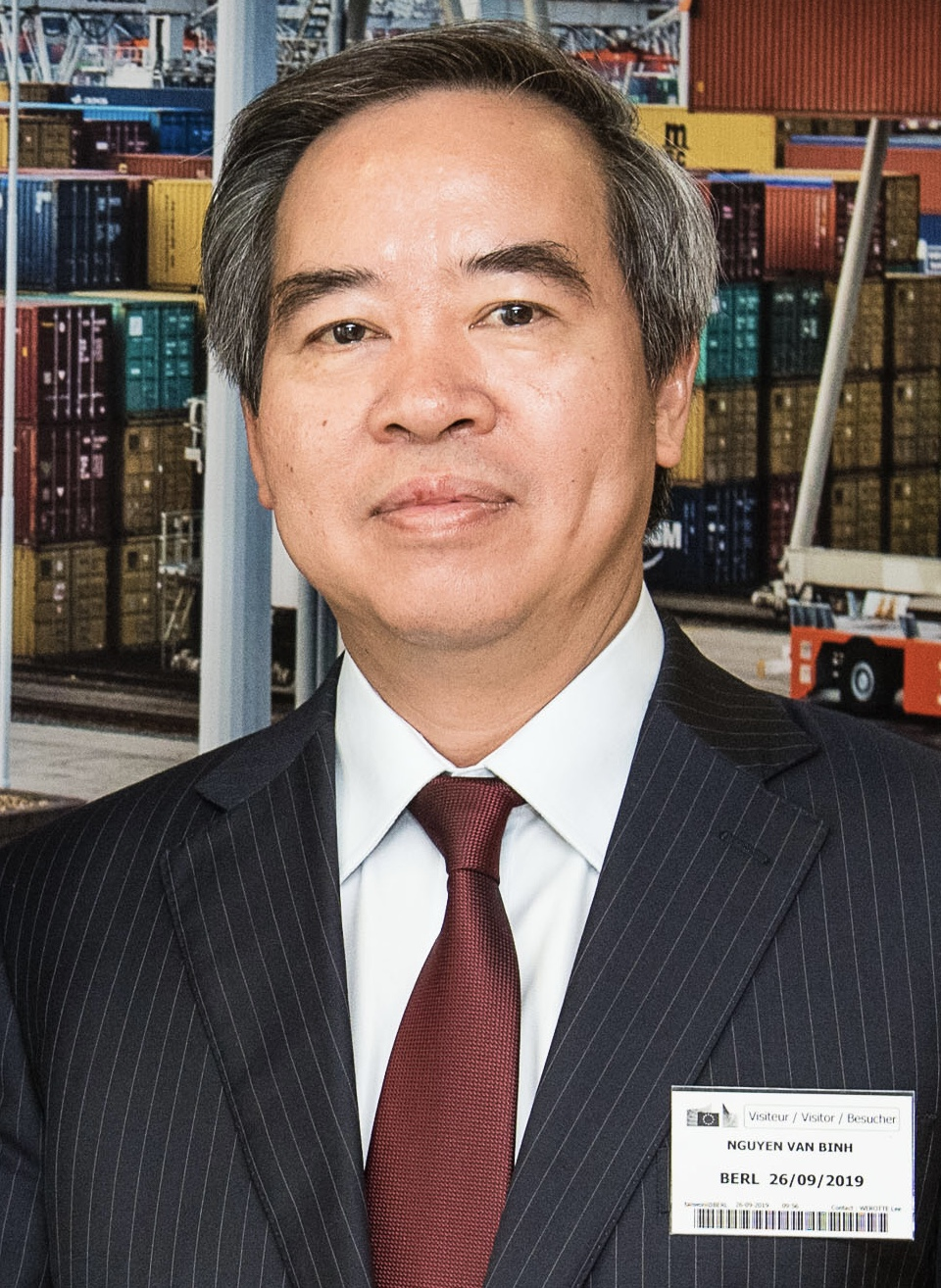

Head of the Party Central Economic Commission
- In office 11 April 2016 – 5 February 2021
- Preceded by: Vương Đình Huệ
- Succeeded by: Trần Tuấn Anh

Governor of the State Bank
- In office 3 August 2011 – 8 April 2016
- Prime Minister: Nguyễn Xuân Phúc
- Preceded by: Nguyễn Văn Giàu
- Succeeded by: Lê Minh Hưng

Personal details
- Born: 4 March 1961 (age 65) Phú Thọ Province, Vietnam
- Party: Communist Party of Vietnam
- Profession: Doctor of Science
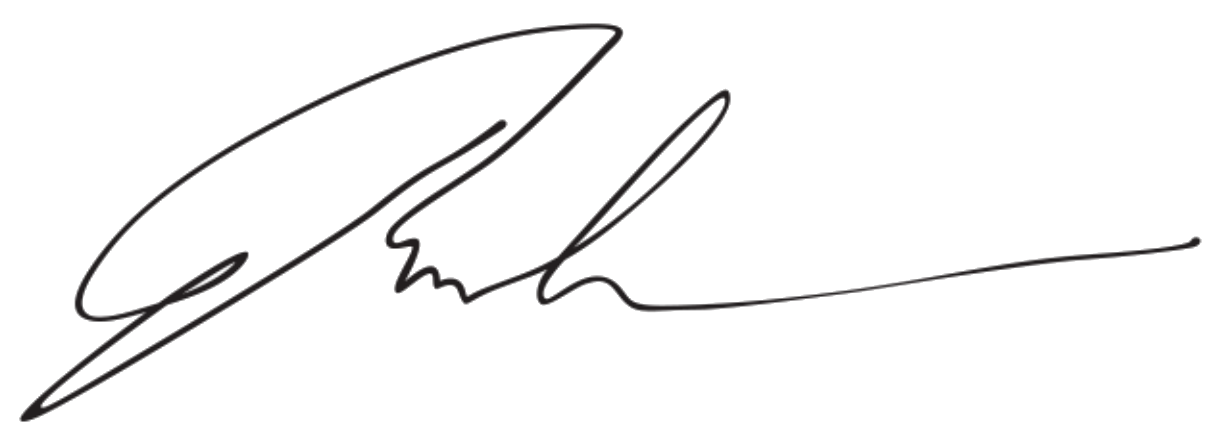
- Signature

Nguyễn Văn Bình (Vietnamese pronunciation: [ŋwiən˦ˀ˥ van˧˧ ʔɓïŋ˨˩]; born 4 March 1961 in Phú Thọ Province) was governor of the State Bank of Vietnam from 2011 to 2016. He is a member of the CPV Central Committee, tenure 11. He was appointed as Governor of the State Bank of Việt Nam at the first session of the 13th National Assembly. He was replaced as Governor of the State Bank, with Lê Minh Hưng taking his place on 9 April 2016.
