= Trương Mỹ Lan =

Chinese-Vietnamese businesswoman and criminal (born 1956)

- Born: 13 October 1956 (age 69); Saigon, South Vietnam
- Occupation: Businesswoman
- Years active: 1992–2022
- Title: Founder and director of Vạn Thịnh Phát Group
- Spouse: Eric Chu Nap Kee
- Children: 2
- Criminal information
- Years active: 2012–2022
- Convictions: Embezzlement; bribe; mortgage fraud
- Penalty: Death, commuted to life imprisonment

Details
- Date apprehended: 6 October 2022; 4 years ago

Trương Mỹ Lan (Vietnamese pronunciation: [t͡ɕɯɤŋ1 miːʔ4 lʷaːn1]; born 13 October 1956) is a Vietnamese businesswoman who founded the real estate development group Vạn Thịnh Phát Group, of which she is on the board of directors. A key figure in Vietnam's largest, multi-billion-dollar financial fraud, Lan was sentenced to death for embezzlement, bribery, and violations of banking regulations on 11 April 2024, before the sentence was commuted to life imprisonment in 2025.

In October 2022, she was arrested for using fake loan applications to embezzle more than US$12.5 billion from Sai Gon Joint Stock Commercial Bank, which she controlled through more than two dozen middlemen. This caused a bank run.

In March 2024 the trial for embezzlement, bribery, and violating banking regulations began. It is considered the largest corruption scandal in Southeast Asia's history. She was convicted and sentenced to death the following month. Her death sentence was eventually commuted to life imprisonment in 2025, after Vietnam abolished the death penalty for embezzlement.

== Early life and education ==
Trương Mỹ Lan was born on 13 October 1956, in Saigon, South Vietnam. Her family is of Teochew heritage, from the village of Gezhou (Chinese: 葛洲) in Shantou, Guangdong; settling in "Little Gezhou" (Chinese: 浸石), Saigon (Ho Chi Minh City). Her uncle founded the maritime business Hòa Thuận Phát (Chinese: 和順發) in Chợ Lớn.

== Career ==
Lan originally owned a business for hair accessories in Ho Chi Minh City. Her connections to the government led her to enter the real estate business. In 1992, she founded and chaired the board of directors of Vạn Thịnh Phát Group (Chinese: 萬盛發集團), a real estate firm for luxury residential buildings, offices, hotels, and shopping centers and also financial services.

From 2012 until 2022, Lan controlled Sai Gon Joint Stock Commercial Bank (SCB), Vietnam's largest bank by assets in Ho Chi Minh City. SCB was established in 2012 from the merger of three banks facing bankruptcy in 2011; nevertheless, the State Bank of Vietnam allowed the merger of these three banks, with Trương Mỹ Lan's continued control through more than two dozen middlemen, and 93 percent of loans going to her company and associated shell companies.

== Legal issues and convictions ==
=== 2022 arrest ===
Lan was arrested on 6 October 2022 after years of investigation. She was accused of illegally issuing bonds worth tens of millions of U.S. dollars in 2018 and 2019 and using 916 fake loan applications to appropriate more than 304 trillion dong (US$12.5 billion) from Sai Gon Joint Stock Commercial Bank, of which she owned more than 90 percent of the shares, from 9 February 2018 to 7 October 2022. After three SCB employees committed suicide, on 6, 9 and 14 October, a bank run ensued.

The arrest and trial were considered part of the anti-corruption policy of leader Nguyễn Phú Trọng, who described it as a "blazing furnace" (đốt lò).

=== 2024 trial ===
On 5 March 2024, the trial began at the Ho Chi Minh City People's Court. At US$12.5 billion, it is considered the largest corruption scandal in Southeast Asia; by comparison, the Malaysian 1MDB scandal in the 2010s involved €4.1 billion.

Besides her husband and niece, there were 82 more defendants; "45 are former leaders of SCB, 15 former State Bank of Vietnam officers, three Government Inspectorate officers, and one former officer from the State Audit Office....Five of the former leaders of SCB are now in hiding."

On 11 April 2024, Lan was sentenced to death by lethal injection, for embezzlement. All the other defendants were also found guilty and given sentences ranging from three years (suspended) to life imprisonment. Her husband and niece were sentenced to nine and seventeen years respectively.

On 19 September 2024, state media reported that a second trial had begun in which Lan and 33 other defendants were accused of money laundering and selling illegal bonds. The suit alleges that Lan illegally transferred US$4.5 billion in and out of Vietnam between 2012 and 2022 using 21 companies controlled by Lan's real estate company. On 17 October, she was convicted and sentenced to life imprisonment on the said charges, alongside the death sentence she had already received.

Lan lost her appeal against the death sentence on 3 December 2024; to avoid the death penalty and get the sentence commuted to life imprisonment, Lan must repay $11 billion, equivalent to three-quarters of the total amount she embezzled.

On 21 April 2025, Lan's life sentence for "fraudulent appropriation of assets" was reduced to 20 years by an appeals court. However, as the death penalty she received has already taken legal effect, Lan is still subject to the death sentence.

In May 2025, from prison, Lan sent a letter to the authorities requesting a reevaluation of her assets, which were being liquidated to comply with court orders. She claimed that the assessed value of VND 253.5 trillion was undervalued and asked to be allowed to participate in the asset valuation and handling process. Her stated goal was to maximize financial returns for the State.

=== 2025 commutation of death sentence ===
On 25 June 2025, the death penalty was abolished for embezzlement, drug trafficking and several offences against the state. It was still retained for ten offences like murder, child rape, treason and terrorism. Additionally, it was decreed that for those sentenced to death prior to 1 July 2025 but have not yet been executed, their sentences would be commuted to life in prison.

As a result of this legal change, Truong would have her death sentence commuted to life imprisonment.

== Personal life ==
Lan is married to Eric Chu Nap Kee (Chinese: 朱立基, Vietnamese: Chu Lập Cơ), a businessman in the real estate sector in Hong Kong. In March 2024, her husband was also summoned to the trial, as well as her niece Trương Huệ Vân, age 34, the CEO of a property management firm, whose spouse is Vietnamese-Australian singer Thanh Bùi.

Lan's family is one of the richest families in Vietnam. Lan's embezzlement of $12.5 billion equals about three percent of Vietnam's total GDP for 2022.

In March 2024, her niece, who had lived with her since childhood, admitted that she established 52 shell companies and four regular companies to obtain 155 loans at SCB.

== See also ==
- List of fraudsters
- Corruption in Vietnam
- Capital punishment in Vietnam
