= Nguyễn Thị Hồng (economist) =

Vietnamese economist

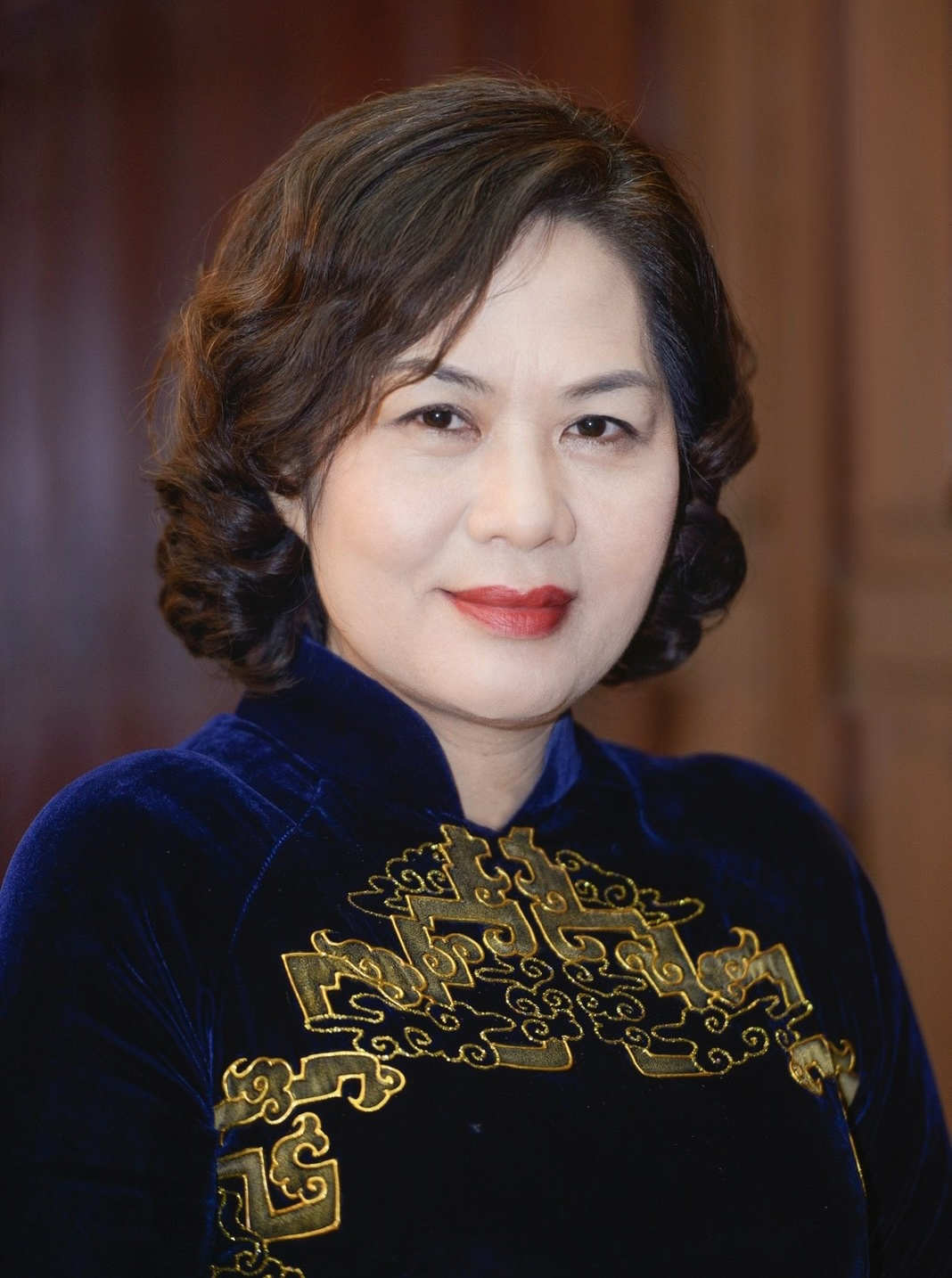
- Hồng in 2024

Vice Chairwoman of the National Assembly of Vietnam
- Incumbent
- Assumed office 6 April 2026
- Chairman: Trần Thanh Mẫn
- Preceded by: Nguyễn Đức Hải

Governor of State Bank of Vietnam
- In office 12 November 2020 – 8 April 2026
- Prime Minister: Nguyễn Xuân Phúc; Phạm Minh Chính
- Preceded by: Lê Minh Hưng
- Succeeded by: Phạm Đức Ấn

Personal details
- Born: March 27, 1968 (age 58) Cầu Giấy District, Hanoi
- Party: Communist Party of Vietnam
- Education: National Economics University

Nguyễn Thị Hồng is Vietnamese economist, serving as Vice Chairwoman of the National Assembly of Vietnam. She served as the governor of the State Bank of Vietnam (SBV) from 2020 to 2026 and was the first woman to hold this position.

== Education ==
Hồng graduated with a bachelor's degree from the Banking Academy of Vietnam and a master's degree in economics from the National Economics University.

== Career ==
Hồng started working at the State Bank of Vietnam (SBV) in 1991, where she held management positions.

In January 2012, Hồng was appointed as the Director of the Monetary Policy Department. On August 16, 2014, she was appointed as the Deputy Governor of the State Bank of Vietnam.

On August 21, 2019, Hồng was reappointed as the Deputy Governor of the State Bank of Vietnam. On August 17, 2020, she was elected as the Secretary of the Party Committee of the Central Bank. In November 2020, Hồng was nominated by the Vietnamese Government to be approved for the position of Governor of the State Bank of Vietnam, replacing Lê Minh Hưng.

On 12 November 2020, Hồng was appointed SBV Governor.

== Awards ==
In 2023, Hồng became one of three central bank chiefs to be rated A+ in the annual Central Banker Report Cards by Global Finance. She won the Central Banker of the Year 2023 award by The Banker in the Asia-Pacific category.
