= Lê Minh Hưng =

Vietnamese politician (born 1970)

His Excellency Lê Minh Hưng
- Hưng in 2026

9th Prime Minister of Vietnam
- Incumbent
- Assumed office 7 April 2026
- President: Tô Lâm
- Deputy: Phạm Gia Túc
- Preceded by: Phạm Minh Chính

Head of the Central Organization Commission
- In office 16 May 2024 – 8 April 2026
- Preceded by: Trương Thị Mai
- Succeeded by: Nguyễn Duy Ngọc

Chief of the Party Central Committee Office
- In office 20 October 2020 – 3 June 2024
- General Secretary: Nguyễn Phú Trọng
- Preceded by: Nguyễn Văn Nên
- Succeeded by: Nguyễn Duy Ngọc

Governor of the State Bank of Vietnam
- In office 9 April 2016 – 20 October 2020
- Preceded by: Nguyễn Văn Bình
- Succeeded by: Nguyễn Thị Hồng

Personal details
- Born: 11 December 1970 (age 55) Hương Sơn, Hà Tĩnh, North Vietnam
- Party: Communist
- Spouse: Đào Thị Bích Thủy
- Parent(s): Lê Minh Hương (father); Phạm Thị Hiền (mother)
- Education: VNU University of Languages and International Studies (BA); Saitama University (MPP, MEcon)

Lê Minh Hưng (Vietnamese pronunciation: [le˧˧ mïŋ˧˧ hɨŋ˧˧]; born 11 December 1970) is a Vietnamese economist and politician who is serving as the 9th Prime Minister of Vietnam since 2026. A member of the Politburo, he was previously the Head of the Central Organization Commission, and Chief of the Office of the Central Committee. In 2016, at the age of 46, Hưng became the second-youngest Governor in the history of the State Bank of Vietnam, a position he held until 2020 in the cabinet of Nguyễn Xuân Phúc. At the 14th Party Congress, he was elevated to the Politburo and quickly became the presumptive designate to succeed Phạm Minh Chính as the Prime Minister.

== Education ==
Hưng graduated from Vietnam National University with a Bachelor of Arts in French culture and language, and holds a master's degree in economics and public policy from Saitama University, Japan. He also attended a market economy and financial analysis course at the Shanghai University of Finance and Economics (SUFE) in 1996.

== State Bank of Vietnam ==
In January 2010, Hưng was appointed as a member of the Central Committee of the Communist Party of Vietnam and Director General of the Personnel and Organization Department at the State Bank of Vietnam. In October 2011, then-Prime Minister Nguyễn Tấn Dũng appointed him as Deputy Governor. Hưng continued serving as a member of the Party Committee, assisting Central Committee member Nguyễn Văn Bình, who at the time was the Secretary of the Party Committee and Governor of the State Bank of Vietnam.

In January 2016, at the 12th National Congress of the Communist Party of Vietnam, Hưng was elected as a member of the Central Committee for the 2016–2021 term.

At the beginning of the new term, then-Prime Minister Nguyễn Xuân Phúc nominated and recommended Hưng for the position of Governor of the State Bank of Vietnam. On 9 April 2016, the 14th National Assembly of Vietnam conducted a secret ballot, with 403 out of 486 votes in favor (81.58%), approving Hưng's appointment as Governor. Hưng was subsequently appointed by then-President Trần Đại Quang as Governor of the State Bank of Vietnam, replacing Bình, who was reassigned as Head of the Central Economic Commission of the Communist Party of Vietnam.

Hưng was appointed by the Central Committee as Secretary of the Party Committee of the State Bank of Vietnam, becoming the youngest leader of the State Bank at the age of 46, and the youngest ministerial-level official and head of a sector in the Government of Vietnam for the 2016–2021 term in Phúc's cabinet.

During nearly one full term leading the country's financial and banking sector, Hưng and Deputy Governor Nguyễn Thị Hồng directed policies to address monetary issues in Vietnam, including controlling inflation, restructuring poor-performing banks, reducing interest rates, directing credit toward production and business activities, and lowering bad debts. By 2020, on-balance-sheet non-performing loans (NPLs) in the credit institution system had been further resolved, controlled, and maintained below 3%.

On 11 November 2020, Phúc submitted a proposal to the 14th National Assembly to approve Hưng's dismissal from the position. After the dismissal, Hưng stepped down, concluding more than 20 years of service in the fields of finance, currency, and banking, and moving on to a new phase in his career.

== Central Committee of the Communist Party of Vietnam ==
During the series of Party Congresses from local to central levels in preparation for the 13th National Congress of the Communist Party of Vietnam in 2021, on 15 October 2020, the Politburo of the Communist Party of Vietnam decided to appoint Hưng as Chief of the Office of the Central Committee, replacing Nguyễn Văn Nên, who had been introduced to be the Secretary of the Ho Chi Minh City Party Committee. In this role, Hưng was responsible for advising and assisting the Central Committee - directly the Politburo and the Secretariat - in organising and coordinating the Party's leadership activities, coordinating the work of central advisory bodies, advising on principles and regulations for managing Party finances and assets, directly managing the finances and assets of central Party agencies, ensuring logistical support for Party activities, and serving as a central hub for information to support leadership.

On 30 January 2021, at the 13th National Congress, Hưng was elected as a full member of the 13th Central Committee of the Party. On 31 January 2021, at the first plenary session of the 13th Central Committee, he was elected as a member of the Party Secretariat.

On 16 May 2024, the Politburo assigned Hưng - then a member of the Secretariat and Chief of the Central Committee Office, to serve as Head of the Central Organization Commission.

On 7 February 2026, Hưng announced that the Politburo would establish a Central Steering Committee to oversee amendments and supplements to the Party Charter. The Politburo and the Secretariat requested relevant bodies to propose necessary revisions to ensure the Charter aligns with practical conditions and meets the requirements of the new era, with plans to revise it alongside the Political Platform at the 15th Party Congress (2031), marking the Party's 100th anniversary in 2030. On 23 January 2026, at the 14th National Party Congress, Hưng was elected to the Politburo for the 14th Central Committee.

== Premiership (2026–present) ==
On 7 April 2026, Hưng was sworn in as the 9th Prime Minister of Vietnam, with 495 out of 495 votes in favor (100%). On 8 April 2026, General Secretary and President Tô Lâm appointed Hưng to be Vice Chairman of the National Defense and Security Council.

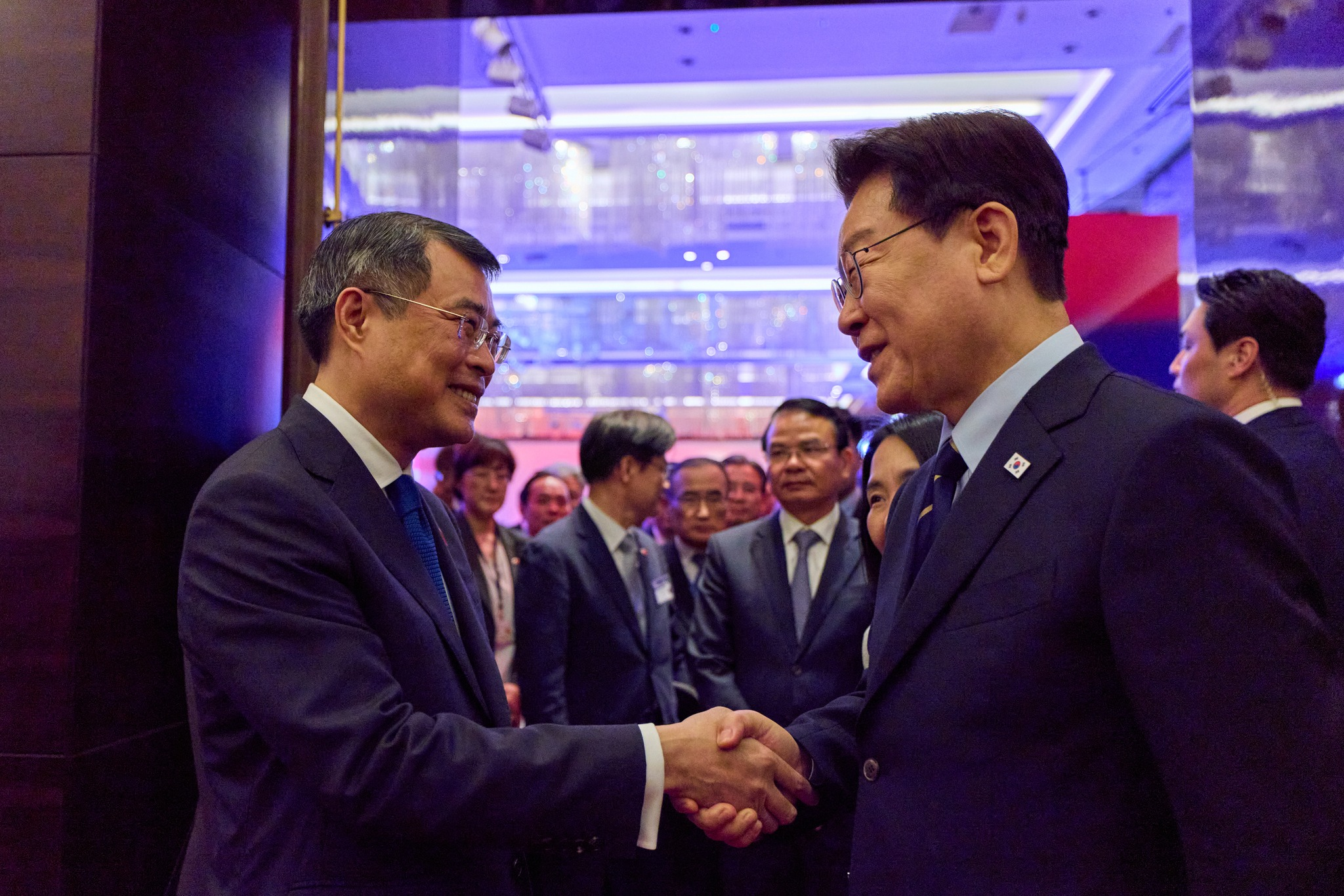
Hưng with South Korean President Lee Jae Myung in April 2026.

At his swearing-in ceremony, during his first speech as Prime Minister, Hưng stated the government will focus on five major key orientations, including "building a modern, enabling government that serves the people", "demonstrating strong determination and effort in managing the economy to achieve high and sustainable growth", "ensuring the effective operation of the organisational apparatus under the new administration system", "building a government that is united, coordinated, and collaborative", and "building a government that is honest, disciplined, resilient, and accountable."

Hưng is usually described as a technocrat.

== Personal life ==
Hưng was born on 11 December 1970 in Hương Sơn district, Hà Tĩnh. His father, Colonel General Lê Minh Hương, was the Minister of Public Security of Vietnam from 1996 to 2002.
