= Sai Gon Joint Stock Commercial Bank =

Major bank in Vietnam

Sai Gon Joint Stock Commercial Bank (SCB)
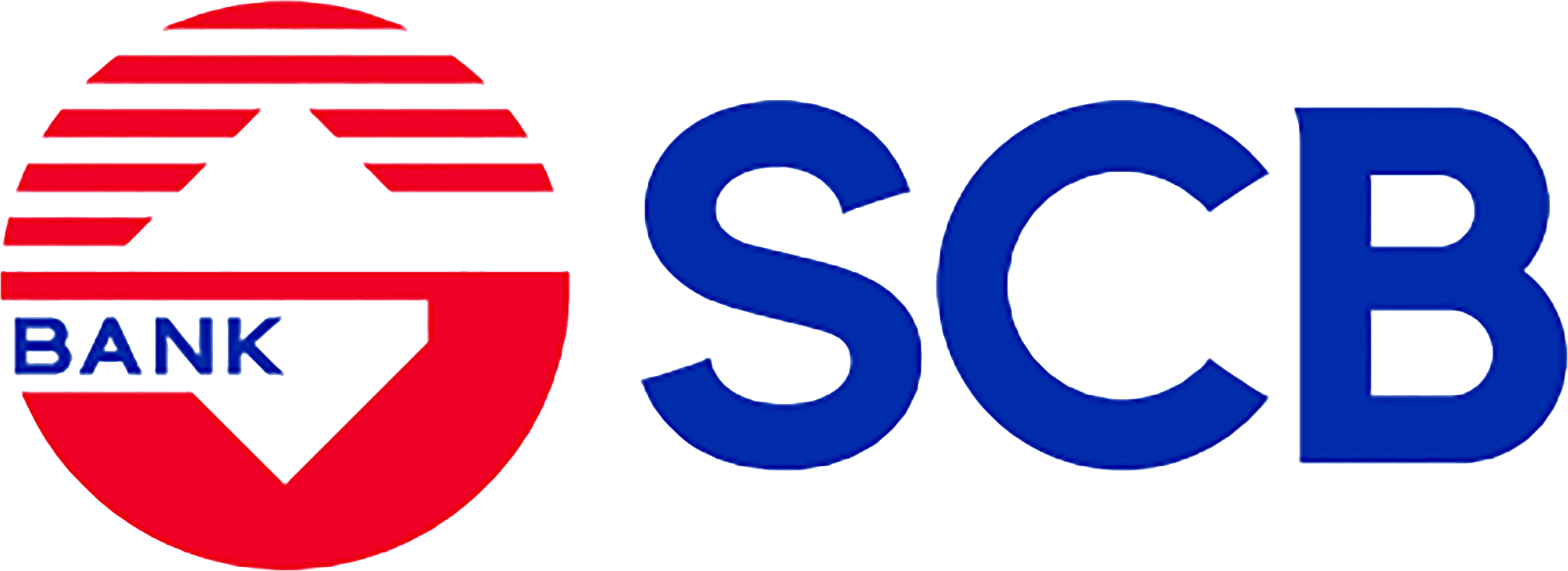
- Native name: Ngân hàng Thương mại Cổ phần Sài Gòn
- Industry: Financial services
- Founded: January 1, 2012; 14 years ago
- Headquarters: 242, Cống Quỳnh Boulevard, Bến Thành Ward, Ho Chi Minh City
- Area served: Vietnam
- Key people: Phan Đình Điền, Chairman of the Board; Phạm Quang Tiến, CEO
- Total assets: ▲673.276 billion VND (2021)
- Number of employees: 6,700 (2021)
- Website: scb.com.vn

Sai Gon Joint Stock Commercial Bank or Saigon Commercial Bank, abbreviated as SCB (Vietnamese: Ngân hàng Thương mại cổ phần Sài Gòn), is the largest commercial bank in Vietnam by assets, founded in 2012 and headquartered in Ho Chi Minh City. It was founded by the fusion of 3 small banks including Saigon Commercial Bank (Ngân hàng Sài Gòn; SCB) itself with Ficombank (Ngân hàng Việt Nam Đệ Nhất), TinNghia Bank (Ngân hàng Tín Nghĩa) and was controlled by businesswoman and real estate developer Trương Mỹ Lan. From 2012 until 2022 SCB issued Lan 93% of its loan portfolio, more than 2,500 loans worth over US$44 billion.

Her defrauding $11.5 billion and corruption is considered the largest fraud scandal in Southeast Asia's history and led to her arrest in 2022, causing a bank run. The bank is since under state control.

== History ==
Sai Gon Joint Stock Commercial Bank (SCB) was established in 2012 from the merger of three banks: First Bank (Ficombank), Vietnam Tin Nghia Bank (TinNghiaBank), and Saigon Bank (SCB), all of which were headquartered in Ho Chi Minh City. The three small banks were controlled by businesswoman and real estate developer Trương Mỹ Lan and had faced bankruptcy in 2011; The banks had invested their deposits in loans for risky real estate transactions, so customers pulled out their money. Nevertheless, the Vietnamese Central Bank allowed the fusion of these 3 banks, with continued control of Trương Mỹ Lan through more than 2 dozen middlemen, and 93 percent of loans going to her company Van Thinh Phat and associated straw companies. From 2012 until 2022 SCB issued Lan more than 2,500 loans worth over $44 billion, which was equivalent to 93% of SCBs loan portfolio.

As of September 30, 2021, SCB had total assets of over 673,276 billion VND and charter capital of over 20,020 billion VND. It has been Vietnam's largest bank by assets.

== Controversies ==
=== Bank run ===
On October 6, 2022, Truong My Lan, chairwoman of Van Thinh Phat Group, was arrested on charges of fraud in the issuance and trading of An Dong bonds. Vietnamese sources refer to October 8.

This led to a bank run, a massive withdrawal of money by customers at SCB.

=== Scandal ===
As of November 2023, many customers' savings deposits at SCB were converted into corporate bond purchases or Manulife life insurance. According to the records, many customers made savings deposits, but were misled by the bank's employees due to changes in their explanations. In 2023, they met with SCB's leaders many times but did not receive a clear answer about when they would be refunded. In January 2023, SCB stated that they only introduced the product, with the bond issuing company responsible for refunding. Customers responded by accusing SCB of being deliberately vague in their advice, and using high interest rates to lure them into switching to buying bonds.

In July 2023, the State Bank of Vietnam decided to apply special control measures to SCB. Subsequently, the bank continuously closed branches and transaction offices.

As of January 2024, police supposedly tried to find about 42,000 defrauded depositors who had not received interest or principal payments since the arrest of Lan in October 2022.

=== 2024 Trương Mỹ Lan trials ===
In March 2024, the judge presiding over the trial of Trương Mỹ Lan said that "SCB should have been placed under special control by the government in 2018", but because of a bribed report by an inspector at the State Bank of Vietnam "the decision was delayed until 2022. The former chairman of the bank, Bui Anh Dung was accused of approving 404 loans to Truong My Lan between 2013 and 2022, which cost the bank US$8.62 billion. Lan was sentenced to death in April 2024; her appeal against the sentence was rejected in December 2024. Under Vietnamese law her sentence may be commuted to life imprisonment if she returns three-quarters of the approximately US$12 billion she was convicted of embezzling (it was reported that actual damage may have been $27b).

In October 2024 Lan was also convicted of money laundering, and sentenced to life imprisonment.

== See also ==
- List of banks in Vietnam
- Corruption in Vietnam
