= Michael Tatarski =

American journalist

- Born: March 4, 1988 (age 38); New Orleans, Louisiana, U.S.
- Occupation: Journalist

Michael Tatarski is an American journalist based in Vietnam. Tatarski is the writer of Vietnam Weekly, and served as Editor-in-Chief of Saigoneer, a Ho Chi Minh City-based English news publication, from 2018 to 2022. Tatarski's reporting has covered Vietnamese culture, politics, and international relations, including the 2019 Trump-Kim Summit in Hanoi and the COVID-19 outbreak in Vietnam. He extensively covered Ho Chi Minh City's sidewalk clearing campaign, launched in 2018, and US-Vietnam relations.

Tatarski has reported on conservation efforts and climate change in Vietnam, particularly on the country's wildlife trafficking trade and the imprisonment of environmental activists. His reporting has appeared in The Atlantic, The Washington Post, Vice, The Diplomat, and The Telegraph.

== Personal life ==
Tatarski grew up in New Orleans, and attended the University of Pittsburgh, graduating in 2006 with a degree in political science and history.
