= Tan Hiep Phat Beverage Group =

Tân Hiệp Phát Beverage Group
- Industry: Beverages
- Predecessor: Bến Thành Brewery and Beverage factory
- Founded: 1994 in Vietnam
- Founder: Trần Quí Thanh
- Headquarters: Vietnam
- Products: Tea; Energy drinks
- Website: www.thp.com.vn/en/

Tân Hiệp Phát Beverage Group (Vietnamese: Tập đoàn Nước giải khát Tân Hiệp Phát) is a Vietnamese drink producer. The company was founded by Trần Quí Thanh in 1994. It is the largest privately owned soft drink provider in Vietnam, and produces over a billion litres a year.

The company operates in Vietnam and 16 additional countries including Australia and China.

== History ==
Trần Quí Thanh set up the company in 1994, the year that the United States ended its trade embargo with Vietnam.

Trần started as a beer company, and was known as Bến Thành Brewery and Beverage factory. Trần bought an old production line from Saigon Beer and fixed up the factory. He moved his family into the building, and raised his children on the premises.

The company then changed to bottled teas and later expanded to energy drinks as well, beginning sales of their green tea in 2006 and herbal tea in 2009.

In 2011 Coca-Cola offered to buy the company, valuing it at $2.5 billion. The company ultimately turned down the offer, as Coca-Cola did not want the company to expand outside Vietnam which was counter to Trần's intentions.

== 2015 lawsuit ==
In 2015 a customer claimed he had found a fly inside one of their bottles. The case led to Tân Hiệp Phát receiving harsh criticism in the media. However, the company eventually won the case in court, which found the consumer's claims to be false.

Trần has said that the incident damaged the company's public image, and that in order to repair his image he began offering public visits to the company's factory in order to restore faith in their products.
