= State Bank of Vietnam =

Central Bank of Vietnam

Coordinates: 21.0274°N 105.8563°E

State Bank of Vietnam Ngân hàng Nhà nước Việt Nam

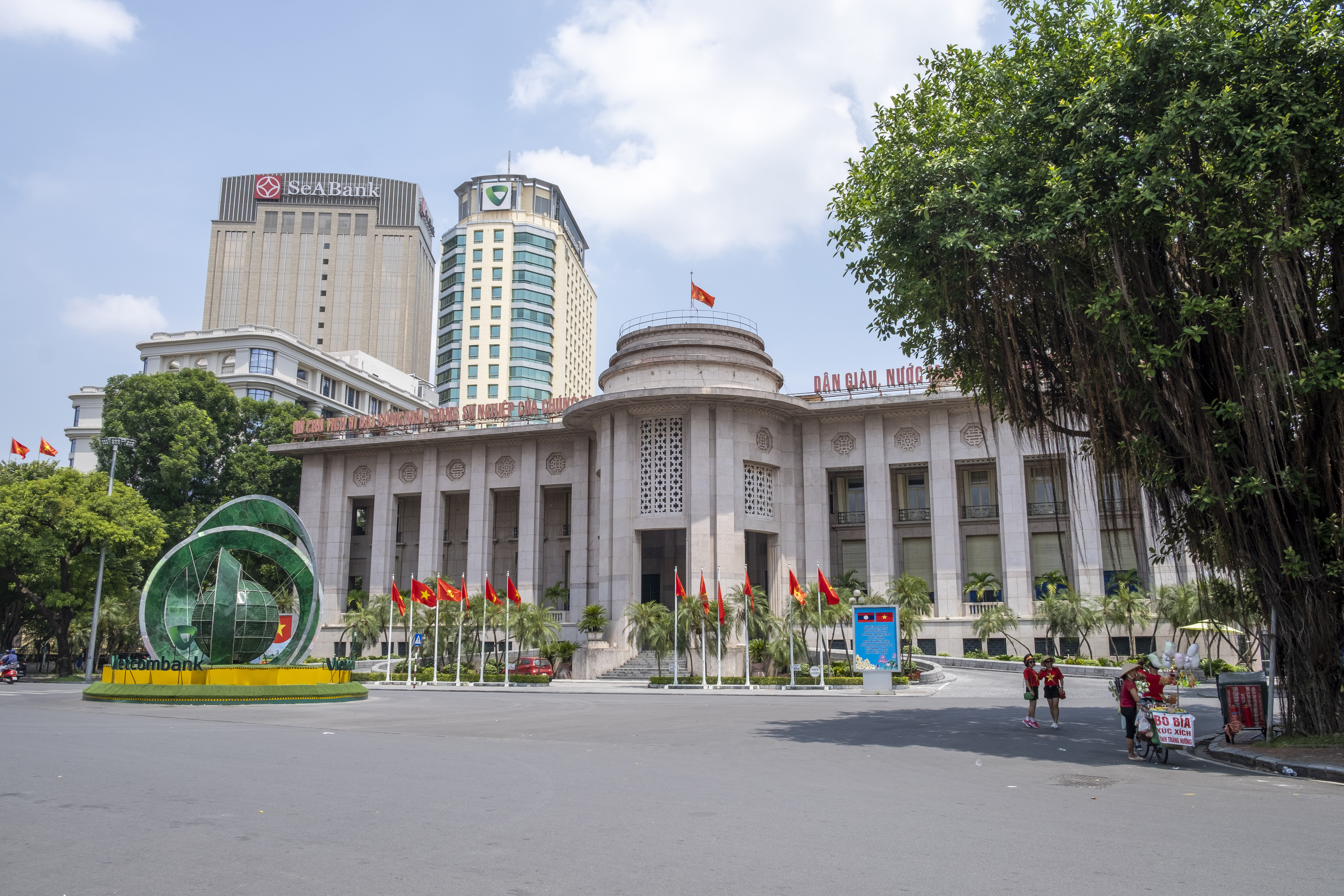
- SBV headquarters
- Central bank of: Socialist Republic of Vietnam (since 1976) Democratic Republic of Vietnam (1951–1975)
- Headquarters: 49 Lý Thái Tổ Street, Hoàn Kiếm, Hanoi
- Established: 6 May 1951; 75 years ago
- Ownership: Government of Vietnam; 100% state ownership
- Governor: Phạm Đức Ấn
- Key people: Đoàn Thái Sơn, Phạm Tiến Dũng, Phạm Thanh Hà, Phạm Quang Dũng, Nguyễn Ngọc Cảnh
- Currency: Vietnamese đồng VND (ISO 4217)
- Reserves: 100+ billion USD
- Bank rate: 4.5%
- Preceded by: (North Vietnam) (South Vietnam) National Bank of Vietnam
- Website: www.sbv.gov.vn

The State Bank of Vietnam (SBV; Vietnamese: Ngân hàng Nhà nước Việt Nam) is the central bank of Vietnam. Organized as a ministry-level body under the Government of Vietnam, it is the sole issuer of the national currency, the Vietnamese đồng. As of 2024 it holds over US$100 billion in foreign exchange reserves.

== History ==
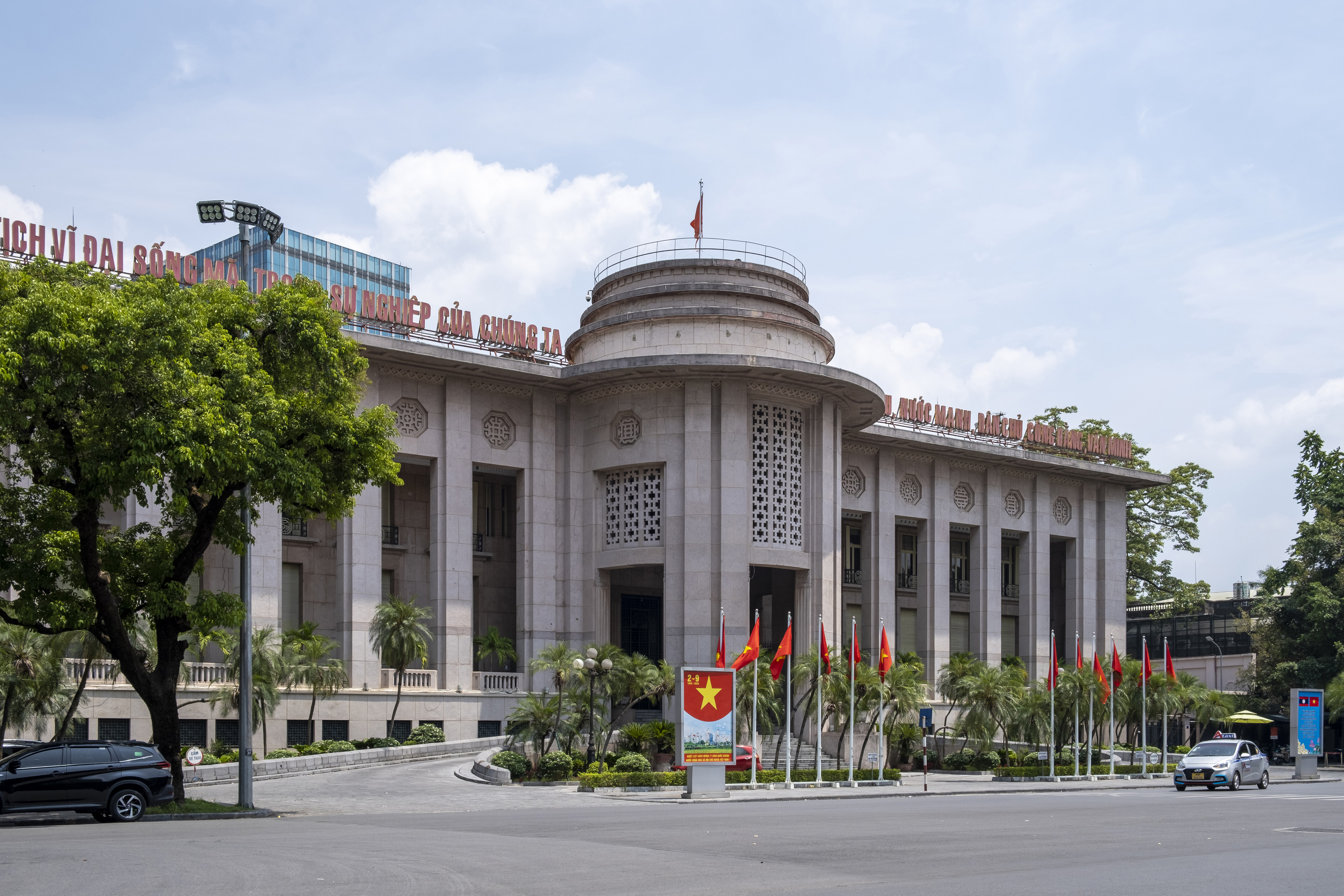
State Bank of Vietnam headquarters in Hanoi with French art-deco architecture

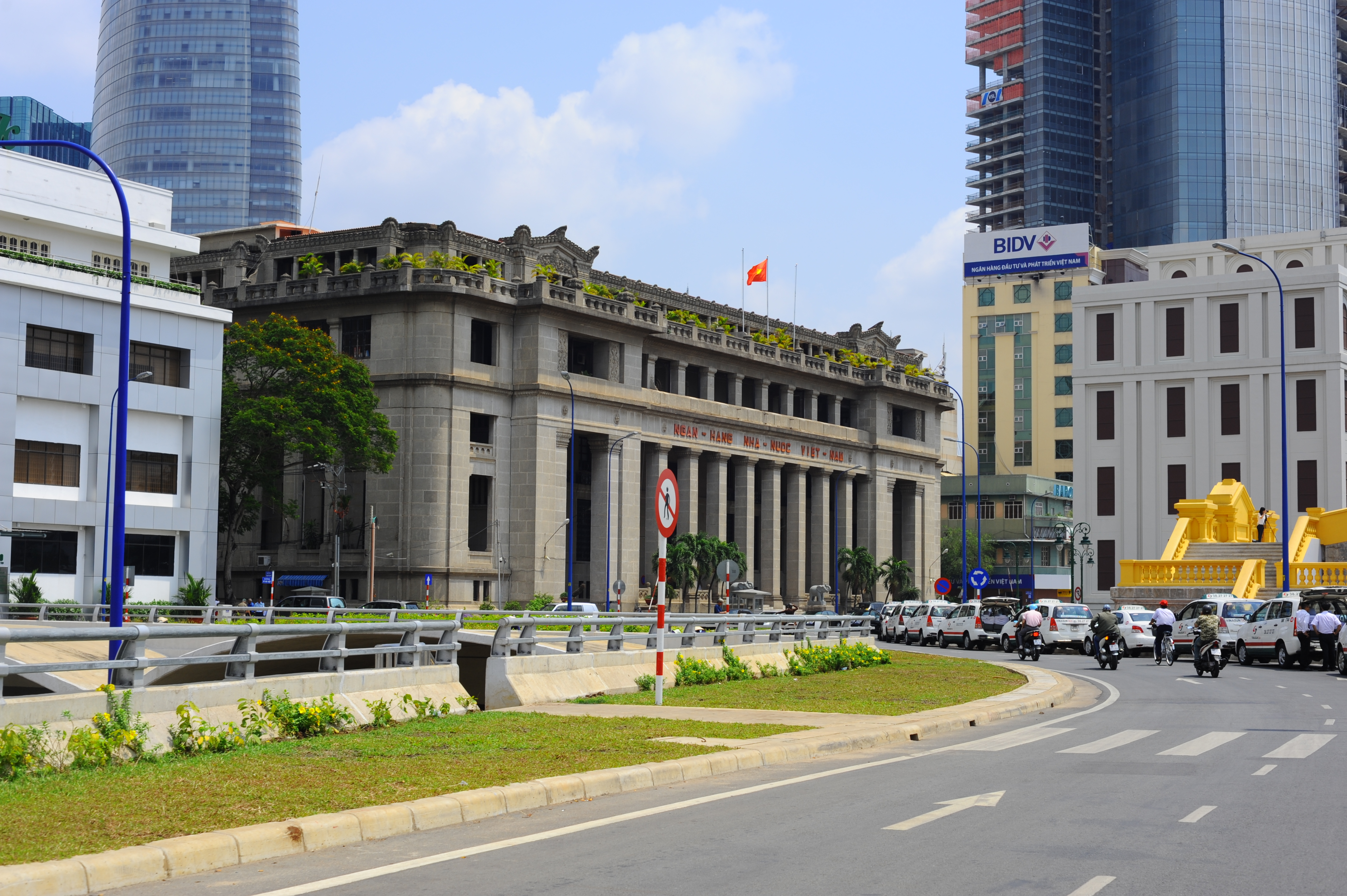
State Bank branch in Ho Chi Minh City.

When Indochina was under French rule, the colonial government governed the Indochinese monetary system through Banque de l'Indochine, which also acted as a commercial bank in French Indochina.

After the August Revolution in 1945, the government of the Democratic Republic of Vietnam gradually attempted to exercise a monetary system independent from France. On 6 May 1951, president Hồ Chí Minh signed decree 15/SL on establishment of Vietnam National Bank (Ngân hàng Quốc gia Việt Nam). On 21 January 1960, the governor of the bank signed an ordinance on behalf of the prime minister to rename the bank State Bank of Vietnam (Ngân hàng Nhà nước Việt Nam).

After the fall of Saigon, the two Vietnams were united but not until July 1976 did the two countries’ administrations and institutions unite. In July 1976, the National Bank of Vietnam (the central bank of Republic of Vietnam) was merged into the State Bank of Vietnam.

In the Đổi Mới liberalisation era, the banking system of Vietnam was reformed. New banks were created, starting with the Industrial and Commercial Bank of Vietnam (VietinBank – now the largest listed bank) and the Vietnam Bank for Agriculture in 1988, and the role of the State Bank was gradually narrowed to that of a central bank. In 1990, an ordinance reorganised the state bank and redefined its function as: "on behalf of the State, of managing money, credit, and banking operations throughout the country in order to stabilize a value of money, and is the only agency with power to circulate the currency of the Socialist Republic of Vietnam" While the State Bank continued to lend to state-owned enterprises in the following years, it has now been largely superseded in the respect by other state-owned banks and by private banks.

== Buildings ==
Several of the State Bank of Vietnam's buildings are inherited from the Banque de l'Indochine. These include the State Bank's headquarters in Hanoi, former Hanoi office completed in 1930; the Ho Chi Minh City branch, former central office in Indochina, also completed in 1930; and the branches in Haiphong (completed in 1925) and Nam Định (completed in 1929) among others.

== Functions and roles ==
The State Bank of Vietnam is a ministry-level body under the administration of the government; the bank governor is a member of the cabinet (equivalent to a minister in the cabinet). The governor is nominated by the prime minister subject to the approval of the National Assembly (Parliament). Vice governors are appointed by the prime minister on the recommendation of the governor. Both governor and vice governors serve a 5-year term. The State Bank of Vietnam defines its principal roles as :

1. Promote monetary stability and formulate monetary policies.
2. Promote institutions’ stability and supervise financial institutions.
3. Provide banking facilities and recommend economic policies to the government.
4. Provide banking facilities for financial institutions.
5. Manage the country's international reserves.
6. Print and issue banknotes.
7. Supervise all commercial banks’ activities in Vietnam. Lend the state money to the commercial banks.
8. Issue government bonds, organise bond auctions.
9. Be in charge of other roles in monetary management and foreign exchange rates

== List of Governors of the State Bank of Vietnam ==
#	Governor	Portrait	Took office	Left office	Notes
1	Nguyễn Lương Bằng (1904–1979)		3 May 1951	10 April 1952	Later served as Deputy Prime Minister of Vietnam from 1976 to 1979.
2	Lê Viết Lượng (1900–1985)		11 May 1952	27 January 1963	
3	Tạ Hoàng Cơ (1911–1996)		27 January 1963	28 December 1974	
4	Đặng Việt Châu (1914–1990)		28 December 1974	6 May 1976	
5	Hoàng Anh (1912–2016)		6 May 1976	28 February 1977	
6	Trần Dương (1922–2006)		28 February 1977	20 February 1981	
7	Nguyễn Duy Gia (1938–2025)		20 February 1981	21 June 1986	Youngest Governor; assumed office at 43 years old.
8	Lữ Minh Châu (1929–2016)		21 June 1986	26 April 1989	
9	Cao Sĩ Kiêm (born 1941)		26 April 1989	23 December 1997	Removed from office as Governor because he was not confirmed by the National Assembly when the Government re-nominated him.
–	Đỗ Quế Lượng (born 1939); Acting Governor		23 December 1997	6 May 1998	
10	Nguyễn Tấn Dũng (born 1949)		7 May 1998	11 December 1999	Concurrently served as Permanent Deputy Prime Minister of Vietnam from 1997 to 2006. Later served as Prime Minister of Vietnam from 2006 to 2016.
11	Lê Đức Thúy (born 1948)		11 December 1999	23 August 2007	
12	Nguyễn Văn Giàu (born 1957)		23 August 2007	3 August 2011	
13	Nguyễn Văn Bình (born 1961)		3 August 2011	8 April 2016	
14	Lê Minh Hưng (born 1970)		8 April 2016	12 November 2020	Currently serving as Prime Minister of Vietnam since 2026.
15	Nguyễn Thị Hồng (born 1968)		12 November 2020	6 April 2026	First female Governor.
16	Phạm Đức Ấn (born 1970)		8 April 2026	Incumbent	Current Governor.

== Controversies and corruption cases ==
The former prime minister, Nguyễn Tấn Dũng, was a governor of the bank while he held the post of senior deputy prime minister, but later bestowed the governor's post upon Lê Đức Thúy. In 2007, controversy surrounded the purchase of the state house by governor Lê Đức Thúy when he bought a house belonging to the bank at one tenth of the market value and, the government stopped the deal when the media reported the purchase. There has been criticism of the printing quality of the then new polymer đồng banknotes.

In 2024, a former State Bank of Vietnam official accused of accepting $5.2 million in bribes faced trial in conjunction with the 2022 arrest of Trương Mỹ Lan and the near failure of Sai Gon Joint Stock Commercial Bank.

== See also ==
- Corruption in Vietnam
- List of banks in Vietnam
- Economy of Vietnam
- List of central banks
