= Nguyễn Hồng Diên =

Vietnamese politician

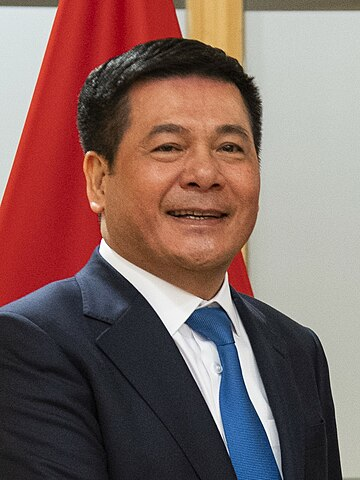
- Nguyễn Hồng Diên in 2023

Vice Chairman of the National Assembly of Vietnam
- Incumbent
- Assumed office April 6, 2026
- Chairman: Trần Thanh Mẫn

Minister of Industry and Trade
- In office April 8, 2021 – December 20, 2025
- Prime Minister: Phạm Minh Chính
- Preceded by: Trần Tuấn Anh
- Succeeded by: Lê Mạnh Hùng

Deputy Head of the Central Committee's Propaganda Department
- In office May 7, 2020 – April 12, 2021
- Head: Võ Văn Thưởng; Nguyễn Trọng Nghĩa
- Preceded by: Bùi Thế Đức
- Succeeded by: Phùng Xuân Nhạ

Chairman of the Thái Bình Provincial People's Council
- In office July 30, 2018 – August 10, 2020
- Preceded by: Đặng Trọng Thăng
- Succeeded by: Nguyễn Tiến Thành
- In office June 23, 2011 – April 27, 2015
- Preceded by: Nguyễn Xuân Trung
- Succeeded by: Trần Hồng Quân

Party Secretary of Thái Bình
- In office April 27, 2018 – May 7, 2020
- Preceded by: Phạm Văn Sinh
- Succeeded by: Ngô Đông Hải

Deputy Party Secretary of Thái Bình
- In office April 23, 2015 – April 27, 2018
- Secretary: Nguyễn Hạnh Phúc; Phạm Văn Sinh
- Preceded by: Lê Hồng Thịnh
- Succeeded by: Ngô Đông Hải

Captain in the Vietnam People's Navy
- In office September 4, 1985 – September 4, 2005

Personal details
- Born: March 16, 1965 (age 61) Hồng Minh, Hưng Hà, Thái Bình Province, North Vietnam
- Party: Communist Party of Vietnam

Nguyễn Hồng Diên (Vietnamese pronunciation: [ŋwiən˦ˀ˥ həwŋ͡m˨˩ ziən˧˧]; born March 16, 1965) is a Vietnamese politician who is serving as Vice Chairman of the National Assembly since 2026. He has been served as the Minister of Industry and Trade since April 8, 2021 until December 20, 2025. He is a member of the 14th Party Central Committee. He is also a member of the National Assembly, representing Thái Bình Province and Hải Phòng.

Prior to his current role, Diên served as the Deputy Head of the Central Committee's Propaganda Department from May 2020 to April 2021. He has held various positions within the government and the Communist Party of Vietnam, including Chairman of the Provincial People's Council of Thái Bình Province and Secretary of the Party Committee of Thái Bình Province.

== Early life and education ==
Nguyễn Hồng Diên was born on March 16, 1965, in Hồng Minh, Hưng Hà District, Thái Bình Province, Vietnam. He joined the Vietnam People's Navy in 1985 and served as a captain until 2005. He holds a bachelor's degree in political theory and a master's degree in public administration.

== Political career ==
Nguyễn Hồng Diên began his political career in the Communist Party of Vietnam in the early 2000s. He held various positions within the party structure in Thái Bình Province before rising to higher offices at the provincial level. From 2011 to 2015, he served as the Chairman of the Provincial People's Council of Thái Bình Province.

In April 2015, Diên was appointed the Vice Secretary of the Party Committee of Thái Bình Province, serving in this position until April 2018. During this time, he also became a member of the 12th Central Committee of the Communist Party of Vietnam.

From April 2018 to May 2020, Nguyễn Hồng Diên served as the Secretary of the Party Committee of Thái Bình Province. In this capacity, he was responsible for leading the party organization in the province and implementing the party's policies and directives.

In May 2020, Diên was appointed the Deputy Head of the Central Committee's Propaganda Department. He held this position until April 2021 when he was appointed the Minister of Industry and Trade.

== Minister of Industry and Trade ==
As the Minister of Industry and Trade, Nguyễn Hồng Diên has been involved in shaping Vietnam's trade policies and promoting economic development. He has emphasized the importance of increasing exports, diversifying markets, and reducing reliance on imports. Under his leadership, the Ministry of Industry and Trade has worked to enhance Vietnam's competitiveness in the global market and attract foreign investment.

Diên has also focused on addressing challenges related to trade barriers, market access, and the development of key industries such as manufacturing, energy, and agriculture. He has advocated for reforms to improve the business environment and facilitate trade, including efforts to streamline regulations, reduce bureaucracy, and enhance transparency.

== Personal life ==
Nguyễn Hồng Diên is married and has children. He is known for his disciplined work ethic and commitment to the principles of the Communist Party of Vietnam. In addition to his political activities, he is involved in various social and community organizations.
