= National Assembly of Vietnam =

Unicameral legislature of Vietnam

National Assembly of Vietnam Quốc hội Việt Nam
- 16th National Assembly
- State emblem

- Logo

Type
- Type: Unicameral
- Established: 2 March 1946; 80 years ago (DRV) 2 July 1976; 50 years ago (current form)

Leadership
- Chairman: Trần Thanh Mẫn, CPV since 20 May 2024
- Permanent Vice Chairman: Đỗ Văn Chiến, CPV since 10 November 2025
- Vice Chairman: Nguyễn Khắc Định, CPV since 1 April 2024
- Nguyễn Thị Thanh, CPV since 6 June 2024
- Nguyễn Doãn Anh, CPV since 6 April 2026
- Nguyễn Hồng Diên, CPV since 6 April 2026
- Nguyễn Thị Hồng, CPV since 6 April 2026
- Secretary-General: Lê Quang Mạnh, CPV since 29 September 2025

Structure
- Seats: 500
- Political groups: Vietnamese Fatherland Front (500): CPV (482); Independent (18)
- Length of term: 5 years

Elections
- Voting system: Plurality block voting
- First election: 6 January 1946
- Last election: 15 March 2026
- Next election: 2031

Meeting place
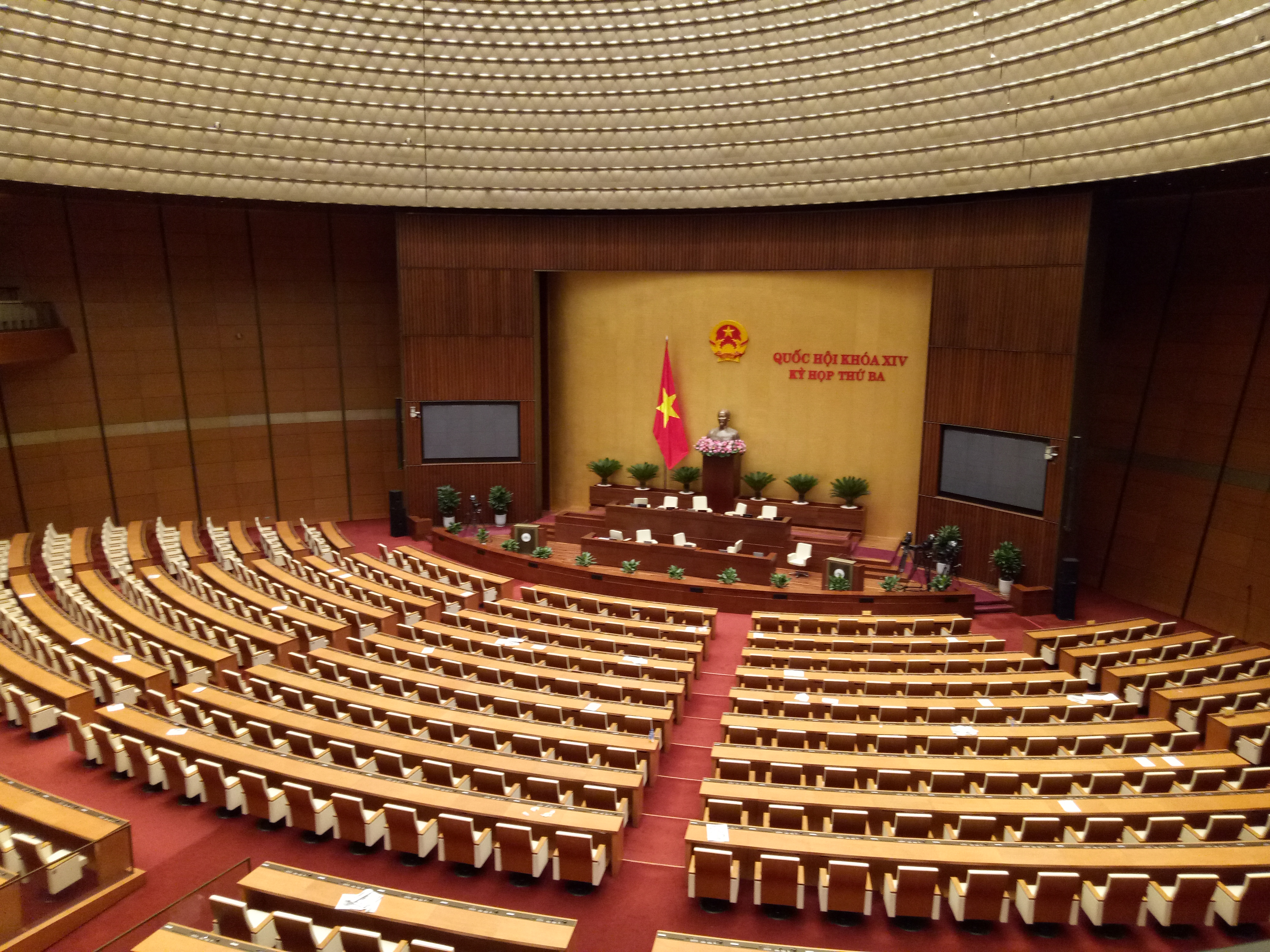

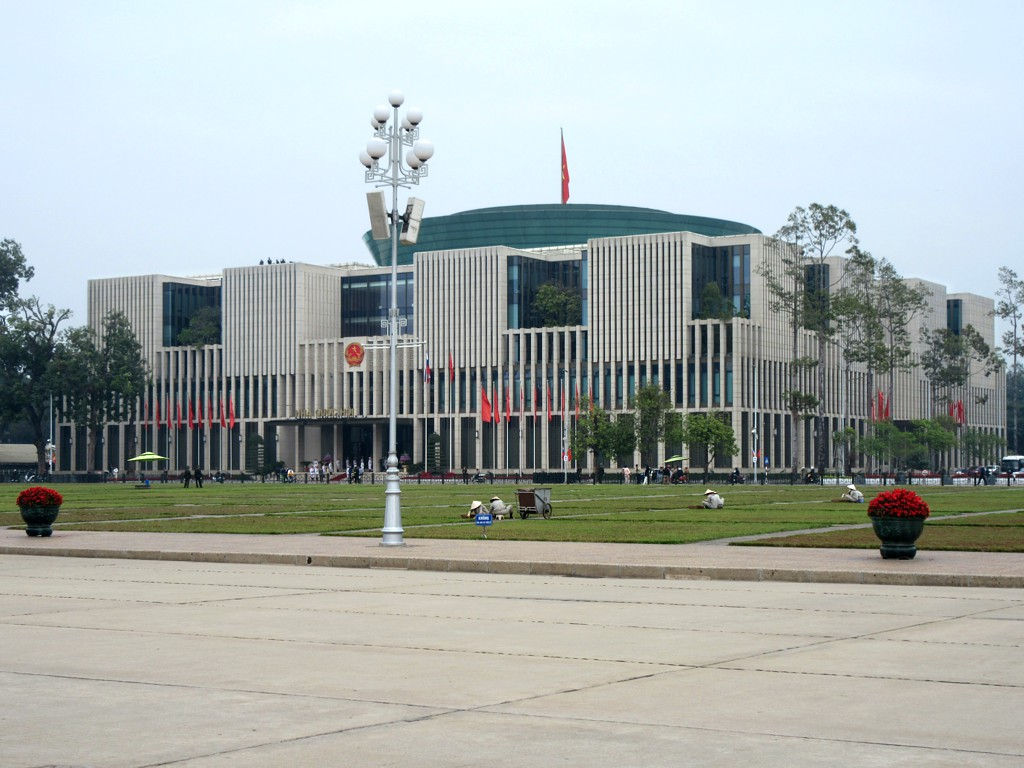
- Diên Hồng Hall of the National Assembly House, Hanoi

Website
- (in English) quochoi.vn

Rules
- Law on organization of the National Assembly (48/VBHN-VPQH)

The National Assembly of the Socialist Republic of Vietnam (N.A.; Vietnamese: Quốc hội nước Cộng hoà xã hội chủ nghĩa Việt Nam) is the unicameral supreme state organ of power of Vietnam. It is the only branch of government in Vietnam and, in accordance with the principle of unified power, all state organs are subservient to it.

The assembly is a 500-delegate unicameral body elected to a five-year term. It normally sits twice a year, or more frequently if called for by the National Assembly Standing Committee. It appoints the president (head of state), the prime minister (head of government), the chief justice of the Supreme People's Court of Vietnam, the head of the Supreme People's Procuracy of Vietnam, and the 21-member cabinet.

Constitutionally, the assembly is the highest government organization and the highest-level representative body of the people. It has the power to draw up, adopt, and amend the constitution and to make and amend laws. The assembly also has the responsibility to legislate and implement state plans and budgets. Through its constitution-making powers it defines its own role and the roles of the Vietnamese State President, the Vietnamese Government, the local people's councils and people's committees, the Supreme People's Court, and the Supreme People's Procuracy. The assembly can replace and remove government ministers, the chief justice of the Supreme People's Court, and the procurator general of the Supreme People's Procuracy. Finally, it has the de jure power to initiate or conclude wars and to assume other duties and powers it deems necessary.

In practice, like its counterparts in other communist states, the assembly has been characterized as a rubber stamp body of the Communist Party of Vietnam (CPV) or only being able to affect issues of low sensitivity to the regime. The CPV controls nomination and election processes at every level. It has influence over the executive and exercises control through the 150-member Central Committee, which elects the 19-member Politburo at national party congresses held every five years. All senior government positions are held by members of the party. While vested with great lawmaking and oversight powers on paper, in practice the assembly does little more than ratify decisions already made by the CPV and its Politburo, occasionally opposing the party, such as its rejection of a high-speed rail line between Hanoi and Ho Chi Minh City in 2010.

== History ==
The predecessor of the Republic of Vietnam was the State of Vietnam (1949–55), which had no parliament but only a National Advisory Council of 45 people appointed by the Chief of State. Due to war conditions, the state could not hold parliamentary elections but could only hold municipal elections in January 1953.

The Twelfth National Assembly (2007–2011) consisted of 493 elected deputies. In this term, Nguyễn Phú Trọng was elected as the 10th Chairman of the National Assembly.

== Structure and organization ==
- Standing Committee (Ủy ban Thường vụ): This is the standing and executive body of the National Assembly, including the Chairman/Chairwoman, Deputy Chairmen/Chairwomen, and other standing members. The number of the Standing Committee's members is decided by the National Assembly, these members must not concurrently hold a position in the cabinet. The Standing Committee of previous term shall continue their duties until the newly elected National Assembly establishes its new Standing Committee.
  - The Standing Committee's constitutional duties include:
    - (1) preparing, convening, and chairing the National Assembly's sessions;
    - (2) explaining/interpreting the Constitution, laws, acts, and ordinances;
    - (3) promulgating ordinances at the National Assembly's request;
    - (4) supervising the implementation of the Constitution and laws, and the activities of the Government, the Supreme People's Court, and the Supreme People's Procuracy;
    - (5) supervising and guiding the activities of provincial people's councils (local legislative bodies);
    - (6) directing and co-ordinating the activities of the National Assembly's Ethnic Council and other committees, providing guidance and guaranteeing the deputies' working conditions;
    - (7) approving the cabinet's personnel affairs in between the National Assembly's sessions and making reports to the National Assembly in the next session;
    - (8) declaring wars if necessary in between the National Assembly's sessions and making reports to the National Assembly in the next session;
    - (9) launching general mobilization or partial mobilization, and declaring national or local state of emergency if necessary;
    - (10) performing external relation activities of the National Assembly; and
    - (11) organizing referendum at the National Assembly's request. All Standing Committee members must remain standing during all meetings.
  - Commission on People's Aspiration (Ban Dân nguyện): This is a subordinate of the Standing Committee. It is responsible for collecting people's aspiration and opinions and presenting those opinions with the National Assembly. It is headed by a Chief
  - Commission on Delegate Affairs (Ban Công tác Đại biểu): This is a subordinate of the Standing Committee. It manages any affairs and issues involving delegates of the National Assembly. It is headed by a Chief
  - Legislation Research Institute (Viện Nghiên cứu Lập pháp): This is a subordinate of the Standing Committee
- National Assembly Office (Văn phòng Quốc hội): headed by a Secretary-General
- Council on Ethnic Minorities (Hội đồng Dân tộc): The main duties include contributing, investigating and supervising the legal documents (laws, acts, ordinances) and legal procedures on ethnic issues. It is headed by a Chairperson
- Committee on Laws (Ủy ban Pháp luật), headed by a Chairperson
- Committee on Justice (Ủy ban Tư pháp), headed by a Chairperson
- Committee on Economy (Ủy ban Kinh tế), headed by a Chairperson
- Committee on Finance – Budget (Ủy ban Tài chính – Ngân sách), headed by a Chairperson
- Committee on Defense and Security (Ủy ban Quốc phòng và An ninh), headed by a Chairperson
- Committee on Culture, Education, Youths, Teenagers and Children (Ủy ban Văn hóa, Giáo dục, Thanh niên, Thiếu niên và Nhi đồng), headed by a Chairperson
- Committee on Social Affairs (Ủy ban Các Vấn đề Xã hội), headed by a Chairperson
- Committee on Science, Technology and Environment (Ủy ban Khoa học, Công nghệ và Môi trường), headed by a Chairperson
- Committee on External Relations (Ủy ban Đối ngoại), headed by a Chairperson

Other agencies that are elected by the National Assembly, and function independently, are:

- National Election Council (Hội đồng Bầu cử Quốc gia), headed by a Chairperson
- State Audit Office (Kiểm toán Nhà nước), headed by a Chief State Auditor

== See also ==
- Chairman of the National Assembly of Vietnam
