= Politics of Vietnam =

The politics of Vietnam operates under a one-party system, led by the Communist Party of Vietnam (CPV), under a communist state system. The President of Vietnam (Vietnamese: Chủ tịch nước) is the nominal head of state, and the Prime Minister of Vietnam is the head of government. Both of these offices are often separate from the General Secretary of the Communist Party of Vietnam, who leads the CPV and is head of the Politburo and the Central Military Commission. The General Secretary is the highest position in Vietnamese politics.

The Vietnamese constitution and legislation provides for regular elections for the office of the President of the Socialist Republic, the National Assembly and the People's Councils. Elections in Vietnam are conducted under a single-party authoritarian system led by the Communist Party of Vietnam. Elections are constrained by the Communist Party's dominant role on power in Vietnam, limitations on free speech, and government interference with the elections.

The National Assembly is a unicameral legislative body, although many scholars argue it has asserted more authority in recent decades. It consists of 500 members, indirectly elected by popular vote to serve four-year terms. Through this legislature, the party enacts and amends the constitution and laws, such as the current Constitution of Vietnam. This document, the country's fifth, was adopted on 28 November 2013 and amended in 2025. The assembly also adopts the government budget, supervises the government of Vietnam and other public officials, and appoints members of the judiciary.

Public officials supervised by the National Assembly include those holding executive power. The government (Chính phủ), the main executive state power of Vietnam, is headed by the Prime Minister, who has several Deputy Prime Ministers and ministers in charge of particular ministries that implement political, economic, cultural, and social public policies. The executive branch is also responsible for national defence, security and external activities of the state through a President elected by National Assembly for a five-year term. They act as the de jure commander-in-chief of the Vietnam People's Armed Forces and Chairman of the National Defense and Security Council because the de facto commander-in-chief is the Secretary of the Central Military Commission of the Communist Party of Vietnam.

Vietnam has a judicial system whose members are appointed by the CPV-controlled National Assembly. The Supreme People's Court (Tòa án Nhân dân Tối cao) is the highest court of appeal in Vietnam. There are other specialised courts in Vietnam, including the Central Military Court, the Criminal Court, the Civil Court, the Appeal Court, and the Supreme People's Procuracy.

== Framework ==
=== Legal framework ===
The Constitution of the Socialist Republic of Vietnam (Vietnamese: Hiến pháp nước Cộng hòa xã hội chủ nghĩa Việt Nam) is the communist state constitution of Vietnam. It functions as the fundamental and supreme law of the state. The current constitution, commonly known as the 2013 Constitution (Hiến pháp năm 2013), was adopted on November 28, 2013, by the 13th National Assembly of Vietnam and took effect on January 1, 2014, being the third constitution adopted by the Vietnamese state since the political reunification of the country in 1976. It was amended in 2025.

=== State ideology ===
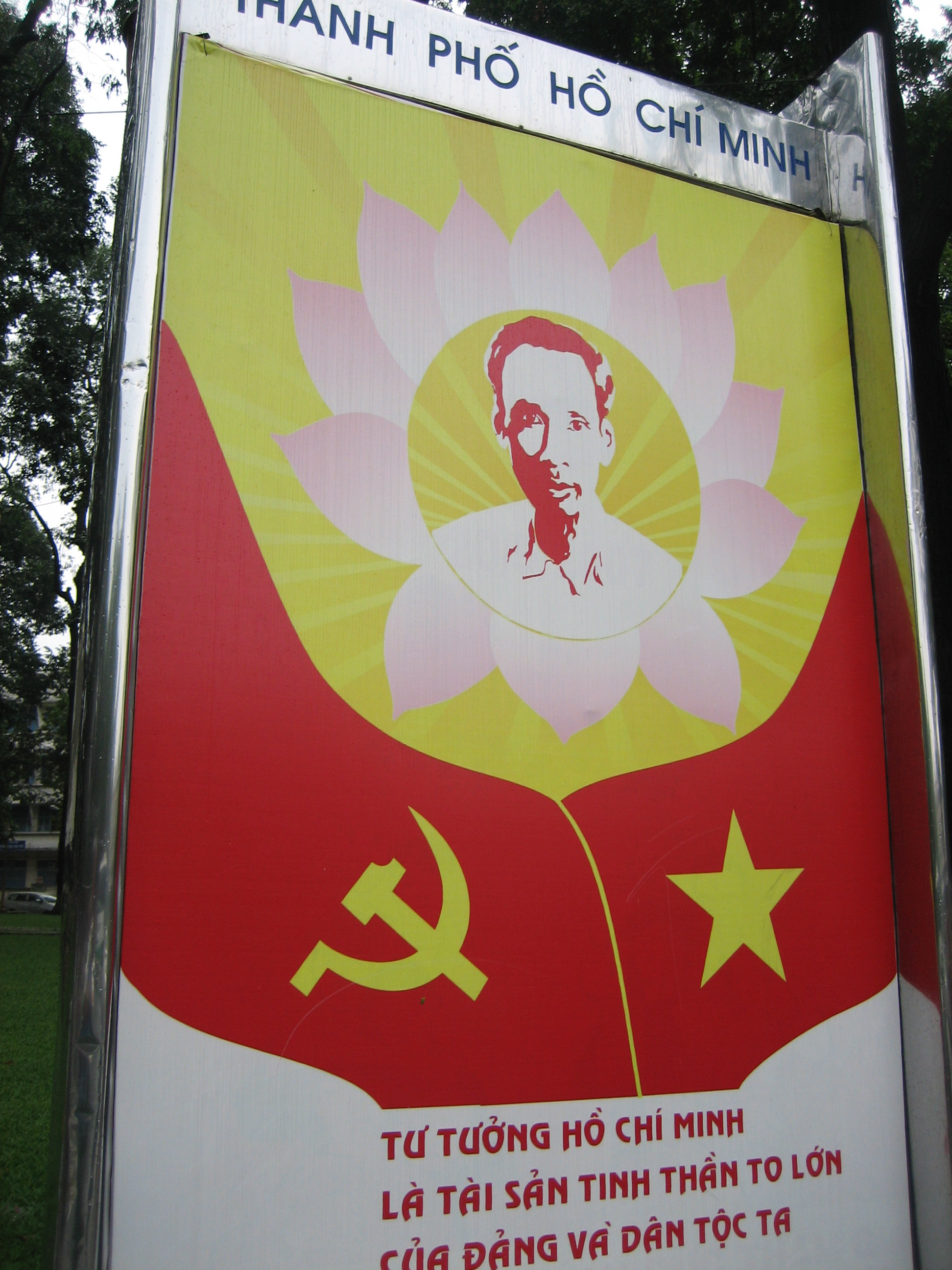
A propopaganda poster promoting Communism and Ho Chi Minh Thought in 2007.

Vietnam is a socialist republic with a one-party system led by the Communist Party of Vietnam (CPV). According to Pierre Brocheux, the author of Ho Chi Minh: a Biography, the state ideology is Hồ Chí Minh Thought, with Marxism–Leninism playing a secondary role.

The thoughts of Hồ Chí Minh were not systematised until 1989, under the leadership of Nguyễn Văn Linh. Hồ Chí Minh Thought, alongside Marxism–Leninism, became the official ideology of the CPV and the state in 1991. The CPV's claim to legitimacy was retained following the collapse of communism in 1989 and the dissolution of the Soviet Union in 1991 through its commitment to the thoughts of Hồ Chí Minh, according to Sophie Quinn-Judge. Some scholars argue that the party leadership has ceased believing in communism and uses Hồ Chí Minh Thought as a veil. However, other scholars disagree, noting that Hồ Chí Minh was an avid supporter of the dictatorship of the proletariat. Others view Hồ Chí Minh Thought as a political umbrella term that primarily serves to smuggle in non-socialist ideas and policies without challenging socialist legality.

Since the introduction of a mixed economy in the 1980s and 1990s, Marxism–Leninism has lost its monopolistic ideological and moral legitimacy. The Đổi Mới reforms demonstrate that the Party could not base its rule on defending only the workers and the peasants (officially: the "working class-peasant alliance"). In the constitution introduced in 1992, the State represented the "workers, peasants and intellectuals". The Party has thus stopped representing a specific class in favour of the "interests of the entire people", which includes entrepreneurs. The final class barrier was removed in 2002, when party members were allowed to engage in private activities. In the face of de-emphasising the role of Marxism–Leninism, the Party has acquired a broader ideology, placing more emphasis on nationalism, developmentalism, and becoming the protector of tradition.

== Institutions ==
=== Communist Party of Vietnam ===
The flag of the Communist Party of Vietnam

The communist state which emerged in the 20th century has been described either as totalitarian or not totalitarian but autocratic; the system established after the 1986 reforms has inherited some legacies of the past, with the freedom of assembly, association, expression, press and religion as well as civil society activism being restricted.

In 2021, General Secretary of the Communist Party, Nguyen Phu Trong, was re-elected for his third term in office. In July 2024, General Secretary Nguyễn Phú Trọng died and was succeeded by Tô Lâm. In January 2026, Tô Lâm was re-elected as general secretary of the Vietnam's Communist Party for the next five years by the party congress.

==== Congress ====
The National Congress is the party's highest organ. The direction of the Party and the Government is decided at the National Congress, held every fifth year. The Central Committee is elected by the National Congress. Delegates vote on policies and candidate posts within the central party leadership. Following ratification of the decisions taken at the National Congress, the National Congress dissolves itself. The Central Committee, which is elected by the National Congress every fifth year, implements the decisions of the National Congress in the five-year period. Since the Central Committee only meets twice a year, the Politburo implements the policies of the National Congress.

==== Central Committee ====
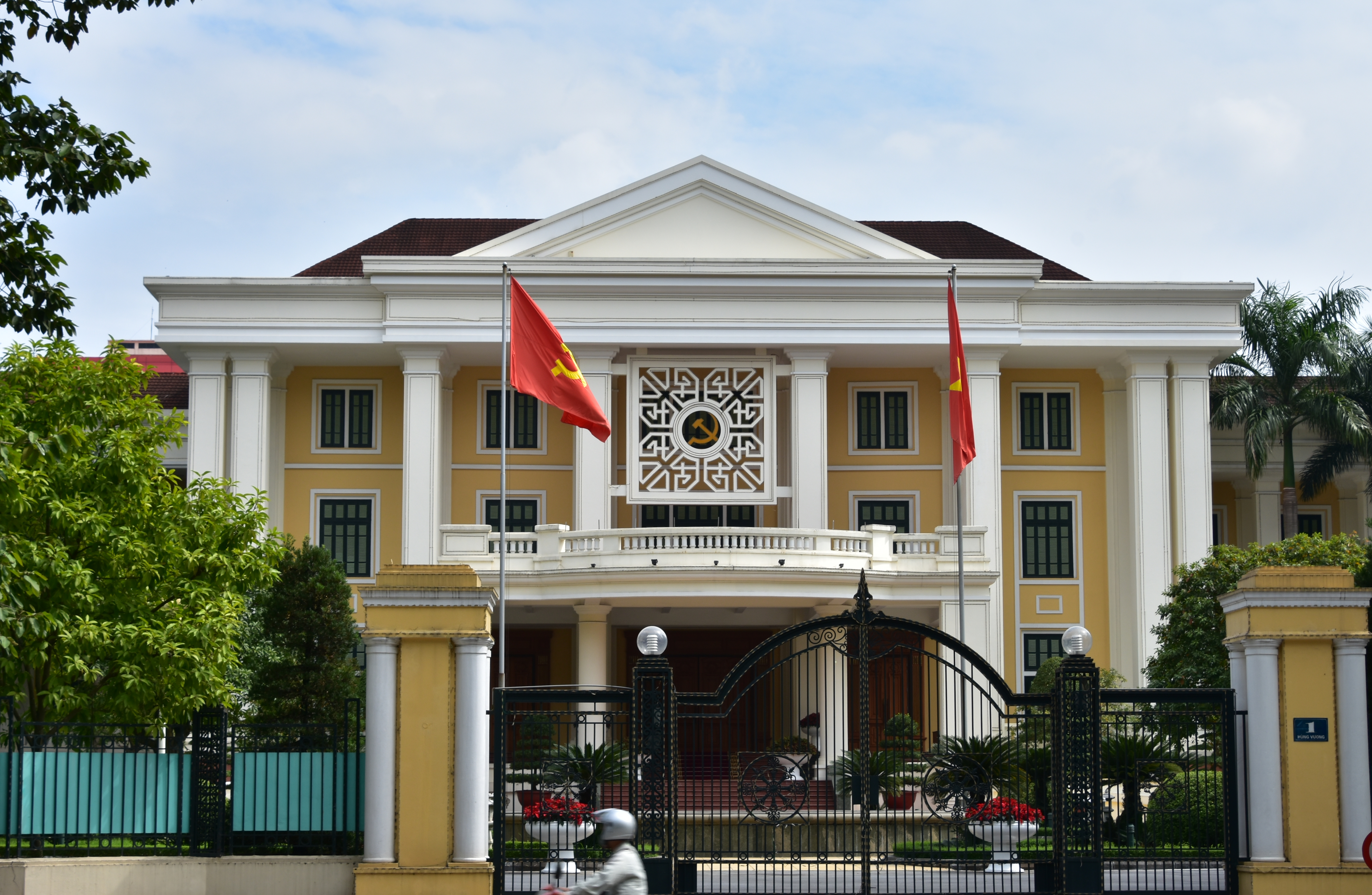
Headquarters of the Communist Party of Vietnam Central Committee

The Central Committee (CC) is the CPV's "most powerful institution". It delegates some of its powers to the Secretariat and the Politburo when it is not in session. When the Vietnam War ended in 1975, the Vietnamese leadership, led by Lê Duẩn, began to centralise power. This policy continued until the 6th National Congress, when Nguyễn Văn Linh took power. Linh pursued a policy of economic and political decentralisation. The party and state bureaucracy opposed Linh's reform initiatives; because of this, Linh tried to win the support of provincial leaders. This caused the powers of the provincial chapters of the CPV to increase in the 1990s. The CPV lost its power to appoint or dismiss provincial-level officials in the 1990s; this is proven by the fact that Võ Văn Kiệt tried to wrestle this power back to the centre during the 1990s without success. These developments led to the provincialisation of the Central Committee; for example, more and more CC members have a background in provincial party work. Because of these changes, power in Vietnam has become increasingly devolved. The number of Central Committee members with a provincial background increased from 15.6% in 1982 to 41% in 2000. Trương Tấn Sang, the President of Vietnam from 2011 to 2016, was directly elected from the provinces at the 8th Party Congress, held in 1996. Because of the devolution of power, the powers of the Central Committee have increased; for instance, when a two-thirds majority of the Politburo voted in favour of retaining Lê Khả Phiêu as General Secretary (the leader of Vietnam), the Central Committee voted against the Politburo's motion and voted unanimously in favour of removing Lê Khả Phiêu from his post of General Secretary. The Central Committee did this because the majority of its members were of provincial background, or were working in the provinces; because of this, these members were the first to feel the pinch when the economy began to stagnate during Lê Khả Phiêu's rule.

The Central Committee elects the Politburo in the aftermath of the Party Congress. Since the full Central Committee meets only once a year, the Politburo functions as the Party's leading collective decision-making body.

The current 19-member Politburo was elected on January 23, 2026, at the first plenum of the 14th Central Committee of the Communist Party of Vietnam following the respective 14th National Party Congress. The current ranking is nominated following the confirmation of the 16th Government.

Members of the 14th Politburo of the Communist Party of Vietnam
Rank	Name		In the 13th	Birth	PM	Birthplace	Education	Ethnicity	Gender	Ref.
1	Tô Lâm	Tô Lâm	Member	1957	1981	Hưng Yên	Postgraduate	Kinh	Male	
2		Lê Minh Hưng	Member	1970	2000	Hà Tĩnh	Graduate	Kinh	Male	
3		Trần Thanh Mẫn	Member	1962	1982	Cần Thơ	Postgraduate	Kinh	Male	
4		Trần Cẩm Tú	Member	1961	1990	Hà Tĩnh	Postgraduate	Kinh	Male	
5		Đỗ Văn Chiến	Member	1962	1986	Tuyên Quang	Postgraduate	Sán Dìu	Male	
6		Bùi Thị Minh Hoài	Member	1965	1991	Ninh Bình	Graduate	Kinh	Female	
7		Phan Văn Giang	Member	1960	1982	Ninh Bình	Postgraduate	Kinh	Male	
8		Lương Tam Quang	Member	1965	1998	Hưng Yên	Undergraduate	Kinh	Male	
9		Nguyễn Duy Ngọc	Member	1964	1986	Hưng Yên	Postgraduate	Kinh	Male	
10		Nguyễn Trọng Nghĩa	Member	1962	1982	Đồng Tháp	Undergraduate	Kinh	Male	
11		Trịnh Văn Quyết	Nonmember	1966	—	Hải Phòng	Undergraduate	Kinh	Male	
12		Lê Hoài Trung	Nonmember	1961	1986	Huế	Postgraduate	Kinh	Male	
13		Lê Minh Trí	Nonmember	1960	1984	Hồ Chí Minh	Undergraduate	Kinh	Male	
14		Trần Lưu Quang	Nonmember	1967	1997	Tây Ninh	Undergraduate	Kinh	Male	
15		Phạm Gia Túc	Nonmember	1965	1989	Ninh Bình	Graduate	Kinh	Male	
16		Trần Sỹ Thanh	Nonmember	1971	1995	Nghệ An	Graduate	Kinh	Male	
17		Nguyễn Thanh Nghị	Nonmember	1976	1999	Cà Mau	Graduate	Kinh	Male	
18		Đoàn Minh Huấn	Nonmember	1971	1995	Hà Tĩnh	Postgraduate	Kinh	Male	
19		Trần Đức Thắng	Nonmember	1973	2002	Phú Thọ	Postgraduate	Kinh	Male	

=== Fatherland Front ===
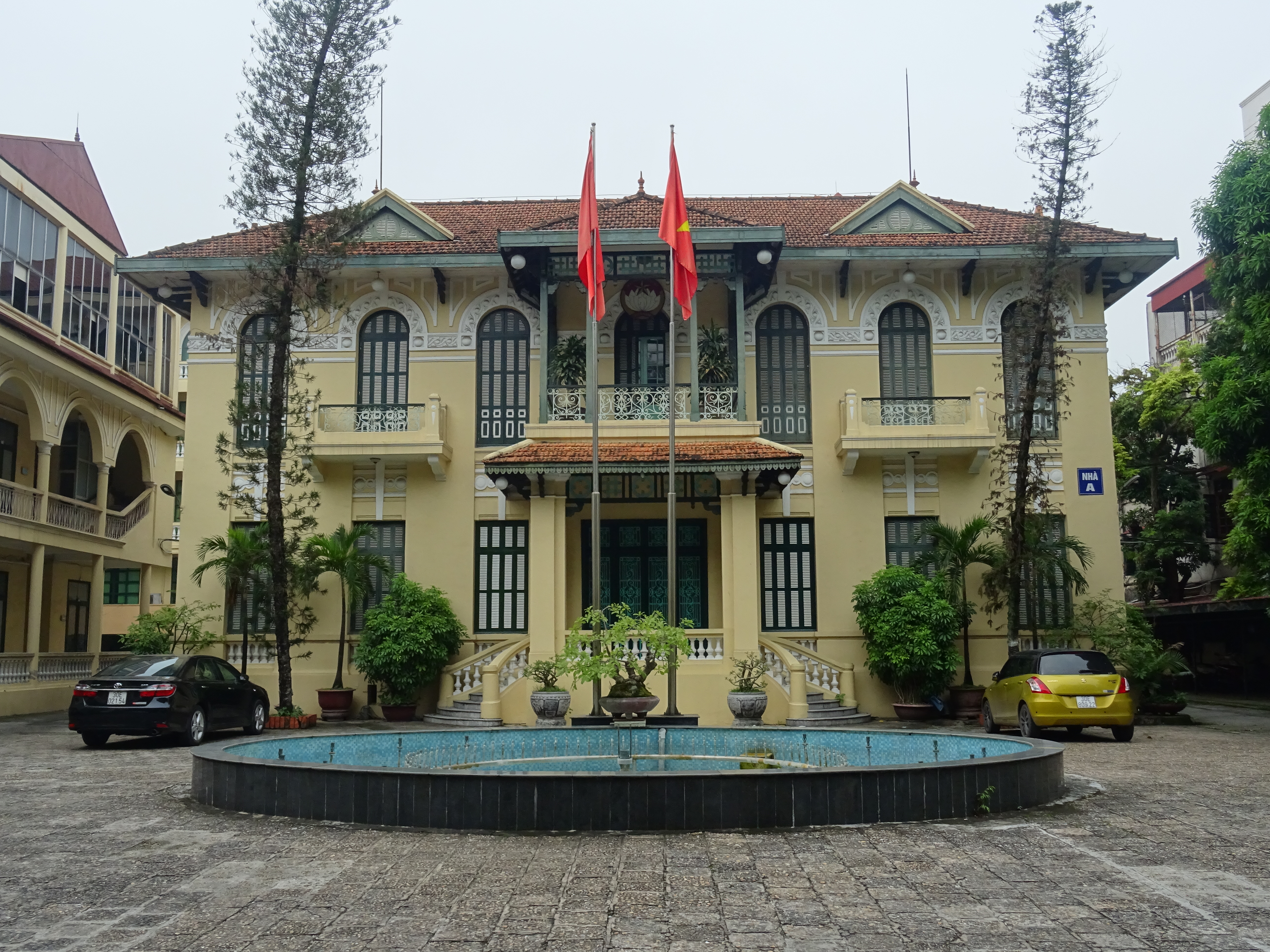
Headquarters of the Vietnam Fatherland Front

The Vietnam Fatherland Front (VFF) is an umbrella group of pro-communist movements. According to Article 9 of the Constitution, the VFF and its members constitute "the political base of people's power". The state must create a favorable environment for the VFF and its member organisations.

Main office-holders
Office	Name	Party	Since
Chairman of the Central Committee	Đỗ Văn Chiến	Communist Party	2021
Deputy Chairman of the Central Committee	Hầu A Lềnh	Communist Party	2017
General Secretary of the Central Committee	Hầu A Lềnh	Communist Party	2017

=== Elections ===
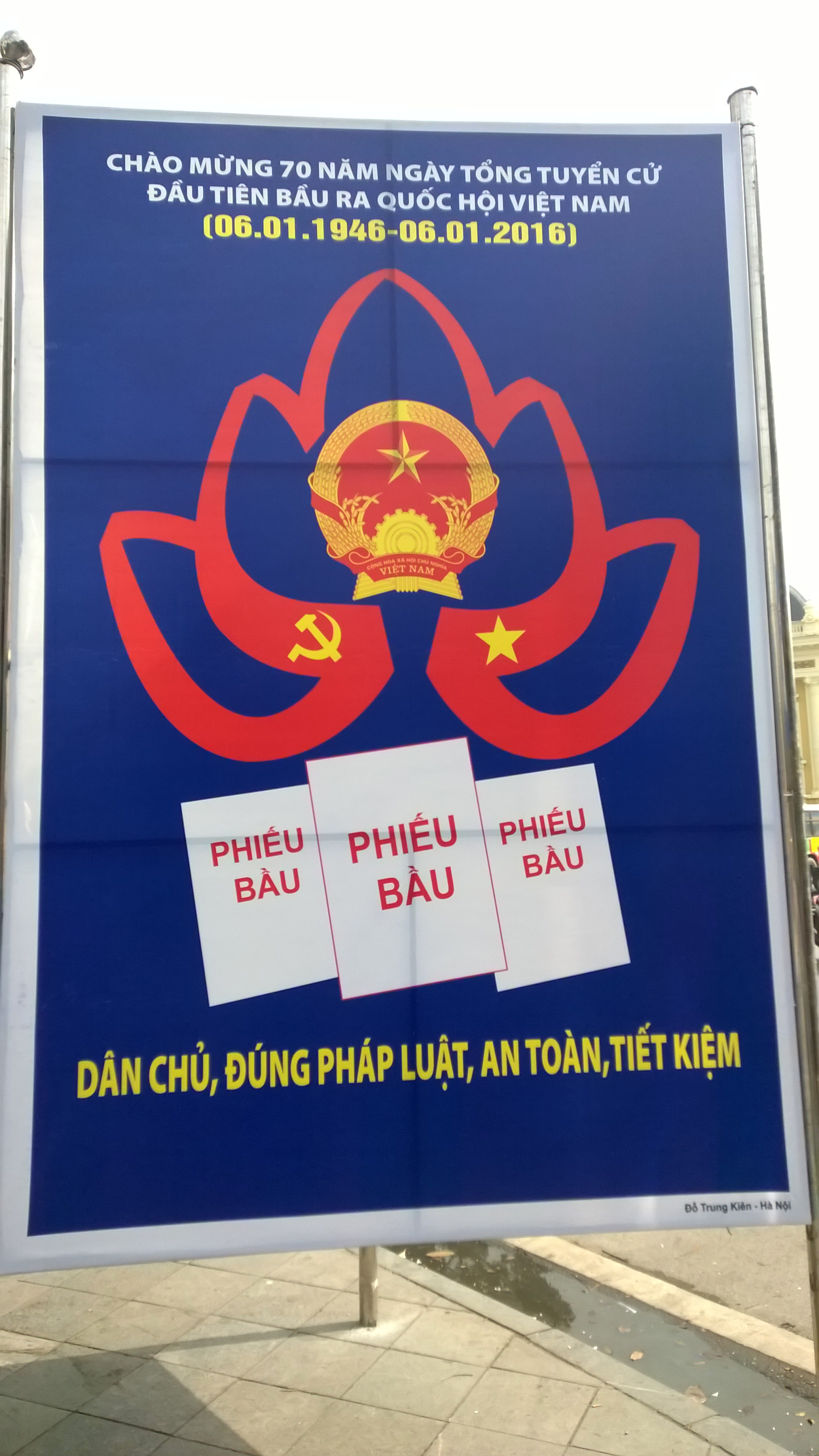
A billboard promoting the 2016 elections in Vietnam

The AFP reported in 2011 that though "even critics" believed that the National Assembly had grown "more vocal", the CVP retains control over elections. In that year's elections, 15 out of the 182 candidates nominated by the central government and the central party leadership were defeated in the elections. Lê Thị Thu Ba, a member of the Party's Central Committee and Chairman of the Committee of Law during the 12th National Assembly (2007–2011), was not re-elected to the National Assembly. Some capitalists were elected to the assembly and then barred from sitting on the assembly's Committee on Economy and Budget. State-sponsored media reported the elections as a success. Nguyễn Sinh Hùng, the Chairman of the National Assembly, nominated Trương Tấn Sang for the Presidency. VietnamPlus and Xinhua News Agency reported that 487 deputies of the National Assembly, or 97.4%, voted in favour of Trương Tấn Sang. According to the People's Daily, Trương Tấn Sang said in his victory speech, "I pledge to improve my moral quality and study the example of the late President Hồ Chí Minh to cooperate with the government to bring Vietnam to become a fully industrialized country by 2015".

== Structure of government ==
=== Executive ===
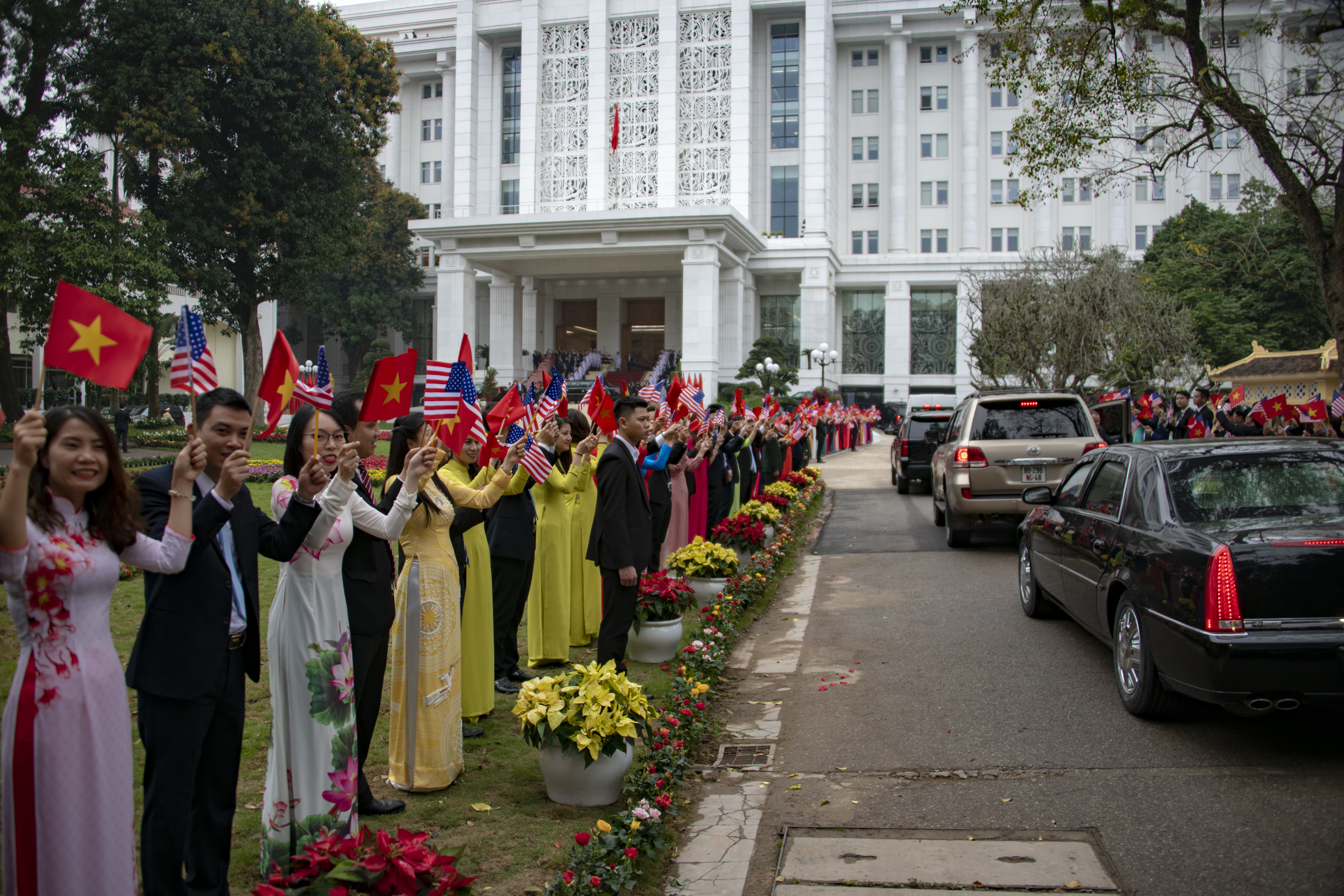
The Government Office as seen in 2019

The Prime Minister of the Government is the head of government and is elected or dismissed by the National Assembly, at the request of the president.

Main office-holders
Office	Name	Party	Since
President	Tô Lâm	Communist Party	2026
Vice President	Võ Thị Ánh Xuân	Communist Party	2021
Prime Minister	Lê Minh Hưng	Communist Party	2026
Senior Deputy Prime Minister	Phạm Gia Túc	Communist Party	2026
Deputy Prime Minister	Phan Văn Giang	Communist Party	2026
Deputy Prime Minister	Nguyễn Văn Thắng	Communist Party	2026
Deputy Prime Minister	Lê Tiến Châu	Communist Party	2026
Deputy Prime Minister	Phạm Thị Thanh Trà	Communist Party	2025
Deputy Prime Minister	Hồ Quốc Dũng	Communist Party	2025

=== Legislative ===
The National Assembly of the Socialist Republic of Vietnam (N.A.; Vietnamese: Quốc hội nước Cộng hoà xã hội chủ nghĩa Việt Nam) is the unicameral supreme state organ of power of Vietnam. It is the only branch of government in Vietnam and, in accordance with the principle of unified power, all state organs are subservient to it.

The assembly is a 500-delegate unicameral body elected to a five-year term. It normally sits twice a year, or more frequently if called for by the National Assembly Standing Committee. It appoints the president (head of state), the prime minister (head of government), the chief justice of the Supreme People's Court of Vietnam, the head of the Supreme People's Procuracy of Vietnam, and the 21-member cabinet.

Constitutionally, the assembly is the highest government organization and the highest-level representative body of the people. It has the power to draw up, adopt, and amend the constitution and to make and amend laws. The assembly also has the responsibility to legislate and implement state plans and budgets. Through its constitution-making powers it defines its own role and the roles of the Vietnamese State President, the Vietnamese Government, the local people's councils and people's committees, the Supreme People's Court, and the Supreme People's Procuracy. The assembly can replace and remove government ministers, the chief justice of the Supreme People's Court, and the procurator general of the Supreme People's Procuracy. Finally, it has the de jure power to initiate or conclude wars and to assume other duties and powers it deems necessary.

In practice, like its counterparts in other communist states, the assembly has been characterized as a rubber stamp body of the Communist Party of Vietnam (CPV) or only being able to affect issues of low sensitivity to the regime. The CPV controls nomination and election processes at every level. It has influence over the executive and exercises control through the 150-member Central Committee, which elects the 19-member Politburo at national party congresses held every five years. All senior government positions are held by members of the party. While vested with great lawmaking and oversight powers on paper, in practice the assembly does little more than ratify decisions already made by the CPV and its Politburo, occasionally opposing the party, such as its rejection of a high-speed rail line between Hanoi and Ho Chi Minh City in 2010.

=== Judiciary ===
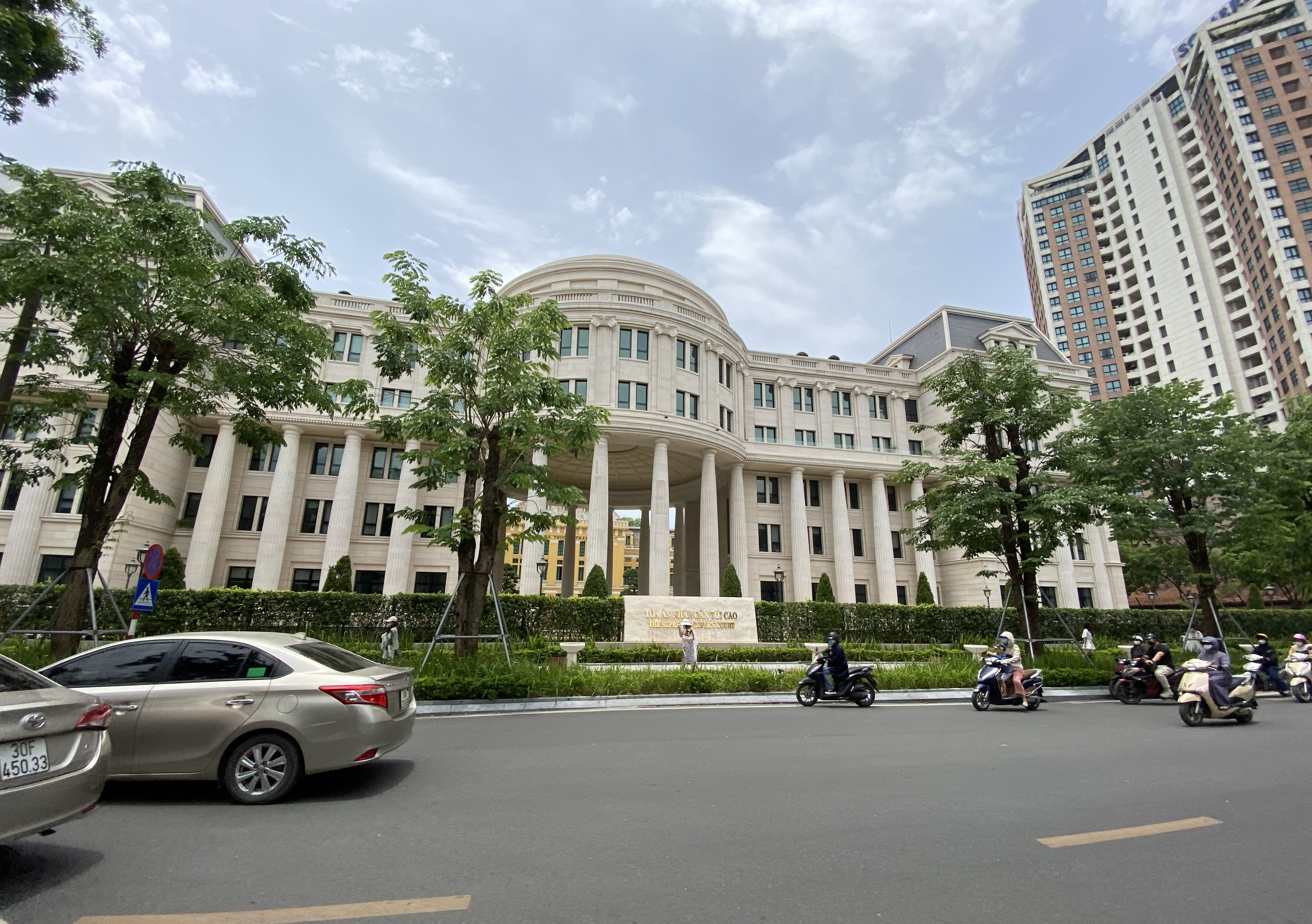
The Supreme People's Court building

The Supreme People's Court (SPC) is the highest court for appeal and review, and reports to the National Assembly, which controls the judiciary's budget and confirms the president's nominees to the SPC and SPP. Below the SPC are district and provincial people's courts, military tribunals, and administrative, economic and labor courts. The people's courts are the courts of first instance. The Ministry of Defence (MOD) has military tribunals, which have the same rules as civil courts. Military judges and assessors are selected by the MOD and the SPC, and the SPC has supervisory responsibility.

Main office-holders
Office	Name	Party	Since
Head of the Steering Committee of the Central Judicial Reform	Tô Lâm	Communist Party	8 April 2026
Chief Justice of the Supreme People's Court	Nguyễn Văn Quảng	Communist Party	10 November 2025
Director of the Supreme People's Procuracy	Nguyễn Huy Tiến	Communist Party	26 August 2024

=== Local government ===
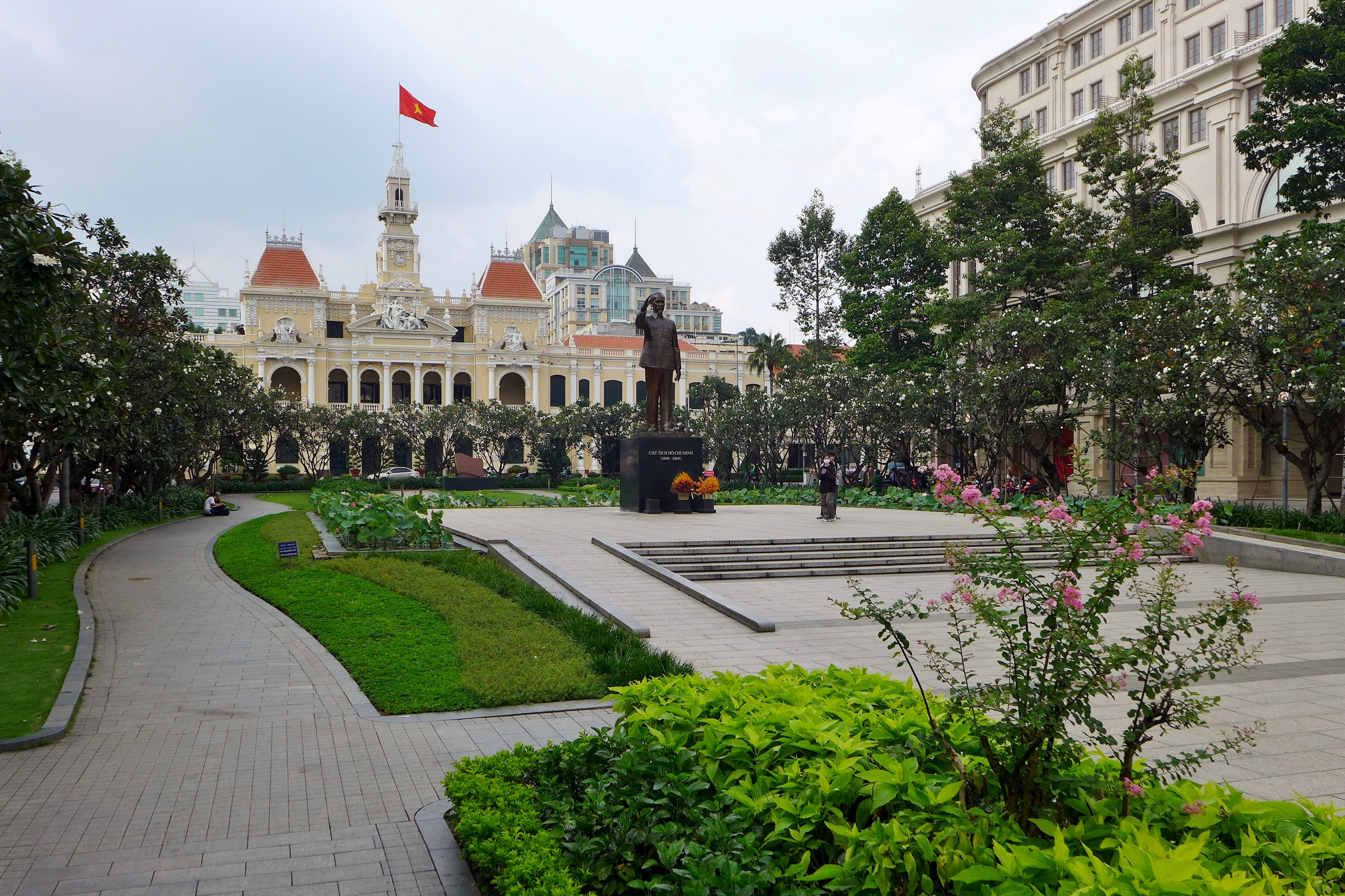
The Ho Chi Minh City Hall as seen in 2023.

Provinces and municipalities are subdivided into towns, districts and villages. Provinces and municipalities are centrally controlled by the national government. Towns, districts and villages are locally accountable to some degree through elected people's councils.

== Bibliography ==
- Ashwill, Mark; Thai, Ngoc Diep (2005). Vietnam Today: A Guide to a Nation at a Crossroads. Intercultural Press. ISBN 9781931930093.
- Brocheux, Pierre (2007). Ho Chi Minh: a Biography. Cambridge University Press. ISBN 9780521850629.
- East, Roger; Thomas, Richard (2003). Profiles of People in Power: The World's Government Leaders. Routledge. ISBN 9781857431261.
- Porter, Gareth (1993). Vietnam: The Politics of Bureaucratic Socialism. Cornell University Press. ISBN 9780801421686.
- Gillespie, John Stanley (2006). Transplanting Commercial Law Reform: Developing a 'Rule of Law' in Vietnam. Ashgate Publishing. ISBN 9780754647041.
- Hasan, Samiul; Onyx, Jenny (2008). Comparative Third Sector Governance in Asia: Structure, Process, and Political Economy. Springer. ISBN 9780387755663.
- Napier, Nancy K.; Vuong, Quan Hoang (2013). What We See, Why We Worry, Why We Hope: Vietnam Going Forward. Boise State University CCI Press. ISBN 9780985530587.
- Quinn-Judge, Sophie (2002). Ho Chi Minh: The Missing Years, 1919–1941. University of California Press. ISBN 9780520235335.
- Rowley, Chris (2008). The Changing Face of Management in South East Asia. Taylor & Francis. ISBN 9780415405447.
- Van, Canh Nguyen; Cooper, Earle (1983). Vietnam under Communism, 1975–1982. Hoover Press. ISBN 9780817978518.
