= 14th Politburo of the Communist Party of Vietnam =

The 14th Politburo of the Communist Party of Vietnam (CPV), formally the 14th Political Bureau of the Central Committee of the Communist Party of Vietnam, was elected at the 1st Plenary Session of the 14th Central Committee (CC) in the immediate aftermath of the 14th National Congress. Tô Lâm was re-elected as General Secretary of the Communist Party of Vietnam, a position he has held since 2024.

== Composition ==
The current 19-member Politburo was elected on January 23, 2026, at the first plenum of the 14th Central Committee of the Communist Party of Vietnam following the respective 14th National Party Congress. The current ranking is nominated following the confirmation of the 16th Government.

Members of the 14th Politburo of the Communist Party of Vietnam
Rank	Name		In the 13th	Birth	PM	Birthplace	Education	Ethnicity	Gender	Ref.
1	Tô Lâm	Tô Lâm	Member	1957	1981	Hưng Yên	Postgraduate	Kinh	Male	
2		Lê Minh Hưng	Member	1970	2000	Hà Tĩnh	Graduate	Kinh	Male	
3		Trần Thanh Mẫn	Member	1962	1982	Cần Thơ	Postgraduate	Kinh	Male	
4		Trần Cẩm Tú	Member	1961	1990	Hà Tĩnh	Postgraduate	Kinh	Male	
5		Đỗ Văn Chiến	Member	1962	1986	Tuyên Quang	Postgraduate	Sán Dìu	Male	
6		Bùi Thị Minh Hoài	Member	1965	1991	Ninh Bình	Graduate	Kinh	Female	
7		Phan Văn Giang	Member	1960	1982	Ninh Bình	Postgraduate	Kinh	Male	
8		Lương Tam Quang	Member	1965	1998	Hưng Yên	Undergraduate	Kinh	Male	
9		Nguyễn Duy Ngọc	Member	1964	1986	Hưng Yên	Postgraduate	Kinh	Male	
10		Nguyễn Trọng Nghĩa	Member	1962	1982	Đồng Tháp	Undergraduate	Kinh	Male	
11		Trịnh Văn Quyết	Nonmember	1966	—	Hải Phòng	Undergraduate	Kinh	Male	
12		Lê Hoài Trung	Nonmember	1961	1986	Huế	Postgraduate	Kinh	Male	
13		Lê Minh Trí	Nonmember	1960	1984	Hồ Chí Minh	Undergraduate	Kinh	Male	
14		Trần Lưu Quang	Nonmember	1967	1997	Tây Ninh	Undergraduate	Kinh	Male	
15		Phạm Gia Túc	Nonmember	1965	1989	Ninh Bình	Graduate	Kinh	Male	
16		Trần Sỹ Thanh	Nonmember	1971	1995	Nghệ An	Graduate	Kinh	Male	
17		Nguyễn Thanh Nghị	Nonmember	1976	1999	Cà Mau	Graduate	Kinh	Male	
18		Đoàn Minh Huấn	Nonmember	1971	1995	Hà Tĩnh	Postgraduate	Kinh	Male	
19		Trần Đức Thắng	Nonmember	1973	2002	Phú Thọ	Postgraduate	Kinh	Male	
