= Politburo of the Communist Party of Vietnam =

Executive committee for communist parties

Political Bureau of the Communist Party of Vietnam Central Committee Bộ Chính trị Ban Chấp hành trung ương Đảng Cộng sản Việt Nam

Information
- General Secretary: Tô Lâm
- Elected by: Central Committee
- Responsible to: Central Committee
- Seats: 19 (see 14th Politburo)

Meeting place
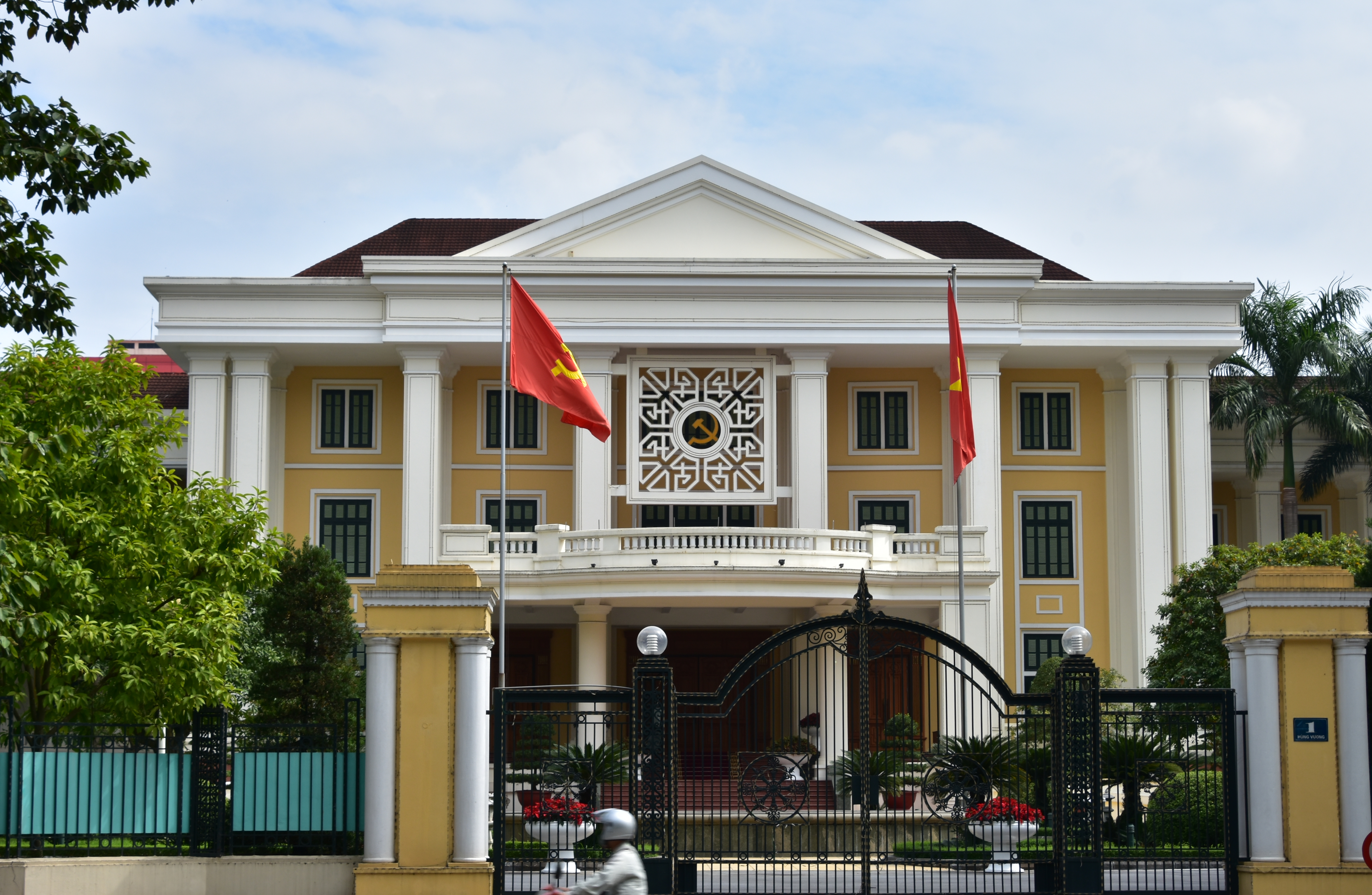
- Seat of the Communist Party of Vietnam where the Politburo meets

The Political Bureau of the Communist Party of Vietnam Central Committee is the highest body of the Communist Party of Vietnam (CPV) in between gatherings of the National Congress and of the plenary sessions of the Central Committee. According to Party rules, the Political Bureau (Politburo) directs the general orientation of the government, and by that, it has dominant power in the politics of Vietnam.

The members of the Politburo are elected and given a ranking by the Central Committee in the aftermath of a National Party Congress. The 14th Politburo was elected by the 1st Plenary Session of the 14th Central Committee in the aftermath of the 14th National Congress and consists of 19 members. The first-ranked member is General Secretary of the Central Committee.

== Duties and responsibilities ==
The Politburo is a subunit of the Central Committee, the supreme organ on party affairs. The members of the Central Committee, when the Party Congress has ended, freely elects the composition of the Politburo. The number of Politburo members is also decided by the Central Committee membership. Until 1990, there were two different forms of Politburo membership: full and alternate. When the Secretariat was abolished in 1996, a Politburo Standing Committee (also known as the Politburo Standing Board) was established. Unlike the Secretariat, the Politburo Standing Committee was appointed by the Politburo and not the Central Committee. The Politburo Standing Committee was abolished in 2001 at the 9th National Congress, and the Secretariat was reestablished. Elected members are given rankings in an order of precedence.

The Politburo is the leading organ on Party affairs; the Central Committee convenes twice a year, and the Politburo can implement policies which has been approved by either the previous Party Congress or the Central Committee. It is the duty of the Politburo to ensure that resolutions of the Party Congress and the Central Committee are implemented nationally. It is also responsible for matters related to organisation and personnel, and has the right to prepare (and convene) a Central Committee plenary session. The Politburo can be overruled by the Central Committee, as happened in 2001 when the Politburo voted in favour of retaining Lê Khả Phiêu as General Secretary; the Central Committee responded by overturning the Politburo decision, dismissed Lê from active politics altogether, and forced the Central Committee to elect a new General Secretary after the 9th National Congress.

Meetings are held regularly; decisions within the Politburo are made through collective decision-making, which means that policies are only enacted if a majority of Politburo members support them. In the 1960s, outside analysts believed the Politburo was divided into two factions (pro-China and pro-Soviet); this forced Politburo members to decide policy through compromise. This was later proven wrong, because Hồ Chí Minh became a staunch believer in collective decision-making during the 1950s after the beginning of de-Stalinisation in the Soviet Union. Hồ's successor, Lê Duẩn, stated at the 4th National Congress that "Only with collective decisions made by collective intelligence will we be able to avoid subjectivism that leads to errors and sometimes to dangerous consequences". Hồ's emphasis on the maintenance of unity led the CPV to eschew the Chinese Communist Party's (CCP) policy of "criticism and self-criticism". The CCP's criticism and self-criticism policy was used to resolve "internal contradictions"; the problem with this concept was that it always assumed that one side was right. "Criticism and self-criticism" was not introduced in Vietnam, chiefly for this reason.

Zachary Abuza (author of Renovating Politics in Contemporary Vietnam) claims that Politburo decision-making is built on factional infighting and ideological differences rather than on any notion of collective leadership. The Politburo is responsible to the Central Committee, and the Central Committee can question the Politburo. The composition of the Central Military Commission, the leading Party organ on military affairs, is decided by the Politburo. It is the responsibility of the Secretariat (not the Politburo) to ensure the implementation of directives stemming from the Politburo.

=== Power in relation to the state ===
Before the reforms of Nguyễn Văn Linh during the 1980s, the Politburo was the supreme decision-making organ in all areas of party and state. Before 1988, the Politburo had no clearer guideline on its responsibilities on socioeconomic issues. Because of this lack, the Politburo more frequently meddled in the affairs of the Council of Ministers (the central government). Until 1988, the Politburo made detailed planning and budgetary decisions; from 1988 onward, the Politburo decides a plan's general orientation, and lets the central government make detailed socioeconomic decisions. The all-encompassing role of the Politburo before 1988 blurred the roles of the party and state in the decision-making process. Another problem until 1988 was that more members of the Politburo were leading officials within the state (again blurring the roles of party and state).

The Politburo has the unofficial power to appoint members of the central government through the National Assembly of Vietnam. Because the National Assembly is dominated by the party, party leadership has considerable leverage in appointing members of the central government. If the Politburo decides the appointment of officials, party members can oppose the nominees; the appointment of Đỗ Mười was opposed by the Club of Resistance Veterans, a group of reformist communist cadres.

== 14th Politburo members ==
The current 19-member Politburo was elected on January 23, 2026, at the first plenum of the 14th Central Committee of the Communist Party of Vietnam following the respective 14th National Party Congress. The current ranking is nominated following the confirmation of the 16th Government.

Members of the 14th Politburo of the Communist Party of Vietnam
Rank	Name		13th	Birth	PM	Birthplace	Education	Ethnicity	Gender	Ref.
1	Tô Lâm	Tô Lâm	Member	1957	1981	Hưng Yên	Postgraduate	Kinh	Male	
2		Lê Minh Hưng	Member	1970	2000	Hà Tĩnh	Graduate	Kinh	Male	
3		Trần Thanh Mẫn	Member	1962	1982	Cần Thơ	Postgraduate	Kinh	Male	
4		Trần Cẩm Tú	Member	1961	1990	Hà Tĩnh	Postgraduate	Kinh	Male	
5		Đỗ Văn Chiến	Member	1962	1986	Tuyên Quang	Postgraduate	Sán Dìu	Male	
6		Bùi Thị Minh Hoài	Member	1965	1991	Ninh Bình	Graduate	Kinh	Female	
7		Phan Văn Giang	Member	1960	1982	Ninh Bình	Postgraduate	Kinh	Male	
8		Lương Tam Quang	Member	1965	1998	Hưng Yên	Undergraduate	Kinh	Male	
9		Nguyễn Duy Ngọc	Member	1964	1986	Hưng Yên	Postgraduate	Kinh	Male	
10		Nguyễn Trọng Nghĩa	Member	1962	1982	Đồng Tháp	Undergraduate	Kinh	Male	
11		Trịnh Văn Quyết	Nonmember	1966	—	Hải Phòng	Undergraduate	Kinh	Male	
12		Lê Hoài Trung	Nonmember	1961	1986	Huế	Postgraduate	Kinh	Male	
13		Lê Minh Trí	Nonmember	1960	1984	Hồ Chí Minh	Undergraduate	Kinh	Male	
14		Trần Lưu Quang	Nonmember	1967	1997	Tây Ninh	Undergraduate	Kinh	Male	
15		Phạm Gia Túc	Nonmember	1965	1989	Ninh Bình	Graduate	Kinh	Male	
16		Trần Sỹ Thanh	Nonmember	1971	1995	Nghệ An	Graduate	Kinh	Male	
17		Nguyễn Thanh Nghị	Nonmember	1976	1999	Cà Mau	Graduate	Kinh	Male	
18		Đoàn Minh Huấn	Nonmember	1971	1995	Hà Tĩnh	Postgraduate	Kinh	Male	
19		Trần Đức Thắng	Nonmember	1973	2002	Phú Thọ	Postgraduate	Kinh	Male	
