= Trương Thị Mai =

Vietnamese politician

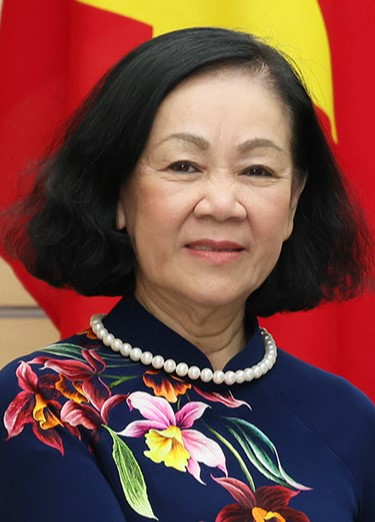
- Mai in 2024

Permanent Member of the Secretariat
- In office 6 March 2023 – 16 May 2024
- General Secretary: Nguyễn Phú Trọng
- Preceded by: Võ Văn Thưởng
- Succeeded by: Lương Cường

Head of the Central Organization Commission
- In office 8 April 2021 – 15 June 2024
- Preceded by: Phạm Minh Chính
- Succeeded by: Lê Minh Hưng

Head of the Central Mass Mobilisation Commission
- In office 4 February 2016 – 8 April 2021
- Preceded by: Hà Thị Khiết
- Succeeded by: Bùi Thị Minh Hoài

Chair of the National Assembly Social Affairs Committee
- In office 20 May 2007 – 5 April 2016
- Chairman: Nguyễn Phú Trọng; Nguyễn Sinh Hùng
- Preceded by: Nguyễn Thị Hoài Thu
- Succeeded by: Nguyễn Thuý Anh

Personal details
- Born: January 23, 1958 (age 68) Quảng Bình, North Vietnam
- Party: Communist Party of Vietnam (1985–present)
- Education: Dalat University; National Academy of Public Administration (Vietnam); Hồ Chí Minh National Academy of Politics
- Occupation: Politician

Trương Thị Mai (Vietnamese pronunciation: [t͡ɕɨəŋ˧˧ tʰi˧˨ʔ maːj˧˧]; born 23 January 1958) is a Vietnamese politician. She was the Permanent Member of the Secretariat (Note: officially the Permanent Member of the Communist Party of Vietnam Central Committee's Secretariat, also known as the Executive Secretary) and Head of the Central Organization Commission of the Communist Party of Vietnam, being the first woman to hold these positions.

Mai was a member of both the Secretariat and Politburo, the country's highest decision-making bodies, in which she ranked 5th (after the General Secretary, the President, the Prime Minister and the National Assembly Chair), which made her the most powerful woman in Vietnamese politics.

A member of the Party Central Committee since 2006, she was previously the Head of the Party's Mass Mobilisation Commission. A long-time member of the National Assembly of Vietnam since 1997, Mai also served as Chair of the Parliamentary Committee for Social Affairs and Deputy Chair of the Parliamentary Committee for Culture, Education, Youth, Adolescents and Children. She was the President of the Vietnam–Cuba Friendship Association.

Before entering national politics, Mai was the President of the Vietnam Youth Federation, being the first woman to do so. She was also a Permanent Member of the Central Committee's Secretariat of the Hồ Chí Minh Communist Youth Union.

== Background ==
Trương Thị Mai was born on January 23, 1958, in Quảng Bình Province, Vietnam. Her family moved to Da Lat, Lâm Đồng when she was young. She grew up here and majored in History at Dalat University, receiving a Bachelor of History.

== Career ==
=== Communist Youth Union ===
Mai has spent years working in Hồ Chí Minh Communist Youth Union. From October 15 to 18, 1992, National Congress of the Hồ Chí Minh Communist Youth Union took place in Hanoi, electing her a member of the Hồ Chí Minh Communist Youth Union Central Committee's Secretariat. In 1997, she continued to be elected to Central Committee's Secretariat. In the same year, she was appointed Vice President and General Secretary of the Central Committee of the Vietnam Youth Federation, while still working in the Youth Union at the same time. In March 1998, she was officially elected President of Vietnam Youth Federation, becoming the first female president of this organization.

=== National Assembly ===
Mai has been a member of the National Assembly of Vietnam since 1997. In 1997, she was elected a Member of the National Assembly, Cà Mau Province Delegation, and also a member of National Assembly Law Committee. From 2002 - 2007, she was a member of the Trà Vinh Delegation to the National Assembly.

From 2007 – 2011, she was a member of Bình Phước Delegation to the National Assembly. On May 20, 2007, after the first session of the 12th National Assembly, she was elected a member of Standing Committee of the National Assembly and the Chairwoman of the National Assembly Social Affairs Committee. On January 18, 2011, at the 11th Congress of the Communist Party of Vietnam, she was elected a member of the Central Committee of the Communist Party of Vietnam. She also continued to be a member of Standing Committee of the National Assembly and the Chairwoman of the National Assembly Social Affairs Committee.

From 2011 to 2021, she was a Member of the National Assembly, Lâm Đồng Delegation. She was elected a member of the National Assembly on May 22, 2016, in constituency 02, including the 3 districts: Lâm Hà District, Đam Rông District and Di Linh District. She got 194,275 votes, 79.93% of total valid votes.

In November 2014, she got the third highest number of votes, in a vote of confidence, after the Chairwoman of the National Assembly Nguyen Thi Kim Ngan and the President Truong Tan Sang.

=== Party Central Committee ===
On January 26, 2016, at the 12th National Congress of the Communist Party of Vietnam, she was elected a member of the Central Committee of the Communist Party of Vietnam. The next day, on January 27, 2016, she was elected to the Politburo of the Central Committee of the Communist Party of Vietnam. On February 4, 2016, she became a member of the Secretariat of the Central Committee of the Communist Party of Vietnam, and the Head of the Mass Mobilisation Commission of the CPV Central Committee.

In April 2016, she was appointed by the Politburo to be a member of the Presidium of the Central Committee of the Vietnam Fatherland Front. On May 24, 2017, she became the President of the Vietnam - Cuba Friendship Association, succeeding Nguyen Thi Kim Ngan.

=== Politburo ===
==== Organization Commission ====
On January 30, 2021, at the 13th National Congress of the Communist Party of Vietnam, she was elected as a full member of the 13th Central Committee of the Communist Party of Vietnam. The next day, on January 31, at the first plenum of the 13th Party Central Committee, she was elected a member of the Politburo of the Communist Party of Vietnam. On April 8, 2021, she was appointed Head of Organization Commission of the Central Committee of the Communist Party of Vietnam, succeeding Phạm Minh Chính, the first-ever woman to hold the position.

==== Secretariat ====
On 6 March 2023, the 13th Politburo appointed Mai to the post Permanent Member of the Secretariat, succeeding Võ Văn Thưởng, who left office after his election as President of Vietnam on 2 March 2023. Mai is the first woman to hold this position. She resigned on 16 May 2024, after she committed what the party said were regulation violations that negatively impacted the party and the nation.
