= 13th Politburo of the Communist Party of Vietnam =

Politburo of Vietnam's Communist Party

The 13th Politburo of the Communist Party of Vietnam (CPV), formally the 13th Political Bureau of the Central Committee of the Communist Party of Vietnam (Vietnamese: Bộ Chính trị Ban Chấp hành trung ương Đảng Cộng sản Việt Nam Khoá XIII), was elected at the 1st Plenary Session of the 13th Central Committee (CC) in the immediate aftermath of the 13th National Congress. Nguyễn Phú Trọng was re-elected for his third term as General Secretary of the Communist Party of Vietnam, a position he has held since 2011.

On 30 December 2022, at the 13th CC's 2nd Extraordinary Plenary Session, Phạm Bình Minh offered his resignation as a member of the 13th Politburo; the plenum approved the resignation, and he was removed from the 13th CC as well. Nguyễn Xuân Phúc, the President of Vietnam and the second-ranked member of the 13th Politburo, voluntarily resigned from all state and party offices at the 3rd Extraordinary Plenary Session on 17 January 2023.

== Composition ==
Members of the 13th Politburo of the Communist Party of Vietnam
| Name | 12th | 14th | Birth | PM | Birthplace | Education | Ethnicity | Gender | Ref. |
|---|---|---|---|---|---|---|---|---|---|
| Trần Tuấn Anh (Note: Trần Tuấn Anh voluntarily resigned as a member of the 13th Politburo at the 5th Extraordinary Session of the 13th Central Committee, held on 31 January 2024.) | Nonmember | Nonmember | 1964 | 1996 | Quảng Ngãi province | Graduate | Kinh | Male | |
| Nguyễn Hòa Bình | Nonmember | Nonmember | 1958 | 1981 | Quảng Ngãi province | Graduate | Kinh | Male | |
| Đỗ Văn Chiến (Note: Đỗ Văn Chiến was elected a member of the 13th Politburo by the 9th Plenary Session of the 13th Central Committee, held on 16–18 May 2024.) | Nonmember | Member | 1962 | 1986 | Tuyên Quang province | Graduate | San Diu | Male | |
| Phạm Minh Chính | Member | Nonmember | 1958 | 1986 | Thanh Hoá province | Graduate | Kinh | Male | |
| Lương Cường | Nonmember | Nonmember | 1958 | 1978 | Phú Thọ province | Undergraduate | Kinh | Male | |
| Đinh Tiến Dũng (Note: Đinh Tiến Dũng voluntarily resigned as a member of the 13th Politburo on 20 June 2024, one day before the convening of the 8th Extraordinary Session of the 13th Central Committee.) | Nonmember | Nonmember | 1961 | 1987 | Ninh Bình province | Graduate | Kinh | Male | |
| Phan Văn Giang | Nonmember | Member | 1960 | — | Nam Định province | Graduate | Kinh | Male | |
| Bùi Thị Minh Hoài (Note: Bùi Thị Minh Hoài was elected a member of the 13th Politburo by the 9th Plenary Session of the 13th Central Committee, held on 16–18 May 2024.) | Nonmember | Member | 1965 | 1991 | Hà Nam province | Graduate | Kinh | Female | |
| Vương Đình Huệ (Note: Vương Đình Huệ voluntarily resigned as a member of the 13th Politburo at the 7th Extraordinary Session of the 13th Central Committee, held on 26 April 2024.) | Member | Nonmember | 1957 | 1984 | Nghệ An province | Graduate | Kinh | Male | |
| Lê Minh Hưng (Note: Lê Minh Hưng was elected a member of the 13th Politburo by the 9th Plenary Session of the 13th Central Committee, held on 16–18 May 2024.) | Nonmember | Member | 1970 | 2000 | Hà Tĩnh province | Graduate | Kinh | Male | |
| Tô Lâm | Member | Member | 1956 | 1981 | Hưng Yên province | Graduate | Kinh | Male | |
| Trương Thị Mai (Note: Trương Thị Mai voluntarily resigned as a member of the 13th Politburo at the 9th Plenary Session of the 13th Central Committee, held on 16–18 May 2024.) | Member | Nonmember | 1958 | 1985 | Quảng Bình province | Graduate | Kinh | Female | |
| Trần Thanh Mẫn | Nonmember | Member | 1962 | 1982 | Hậu Giang province | Graduate | Kinh | Male | |
| Phạm Bình Minh (Note: Phạm Bình Minh voluntarily resigned as a member of the 13th Politburo at the 2nd Extraordinary Session of the 13th Central Committee, held on 30 December 2022.) | Member | Nonmember | 1959 | 1984 | Nam Định province | Graduate | Kinh | Male | |
| Nguyễn Văn Nên | Nonmember | Nonmember | 1957 | 1978 | Tây Ninh province | Undergraduate | Kinh | Male | |
| Nguyễn Trọng Nghĩa (Note: Nguyễn Trọng Nghĩa was elected a member of the 13th Politburo by the 9th Plenary Session of the 13th Central Committee, held on 16–18 May 2024.) | Nonmember | Member | 1962 | 1982 | Tiền Giang province | Graduate | Kinh | Male | |
| Nguyễn Duy Ngọc (Note: Nguyễn Duy Ngọc was elected a member of the 13th Politburo by the 12th Extraordinary Session of the 13th Central Committee, held on 23–24 January 2025.) | Nonmember | Member | 1964 | 1986 | Hưng Yên | Postgraduate | Kinh | Male | |
| Nguyễn Xuân Phúc (Note: Nguyễn Xuân Phúc voluntarily resigned as a member of the 13th Politburo at the 3rd Extraordinary Session of the 13th Central Committee, held on 17 January 2023.) | Member | Nonmember | 1954 | 1982 | Quảng Nam province | Undergraduate | Kinh | Male | |
| Lương Tam Quang (Note: Lương Tam Quang was elected a member of the 13th Politburo by the 10th Extraordinary Session of the 13th Central Committee, held on 16 August 2024.) | Nonmember | Member | 1965 | 1998 | Hưng Yên province | Graduate | Kinh | Male | |
| Nguyễn Xuân Thắng | Nonmember | Nonmember | 1957 | 1983 | Nghệ An province | Graduate | Kinh | Male | |
| Võ Văn Thưởng (Note: Võ Văn Thưởng voluntarily resigned as a member of the 13th Politburo at the 6th Extraordinary Session of the 13th Central Committee, held on 20 March 2024.) | Member | Nonmember | 1970 | 1993 | Vĩnh Long province | Graduate | Kinh | Male | |
| Phan Đình Trạc | Nonmember | Nonmember | 1958 | 1980 | Nghệ An province | Undergraduate | Kinh | Male | |
| Nguyễn Phú Trọng (Note: Nguyễn Phú Trọng died of natural causes on 19 July 2024.) | Member | Nonmember | 1944 | 1968 | Hà Nội City | Graduate | Kinh | Male | |
| Trần Cẩm Tú | Nonmember | Member | 1961 | 1990 | Hà Tĩnh province | Graduate | Kinh | Male | |

== Bibliography ==
- Truong, Mai (2022). "Declining opportunities for speaking out: The impact of Vietnam's new leadership on grassroots collective action". Asian Journal of Comparative Politics. OnlineFirst: 50–68. doi:10.1177/20578911221139764. S2CID 254009559.
