= Central Mass Mobilisation Commission =

Advisory body to the Central Committee

The Central Mass Mobilization Department of the Central Committee of the Communist Party of Vietnam was formerly an advisory body to the Central Committee, and directly subordinate to the Politburo, responsible for mass mobilization work. It is chiefly responsible for public security and public relations. In February 2025, it was merged with the Central Information and Education Commission to form the Central Commission for Information, Education and Mass Mobilization.

== Heads ==
- Xuân Thủy (1976–1978)
- Nguyễn Văn Linh (1978–1980)
- Trần Quốc Hoàn (1980–1986)
- Vũ Oanh (1986–1987)
- Phan Minh Tánh (1987–1996)
- Phạm Thế Duyệt (1996–1997)
- Nguyễn Minh Triết (1997–2000)
- Trương Quang Được (2000–2002)
- Tòng Thị Phóng (2002–2007)
- Hà Thị Khiết (2007–2016)
- Trương Thị Mai (2016–2021)
- Bùi Thị Minh Hoài (2021–2024)
- Mai Văn Chính (2024-present)
