= Organisation Commission of the Communist Party of Vietnam =

The Organisation Commission of the Central Committee of the Communist Party of Vietnam is an advisory body to the Central Committee that is directly subordinate to the Politburo. It is one of the most important institutions in Vietnamese politics by having the main responsibilities being to nominate and to approve the appointment of officials throughout the country. All former heads have been members of the Politburo and the Secretariat while they were in office.

The current Head of the Central Organization Commission is Nguyễn Duy Ngọc.

== Heads ==
- Lê Văn Lương (1948–1956)
- Lê Đức Thọ (1956–1973)
- Lê Văn Lương (1973–1976)
- Lê Đức Thọ (1976–1980)
- Nguyễn Đức Tâm (1980–1991)
- Lê Phước Thọ (1991–1996)
- Nguyễn Văn An (1996–2001)
- Trần Đình Hoan (2001–2006)
- Hồ Đức Việt (2006–2011)
- Tô Huy Rứa (2011–2016)
- Phạm Minh Chính (2016–2021)
- Trương Thị Mai (2021–2024)
- Lê Minh Hưng (2024–2026)
- Nguyễn Duy Ngọc (2026-present)
