= Dalat University =

Vietnamese university

Coordinates: 11°57′20.3″N 108°26′34.29″E

- Đại học Đà Lạt
- Former name: Viện Đại học Đà Lạt (1957–1975)
- Motto: Thụ nhân – Khai phóng – Bản sắc
- Motto in English: Nurture – Liberal – Identity
- Type: Public
- Established: August 08, 1957 (as Viện Đại học Đà Lạt); October 27, 1976 (as Đại học Đà Lạt)
- Principal: Dr. Le Minh Chien
- Location: Da Lat, Lam Dong, Vietnam
- Campus: 1.7 hectares (4.2 acres); Urban
- Website: www.dlu.edu.vn

Dalat University or the University of Dalat (Vietnamese: Đại học Đà Lạt, French: Université de Dalat; formerly Viện Đại học Đà Lạt (1957–1975)) is a university in the city of Đà Lạt, capital of Lâm Đồng Province, Vietnam.

== History ==
The original Dalat University was established in 1957 – after support of and requests by Archbishop Pierre Martin Ngô Đình Thục – by the Council of Vietnamese Catholic Bishops as a centre for education. After the Fall of Saigon in 1975, the Vietnamese name was changed to Đại học Đà Lạt (Dalat University).

Today, it is a multidisciplinary public university that offers undergraduate and graduate education for the Central Highlands and the South Central Coast regions.

== Location ==
Dalat University is in the center of Dalat – a popular tourist city on Lâm Viên Plateau with a year-round cool climate, vast pine forests, flowers, fog, and waterfalls.

The campus sits on a hilly area of 40 hectares north of Xuan Huong Lake, beside an international 18-hole golf course. There is also a variety of styled buildings hidden throughout the pine trees. The location of the campus is conducive to learning and researching.

== Programs, faculties and departments ==
=== Programs ===
At present, the university offers over 40 programs at the undergraduate level and 10 graduate programmes in Mathematics, Physics, Chemistry, Biology, Ecology, English, Vietnamese History, Vietnamese Literature, Business Administration and Law.

The university also offers 7 doctorate programmes including Mathematics, Physics, Chemistry, Ecology, Vietnamese Literature, Vietnamese History and Business Administration.

=== Faculties ===
- Mathematics and Computer Science
- Information Technology
- Physics and Nuclear Science
- Chemistry and Environment
- Literature and History
- Biology
- Foreign Languages
- Business Administration
- Tourism
- Law
- Environment Management
- Agriculture and Sylviculture
- Sociology and Community Development
  - Social Work and Community Development
  - Sociology
- Pedagogy

=== Departments ===
- Inspector Department
- Finance Department
- Personnel Organisation and Administration Department
- Department of Academic Affairs
- Department of Post-graduate Academic Affairs
- Facilities Department
- Department of Quality Administration
- Department of Science Management and International Cooperation
- Magazine and Communications Department

== Notable alumni ==
- Trương Thị Mai, former Permanent Member of the Communist Party of Vietnam Central Committee's Secretariat and Head of the Central Organization Commission of the Communist Party of Vietnam.
- Lê Cung Bắc, Film Director
- Nguyễn Đức Quang, Songwriter
- Nguyễn Quốc Toản, Founder and CEO of TP&P Technology
- Hieu Van Le, 35th governor of South Australia
