= Nguyễn Thanh Nghị =

Vietnamese politician (born 1976)

- Nghị in 2026

Head of Party Central Policy and Strategy Commission
- Incumbent
- Assumed office August 25, 2025
- General Secretary: Tô Lâm
- Preceded by: Trần Lưu Quang

Permanent Deputy Party Secretary of the Ho Chi Minh City
- In office January 25 – August 25, 2025
- Secretary: Nguyễn Văn Nên
- Preceded by: Nguyễn Hồ Hải
- Succeeded by: Lê Quốc Phong

Minister of Construction
- In office April 8, 2021 – February 18, 2025
- Prime Minister: Phạm Minh Chính
- Preceded by: Phạm Hồng Hà
- Succeeded by: Trần Hồng Minh

Deputy Minister of Construction
- In office October 5, 2020 – April 8, 2021
- Minister: Phạm Hồng Hà
- In office November 2011 – February 2014
- Minister: Trịnh Đình Dũng

Party Secretary of Kiên Giang
- In office October 16, 2015 – October 17, 2020
- Preceded by: Trần Minh Thống
- Succeeded by: Đỗ Thanh Bình

Vice Chairman of Kiên Giang Provincial People's Committee
- In office March 28, 2014 – October 16, 2015
- Chairnan: Lê Văn Thi

Deputy Party Secretary of Kiên Giang
- In office February 28, 2014 – October 16, 2015
- Secretary: Trần Minh Thống

Vice Rector of Ho Chi Minh City University of Architecture
- In office 2008 – 2011

Personal details
- Born: 12 August 1976 (age 50) Cà Mau, Vietnam
- Party: Communist Party of Vietnam
- Parent(s): Nguyễn Tấn Dũng (father); Trần Thanh Kiệm (mother)
- Education: University of Architecture Ho Chi Minh City; George Washington University

Nguyễn Thanh Nghị (born 1976) is a Vietnamese politician. He is currently a member of the 14th Politburo of the Communist Party of Vietnam, Head of Central Policies and Strategies Commission of the Communist Party of Vietnam, since 2025. He was Secretary of the Kien Giang Provincial Party Committee from 2015 to 2020 and was the youngest Provincial Party Secretary in the country at the time of his appointment, and Minister of Construction, and Permanent Deputy Secretary of the Ho Chi Minh City Party Committee. He is the son of former Prime Minister of Vietnam Nguyễn Tấn Dũng.
