= Cuba–Vietnam relations =

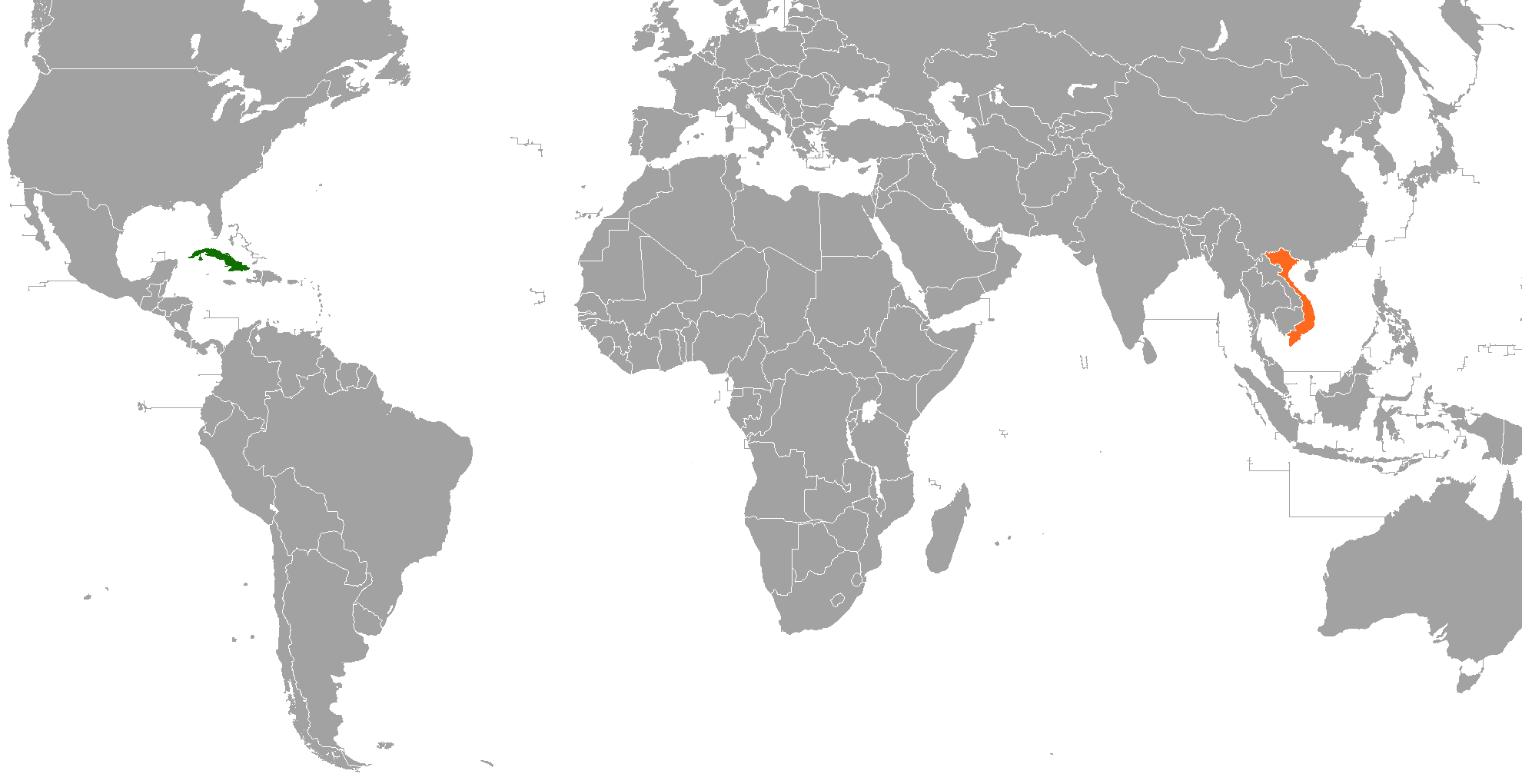

- Cuba: Vietnam

Diplomatic mission
- Embassy of Cuba, Hanoi: Embassy of Vietnam, Havana

Cuban–Vietnam relations are the interstate and special relations between the Republic of Cuba and the Socialist Republic of Vietnam. The relations are based on trade, credits, and investments which have increased significantly since the 1990s and on shared ideological beliefs – they are both socialist states. Diplomatic relations between the post-revolutionary Cuba and the Democratic Republic of Vietnam were established on December 12, 1960. Since then, Vietnam has become Cuba's second-largest trading partner in Asia, behind China.

== History ==
Following the 1954 Geneva Conference, which partitioned Vietnam into North Vietnam and South Vietnam, Cuba under Fulgencio Batista aligned itself with the anti-communist bloc and refused to recognize North Vietnam diplomatically. Instead, Cuba formally recognized South Vietnam on 3 November 1955. After the Cuban Revolution overthrew Batista in 1959, Fidel Castro announced that Cuba would recognize North Vietnam and withdrew recognition of South Vietnam. Following a meeting between Prime Minister of North Vietnam Phạm Văn Đồng and the Foreign Minister of Cuba Raúl Roa García, North Vietnam and Cuba officially established diplomatic relations on 2 December 1960. Cuba thus became the first diplomatic ally of North Vietnam in the Western Hemisphere.

During the Vietnam War, Cuba, as an ally of the Soviet Union, provided construction workers and medical aid teams to North Vietnam. At the same time, Cuba supported the National Liberation Front of South Vietnam in its struggle against the Government of South Vietnam. Cuba also recognized the Provisional Revolutionary Government of the Republic of South Vietnam on 11 June 1969, maintaining relations until Vietnam’s formal reunification in July 1976. Castro famously declared that “Cuba is willing to shed its blood for Vietnam.” Following the signing of the Paris Peace Accords, Castro visited Quảng Trị Province in 1973 after it had come under North Vietnamese control. After the reunification of Vietnam, Cuba also supported the newly established Socialist Republic of Vietnam in joining the United Nations on 20 September 1977.

According to Rodrigo Malmierca Díaz, Cuba's Minister of Foreign Trade and Investment, Cuba's bilateral relations with Vietnam were committed to consolidating "the special relationship, loyal friendship, and comprehensive cooperation with Vietnam, governments and peoples". Diaz, who is also Chairman of the Cuba–Vietnam Cooperation Subcommittee, said the goal of both nations was to make economic cooperation on a par with their political relationship. Trịnh Đình Dũng, the Minister of Construction and the Head of the Vietnam–Cuba Cooperation Subcommittee, said Vietnam would do its best to promote bilateral cooperation "in economics, trade, culture, education, and science and technology, as expected by both Parties and peoples."

During his five-day visit to Cuba Nguyễn Phú Trọng headed a delegation consisting of such high-level officials as Phạm Quang Nghị, Nguyễn Thiện Nhân and Phạm Bình Minh among others. During his visit, Nguyễn Phú Trọng received the Order of José Marti, the highest distinction given by the Cuban Council of State. Before leaving, Nguyễn Phú Trọng said Vietnam would donate 5,000 tons of rice on behalf of the Vietnamese people to Cuba. The delegation was sent off by José Ramón Balaguer, a member of the Secretariat of the Communist Party of Cuba, at the José Martí International Airport. In the aftermath of Nguyễn Phú Trọng visit to Cuba, Victor Gaute Lopez, a member of the Secretariat, said Cuba and Vietnam would work side-to-side in their goal to construct a socialist society. Following Raúl Castro's July 2012 visit, Cuban–Vietnamese relations are said to have entered a new phase. According to Castro, the "Cuban people will forever be side by side with its Vietnamese peers to nurture the brotherhood between the two nations so that it will continue to grow and flourish. I believe that is the wish of both peoples." Nguyễn Phú Trọng shared his sentiments, and said "The [Castro's] visit promotes a new development in the relations between the two Parties, and Governments, and the realization of recently signed joint agreements and declarations. Vietnam has pledged to promote economic and trade measures that match the new circumstances and interests of each country." Nguyễn Sinh Hùng, the Chairman of the National Assembly of Vietnam, urged for more direct cooperation with Cuba after Castro's visit, and established the Vietnamese–Cuban Parliamentary Friendship Group so as to "bring bilateral ties between both legislative bodies to a new level."

In 2025, to celebrate the 65th anniversary of bilateral ties establishment, Vietnam Red Cross Society successfully raised US$9.5 million of donations - surpassing the initial goal of more than $2.5 million - from the Vietnamese people to help Cuba overcome social difficulties. The successful campaign receives formal appreciation from Cuba diplomats and leaders.

== Trade ==
Vietnam is a political and economic ally of Cuba, and bilateral trade consists mostly of rice, textiles, footwear, computers, electronics, wood and coffee. Two-way trade between the countries was recorded at about $200 million US dollars per year. During his visit to Vietnam in October 2012, Marino Murillo, a Vice President of the Cuban Council of Ministers, expressed hope that Vietnam would support Cuba in further developing agricultural development, laying emphasis on the cultivation of food and industrial crops.

In November 2018, President of Cuba Miguel Díaz-Canel visited Vietnam as part of his first international tour after taking office and met with his Vietnamese counterpart Nguyễn Phú Trọng. Trade and financial agreements were signed between the two countries with the intention of boosting bilateral exchange.

== Defence ==
Joaquin Quintas Sola, the Vice Minister of the Revolutionary Armed Forces, visited Hanoi on 18 September 2012 and met personally with Nguyễn Tấn Dũng, the Prime Minister of Vietnam. The Vietnamese Government stated it wished that cooperation in the field of national cooperation, laying emphasis on military technology, army building and officer training, would increase.

== Updating the Cuban model ==
In recent years, under the rule of Raúl Castro, the Communist Party of Cuba has tried to update the Cuban socialist model by introducing private ownership and entrepreneurship. Nguyễn Phú Trọng, the General Secretary of the Central Committee of the Communist Party of Vietnam, visited the Cuban capital of Havana in April 2012, while Raúl Castro visited Vietnam in July of the same year. During his visit to Vietnam, Castro told Trương Tấn Sang that it was a great honour to be able to visit Vietnam again. In June 2017, Esteban Lazo Hernández, President of the National Assembly of People's Power, to discuss further strengthening economic cooperation.

Marino Murillo, a Vice President of Cuba and the man in charge of the implementation of the Cuban economic reforms, visited Vietnam in October 2012. During his visit, Murillo met with General Secretary Nguyễn Phú Trọng, and other high-level officials such as Nguyen Van Dua, Deputy Secretary of the Ho Chi Minh City Party Committee, and Nguyễn Xuân Phúc, a Deputy Prime Minister. The point of the visit was to learn from the Vietnamese reform experience and the socialist-oriented market economy in general. In particular, Murillo was interested in how to establish single member limited liability companies and to learn from Ho Chi Minh City's experience in accelerating the equitisation of state-owned enterprises into public limited companies.
