= Four pillars (Vietnam) =

Highest offices in Vietnamese politics

The current four pillars in Vietnamese politics

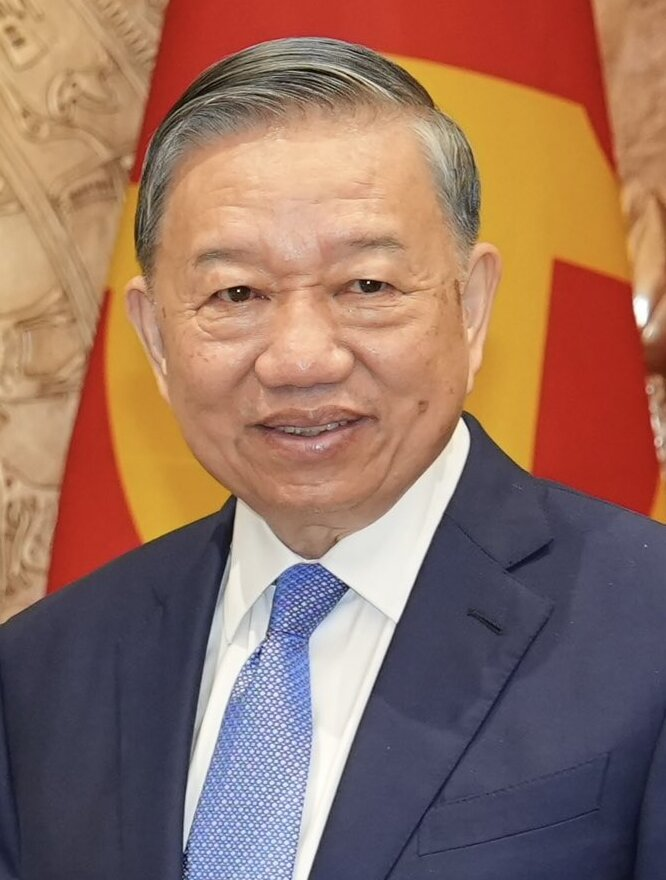
Party General Secretary and State President (Tô Lâm)

Prime Minister (Lê Minh Hưng)

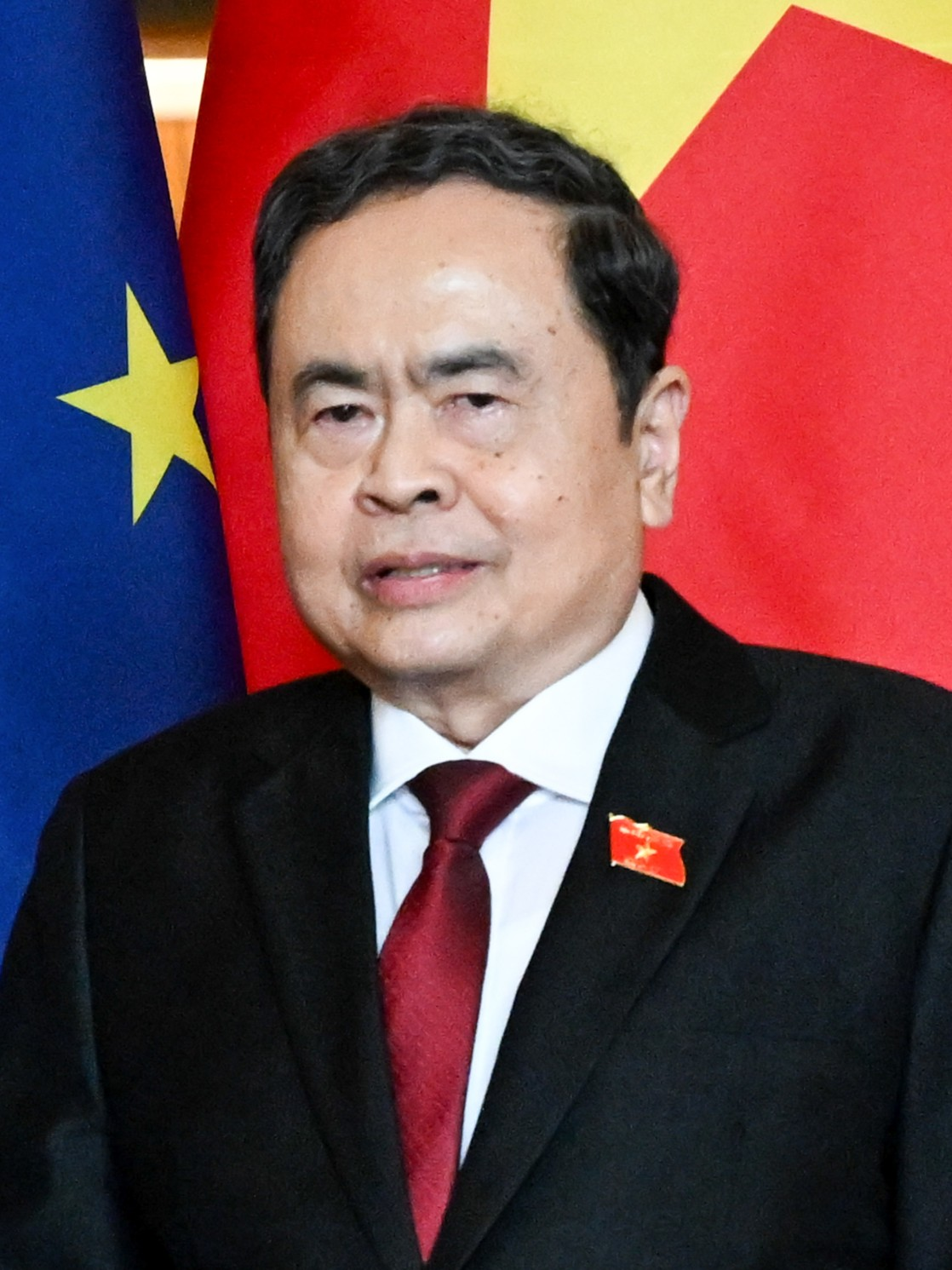
Chairman of the National Assembly (Trần Thanh Mẫn)

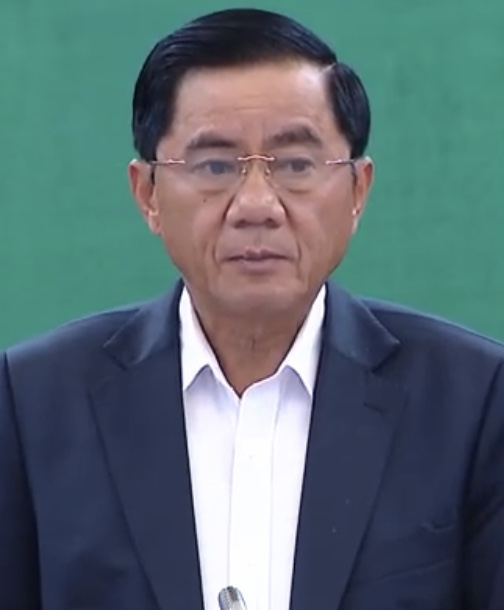
Standing member of the Secretariat (Trần Cẩm Tú)

The four pillars (Vietnamese: tứ trụ, or bộ tứ), also known as five pillars (ngũ trụ / bộ ngũ), are the most important party-state positions in the Communist Party of Vietnam and the government of Vietnam: the General Secretary of the Communist Party of Vietnam, President of Vietnam, Prime Minister of Vietnam, Chairman of the National Assembly of Vietnam, and the Permanent Member of the Secretariat. Together, they are officially designated as the "Key Leaders of the Party and the State" (Vietnamese: Lãnh đạo chủ chốt của Đảng và Nhà nước) and can be considered as the de facto highest state leaders. Similar to China, there does not exist an official order of precedence for political leaders and rather they are inferred in a de facto fashion. However, since the chairmanship of the Communist Party was abolished, the General Secretary has been the highest ranking official in Vietnam. This division of power is formed to prevent dictatorial rule and preserve consensus-based leadership, which is officially called by the Vietnamese Communist Party as "democratic centralism". In 2025, the seat of Permanent Member of the Secretariat of CPV was designated as the fifth "key leader", virtually becoming the fifth pillar of the Vietnamese politics.

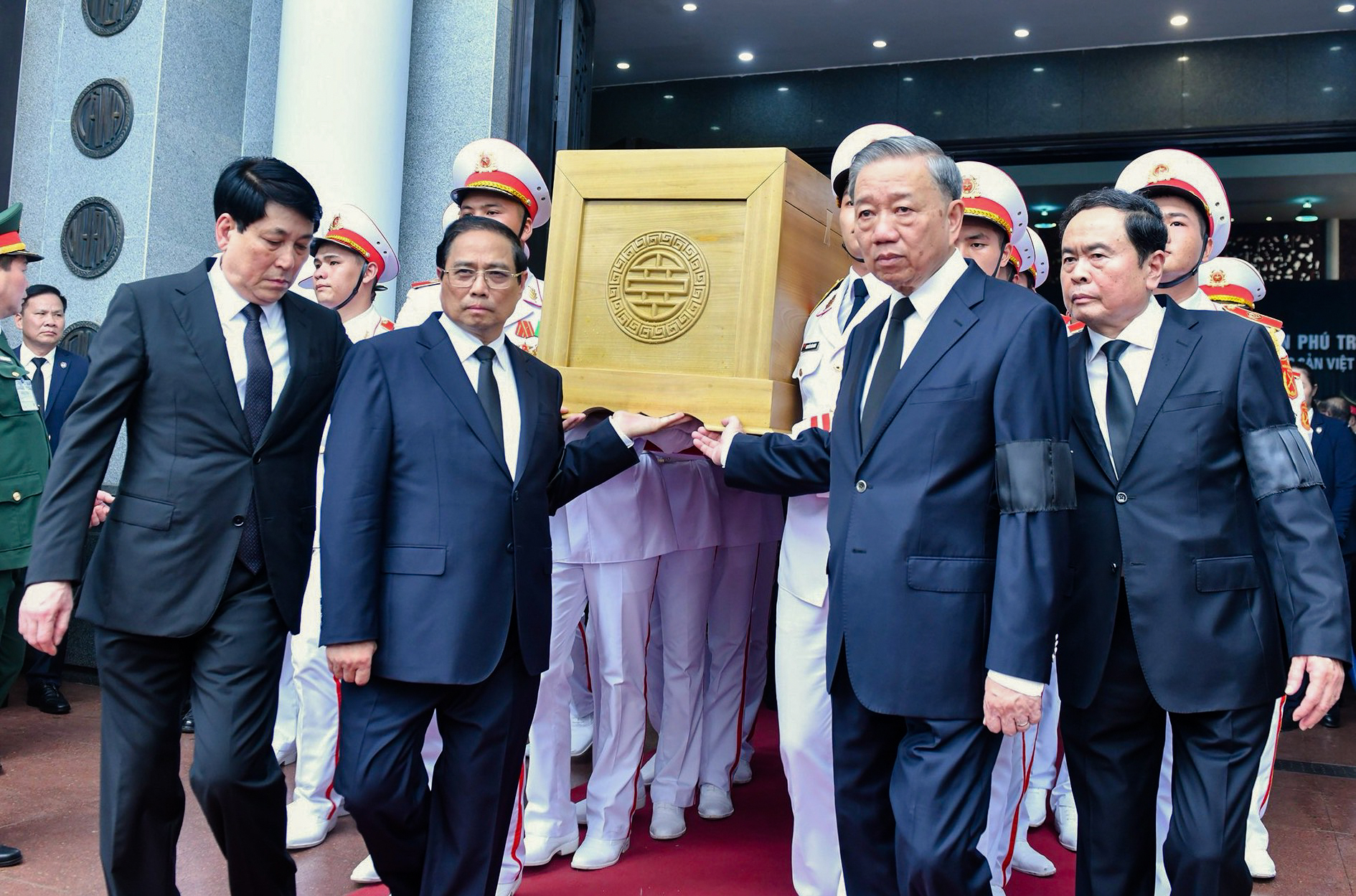
The 2025 "four pillars" of Vietnam, during the state funeral of Party General Secretary Nguyễn Phú Trọng.

Unlike other communist states, the General Secretary of the party (or any historically-equivalent designations) and the President of the state were largely occupied not by the same person, demonstrating the collective leadership in Vietnam. The only exceptions are: Hồ Chí Minh (1951–69), Trường Chinh (briefly in 1986), Nguyễn Phú Trọng (2018–21), and Tô Lâm (2024 and since 2026), and except Hồ Chí Minh and Tô Lâm, all of those exceptions were largely elected to fulfill their successors' uncompleted terms of party general secretaryship or state presidency. Thus, the Party General Secretaries rarely held offices that are nominally within the Vietnamese state apparatus and government except their parliament memberships, however is still managed to be the practical highest leader in the politics of Vietnam and is ideologically the highest commander of the People's Army of Vietnam, due to the ex officio occupation of the Secretaryship of the Party Central Military Commission. However, in 2026, Tô Lâm was unanimously re-elected as the President of Vietnam despite having been previously appointed as the CPV General Secretary by the 14th National Party Congress, on his way to become the first leader to be responsible for both roles for the full term since Ho Chi Minh, and practically restoring the four pillars.

== See also ==
- Politburo Standing Committee of the Chinese Communist Party
- Presidium of the Politburo of the Workers' Party of Korea
