= Nguyễn Văn Nên =

Vietnamese politician

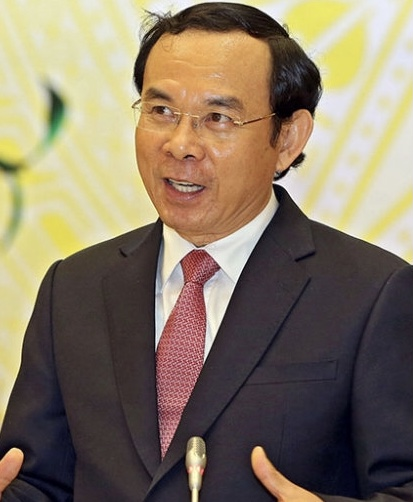

Secretary of the Ho Chi Minh City Party Committee
- In office 17 October 2020 – 25 August 2025
- General Secretary: Nguyễn Phú Trọng; Tô Lâm
- Preceded by: Nguyễn Thiện Nhân
- Succeeded by: Trần Lưu Quang

Chief of Office of Party Central Committee
- In office 4 February 2016 – 11 October 2020
- General Secretary: Nguyễn Phú Trọng
- Preceded by: Trần Quốc Vượng
- Succeeded by: Lê Minh Hưng

Minister of Government Office
- In office 14 November 2013 – 8 April 2016
- Prime Minister: Nguyễn Tấn Dũng
- Preceded by: Vũ Đức Đam
- Succeeded by: Mai Tiến Dũng

Personal details
- Born: 14 July 1957 (age 69) Gò Dầu, Tây Ninh, South Vietnam
- Party: Communist Party of Vietnam

Nguyễn Văn Nên (Vietnamese pronunciation: [ŋwiən˦ˀ˥ van˧˧ nen˧˧]; born 14 July 1957) is a Vietnamese politician who served as secretary of the Ho Chi Minh City Party Committee, since 2020 until 2025. He previously served as Chief of the Communist Party of Vietnam Central Committee Office in from February 2016. Prior to this, he was Minister-Chairman of the Government Office and Chairman of the Tay Ninh People's Committee.

== Career ==
Nên's administration faced criticism for its response to the COVID-19 pandemic in Ho Chi Minh City.
