= Bùi Thị Minh Hoài =

Vietnamese politician

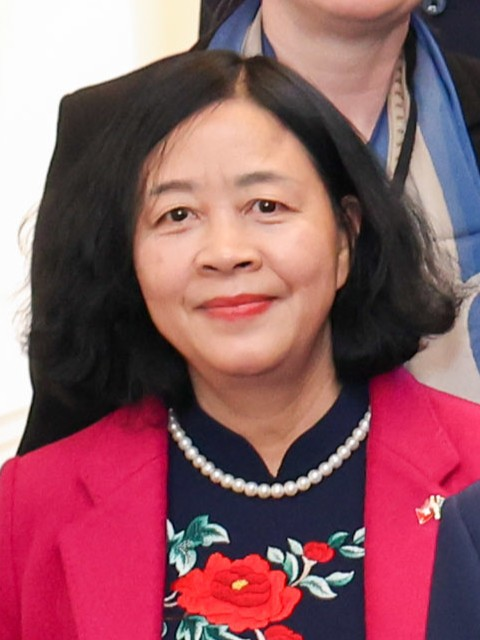
- Hoài during a state visit to Dublin c. 2024

Chairwoman of the Central Committee of Vietnamese Fatherland Front
- Incumbent
- Assumed office 7 November 2025
- Preceded by: Đỗ Văn Chiến

Secretary of Hanoi CPV Committee
- In office 17 July 2024 – 4 November 2025
- Preceded by: Đinh Tiến Dũng
- Succeeded by: Nguyễn Duy Ngọc

Head of the Central Mass Mobilisation Commission
- In office 8 April 2021 – 17 July 2025
- Preceded by: Trương Thị Mai
- Succeeded by: Mai Văn Chính

Vice Chair of the Central Inspection Commission of the CPV
- In office 19 January 2011 – 2 February 2021
- Chairman: Ngô Văn Dụ; Trần Quốc Vượng; Trần Cẩm Tú

Personal details
- Born: 12 January 1965 (age 61) Ha Nam, Vietnam
- Party: Communist Party of Vietnam (since 1991)

Bùi Thị Minh Hoài (born January 12, 1965) is a Vietnamese politician who serves as chairwoman of the Vietnamese Fatherland Front. She is the first woman to ever hold this position.

== Political career ==
=== Local governments ===
Hoai joined the Communist Party of Vietnam (CPV) on 19 January 1991. She started her political career in 1988 as an inspector at local government levels in Nam Định and Hà Nam. Hoài held positions between 1998 and 2009, including deputy head of the provincial Party Committee's inspection committee; head of the provincial Party Committee's mass mobilization committee; and Secretary of Phủ Lý's Party Committee. In May 2024, she succeeded Đinh Tiến Dũng as the Secretary of Hanoi CPV Committee via a byelection. Hoài was re-elected to the role in October 2025. She stepped down from this position the following month after being appointed as the chairwoman of the Vietnam Fatherland Front.

=== Positions within central CPV ===
With her background as an inspector, Hoai's first position within central level CPV was as Vice Chair of the Central Inspection Commission of the Communist Party of Vietnam, a role she held between 2011 and 2021. She was elected as an alternate member of the 10th Central Committee of the Communist Party of Vietnam from 2008 to 2011. Hoài became a full member of the 11th Central Committee and has been re-elected to 3 subsequent committees. She was elected to her party's 13th Politburo in a byelection in July 2024 and was re-elected to the 14th Politburo of the Communist Party of Vietnam in January 2026.
