= Đỗ Văn Chiến =

Vietnamese politician

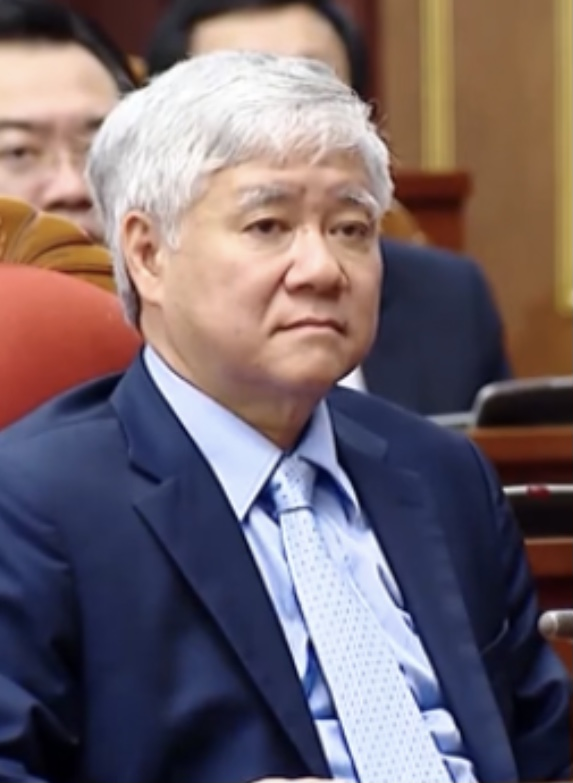
- Chiến in 2021

Permanent Vice Chairman of the National Assembly of Vietnam
- Incumbent
- Assumed office 11 November 2025
- Chairman: Trần Thanh Mẫn
- Preceded by: Trần Thanh Mẫn

Chairman of the Central Committee of Vietnamese Fatherland Front
- In office 12 April 2021 – 7 November 2025
- Preceded by: Trần Thanh Mẫn
- Succeeded by: Bùi Thị Minh Hoài

Minister, Chairman of the Ethnic Committee
- In office 9 April 2016 – 7 April 2021
- Prime Minister: Nguyễn Xuân Phúc
- Preceded by: Giàng Seo Phử
- Succeeded by: Hầu A Lềnh

Deputy Minister, Vice Chairman of the Ethnic Committee
- In office 27 January 2015 – 8 April 2016
- Minister, Chairman: Giàng Seo Phử

Party Secretary of Yên Bái Province
- In office 17 August 2011 – 26 February 2015
- Preceded by: Đào Ngọc Dung
- Succeeded by: Phạm Duy Cường

Chairman of People's Committee of Tuyên Quang Province
- In office June, 2009 – 16 August 2011
- Preceded by: Nguyễn Sáng Vang
- Succeeded by: Chẩu Văn Lâm

Personal details
- Born: 10 November 1962 (age 63) Tuyên Quang province, North Vietnam
- Party: Communist Party of Vietnam

Đỗ Văn Chiến (Vietnamese pronunciation: [ʔɗo˦ˀ˥ van˧˧ t͡ɕiən˧˦]; born 10 November 1962) is a Vietnamese politician. He is currently serving as a Permanent Vice Chairman of the National Assembly of Vietnam.

In May 2024, he joined the Politburo of the Communist Party.

== Early life ==
Do Van Chien was born on 10 November 1962, his hometown is Ninh Lai commune, Son Duong district, Tuyen Quang province. He has ethnic Sán Dìu ancestry. He currently resides in Tay Ho district, Hanoi.
