= Trần Lưu Quang =

Vietnamese politician

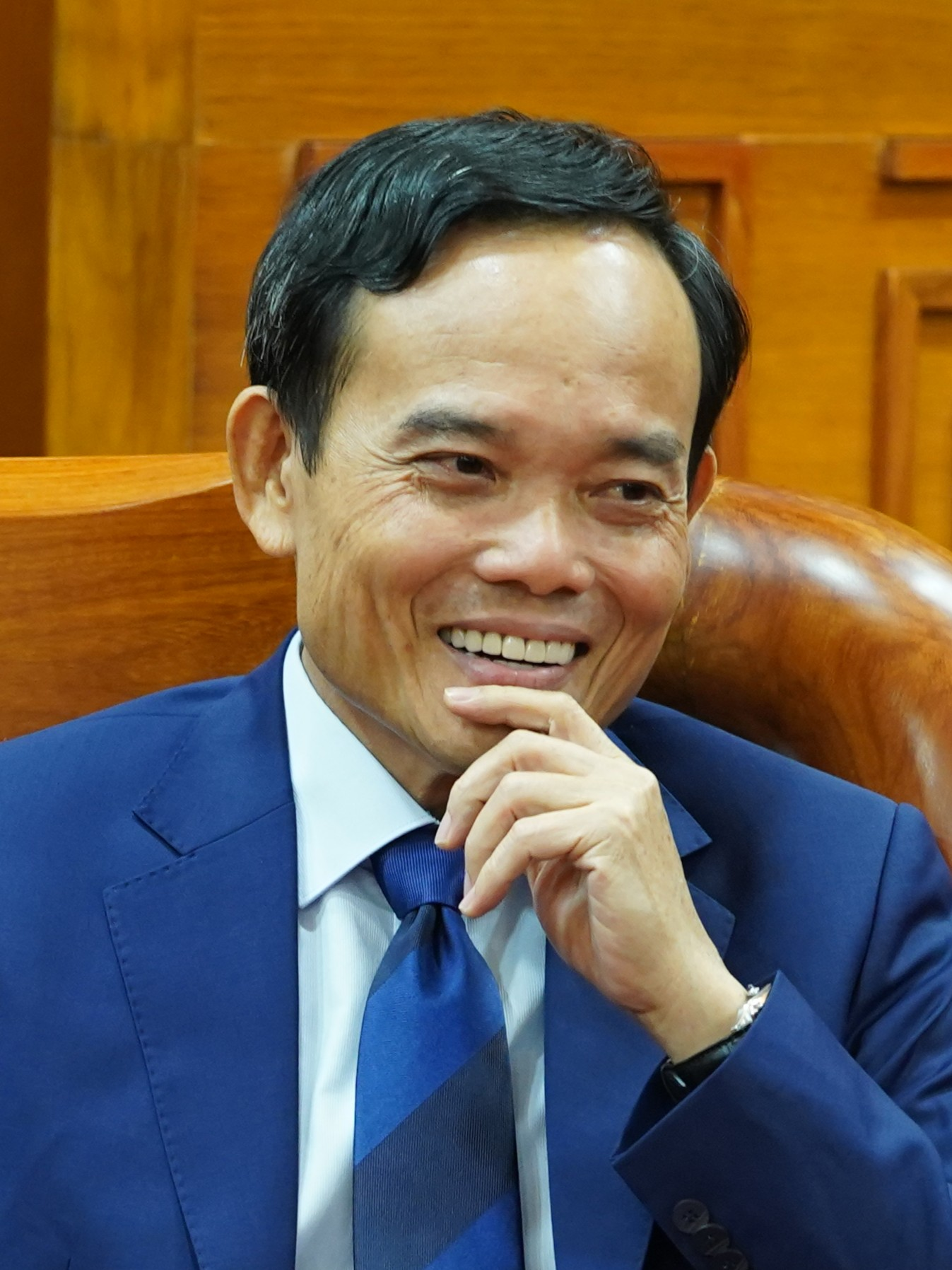
- Quang in 2026

Party Secretary of Ho Chi Minh City
- Incumbent
- Assumed office 25 August 2025
- General Secretary: Tô Lâm
- Preceded by: Nguyễn Văn Nên

Head of Central Policy and Strategy Commission
- In office 21 August 2024 – 25 August 2025
- Preceded by: Trần Tuấn Anh
- Succeeded by: Nguyễn Thanh Nghị

Deputy Prime Minister of Vietnam
- In office 5 January 2023 – 26 August 2024
- Prime Minister: Phạm Minh Chính
- Preceded by: Phạm Bình Minh
- Succeeded by: Bùi Thanh Sơn

Party Secretary of Hai Phong
- In office 4 May 2021 – 7 January 2023
- Preceded by: Lê Văn Thành
- Succeeded by: Lê Tiến Châu

Permanent Deputy Party Secretary of the Ho Chi Minh City
- In office 27 February 2019 – 4 June 2021
- Secretary: Nguyễn Thiện Nhân; Nguyễn Văn Nên
- Preceded by: Tất Thành Cang
- Succeeded by: Phan Văn Mãi

Party Secretary of Tây Ninh
- In office 31 July 2015 – 27 February 2019
- Preceded by: Võ Văn Phuông
- Succeeded by: Phạm Viết Thanh

Personal details
- Born: 30 August 1967 (age 59) Trảng Bàng, Tây Ninh Province, South Vietnam
- Party: Communist Party of Vietnam
- Website: chinhphu.vn

Trần Lưu Quang (Vietnamese pronunciation: [ʈəŋ˨˩ lɨw˧˧ waːŋ˧˧]; born 30 August 1967) is a Vietnamese politician. A member of the 13th Central Committee of the Communist Party, he is currently secretary of the Ho Chi Minh City Party Committee, the city's highest political office, since 2025.

He is a member of the 15th National Assembly of Vietnam and held several leadership positions prior to becoming vice premier. He served as Party secretary (de facto governor) for Tay Ninh, First Deputy Party Secretary (de facto deputy mayor) for Ho Chi Minh City, Party Secretary for Hai Phong City, one of the four Deputy Prime Ministers of Vietnam in the cabinet of Phạm Minh Chính and head of Central Policy, Strategy Commission of the Communist Party of Vietnam.
