= San Diu people =

Ethnic group in Vietnam

Sán Dìu people
山由族 Người Sán Dìu (𠊛山由)

Total population
- 183,004

Regions with significant populations
- Northern Vietnam

Languages
- Sán Dìu; Vietnamese

Religion
- Predominantly Mahayana Buddhism; Taoism; Catholicism; Evangelicalism

Related ethnic groups
- Hoa people (Chinese Vietnamese); Yao people

The Sán Dìu (also known as San Deo, Trai, Trai Dat and Man Quan Coc; Chinese: 山由族; pinyin: Shān yóu zú; Jyutping: saan1 jau4 zuk6; Cantonese Yale: Sanyau Juk; Chữ nôm: 𠊛山由; Vietnamese alphabet: Người Sán Dìu) are an ethnic group in northern Vietnam who predominantly speak the Sán Dìu language, a Yue Chinese variety. They are believed to have migrated from the Liangguang region of modern-day China around the 15th century.

== Overview ==
The group's estimated population as of 2000 was 117,500; the 2019 census put the number at 183,004. They speak a variant of Yue Chinese, and it is suggested that some still speak Iu Mien. The major religions are Mahayana Buddhism and Taoism, with elements of animism and veneration of the dead. About 400 are adherents of the Catholic Church; a few are evangelical Protestants. This ethnic group is mainly concentrated around the Tam Đảo range in Thái Nguyên Province.

== See also ==
- List of ethnic groups in Vietnam
- Hoa people
- Ngái people, a Hakka speaking community in Vietnam
