= Trần Thanh Mẫn =

Vietnamese politician

His Excellency Trần Thanh Mẫn
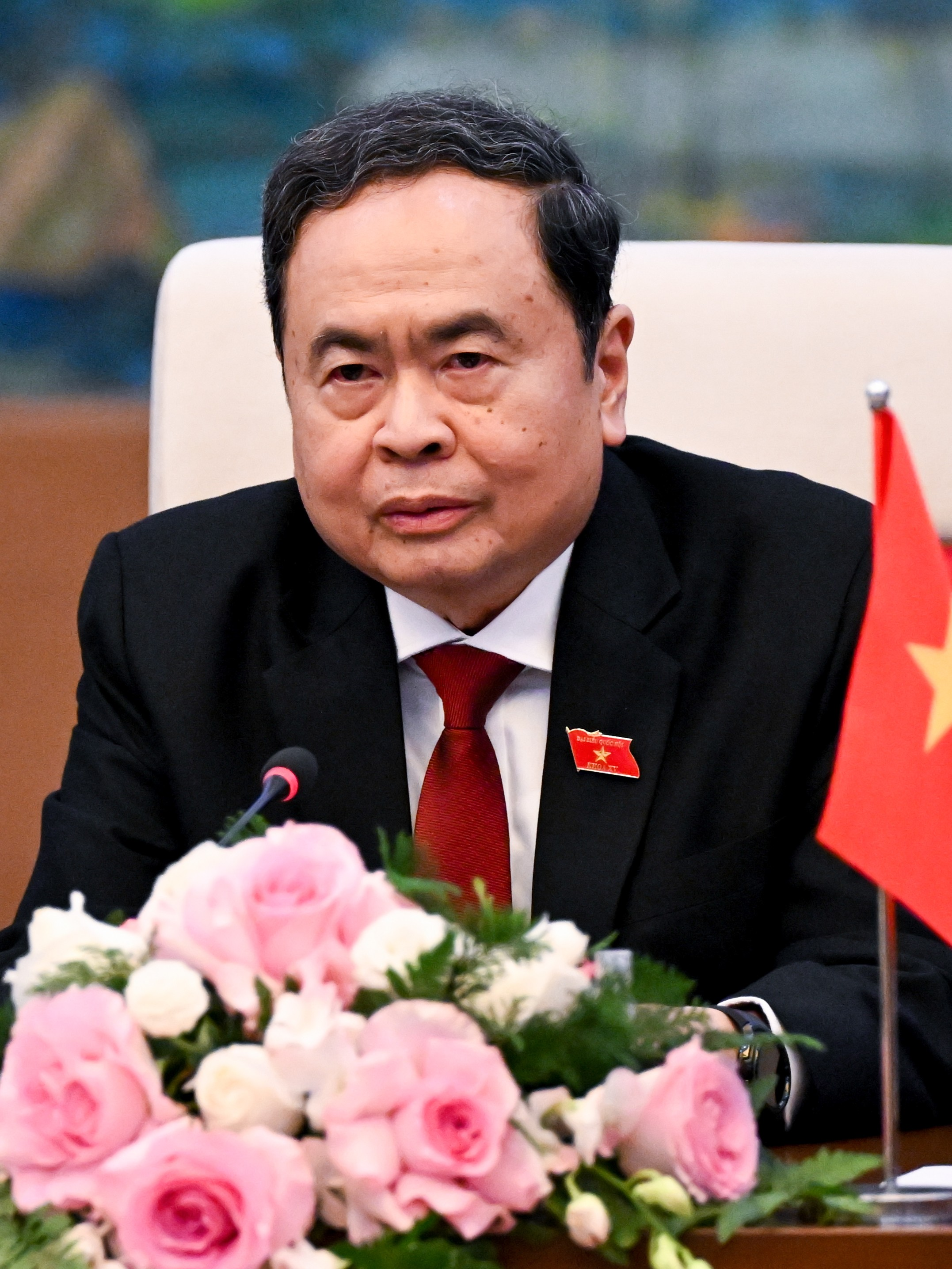
- Mẫn in 2026

13th Chairman of the National Assembly of Vietnam
- Incumbent
- Assumed office 20 May 2024; Acting: 2–20 May 2024
- Vice Chairman: Đỗ Văn Chiến
- Preceded by: Vương Đình Huệ

Vice Chairman of the National Assembly of Vietnam
- In office 1 April 2021 – 20 May 2024
- Chairman: Vương Đình Huệ; Himself (acting)
- Preceded by: Tòng Thị Phóng
- Succeeded by: Đỗ Văn Chiến (10/11/2025)

Chairman of the Central Committee of Vietnamese Fatherland Front
- In office 22 June 2017 – 12 April 2021
- Preceded by: Nguyễn Thiện Nhân
- Succeeded by: Đỗ Văn Chiến

Personal details
- Born: 12 August 1962 (age 64) Hau Giang, South Vietnam
- Party: Communist Party of Vietnam (1982–present)
- Spouse: Nguyễn Thị Thanh Nga
- Education: University of Economics Ho Chi Minh City; Ho Chi Minh State Academy of Political Sciences

Trần Thanh Mẫn (Vietnamese pronunciation: [t͡ɕən˨˩ tʰajŋ̟˧˧ mən˦ˀ˥]; born 12 August 1962) is a Vietnamese politician who has been the 13th chairman of the National Assembly of Vietnam since May 2024. Following the resignation of Vương Đình Huệ, Mẫn was "assigned to manage National Assembly activities" until a new chairman is elected by the legislature. He is also a member of the Politburo of the Communist Party of Vietnam. On 20 May, he was elected the Chairman of the National Assembly.

== Early life ==
Tran Thanh Man was born on 12 August 1962, his hometown is Thanh Xuan commune, Chau Thanh A district, Hau Giang province. He currently resides at 81B, Nguyen Trai Street, Tan A Ward, Ninh Kieu District, Can Tho City.

During his youth, he attended high school in his hometown. After the country was unified, he graduated from general education: December 12. He attended university majoring in Business Administration, was a graduate student in economics, successfully defended his PhD thesis in Economics and received his PhD in Economics in November 2009. During his career working for the Party and State country, he studied and received political training at the Ho Chi Minh National Academy of Politics majoring in Politics, receiving a Bachelor's degree in Political Theory.

Tran Thanh Man was admitted to the Communist Party of Vietnam on 25 August 1982, officially became a party member on 25 August 1983.

== National Assembly ==
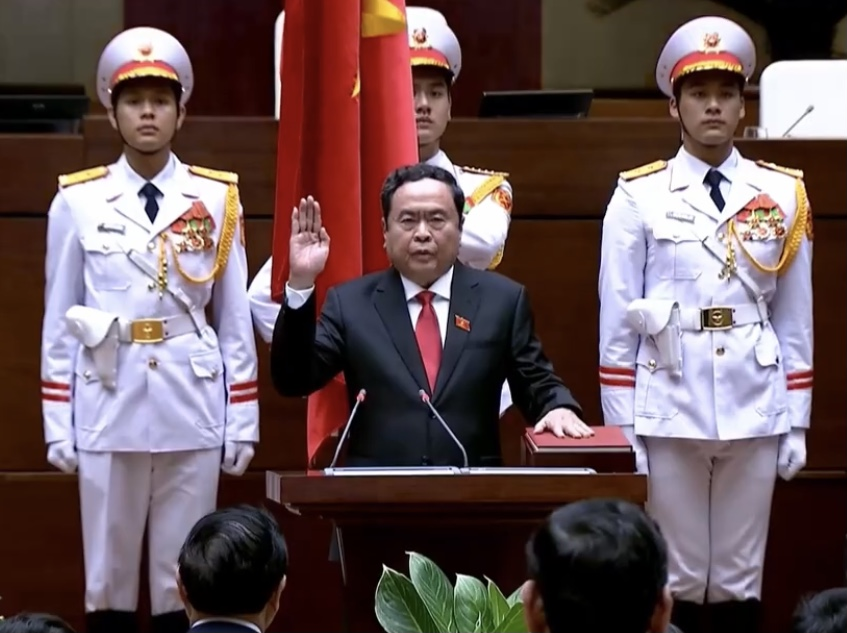
Mẫn being shown in as Chairman of the National Assembly on 20 May 2024

On 1 April 2021, continuing the program of the 11th session of the 14th National Assembly, the National Assembly conducted procedures to elect a number of National Assembly Vice Chairmen. Delegates passed a resolution to elect Trần Thanh Mẫn as Standing Vice Chairman of the National Assembly with an approval rate of 94.79%. He takes on a new role, as Permanent Vice Chairman of the National Assembly of Vietnam, under the authority of Chairman of the National Assembly Vương Đình Huệ.

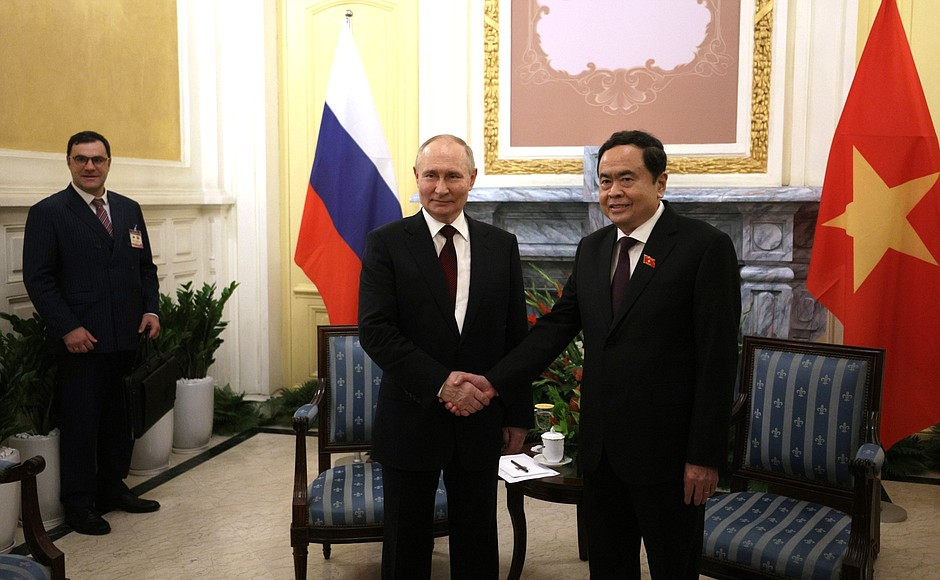
Mẫn with Russian President Vladimir Putin on 20 June 2024

On 2 May 2024, in Hanoi, the 15th National Assembly held its seventh extraordinary session to consider personnel work under its authority. Immediately after the National Assembly dismissed the Chairman of the 15th National Assembly for the 2021-2026 term, Vương Đình Huệ due to his officials' involvement in the Infringement case at Thuận An Group. The National Assembly Standing Committee assigned Trần Thanh Mẫn, Politburo member, Standing Vice Chairman of the National Assembly to manage the activities of the National Assembly Standing Committee and the National Assembly of the Socialist Republic of Vietnam for until the position of Chairman of the 15th National Assembly is completed according to regulations.

On 18 May 2024, at the 9th Central Conference, Mẫn was introduced by the Central Committee to be elected Chairman of the National Assembly and will be elected on 20 May 2024 at the opening ceremony of the 7th session in 15th Vietnam National Assembly.
