= 12th Central Committee of the Communist Party of Vietnam =

2016–2021 electoral term

12th Central Committee
- Symbol of the Communist Party of Vietnam

27 January 2016 – 31 January 2021 (5 years, 4 days) Overview
- Type: Political-executive organ
- Election: 12th National Congress
- Length of term: Five years

Leadership
- General Secretary: Nguyễn Phú Trọng
- Permanent Member: Trần Quốc Vượng (2018–21); Đinh Thế Huynh (2016–18)
- Politburo: 19 members
- Secretariat: 14 members
- Inspection organ: 29 members

Members
- Total: 180 members
- Newcomers: 81 members (12th)
- Old: 81 members (11th)
- Reelected: 103 members (13th)
- Removed: 5 members

Alternates
- Total: 20 alternates
- Newcomers: 17 alternates (12th)
- Old: 3 alternates (11th)
- Reelected: 16 alternates (13th)

Meeting place
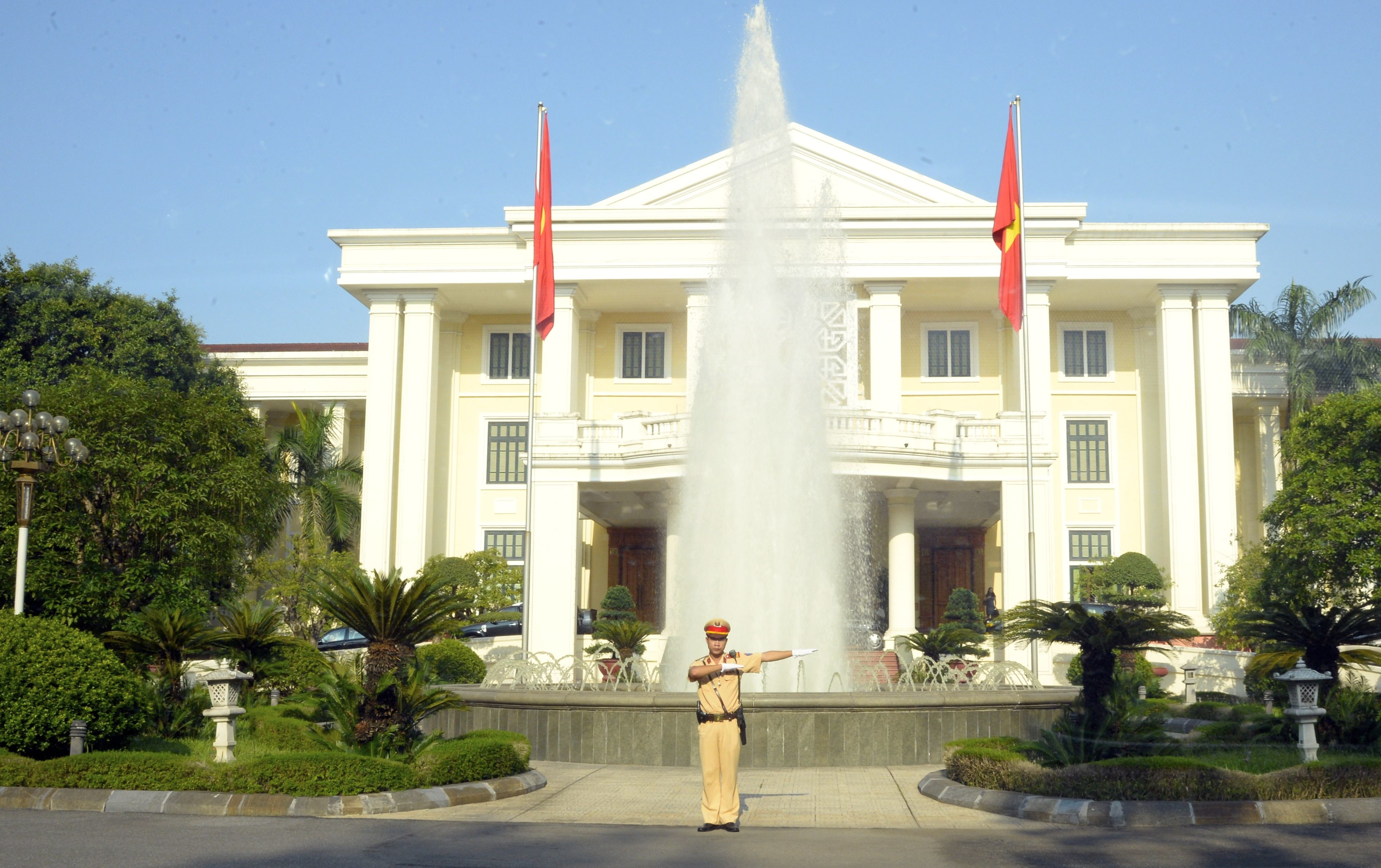
- Headquarters of the Party Central Committee; 1A, Hùng Vương, Phường Điện Biên, Quận Ba Đình, Hà Nội

Charter
- Charter of the Communist Party of Vietnam

Website
- dangcongsan.vn

The 12th Central Committee (12th CC), officially stylised as XII Central Committee of the Communist Party of Vietnam (CPV), was composed of 180 members and 20 alternates. It was elected by the 12th National Congress on 27 January 2016, and its electoral term lasted until the 13th National Congress' election, of the 13th Central Committee on 31 January 2021. The Central Committee, as the Party's highest decision-making body in the given period, was not a permanent body and convened for fifteen meetings, which lasted for a combined total of 66 days. At its 1st Plenary Session on 27 January 2016, the CC elected the general secretary of the 12th CC, the 12th Politburo, the 12th Secretariat, and the 12th Central Inspection Commission (CIC), as well as the chairman of the 12th CIC. These elected officials and bodies oversaw the day-to-day work of the Central Committee and its apparatus.

Despite being older than the formal age limit, Nguyễn Phú Trọng was reelected for a second term as CPV general secretary, the highest party office. His term and the 12th CC were marked by a nationwide anti-corruption campaign, commonly called "blazing furnace", which began in 2013. The campaign's intensity increased during the 12th term as it began to indict retired, incumbent, and senior leaders at all levels of governance. Eleven members of the 12th CC were disciplined, with punishments ranging from a warning to expulsion from the Party. There was also a struggle for succession taking place during this electoral term, with most observers believing that Nguyễn Phú Trọng favoured Trần Quốc Vượng as his successor. However, Trần Quốc Vượng failed to garner support, and Nguyễn Phú Trọng was reelected to a third term by the 1st Plenary Session of the 13th CC.

The 12th CC discussed and adopted strategies and plans for economic development, economic reforms, political reforms, and foreign policy issues. Furthermore, it elected and held to account the Politburo, the Secretariat and the CIC, and organised a motion of no confidence on all members of the Politburo. It also suggested candidates for state offices, such as the president, the prime minister, and the chair of the National Assembly of Vietnam amongst others, to the National Assembly. Beginning with the 8th plenum in 2018, the 12th CC began preparing for the 13th National Congress. It established sub-committees to draft congress documents and discussed them at plenary sessions. It also began gathering candidates to stand for office in the 13th CC, 13th Politburo, 13th Secretariat, and the 13th CIC.

== Background and composition ==
The 12th National Congress convened from 20 to 28 January 2016, at the Vietnam National Convention Center for the purpose of voting on reports, resolutions, and the composition of the 12th Central Committee (CC). On 26 January, the congress delegates conducted a vote regarding the list of nominees presented by the 11th CC for the positions of members and alternates of the 12th CC. Scholar Alexander L. Vuving characterised the 12th Congress as "especially partisan" in comparison to previous congresses and deduced that it represented a choice between Party General Secretary Nguyễn Phú Trọng and then-Prime Minister Nguyễn Tấn Dũng. Although numerous external analysts, including Vuving, Jonathan London, and Le Long Hiep, anticipated that Nguyễn Tấn Dũng would prevail in the power struggle, the 12th National Congress did not elect him to the 12th CC. Lê Quỳnh from BBC Vietnam remarked that both Nguyễn Tấn Dũng, aged 66, and Nguyễn Phú Trọng, aged 71, exceeded the stipulated age limit set by party regulations, which established a retirement age of 65 for the position of general secretary. Nonetheless, this age requirement is subject to negotiation among the various factions within the party. Political scientist Phuong Nguyen posited that the reelection of Nguyễn Phú Trọng, through his three fundamental principles of restoring party authority, mitigating corruption, and reinforcing party oversight of Đổi Mới—an all-encompassing term denoting reform and development—established the political tone and direction of the 12th Central Committee.

The 12th CC comprised 180 members with voting rights and 20 alternates without voting rights. Members and alternates occupied key positions in the country, from the President of Vietnam to the President of the Vietnam Women's Union's Central Committee. Seventeen out of the one hundred eighty members, and three out of the twenty alternates were women. This represented a slight increase in female representation compared to the 11th term. Regarding age, nineteen members were below the age of forty-five, with Nguyễn Thanh Nghị and Nguyễn Xuân Anh (both born in 1976) being the youngest among them. Nguyễn Phú Trọng, born in 1944, was the oldest individual elected to the 12th CC. Four individuals elected as alternates were under the age of forty, with the youngest, Lê Quốc Phong, serving as the first secretary of the Central Committee of the Hồ Chí Minh Communist Youth Union, being thirty-eight years old at the time of his election. Institutionally, the Ministry of National Defence had the highest number of representatives, with twenty-two officials having been elected to the 12th CC. The Ministry of Public Security, conversely, was represented by five members. No one from the Ministry of Health was elected to the CC. Sixteen members of the incumbent Government were not elected; however, these individuals had all attained the retirement age stipulated by governmental regulations and were scheduled to vacate their positions by mid-2016 before.

== Plenary sessions ==
=== 2016 ===
==== 1st Plenary: Election of the central leading organs (27 January) ====
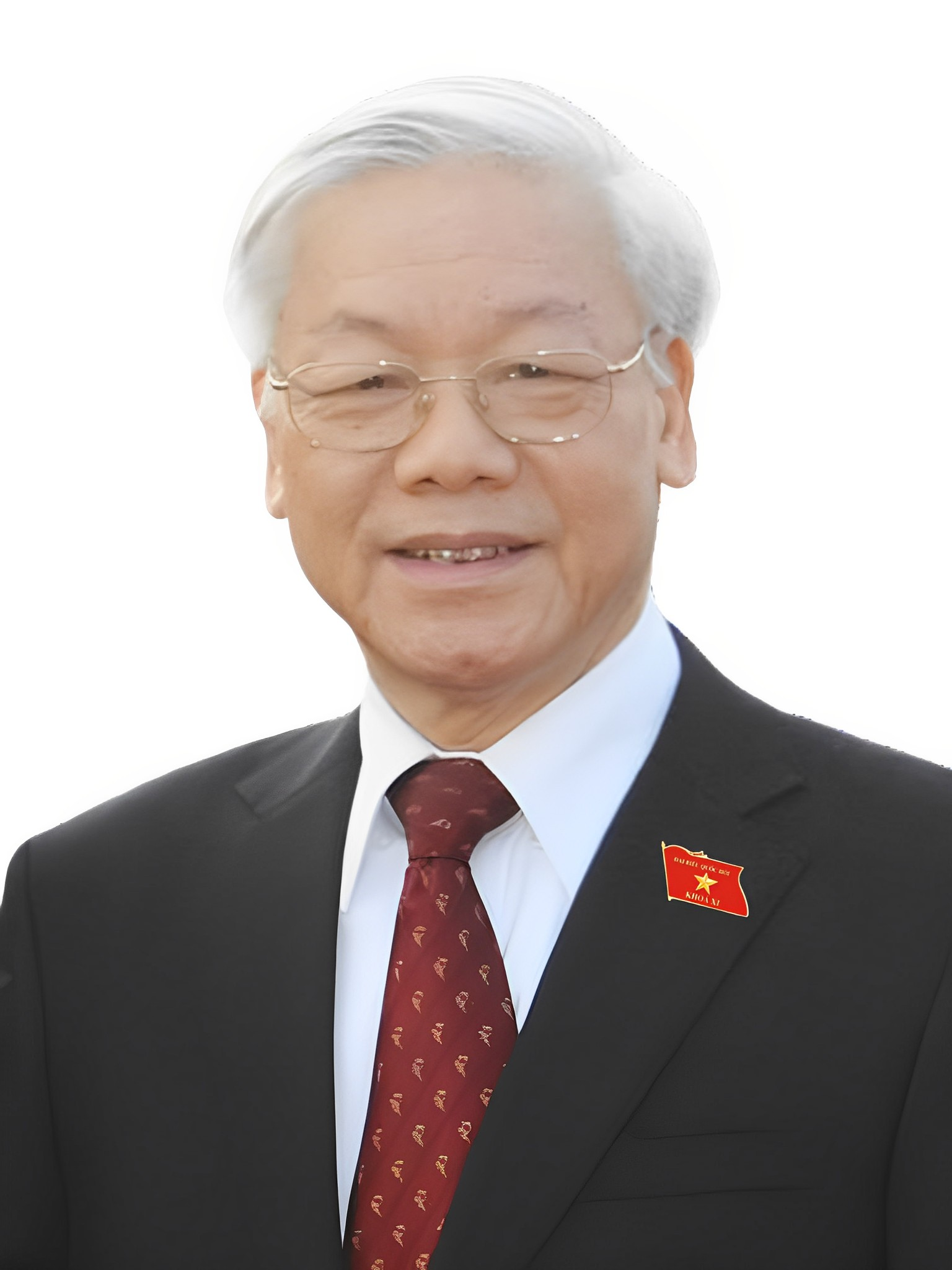
The 1st Plenary Session reelected Nguyễn Phú Trọng as General Secretary of the Central Committee.

After being elected on 26 January 2016, the 12th CC convened for its 1st Plenary Session on 27 January 2016 at the Headquarters of the Party Central Committee in Hanoi during the 12th National Congress. It elected the 12th Politburo, the 12th Central Inspection Commission (CIC), three members of the 12th Secretariat, the CIC chairman and the CC general secretary. Nguyễn Phú Trọng, in his capacity as the general secretary of the 11th CC, presided over the 1st Plenary Session of the newly-elected Central Committee. The session proceeded to reelect Nguyễn Phú Trọng as general secretary, elect Trần Quốc Vượng as chairman of the Central Inspection Commission, and to elect a 19-member Politburo, a 21-member CIC, as well as three additional members of the Secretariat. Asked about his reelection, Nguyễn Phú Trọng stated, "I did not expect the Congress to introduce and elect me to the Central Committee. Then, the First Plenary Session elected me to the post of general secretary with almost 100% absolute votes. I was surprised because my age was advanced while my health and qualifications were limited. I also asked for leave, but the Party assigned me the task, and I had to comply." The election results were promulgated to the congress delegates on the morning of 28 January by Đinh Thế Huynh, on behalf of the Presidium of the 12th National Congress. He apprised them that the electoral process was conducted in accordance with the CPV Charter and the Election Regulations of the 12th National Congress.

The 11th Central Committee put forth a list of 18 nominees for election to the 12th Politburo to the 12th National Congress and, indirectly, the 1st Plenary Session of the 12th CC. In addition to that list, the 1st Plenary Session elected Đinh La Thăng, thus expanding the size of the 12th Politburo to 19 members. The median age of the newly-elected Politburo was 59. Nguyễn Phú Trọng, aged 72, was the oldest member, whereas Võ Văn Thưởng, aged 46, was the youngest. Tòng Thị Phóng was the sole Politburo member with an ethnic minority background, being of Thai ethnicity. Furthermore, for the first time in its history, the Politburo had three female members (Nguyễn Thị Kim Ngân, Tòng Thị Phóng and Trương Thị Mai). Seven members had served in the 11th Politburo. Of the 19 members, three had served in the 11th Secretariat (Trương Hòa Bình, Ngô Xuân Lịch and Trần Quốc Vượng), two had served in the apparatus of the 11th Central Committee (Phạm Minh Chính and Vương Đình Huệ), five had served in government (Hoàng Trung Hải, Phạm Bình Minh, Nguyễn Văn Bình, Đinh La Thăng and Tô Lâm), one had led a committee of the 13th National Assembly of Vietnam (Trương Thị Mai) and one had served in local administration (Võ Văn Thưởng). Of the three members elected to the Secretariat at the plenum, none had served in the previous term.

Scholar Alexander Vuving observed that the election of Nguyễn Phú Trọng as general secretary has "surprised many observers." Rodion Ebbighausen, writing for Deutsche Welle, wrote that Nguyễn Phú Trọng's reelection was a victory by Marxist–Leninist forces and of collective leadership over Nguyễn Tấn Dũng's capitalist approach and his individualistic ethos. A report from BBC News shared Ebbighausen's analysis of conservatives versus reformers. It noted that Nguyễn Tấn Dũng was perceived as being friendly towards the United States, gaining domestic popularity for being viewed as the anti-China figure candidate. Scholar Jonathan London presented an alternative perspective on recent events, emphasising the ideological alignment of Nguyễn Phú Trọng with the Chinese Communist Party. According to London, Nguyễn Tấn Dũng was perceived as a maverick who endeavored to present himself as a proponent of a more democratic style of governance and a political reformer. In response, allies of Nguyễn Phú Trọng accused him of pursuing power solely for the sake of power and highlighted the corruption that thrived during his tenure in government. Conversely, Stratfor posited that it would be overly simplistic to reduce the narrative to a dichotomy between the pro-Chinese Nguyễn Phú Trọng and the pro-Western Nguyễn Tấn Dũng. They cited that Nguyễn Phú Trọng had endorsed several policies that provoked significant discontent with China.

==== 2nd Plenary: Economic planning and the 11th Session of the 13th National Assembly (10–12 March) ====
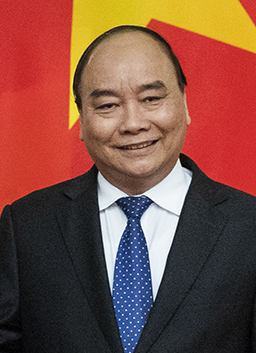
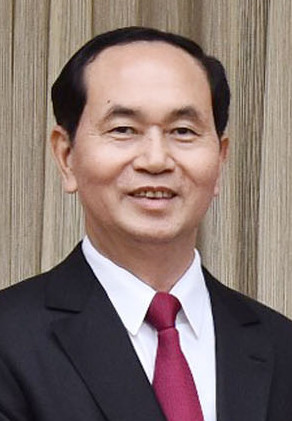
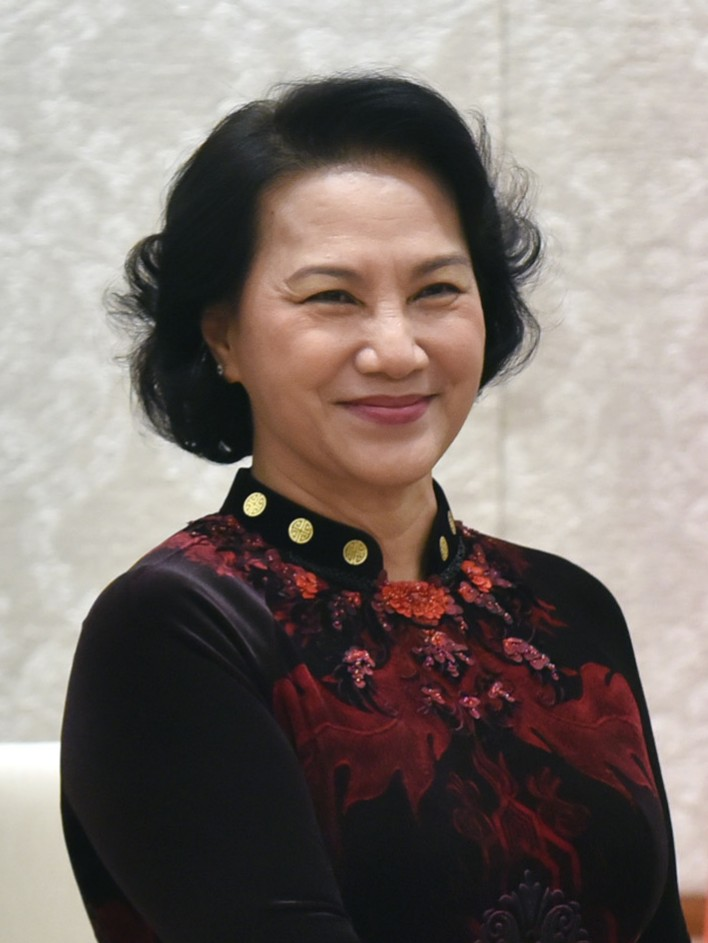
The 2nd Plenary Session adopted the Politburo's proposal on nominating Nguyễn Xuân Phúc (left), Trần Đại Quang (centre) and Nguyễn Thị Kim Ngân (right) as Prime Minister, President and Chair of the National Assembly, respectively.

On 10 March 2016, the 2nd Plenary Session was convened under the leadership of Nguyễn Phú Trọng, who delivered an opening address outlining the activities of the Politburo and the Secretariat since the 12th National Congress. He informed the session that the two organs had established a working agenda for 2016. In the same address, Nguyễn Phú Trọng advised the 12th Central Committee to adopt a working agenda that prioritises issues and tasks that enhance party governance, fortify the political system, mitigate political corruption, and combat bureaucratic inefficiencies. Furthermore, he expressed the hope that the plenary session would contribute to the implementation of the slogan calling for three strategic breakthroughs, which states that the CPV works to perfect the institutions of the socialist-oriented market economy, enhance human resources, and construct a synchronous infrastructure system.

On behalf of the Party Delegation to the Government, Deputy Prime Minister Nguyễn Xuân Phúc presented at the morning session of the second working day a report concerning the socio-economic development plan, Vietnam's official term for five-year plan and inspired by its Soviet namesake, and the mid-term financial and public investment plans, which is formulated by the Ministry of Finance alongside the Ministry of Planning and Investment to set objectives for the state budget and public finances, for the period 2016–2020. The plenary session endorsed the proposed the socio-economic development plan and consented to forward it to the 11th Session of the 13th National Assembly for ratification. The plan's details were not disclosed to the public until its adoption by the 13th National Assembly.

In contrast, the session notified the Politburo that the mid-term state finance budget and mid-term public investment plan proposals required further refinement before being submitted to the 13th National Assembly. It saw several issues with the proposal, and the session recommended that the plan further emphasise investment in agriculture, support for farmers, and development of rural areas. Additionally, it suggested revamping state administration and procedures, as well as strengthening the business environment. Additional concerns articulated encompassed excessive government expenditure, the challenges of public debt (and bad debt specifically), and the magnitude of public debt in light of the volatility observed in the global financial markets. Moreover, specific policies were proposed, such as addressing climate change by mitigating severe saltwater intrusion in the Mekong Delta, as well as pointing to the problems of drought in the South Central Coast and the Central Highlands. Further, environmental pollution and traffic congestion in urban centers and extensive metropolitan areas were also highlighted. Furthermore, the committee conveyed its desire for the annual, mid-term, and five-year socio-economic development plans not to contradict the resolutions of the 12th National Congress, and to be customised to the unique circumstances of each locality and sector. During these discussions, the session also proposed to the 12th Politburo the creation of action programmes to implement party-state policies and guidelines.

The meeting also deliberated on the nominations of personnel to serve in State agencies. The afternoon session held on 11 March was conducted by Đinh Thế Huynh, who presented a list of nominees for State agencies to be proposed at the 11th Session. Phạm Minh Chính, in his capacity as secretary of the Party Central Committee and head of the Organisation Commission, presented to the plenary session the Politburo's proposed list of nominees for state and government posts. Nguyễn Phú Trọng emphasised that, in light of the voting outcomes at the plenum, the Politburo would further refine the nomination list before submitting it to the National Assembly. Nevertheless, the session achieved a consensus regarding the candidates for the positions of president, prime minister and chair of the National Assembly. The 13th National Assembly's 11th Session was convened for 21 March – 12 April and appointed Nguyễn Xuân Phúc as Prime Minister, Trần Đại Quang as President and Nguyễn Thị Kim Ngân as the first female Chair of the National Assembly. In line with this discussion, the meeting also deliberated on the proposal from the Politburo concerning the proactive preparation of central-level officials to serve as candidates in the election of deputies to the 14th National Assembly. In his concluding remarks to the second session held on 12 March, Nguyễn Phú Trọng affirmed that the participants largely agreed with the draft working agenda for the 12th tenure, highlighting that it addresses significant matters essential for the successful implementation of the resolution ratified by the 12th National Congress.

==== 3rd Plenary: Draft Working Regulations and Personnel Matters (4–7 July) ====
The plenum convened on 4 July to deliberate on the following documents: "Regulations on the work of the Central Committee, the Politburo and the Secretariat", "Regulations on work of the Central Inspection Commission", "Regulations on the enforcement of the Party's Charter", "Regulations on party inspection, supervision and discipline; the appointment of personnel of state agencies", and "a number of other important issues". The plenary session thoroughly deliberated these regulations, as the 12th National Congress decided to establish distinct regulations instead of amending the party's existing framework charter.

In his inaugural address to the plenum, Nguyễn Phú Trọng emphasised that the proposed regulations constitute a realisation of the CPV’s Charter and are poised to significantly advance the promotion of democracy within the operations of the Central Committee, the Politburo, the Secretariat, and the Central Inspection Commission. Concurrently, Nguyễn Phú Trọng remarked these regulations sought to rigorously uphold party discipline, sustain collective leadership, and fortify individual responsibility, especially that of leaders. Additionally, the regulations were considered indispensable for strengthening the enforcement of the party charter, which, according to the central party leadership, was frequently violated by lower-level cadres. The primary objective of these regulations is to create a formal institutional framework that enforces the charter and elucidates the relationship between the individual and the collective. According to scholar Nguyen Manh Hung, the regulation on inspection work conferred upon the Central Inspection Commission the authority to supervise and audit the property declarations of cadres under the management of the Politburo and the Secretariat. It was the first time in the party's history that the CIC had received such a mandate. The session unanimously promulgated regulations for enforcing the Party's Charter, as well as those for party inspection, supervision, and discipline. It also adopted the working regulations of the Central Committee, Politburo, Secretariat, and the Central Inspection with a "high degree" of support.

On 6 July, the plenum convened under the leadership of Phạm Minh Chính to discuss the Politburo's proposal on candidates to serve in state agencies. The meeting did not reconsider the decisions made at the last plenum regarding personnel matters; instead, it discussed candidates for the remaining thirteen vacancies. Later in the afternoon, the participants of the plenum deliberated on the matter of imposing disciplinary actions against former Central Committee member Vũ Huy Hoàng and 12th CC member Trần Văn Nam. The plenum subsequently cast their votes in favour of disciplinary measures against them. On 7 July, the concluding day of the plenum, Phạm Minh Chính presented the Politburo's report assessing the proposals concerning personnel for leadership positions in State agencies, after which the attendees engaged in discussion regarding the content. Next on the agenda was the election of additional members to the 12th Central Inspection Commission, as proposed by the Politburo. The press release notes that "additional members" were elected but does not specify whom. Furthermore, the plenum reached a consensus regarding the proposed candidates for state offices. The meeting concluded with a call to the entirety of the Party, its citizens, and the military to build upon the achievements attained thus far, address existing limitations and weaknesses, and strengthen the significant national unity bloc to accomplish the socio-economic targets established for the latter half of 2016 and beyond. The plenum also adopted a resolution, but it was not made public.

==== 4th Plenary: Economic issues and party building (9–14 October) ====
This session was opened on 9 October and focused on socio-economic affairs. Specifically, it addressed the socio-economic conditions prevalent in 2016, the 2017 socio-economic development plan draft, and an indeterminate number of "major guidelines and policies" intended to enhance Vietnam's growth model, improve the quality of economic growth, and increase workforce productivity. It also addressed the safeguarding of Vietnam's political independence in the context of engaging in international free trade agreements. The plenary session also considered non-economic issues, including strategies to mitigate tendencies towards self-evolution and self-transformation within the party, to prevent the degradation of communist ideology, to promote socialist morality, and to evaluate the Politburo's proposal for enhancing party development while preserving appropriate political stance.

During the session, Nguyễn Phú Trọng noted that many cadres have shown a troubling decline in their political ideology, ethics, and lifestyle. He asserted that these cadres advocated for pluralism, called for a separation of powers (as opposed to Vietnam’s unified power), and praised civil society. The plenary session deliberated on the report presented by Phạm Minh Chính, representing the 12th Politburo, entitled "Enhancing Party building and rectification; preventing and curbing ideological, ethical and lifestyle degradation, and the manifestation of 'self-evolution' and 'self-transformation' inside the Party". The report advocated enhancing party education in Marxism–Leninism, establishing a regulatory mechanism on party education, and conducting internal criticism and self-criticism to address these anti-communist manifestations and combat lax political standards and discipline.

The first working day opened with Nguyễn Xuân Phúc presenting the Government Party Committee report on the national economic situation in 2016 and 2017. Deputy Prime Minister and Foreign Minister Phạm Bình Minh delivered a proposal on behalf of the Politburo entitled "Effectively implementing international economic integration while maintaining socio-political stability in the context of Vietnam joining new-generation free trade agreements". Deputy Prime Minister Vương Đình Huệ subsequently presented another proposal from the Politburo regarding significant policies aimed at renewing the economic model and enhancing the quality of economic growth, thereby boosting labour productivity and the economy's competitiveness. On day two, 10 October, the plenum discussed the country's socio-economic challenges, the execution of the 2016 state budget, and the state budget estimates for 2017. The morning session held on 11 October was presided over by Nguyễn Xuân Phúc, who continued discussions on economic matters. In the afternoon, the plenary participants were organised into working groups to deliberate on proposals for guidelines and policies to enhance economic development, revitalise the economic model, increase competitiveness, and improve quality growth.

12 October began with a morning session, presided over by Nguyễn Thị Kim Ngân, that continued discussions from the third working day. On 12 October, the 4th Plenary Session was once more organised into working groups, focusing on implementing international economic integration while maintaining socio-political stability in the context of Vietnam's involvement in numerous new trade agreements. On the fifth day, 13 October, the morning session, which Trần Đại Quang facilitated, discussed Vietnam's international economic integration and political stability. This was succeeded in the afternoon by a session moderated by Nguyễn Xuân Phúc, which deliberated upon two reports: one pertaining to foreign policy and the other regarding the fourth industrial revolution. The 4th Plenary Session concluded a day ahead of schedule, on 14 October, and adopted policies to ensure macroeconomic stability that contributed to Vietnam's integration into the world economy.

=== 2017 ===
==== 5th Plenary: Evaluation of policies and Đinh La Thăng's removal (5–10 May) ====
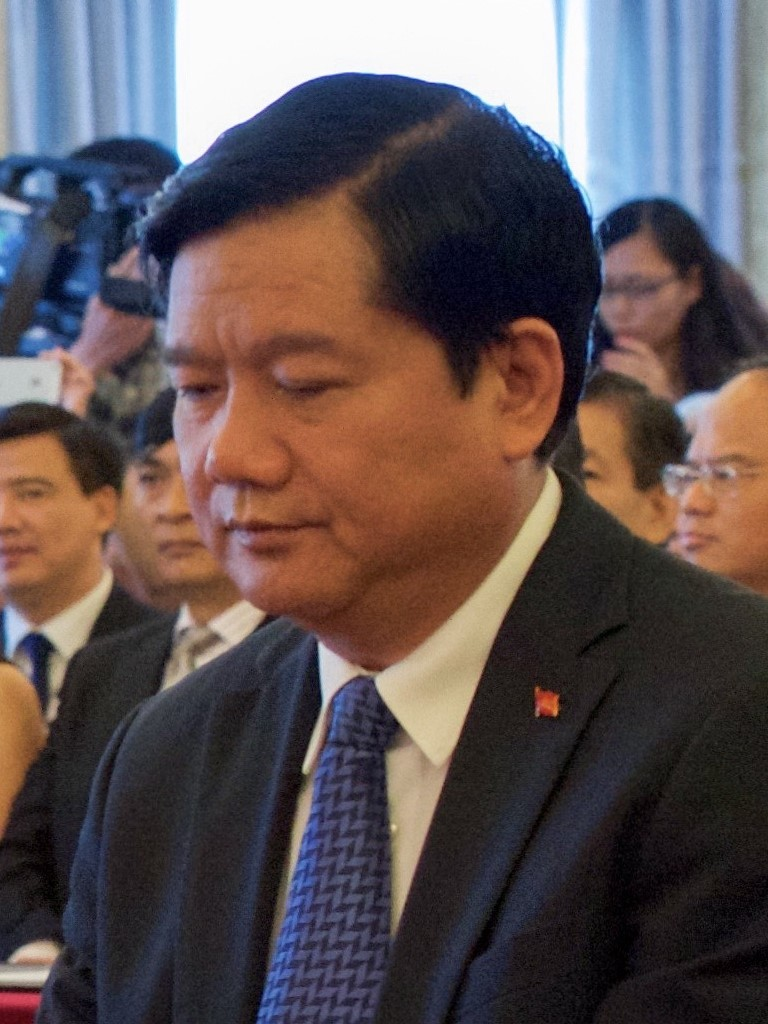
The 5th Plenary Session removed Đinh La Thăng from the Politburo.

The 5th Plenary Session convened on 5 May. The session focused on the enhancement of the institutions pertaining to the socialist-oriented market economy, the restructuring and operational efficiency of state-owned enterprises, strategies to promote and support the growth of the private sector, a report evaluating the efforts of the Politburo and Secretariat concerning the execution of the resolutions established at the 12th National Congress in 2016, as well as disciplinary measures taken against party members "and a number of other important issues". Specifically, it evaluated the decade-long implementation of Resolution No. 19-NQ/TW from the 6th Plenary Session of the 9th Central Committee concerning land reform policies and legislation. Furthermore, it assessed the fifteen-year enforcement of Resolution No. 26-NQ/TW from the 7th Plenary Session of the 10th Central Committee, which pertains to agriculture, peasants, and farming areas. Additionally, the session examined the two-decade application of Resolution No. 13-NQ/TW from the 9th Plenary Session of the 9th Central Committee, aimed at enhancing the collective economy's productivity, innovation and development. In his inaugural address, Nguyễn Phú Trọng told the plenum that the Secretariat had established multiple steering committees tasked with examining, synthesising, and formulating projects concerning the above-mentioned subjects, which were to be reported to the Politburo for consideration.

On 7 May, the third day was presided over by Nguyễn Phú Trọng, during which the disciplinary case concerning fellow Politburo member Đinh La Thăng, the Secretary of the Hồ Chí Minh City Party Committee, was deliberated upon. CIC Chairman Trần Quốc Vượng delivered a report on behalf of the Politburo concerning the allegations against Đinh La Thăng regarding his leadership of the Vietnam Oil and Gas Group, commonly known as PetroVietnam, in which he committed deficiencies and legal infractions in running the company. Specifically, he was charged with violating regulations set forth by PetroVietnam by entering into commercial agreements before securing authorisation from the company's Board of Directors, approving bidding packages that violated government decrees, offering the Prime Minister counsel that did not adhere to legal standards, and infringing upon the Law on Bidding. Đinh La Thăng was then granted the opportunity to speak in his own defence. After considering both perspectives, more than ninety percent of the session participants voted to remove Đinh La Thăng from the Politburo. According to researcher Le Hong Hiep from the ISEAS–Yusof Ishak Institute, some individuals claim that the corruption allegations aimed at prominent figures, such as Đinh La Thăng, are unsubstantiated and that the anti-corruption campaign was used as a pretext to eliminate opponents of Nguyễn Phú Trọng. Hiep expresses disagreement with this claim, arguing that the evidence does not substantiate it.

On the last day, on 10 May, the CPV announced that the 5th Plenary Session had adopted three resolutions: (1) Resolution on completing institutions for the socialist-oriented market economy, (2) Resolution on continuing to reorganise, renovate, and improve the efficiency of State-owned enterprises and (3) Resolution on developing the private economic sector into an important driving force of the socialist-oriented market economy. The statement and report concerning the work performance of the Politburo and the Secretariat in 2016 were also approved. At last, the session announced that Đinh La Thăng had resigned from his position as secretary of the Hồ Chí Minh City Party Committee and had been appointed deputy head of the CPV Central Economic Commission.

==== 6th Plenary: Socio-economic challenges, Nguyễn Xuân Anh's dismissal and elections (4–7, 9–11 October) ====
On 4 October, the 12th CC convened its 6th Plenary Session. The agenda included Vietnam's socio-economic situation and financial issues for 2017, a draft plan for socioeconomic development and financial estimates for 2018. The discussion also encompassed a variety of significant topics, including healthcare, public sector reform, gender imbalance, birth rate, an ageing population, lean and efficient political governance, party leadership, “and other important matters".

Subsequently, Nguyễn Xuân Phúc delivered, on behalf of the Government Party Committee, the report of the Government Party Board concerning the socio-economic situation, the state budgets for 2017, and the tasks designated for 2018. Trương Hòa Bình then presented a project aimed at enhancing the nation's healthcare system. Phạm Bình Minh subsequently made a statement regarding population work. During the afternoon session, Vương Đình Huệ, representing the Politburo, presented a report on the reform of the management mechanism, financial mechanism, and the reorganisation of the system of public non-business units. The working day concluded with the plenum participants being divided into working groups to discuss the report from the Government Party Board regarding the socio-economic situation, the 2017 state budgets, and the tasks for 2018. On the second day, the morning session, presided over by Nguyễn Xuân Phúc, continued the deliberation on the report of the Government Party Board. During the afternoon session, participants were organised into working groups to deliberate on strategies for enhancing the healthcare system.

On the third working day, chaired by Nguyễn Phú Trọng, the second youngest member of the 12th CC, Nguyễn Xuân Anh, was dismissed, and two members were elected to the 12th Secretariat. Nguyễn Xuân Anh, the youngest provincial party secretary in the CPV at that time, was accused of grave violations of principles governing party operations. These violations encompassed breaching regulations that outline prohibitions for party members, infringing democratic centralism, and engaging in corrupt practices. The plenum voted to relieve him of all his positions, including his CC membership. The case also attracted attention as Nguyễn Xuân Anh is the son of Nguyễn Văn Chi, the chairman of the CIC during the 10th and 11th terms tenures. The next item on the day's agenda was the election of Phan Đình Trạc and Nguyễn Xuân Thắng to the Secretariat. Up to that point, Phan Đình Trạc had served as chairman of the party's Central Internal Affairs Commission, while Nguyễn Xuân Thắng concurrently held the positions of rector of the Hồ Chí Minh National Academy of Politics and Public Administration and vice chairman of the Central Theoretical Council. The afternoon session was chaired by Nguyễn Thị Kim Ngân, and the participants were organised into working groups to discuss proposals for improving the healthcare system and policies on population work.

On 7 October, the fourth day of the session, the participants gathered in the morning to discuss the renewal of the management and financial mechanisms of the state and the restructuring of the system governing non-business public entities. The 12th CC then adjourned for one and a half days before reconvening for its fifth working day on the 9th October. During the plenum recess, the 12th Politburo convened to approve the CPV's inaugural regulation on personnel rotation, which Nguyễn Phú Trọng signed in his capacity as general secretary on 7 October. According to scholar Carlyle Thayer, the regulation pertains to a personnel strategy concerning the rotation of leadership and management personnel. The regulation prohibits central and provincial party committees from rotating cadres who have been disciplined or are under investigation. It is also stipulated that cadres cannot be appointed to lead local organisations if they are natives of the area or have spent a significant portion of their careers in the locality in question. The fifth working day began with a morning session, chaired by Nguyễn Xuân Phúc, which examined the proposal for reforming management and financial mechanisms and reorganising state administrative units. The meeting progressed into the afternoon under the guidance of Mr. Trần Quốc Vượng. This was followed by Phạm Minh Chính, who, on behalf of the Politburo, presented the proposal to reorganise the political system to enhance its cleanliness and efficiency. The working day concluded with participants arranged into working groups to discuss the proposal presented by Phạm Minh Chính. This discussion extended into the sixth working day, under the moderation of Nguyễn Thị Kim Ngân.

The final session of the sixth plenum commenced on 11 October. Under the moderation of Trần Đại Quang, the Politburo presented the newly amended reports and proposals that had been altered to reflect the wishes of the 12th CC. Nguyễn Xuân Phúc presented the report on the socio-economic situation, the 2017 State budget, and the tasks for 2018. Trương Hòa Bình subsequently presented the revised report on enhancing the national healthcare system. The Politburo then presented a newly revised report and proposal concerning population work, management and financial mechanisms reform, reorganising public non-business entities, streamlining the political system, and enhancing state effectiveness efficiency. The official report from the concluding session noted that the 12th CC concurred that Vietnam had made positive progress in 2017. Nonetheless, the 12th CC indicated that Vietnam continues encountering various difficulties and challenges. These include significant overspending and public debt, a considerable number of non-performing loans, sluggish disbursement of official development assistance and government bond capital, loss-making state-owned enterprises, breaches of environmental protection regulations and food hygiene standards, as well as complex traffic accidents and criminal activities. Furthermore, the meeting emphasised that renewing the growth model, restructuring the economy, increasing labour productivity, and enhancing economic competitiveness were critical issues that required attention in 2018. The session proceeded to abolish the CPV's regional steering committees (Central Highlands, Northwest and Southwest) and to reorganise the Party Committee of the Ministry of Foreign Affairs. The session concluded by adopting the "Resolution of the 6th Plenary Session of the 12th Central Committee of the Communist Party of Vietnam".

=== 2018 ===
==== 7th Plenary: Wage reform, social insurance and personnel work (7–12 May) ====
The 7th Plenary Session convened on 7 May under Nguyễn Phú Trọng's chairmanship. The plenum programme included discussions of cadre policy, wage policies and national social insurance policy; hear and control the work reports of the Politburo and the Secretariat in 2017, the work report of the Politburo on work done since the 6th Plenary Session the report by the CIC on inspection, supervision and discipline, and performance of the CIC and inspection committees at all levels in 2017; and address "a number of other important issues.

The first working day of the 7th plenum was presided over by Trần Đại Quang, who had been suffering from undisclosed health issues and had remained out of the public eye from 25 July to 28 August 2017. On behalf of the Politburo, Phạm Minh Chính proposed the recruitment of a new contingent of cadres at all levels, with a particular focus on the strategic level. According to scholar Nicholas Chapman, the party's rhetoric concerning strategic cadres remains ambiguous and raised more questions than it answered. Nevertheless, by emphasising the ethical qualities required for membership in the Central Committee, the proposal conveyed to potential newcomers the criteria they needed to meet. When discussing strategic cadres, Nguyễn Phú Trọng echoed Nguyễn Văn Linh's assertion that the "Party must reform or die”, stating that the party's initiatives in this regard would determine whether the revolution will succeed or falter.

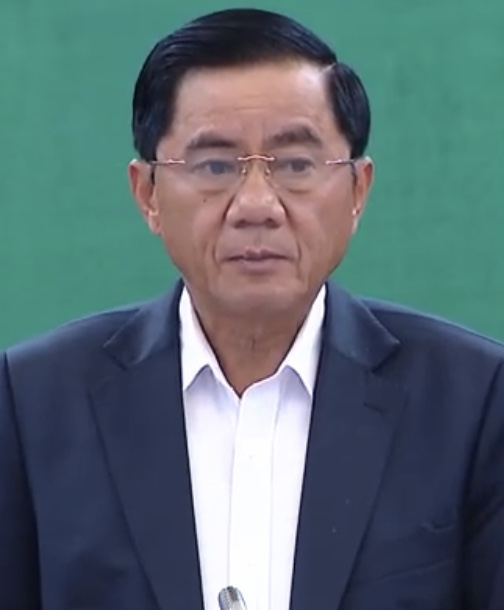
The plenum elected Trần Cẩm Tú CIC chairman.

The next item on the agenda was another proposal from the Politburo, presented by Trương Hòa Bình, pertaining to the reform of salaries for state employees, civil servants, military personnel, and workers in enterprises. This was subsequently followed by Vương Đình Huệ, who introduced a reform plan for social insurance. In the afternoon, the plenum participants were divided into working groups to discuss the proposal presented by Phạm Minh Chính. The following day, 8 May, Nguyễn Xuân Phúc presided over the morning session and continued to engage in deliberations regarding the proposal for the recruitment of a new cadre contingent at all levels. The official report noted that participants had discussed cadre policy. They had devised new ideas, objectives, and proposals for solutions to cultivate a new group of cadres capable of executing their designated tasks with integrity, skill, and prestige. Furthermore, they discussed establishing a power control mechanism to mitigate bribery. This entailed appointing individuals from outside the local area to serve on party committees at both the provincial and district levels, as well as the training and employment of young officials. There was almost unanimous agreement on the necessity for a new resolution regarding personnel; however, some participants proposed developing comprehensive implementation plans for personnel. Notably, there was a consensus regarding the appointment of non-local officials to the positions of secretaries for the provincial and district committees of the CPV. The session readout indicated that policies and roadmaps would be developed to support these cadres' work.

During the debate on cadre work, Đỗ Văn Chiến, a member of the 12th CC and chairman of the Government Committee for Ethnic Affairs, argued that maintaining a clean administration is challenging when officials supervise areas with which they have close personal and familial connections, as this increased the risk of nepotism. Nguyễn Văn Thể, the Minister of Transportation, endorsed Đỗ Văn Chiến's comments. Furthermore, Nguyễn Mạnh Hùng, the general director of Viettel Group, emphasised the importance of enhancing transparency in cadre work, particularly in the area of housing and training. After the discussions, the session voted to increase the representation of young, female, and ethnic minority officials across all tiers of governance while instituting a new evaluation process system. In the afternoon, participants were organised into working groups to deliberate wage reform concerning cadres, civil servants, state officials, military officials, and enterprise workers.

On the third working day, 9 May, the morning session commenced with the formal acceptance of Trần Quốc Vượng's resignation as CIC chairman and as a member of the 12th CIC. The session proceeded to elect Trần Cẩm Tú, the permanent deputy chairman under the leadership of Trần Quốc Vượng, as the CIC chairman. It also elected Hoàng Văn Trà to the 12th CIC. Subsequently, the 7th plenum elected Trần Cẩm Tú and Trần Thanh Mẫn as members of the 12th Secretariat. Trần Thanh Mẫn had previously served as the secretary of the Cần Thơ City Party Committee before being elected as the chairman of the Central Committee of the Vietnamese Fatherland Front. Before the plenum, there had been speculations amongst foreign observers that the plenum would elect additional politburo members, but none were elected. For instance, scholar David Hutt believed that as many as three new members might be elected to the politburo. Scholar Le Hong Hiep named five potential candidates for politburo membership; Lương Cường, Nguyễn Văn Nên, Nguyễn Hòa Bình, Phan Đình Trạc and Nguyễn Xuân Thắng. In a similar vein, David Brown anticipated that the plenum would reinforce Nguyễn Phú Trọng's authority within the party leadership.

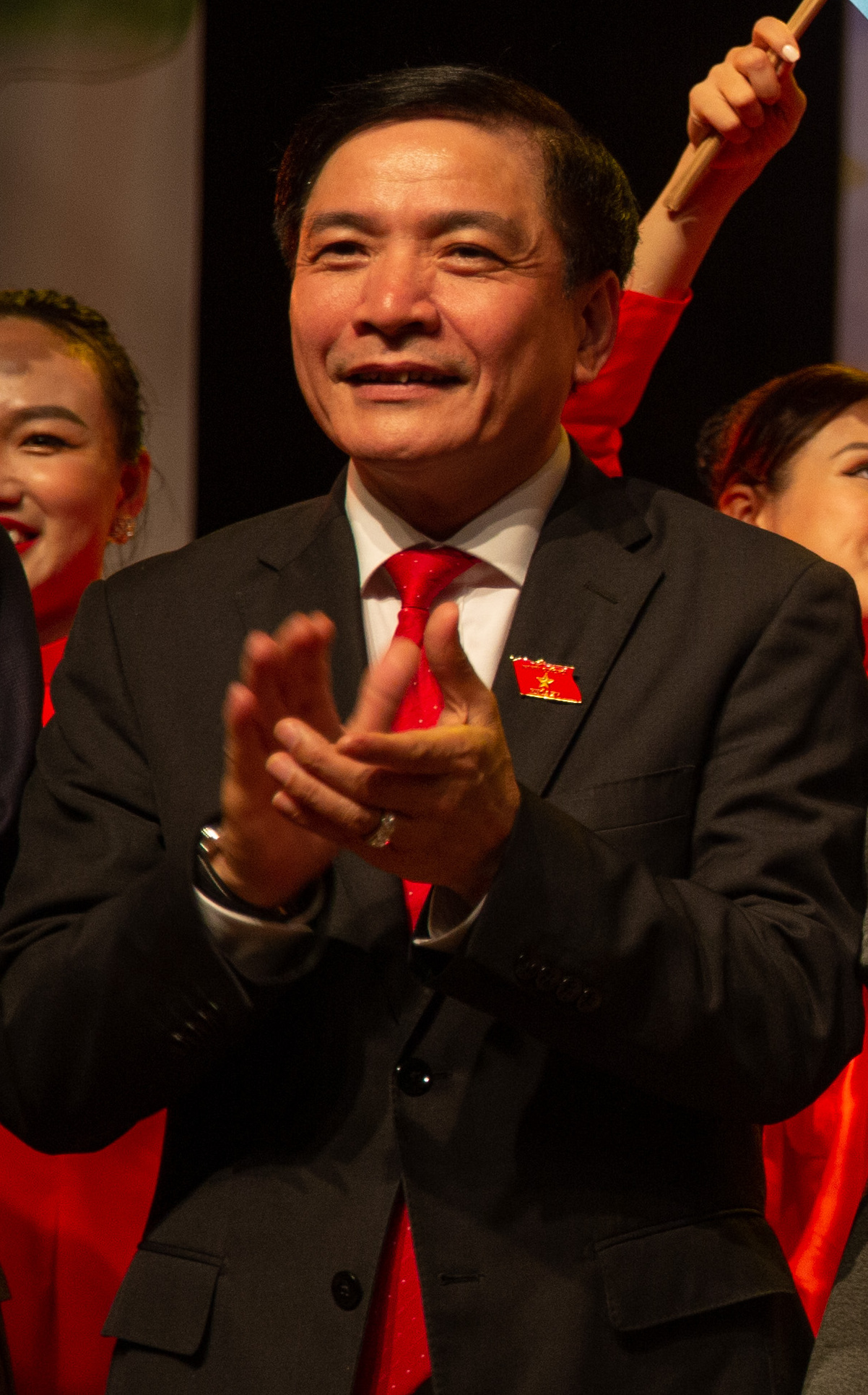
Bùi Văn Cường, the President of the Central Committee of the Vietnam General Confederation of Labour, supported the wage reform proposal.

The session then shifted its focus to corruption. The next item on the agenda was reviewing the disciplinary case concerning Đinh La Thăng, who had been removed from the Politburo by the 5th Plenary Session. Since the fifth plenum, Đinh La Thăng has received a sentence of 13 years in prison for willfully contravening the state's regulations on economic management, resulting in severe consequences and the embezzlement of assets occurring at PetroVietnam. Consequently, the CIC’s 24th Session on 23 April 2018, recommended that the 7th Session implement the most severe disciplinary action possible: the expulsion of Đinh La Thăng from the party. The session approved the CIC’s recommendation.

Later that same working day, under the leadership of Nguyễn Thị Kim Ngân, the plenum assembled for an afternoon session to deliberate on wage reform for cadres, public servants, military officers, and state employees. Minister of Home Affairs Lê Vĩnh Tân presented a report outlining the targets, tasks, and proposed solutions for the wage reform. To enhance operational efficiency, he advocated for substantial interventions regarding budgetary and financial measures, personnel reductions, and the reorganisation of the deployment of public servants and cadres, in addition to streamlining the political system. During the debate, Deputy Minister of Defence Be Xuan Truong expressed his support for the report presented by Lê Vĩnh Tân, arguing that a reduction of ten percent of staff annually could facilitate the acceleration of wage reform. Phạm Hoài Nam, also deputy minister of defence, supported the proposal. He observed the necessity of considering the income and expenditure of officials across different regions, considering the disparities in development levels from one locality to another, if the reforms were to be implemented effectively. Bùi Văn Cường, the president of the Central Committee of the Vietnam General Confederation of Labour, endorsed the proposal while emphasising the importance of establishing a cohesive legal framework for trade unions to represent workers in wage negotiations.

According to the official communiqué, the third working day of the 7th Plenary Session achieved a strong consensus on the new resolution on wage reform. The same document noted that plenum participants had formulated four suggestions. Firstly, public sector wages should serve as the benchmark for wages in other sectors. Secondly, regulations regarding macro and micro management of wage policy should be established to enhance the management capabilities of local organisations. Thirdly, it emphasises the importance of wages being determined by job titles, positions, and performance. Finally, calling for the establishment of a mechanism that regulates and guides the reform to ensure its success. The finance minister, Đinh Tiến Dũng, informed the session that the wage reform would be implemented in accordance with Resolutions No. 18 and No. 19 of the 12th CC, which focused on restructuring public debt to maintain a safe and sustainable debt level, and Resolution No. 07, which aimed to ensure the sustainability of the state financial system. The scholar Nicholas Chapman viewed the wage reforms as an effort to prevent catastrophic economic mismanagement in state-owned enterprises. In the system that existed at the time, board members of state-owned enterprises (SOEs) were appointed rather than employed. They received a monthly wage that fluctuated. The wage reform aimed to change this by stipulating that board members would receive remuneration solely upon fulfilling business objectives and safeguarding the company's assets. The concept posited that noncompliance would result in the termination of the relevant board members and, under exceptional circumstances, necessitate that the relevant board members compensate the company for losses.

Participants were organised into working groups to discuss social insurance policy reforms during the morning session of the fourth working day, 10 May. In the afternoon, the plenum, led by Trần Quốc Vượng, deliberated on reforms to the social insurance system. On the following day, 11 May, the plenum convened to review and oversee the work report presented by the Politburo and Secretariat regarding their activities in the year 2017. The afternoon was devoted to studying and formulating amendments to the proposals discussed at the plenum. On the plenum's last day, participants listened to the newly-amended proposals "On building a contingent of cadres at all levels", "On wage reform" and "On social insurance policy". The 7th Plenary Session then approved the "Report reviewing the leadership and guidance of the Politburo and the Secretariat in 2017", the "Report on important affairs handled by the Politburo since the PCC's 6th plenary session" and the "Report on inspection, supervision and discipline work in the Party, performance of the PCC's Inspection Commission and inspection committees at all levels in 2017". It also approved three resolutions: "Resolution on building a contingent of cadres at all levels, especially strategic level, with sufficient virtue, capacity and prestige on a par with their assigned tasks", "Resolution on salary reform for officials, public servants, the armed forces and labourers working in enterprises" and "Resolution on social insurance policy reform".

==== 8th Plenary: Economic policy, state budget and personnel issues (2–6 October) ====
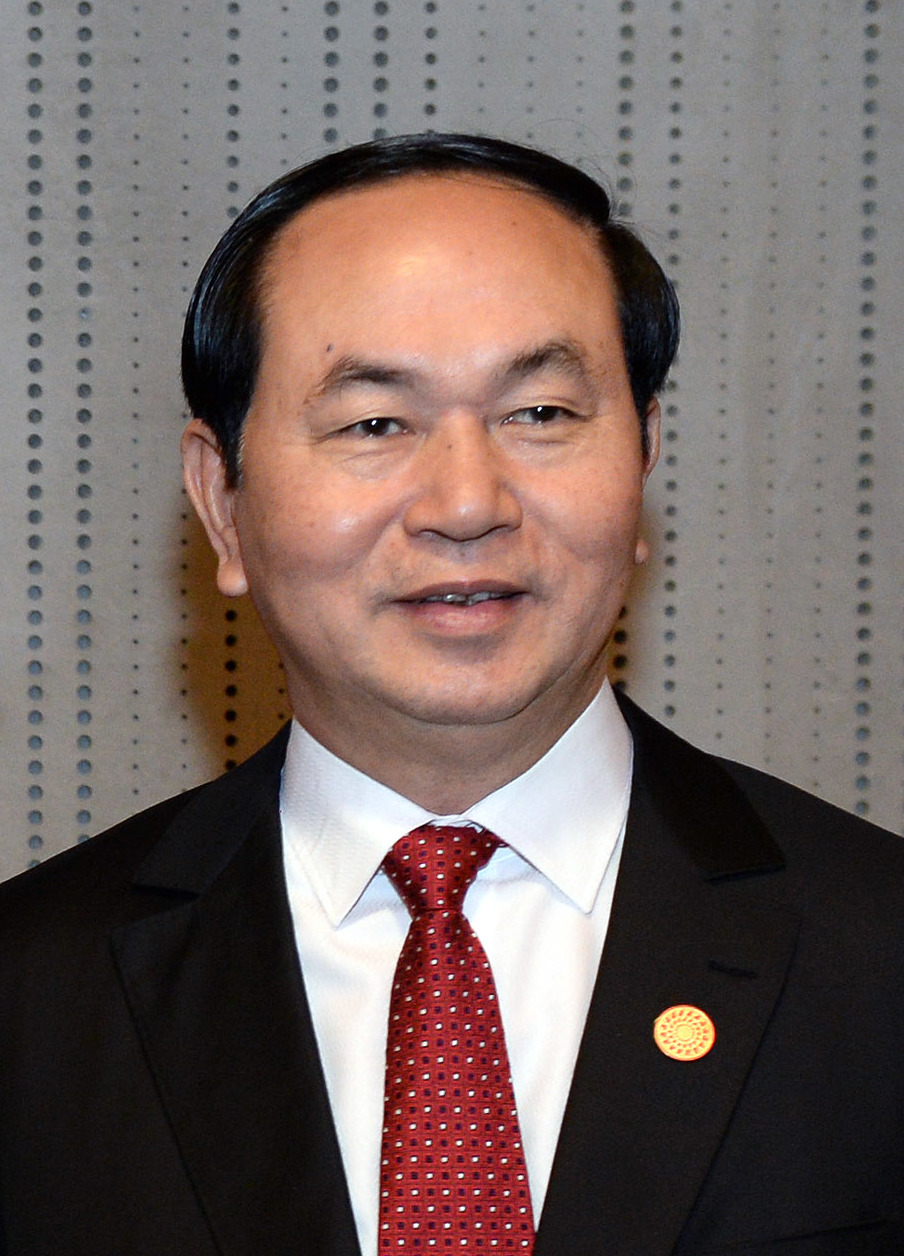
Trần Đại Quang, who had served as state president since 2 April 2016, died on 21 September 2018. The plenum nominated Nguyễn Phú Trọng as a presidential candidate to succeed Trần Đại Quang.

On 18–19 September, the 12th Politburo convened a meeting to seek feedback on proposals to be submitted to the 8th Plenary Session. On 28 September, Bùi Trường Giang, the Deputy Head of the CPV's Commission for Information and Education, announced that the 12th CC would convene for its 8th Plenary Session from 2 to 6 October. When the 12th CC convened on 2 October, it began by observing a minute of silence in honour of Đỗ Mười, a former general secretary of the CPV Central Committee, who died on 1 October 2018, and Trần Đại Quang, the most recent president of Vietnam, who died on 21 September 2018. The eighth plenum programme called on participants to issue a conclusion regarding the status of the country's socio-economic development and the state budget for 2018, as well as a conclusion on the socio-economic development situation and state budget for 2019. It also called for their approval of a resolution on sustainable sea-based economic progress, the issuance of regulations regarding the responsibilities of party members and officials to set an example, and the establishment of preparatory committees for the organisation of the 13th National Congress.

A considerable portion of the first working day was dedicated to listening to reports presented on behalf of the 12th Politburo. Nguyễn Phú Trọng delivered the opening remarks at the session before Nguyễn Xuân Phúc presented the reports from the Government Party Committee, titled "On the Socio-Economic Situation and State Budget in 2018" and "On the Socio-Economic Development Plans and State Budget Estimates for 2019." Phạm Bình Minh then delivered the report, "On summing up the 10-year implementation of the resolution of the 4th Plenary Session of the 10th Central Committee of the Communist Party of Vietnam on Vietnam's Maritime Strategy to 2020". Phạm Minh Chính then presented two proposals. The first, the "Regulation on the responsibility to set an example of officials and Party members, first of all, members of the Politburo, the Party Central Committee Secretariat and the Party Central Committee" and the second, on establishing five preparatory committees on documents, socio-economic affairs, regulations, personnel and organisation to organise the 13th National Congress. In the afternoon, the 12th CC was organised into working groups to discuss the reports presented by Nguyễn Xuân Phúc.

The reports submitted by the Government Party Committee, as presented by Nguyễn Xuân Phúc, remained the topic of discussion throughout the second working day. During this debate, fourteen members of the 12th Central Committee, who were not members of the Politburo, made proposals to the plenum. Bế Xuân Trường observed that, in light of the complex global landscape, the party-state needed to predict future conditions accurately. He expressed concern that Vietnam could fall into the middle income trap if it did not sufficiently concentrate on investments in high-tech industries and advanced technology to enhance labour productivity, improve the quality of economic growth, and boost national competitiveness. Hoàng Đăng Quang, the secretary of the Quảng Bình Provincial Party Committee, noted significant issues, particularly the sluggish disbursement of state investment and the slow response from state agencies when solicited for assistance. He therefore proposed initiating a mid-term review of implementing the three strategic breakthroughs: modernising the growth model, restructuring the economy, and improving societal development. Quang believed such a review would offer significant lessons for the CC's remaining tenure and establish a foundation for the 13th National Congress. Furthermore, he advocated revising the Law on Public Investment and the Law on Land.

A significant portion of the debate centred on increasing labour productivity. The Chairman of the Central Committee of the Vietnam Farmers' Union's, Thào Xuân Sùng, implored the plenum to initiate policies aimed at enhancing agricultural productivity, restructuring agricultural organisations, transitioning the agricultural growth model, establishing cooperatives, and developing “new-style rural areas." Vũ Hồng Thanh, the Chairman of the National Assembly's Economic Committee, expressed concern that labour productivity grew slower in 2018 than in 2017. He suggested improving labour productivity by shifting the national economic focus from agricultural services to the industrial and service sectors. Nguyễn Văn Hùng, the secretary of the Quảng Trị Provincial Party Committee, concurred with Vũ Hồng Thanh and suggested reintroducing the previous plan for cultural and human development. Conversely, Acting President Đặng Thị Ngọc Thịnh highlighted the issue of crime and urged increased resources to address illegal activities.

In the afternoon, every member attending the 8th Plenary Session voted to introduce Nguyễn Phú Trọng as a presidential candidate for the 6th Session of the 14th National Assembly. It also elected Võ Thái Nguyên and Trần Đức Thắng as members of the 12th CIC. According to academic Le Hong Hiep, Nguyễn Phú Trọng's nomination was unexpected, considering his advanced age and the reported lack of enthusiasm about consolidating the roles of general secretary and state president. His reluctance, as argued by Le Hong Hiep, to engage with the matter was said to have delayed discussions on the topic within the Central Committee and the Politburo for some time. Scholar Cù Huy Ha Vu theorised that the CPV was following the path laid by the former communist states of Europe, particularly Laos and China, where the party leader has concurrently served as state president since 1991 and 1993 respectively. David Hutt, on the other hand, disagreed with Cù Huy Ha Vu, contending that Nguyễn Phú Trọng wielded less power and influence than his Chinese counterpart, CCP general secretary Xi Jinping. According to Hutt, the nomination of Nguyễn Phú Trọng represents the most straightforward option, as the appointment of an alternative official would have disrupted the party's customary proceedings of political maneuvering, which typically occur for no less than eighteen months before a National Congress.

On 4 October, the third working day, the eighth plenum held a morning session to discuss the draft document, "On summing up the 10-year implementation of the resolution of the 4th Plenary Session of the 10th Central Committee of the Communist Party of Vietnam on Vietnam's Maritime Strategy to 2020". The Politburo, acting upon the recommendation of the CIC, proposed disciplinary measures against former members of the Central Committee: Trần Văn Minh, who previously served as the minister of information and communications, and Nguyễn Bắc Son, former deputy head of the CPV's Organisation Commission and secretary of the Đà Nẵng City Party Committee. Trần Văn Minh was expelled from the party, while Nguyễn Bắc Son was subsequently removed from the 11th Central Committee as well as other party-state positions. In the afternoon, the focus moved away from corruption to reviewing the report on the 10-year implementation of Vietnam's maritime strategy.

On 5 October, during the morning session, the 8th Plenary Session discussed in groups the draft "Regulation on the responsibility to set an example of officials and Party members, first of all, members of the Politburo, the Party Central Committee Secretariat and the Party Central Committee". The plenary session then discussed the establishment of committees responsible for preparing the forthcoming party congress. The 12th CC continued its discussion on the above matters in the afternoon. On the final day, the resolution regarding the strategy for the sustainable development of Vietnam's sea-based economy by 2030, with a vision for 2045, was approved. The session tasked the Politburo with refining, publishing, and implementing the resolution. It also deliberated on the provision regarding the responsibility of party members and officials—primarily those in the Politburo, the Secretariat, and the Central Committee―to set an example for the rest of the party. The 8th Plenary Session concluded with decisions on the socio-economic situation, the 2018 state budget, and forecasts for the socio-economic development plan and state budget for 2019.

==== 9th Plenary: Personnel planning, no-confidence vote and Tất Thành Cang's ouster (25–26 December) ====
The Central Committee held its 9th Plenary Session on 25 December. The agenda included nominating candidates to the 13th Central Committee, organising a vote of confidence in the members of the Politburo and the Secretariat, and reviewing a disciplinary case. Prior to the plenum, the 12th Politburo had compiled a list of 200 prospective candidates for membership in the 13th CC. The declared objective was to ascertain that new Central Committee members were devoid of corruption and genuinely committed to communist principles, thereby enabling them to protect the Party from self-transformation and self-evolution tendencies.

On 25 December, the plenum convened to initiate a motion of no confidence against 21 of the 24 members of the 12th Politburo and Secretariat. As Đinh Thế Huynh was on sick leave, he did not face a no-confidence vote. Trần Cẩm Tú and Trần Thanh Mẫn were not subjected to no-confidence votes, as party regulations explicitly stipulate a requirement of three years of service in a particular position before being eligible for such a vote. In the context of the no-confidence vote, the members of the 12th Central Committee evaluated the political and ethical attributes of the officeholders, their political positions regarding the enforcement of the party's guidelines and resolutions, and their compliance with party regulations and state legislation. Practical results were also a criterion. The Politburo oversaw the vote of no confidence, while the Central Organisation Commission facilitated the preparation of the ballots. A Vote Counting Committee was established to tally the results. Members of the 12th CC could vote for three options: "high confidence”, "confidence”, and "low confidence”. According to party rules, individuals who received more than fifty percent of the low-confidence votes would have to leave office.

On the last working day of the 9th Plenary Session, Phạm Minh Chính commenced the morning proceedings by presenting, on behalf of the Politburo, the report on personnel planning for the 13th Central Committee. The plenum then discussed the report. In the afternoon, Trần Cẩm Tú, in his capacity as CIC chairman, initiated the proceedings by delivering the Politburo's recommendation on imposing disciplinary measures against Central Committee member Tất Thành Cang. The corruption of Tất Thành Cang was first revealed during the 31st Session of the CIC. At the subsequent 32nd Session, the CIC advised the 12th Politburo that he should be removed from his position due to his violations of democratic concentration and the relevant authority, principles, and procedures governing his role. Trần Cẩm Tú indicated that Tất Thành Cang had breached regulations established by the Hồ Chí Minh City Party Committee concerning the management and utilisation of assets within enterprises owned by the local government. The 9th Plenary Session accepted the allegations and voted to remove him from all party and state positions. The meeting then adjourned, to be reconvened later in the afternoon, during which the 12th CC adopted the "Resolution of the 9th Plenary Session of the 12th Party Central Committee."

=== 2019 ===
==== 10th Plenary: Preparing for the 13th National Congress (16–18 May) ====
The 10th Plenary Session convened on 16 May and marked the first 12th CC plenum that Nguyễn Phú Trọng attended since suffering a heart attack on 14 April 2019 while exercising his official duties. Given his age and health issues, rumours circulated that Nguyễn Phú Trọng intended to retire at the end of the 12th CC's electoral term. At this point, several potential frontrunners emerged, with Trần Quốc Vượng, Phạm Minh Chính, and Nguyễn Xuân Phúc being the early favourites, according to commentators Ha Hoang Hop and Lye Liang Fook.

The plenum's agenda covered various topics, particularly the draft documents prepared for submission to the 13th National Congress scheduled for early 2021 and the organisation of party congresses at all levels in anticipation of the national congress. During the discussions, the session examined the draft political report and the implementation plan for the platform adopted by the 11th National Congress for the next decade. It also addressed the socio-economic development strategy for 2011–2020 and a report on party building and the party Charter. The agenda included a session reviewing the activities of the Politburo and the Secretariat since the last plenum. Furthermore, the agenda stated that the 12th CC would evaluate how effectively the Party's disciplinary bodies performed their inspection, monitoring, and execution tasks in 2018. Before the proceedings began, Nguyễn Phú Trọng informed the participants that he expected the plenum to invest time in researching, discussing, and providing insights on the key topics and guiding ideas for the 13th National Congress. This included the congress's slogan, the title of the political report, the socio-economic development plan for 2021–2030, major issues in party building, and challenges related to implementing the party's charter.

The proceedings of the first working day commenced with participants being organised into working groups. These groups engaged in discussions that continued into the afternoon on the draft documents for the 13th National Congress. On the second working day, the 10th plenum conducted a thorough examination of the report assessing the implementation of Directive 36-CT/TW of the 11th Politburo. This directive pertained to party congresses at all-levels in preparation for the 12th National Congress. Additionally, the plenum reviewed a draft order from the 12th Politburo on party congresses at all levels in the lead-up to the 13th National Congress. In the afternoon, the session took a break while the Politburo assembled for a meeting to remark on reports that summarised the ideas expressed by plenum participants. The review also included an analysis of the 2021–2030 socio-economic development strategy, the assessment report on socio-economic performance from 2016 to 2020, the socio-economic development plan for 2021–2025, as well as a draft report summarising the initiatives on party building and the enforcement of the party Charter. The concluding session was presided over by Nguyễn Phú Trọng and moderated by Nguyễn Thị Kim Ngân. Nguyễn Xuân Phúc, representing the Politburo, presented the report on the collection of opinions from members of the 12th Central Committee regarding the draft documents of the 13th National Congress. The draft resolution of the 10th Plenary Session, which Trần Quốc Vượng presented, was the next item on the agenda. After the presentation, the session unanimously adopted the "Resolution of the 10th Plenary Session of the 12th Party Central Committee".

==== 11th Plenary: 13th National Congress preparations and expulsion of corrupt members (7–12 October) ====
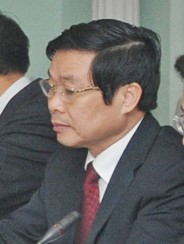
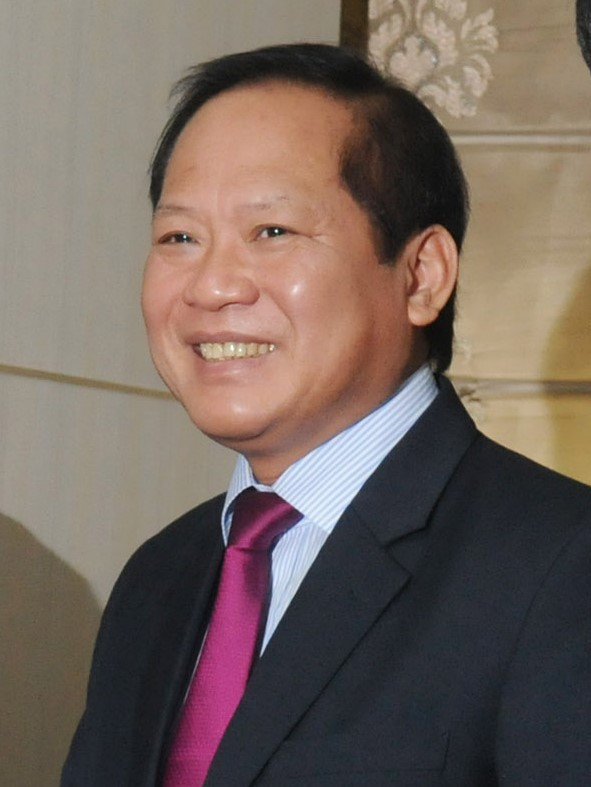
Nguyễn Bắc Son (left) and Trương Minh Tuấn (right) were expelled from the Party at this plenum.

On 7 October, the 12th CC gathered for its 11th Plenary Session. The discussion encompassed the proposed draft documents of the 13th National Congress, which include the political report and the report titled "Report on the 10-Year Implementation of the Platform on National Construction in the Period of Transition to Socialism." The draft reports pertaining to implementing the socio-economic strategy for 2011–2030 and 2021–2030 were also deliberated. The session also reviewed the draft report concerning the party's development and enforcing the party charter. At last, it addressed the socio-economic and budgetary performance of 2019–2020.

In his inaugural address, Nguyễn Phú Trọng emphasised that 2020 was crucial for preparing the 13th National Congress. He also acknowledged the party's achievements in combating corruption, informing the session that 70 high-ranking officials under the central leadership’s management were disciplined. This included five members of the 12th Central Committee, fourteen former members of the Central Committee, one former deputy prime minister, five current and former ministers, two sitting provincial party secretaries, five former provincial party secretaries, and seventeen military officers.

On the second working day, under the authority of Trần Quốc Vượng, the plenary session conducted extensive deliberations on the draft political report and the "Report on the 10-Year Implementation of the Platform on National Construction During the Period of Transition to Socialism." In the afternoon, the plenum participants were organised into working groups to evaluate the draft reports on the implementation of socio-economic strategies for 2011–2030 and 2021–2030, a report on the socio-economic situation in 2016–2020 and a draft "Five-Year Plan for Socio-economic Development 2021–2025.".

On the plenum’s third day, presided over by Nguyễn Xuân Phúc, it once again evaluated the draft report concerning the socio-economic situation for 2016–2020 and the draft "Five-Year Plan for Socio-economic Development from 2021 to 2025." Later in the afternoon, the participants were organised into working groups to deliberate on the report concerning the socio-economic situation and the state budget for the same year. They also provided remarks on the draft 2020 Plan for Socio-economic Development, the budget proposal for 2020, and the budget-finance plan for 2020–2022. On the fourth working day, led by Nguyễn Thị Kim Ngân, participants continued deliberating on the aforementioned draft documents on economic affairs. In the afternoon, however, attention shifted to party governance, and working groups were established to discuss the "Report on Party Building and Implementation of the Party Charter." This deliberation continued at the morning session of the fifth working day.

The fifth working day was devoted to election and party discipline. The Politburo nominated Hồ Minh Chiến, Nguyễn Văn Hội, Nguyễn Minh Quang and Tô Duy Nghĩa for CIC membership: they were all elected. Following this, the Politburo, acting on the CIC's recommendation, proposed enforcing disciplinary measures by expelling Nguyễn Bắc Son and Trương Minh Tuấn from the party on the grounds of political corruption, and the session endorsed this recommendation. On the final working day, the plenary session approved a resolution, and Nguyễn Phú Trọng delivered the closing speech, indicating that the plenum largely concurred with the draft reports presented.

=== 2020–2021 ===
==== 12th Plenary: 13th Central Committee personnel planning, elections, and Nguyễn Văn Hiến's expulsion (11–14 May) ====
Two events that occurred before the 12th Plenary Session impacted its discussions. On 8 January, the Central Inspection Commission recommended a disciplinary reprimand for politburo member Hoàng Trung Hải, which the 12th Politburo approved on 10 January. The other being the politburo's adoption of regulation no. 214-QD/TW, which established the principles for nominating candidates for the 13th National Congress. It explicitly stated that those nominated for the "four pillars" (party leader, state president, prime minister, and National Assembly chair) must serve as "the center of unity" within the party and possess a "high reputation among the general public" to be electable.

The two aforementioned decisions were succeeded by an article authored by Nguyễn Phú Trọng, entitled "Some Issues That Need Special Attention in the Preparation of Personnel for the XIII Party Congress". In this article, Nguyễn Phú Trọng emphasised that all candidates must demonstrate strong ethical principles, possess integrity, eschew opportunistic behaviors, reject personal ambitions for power, and establish credibility among the populace to be electable. According to scholar Hai Hong Nguyen, this effectively prevented Hoàng Trung Hải and any other official with a controversial history from holding high office. This policy aligned with his blazing furnace campaign, which, at this juncture, had disciplined over 53,000 government and party officials, nearly 100 of whom worked under the Central Committee’s management.

The 12th Central Committee convened for its 12th Plenary Session under the chairmanship of Nguyễn Phú Trọng on 11 May. In his opening address, Nguyễn Phú Trọng informed the attendees that the plenum coincided with the 45th anniversary of South Vietnam's liberation and national reunification, the 130th birthday of former president Hồ Chí Minh, as well as the ongoing battle against the COVID-19 pandemic. Following his address, the agenda was approved. The plenum deliberated on personnel planning for the 13th Central Committee. the nomination of deputies for the 15th National Assembly and People's Councils at all levels for the 2021–2026 term, and the election of delegates to the 13th National Congress.

Nguyễn Xuân Phúc presided over the plenum’s inaugural working day. Proceedings commenced with Trần Quốc Vượng seeking the opinions of the CC members regarding the agenda for the 12th plenum. Phạm Minh Chính subsequently delivered a report on behalf of the Politburo, evaluating the personnel work of the 12th Central Committee and proposing an organisation for the election of the 13th CC. He subsequently reviewed another report summarising the delegate distribution for the 10th, 11th and 12th party congresses. Phạm Minh Chính then turned his focus to the proposed structure, quantity, and criteria concerning delegates, as well as the allocation plan for delegates to the 13th National Congress.

The session then shifted its focus to the state. Nguyen Thi Kim Ngan presented a report on behalf of the National Assembly Party Committee concerning the selection of deputies to the 15th National Assembly and the People's Councils at all levels for the 2021–2026 term. In the afternoon, the 12th Plenary Session was organised into working groups to discuss documents related to the personnel work of the 12th CC and the allocation of delegates to the 13th National Congress.

The second working day was presided over by Trần Quốc Vượng and continued with a discussion of personnel work for the 13th CC and preparing for the election of the 15th National Assembly. While details from the third working day were not made public, Nguyễn Phú Trọng mentioned in his closing remarks that two more members were elected to the CIC: Nguyễn Văn Hùng, secretary of the Kon Tum Provincial Party Committee, and Trần Thị Hiền, the director of the CIC's General Department. The session also resolved to expel Nguyễn Văn Hiến, who had faced prior disciplinary action for corruption, from the CPV. In his closing speech, Nguyễn Phú Trọng apprised the public that the plenum had conducted discussions in accordance with party regulations on possible candidates for the 13th CC, the 13th Politburo and the 13th Secretariat.

==== 13th Plenary: National Congress preparations (5–9 October) ====
The 13th Plenary Session of the Central Committee convened on 5 October under Nguyễn Phú Trọng’s chairmanship The session covered several important topics, such as the socio-economic situation in 2020 and the development plan for 2021. It also moved forward with preparations for the 13th National Congress by discussing candidates for the 13th Central Committee and the congressional draft documents.

In his opening remarks, Nguyễn Phú Trọng urged participants to evaluate the nation's socio-economic conditions objectively, formulate forecasts for the coming years, analyse shortcomings, and propose solutions. To prepare appropriate responses for even the most challenging situations, Nguyễn Phú Trọng asserted that the 12th Central Committee needed to outline significant tasks for 2021 and subsequent years. Nguyễn Phú Trọng encouraged the plenum to examine the latest congressional draft documents thoroughly, approve the draft political report, and prepare the draft reports on the socio-economic outlook and party development. The plan was to disseminate these documents to the National Assembly, the Vietnamese Fatherland Front (VFF), various sociopolitical organisations, and the general public for discussion by mid-October. Nguyễn Phú Trọng also informed the plenum that the politburo would present a draft list of candidates to be nominated for the 13th Central Inspection Commission, emphasising the necessity for thorough scrutiny of the candidates to ensure that the party's work was transparent and adhered to democratic and equitable principles.

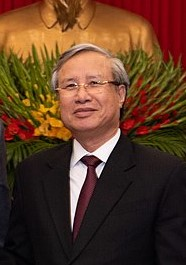
Trần Quốc Vượng apparently failed to garner support to succeed Nguyễn Phú Trọng as general secretary at this plenum.

On behalf of the Politburo, Nguyễn Thị Kim Ngân presided over the first working day of the plenum. First, Trương Hòa Bình commenced the proceedings by reading the Politburo's submission regarding the completion and supplementation of the draft report summarising the implementation of the socio-economic development strategy for 2011–2020. This included developing a socio-economic development strategy for 2021–2030 and assessing the socio-economic development goals and orientations for 2021–2025 following the economic development tasks from 2016–2020.

Subsequently, Trần Quốc Vượng presented the Politburo's report regarding the communication of recent developments and the gathering of opinions from party organisations and members. Furthermore, he informed the attendees that the draft political report for the 13th National Congress was being finalised. Afterwards, Phạm Minh Chính reviewed the report submitted by the Politburo regarding the efforts to gather opinions from Party committees, organisations, and members. Additionally, he examined the draft report summarising the activities of the 12th National Congress concerning party building and the enforcement of the party charter. He subsequently informed the participants that these draft reports would be submitted to the 13th National Congress.

Nguyễn Xuân Phúc, on behalf of the Government Party Committee, delivered a report outlining the socio-economic situation of 2020, the 2020 state budget, the socio-economic development plan for 2020, the budget estimates for 2021, and the financial plan for the state budget from 2021 to 2023. In the afternoon, the session organised working groups to deliberate on the draft political report, the summary of the implementation of the socio-economic development plan for 2011–2020, and the formulation of the socio-economic development plan for 2021–2030. These documents were discussed by the aforementioned working groups in the afternoon. During the second and third working days, the plenum participants persisted in deliberating on the previously mentioned draft documents.

On the fourth day of work, under Nguyễn Phú Trọng's leadership, the session shifted focus to personnel issues. Acting on behalf of the Politburo, Pham Minh Chinh presented candidates to head the Ministry of Science and Technology and Ministry of Health; plenum attendees then picked their preferred candidate. He then presented candidates to the 13th Central Committee and the 13th CIC, and the session participants voted for their preferred candidates. It also seems that the session, at this point, discussed who would succeed Nguyễn Phú Trọng as general secretary. According to scholar David Brown, Nguyễn Phú Trọng's preferred successor, Trần Quốc Vượng, failed to garner support at the plenum, and he lagged behind Nguyễn Xuân Phúc.

Nguyễn Thị Kim Ngân, on behalf of the politburo, led the final working day, which was chiefly devoted to preparatory work for the 13th National Congress. At the commencement of the proceedings, the session was apprised of the voting results for candidates to the 13th term of the CC and the CIC. However, these results were not disclosed to the public. The following speaker, Trần Quốc Vượng, shared the politburo’s views on the draft political report. Subsequently, Trương Hòa Bình presented the report concerning the Central Committee's perspective on the draft report summarising the execution of the socio-economic development strategy for the period of 2011 to 2020. He also addressed the development of the socio-economic strategy for 2021–2030, assessed the completion of the socio-economic tasks for 2016–2020 and the orientations and tasks for socio-economic development for 2021–2025.

The fourth working day continued with Pham Minh Chinh informing the session on the politburo's review and assessment of the Central Committee's views on the draft document on party building and enforcing the party charter. Nguyễn Xuân Phúc proceeded to present the politburo's report on the Central Committee's evaluation of the socio-economic conditions and the state budget for 2020, and the state budget and financial plan for the years 2021 and 2021–2023. The working day, and the 13th plenum, ended with the adoption of the "Resolution of the 13th Plenary Session of the 12th Party Central Committee".

==== 14th Plenary: Finalising the draft documents of the 13th National Congress (14–18 December) ====
The Committee convened on 14 December. The plenum assessed the views of lower-level party congresses, the National Assembly, VFF, socio-political organisations, officials, party members, and the public on the congressional draft documents. By 20 November, 67 central-run party organisations had submitted their opinions on the draft documents. The opinions were gathered, organised, and synthesised into a classified report of 200 pages. In his opening speech, Nguyễn Phú Trọng urged attendees to thoroughly analyse the report and refute any opinions contradicting the party's principles. The agenda encompassed the introduction of candidates for the 13th Politburo and Secretariat, the finalisation of draft working rules and electoral regulations for the forthcoming congress that adhere to the principles of democratic centralism, and “other significant matters.”

On the first working day, Trần Quốc Vượng presented, on behalf of the politburo, a confidential report addressing the feedback from party congresses at all levels, the National Assembly, the VFF, socio-political organisations, officials, members, and citizens nationwide about the draft political report. Subsequently, Trương Hòa Bình presented a politburo report to clarify the comments made by party congresses at all levels, members of the National Assembly, the VFF, various socio-political organisations, cadres, party members, and the public regarding the draft ten-year strategy report and the five-year direction and task report. Phạm Minh Chính delivered a similar report on the draft documents, summarising the party's development and the enforcement of the party Charter during the 12th term.

Subsequently, Trần Quốc Vượng elaborated on how the politburo produced the "Report on the Review of the Leadership and Direction of the 12th Central Committee", which was not made public. He additionally reviewed the "Report on the Summary of Implementation of the Central Committee, Politburo, and Secretariat's Working Regulations." In the final report of the day, Phạm Minh Chính introduced the Politburo's report on the proposed working regulations and electoral regulations for the upcoming congress. He also updated them about the proposed agenda and proceedings for the 13th National Congress. After these reports, the session was organised into working groups that deliberated the aforementioned draft documents. Under Nguyễn Thị Kim Ngân's leadership, the 14th Plenary Session continued its discussion on the draft documents during the second working day, and once again, under Trần Quốc Vượng's guidance, on the third day.

The fourth working day, led by Nguyễn Phú Trọng, concentrated on personnel issues. In the morning session, Pham Minh Chinh delivered the politburo's report on personnel selection for the 13th Politburo and the 13th Secretariat. A nomination process was then organised, during which session participants cast their votes (with their votes functioning as recommendations) on whether the sitting members of the politburo and the secretariat would be re-elected. Once that process concluded, a second voting process was organised. This time, they could vote for members of the CC who did not concurrently serve in the politburo and the secretariat, with the eligible candidates from the initial voting process being excluded.

After the voting process, the CIC Chairman Trần Cẩm Tú informed the session of a disciplinary case involving Nguyễn Đức Chung. Trần Cẩm Tú informed the session that the politburo recommended his expulsion from the party, a motion to which the plenum consented. Nguyễn Đức Chung, in his role as chairman of the Hanoi People's Committee, was accused of appropriating documents that contained classified information. This was revealed during an investigation into the tech firm Nhat Cuong Technical Services Trading Co. Ltd., where officials discovered extensive smuggling and embezzlement of millions in revenue.

The 14th plenum concluded two days ahead of schedule, on 18 December, successfully approving all draft documents for the forthcoming congress. According to official pronouncements, the session also managed to attain a "very high consensus" on the composition of the future politburo and Secretariat. Decisions regarding "special cases”, individuals who might receive an age exemption to sit another term, were somewhat contradictory, postponed and left to the 15th plenum. The plenum also instructed the politburo to continue working on the draft congressional electoral and working regulations.

==== 15th Plenary: Completing congress preparations (16–17 January) ====
On 16 January 2021, the 12th Central Committee held its last plenary session before its term ended. The agenda included finalising a list of candidates for membership in the Central Committee, Politburo, and Secretariat for the 13th tenure and adopting the 12th Central Committee's report on personnel work for the election of the 13th CC. The plenum was also scheduled to approve the "Report of the 12th Party Central Committee on Documents submitted to the 13th National Congress”, discuss the party's audit assessment for 2016–2020, and nominating the candidates for the Presidium, Secretarial Delegation and the Commission for Verifying Eligibility of Delegates. The plenum approved these documents.

More importantly, the fifteenth plenum, continued the work left over from the fourteenth plenum regarding "special cases”. This refers to individuals over 60 who were recommended for membership in the CC and those aged 65 and above nominated for membership in the 13th Politburo and 13th Secretariat. Party regulations required competent authorities to examine these cases before the relevant individuals were granted the right to stand for office. The election results were not disclosed, but the official announcement indicated that the 12th CC achieved a strong consensus on the matter. In light of this, scholar David Brown stated that the rumor mill indicated with unusual unanimity that Nguyễn Phú Trọng was expected to be elected for another term as general secretary. Le Hong Hiep, in an article for the ISEAS–Yusof Ishak Institute, mentioned that credible yet informal information—later confirmed as accurate—indicated that Nguyễn Xuân Phúc was set to be nominated as state president, Phạm Bình Minh as prime minister, and Vương Đình Huệ as chairman of the National Assembly during the 13th CC term.

== 13th National Congress ==
The 13th National Congress convened for its preparatory session on 25 January. It approved the 12th Central Committee's proposal for "Working Regulations, Electoral Regulations and Work Programme". It then elected a congress presidium consisting of 17 members (which was composed of 16 members of the 12th Politburo and VFF chairman Trần Thanh Mẫn), a 5-member secretarial delegation and a 13-member Commission for Verifying Eligibility of Delegates. The verification commission then produced a "Report on the Verification of the Qualification of Delegates to the 13th National Congress", which the delegates adopted unanimously. All 1,587 congress delegates were deemed eligible to serve. The 12th CC's nominees for the 13th CC stood for election on 30 January 2021. Later that day, Nguyễn Thanh Bình reported the election results on behalf of the Vote Counting Committee: 180 members and twenty alternates elected, of which 119 had served in the 12th CC and 81 were newcomers. Having failed to find a successor, the 1st Plenary Session of the 13th CC reelected Nguyễn Phú Trọng for a third term as CPV general secretary.
