= 12th Secretariat of the Communist Party of Vietnam =

Secretariat of Vietnam's Communist Party

12th Secretariat
- Symbol of the Communist Party of Vietnam

27 January 2016 – 25 January 2021 (4 years, 364 days) Overview
- Type: Executive organ
- Election: 1st Plenary Session of the 12th Central Committee

Leadership
- General Secretary: Nguyễn Phú Trọng
- Permanent Member: Trần Quốc Vượng (2018–21); Đinh Thế Huynh (2016–18)

Members
- Total: 14 members
- Newcomers: 7 members (12th)
- Old: 3 members (11th)
- Reelected: 6 members (13th)

The 12th Secretariat, formally the Secretariat of the 12th Central Committee of the Communist Party of Vietnam (CPV, Vietnamese: Ban Bí thư Ban Chấp hành Trung ương Đảng Cộng sản Việt Nam Khoá XII), was elected on 27 January 2016 during the 12th National Congress to serve for a five-year electoral term. The secretariat is a central leading organ of the CPV Central Committee responsible for executing the decisions of the politburo and the Central Committee. It is tasked with handling day-to-day work as well as leading and supervising the work of the Central Committee apparatus, which is the administrative working organs of the CPV Central Committee. In this regard, it functions as the highest executive organ of the CPV when the Party's National Congress and the Central Committee are adjourned.

== History ==
The 12th Secretariat was led by a general secretary, who formally directed its work, and a permanent member of the Secretariat, responsible for its day-to-day work. Nguyễn Phú Trọng was elected general secretary on 27 January 2016 and remained in office for the duration of the Central Committee's term, while the 12th Politburo appointed Đinh Thế Huynh as the permanent member of the secretariat on 4 February 2016. He held this position until 2 March 2018, when he was relieved of his duties and succeeded by Trần Quốc Vượng. Đinh Thế Huynh had been on sick leave since July 2017 to undergo medical treatment for an undisclosed health problem. On 28 July 2017, the 12th Politburo convened to discuss the proposal of the Central Organisation Commission (COC) to assign a politburo member as the standing member of the Secretariat in light of Đinh Thế Huynh's health problems: it appointed Trần Quốc Vượng to serve in an acting capacity from 1 August 2017 onwards. BBC News concluded that Trần Quốc Vượng was most likely selected as the permanent member to strengthen the ongoing anti-corruption campaign unleashed under Nguyễn Phú Trọng's leadership. Trần Quốc Vượng had gained experience in anti-corruption work in his earlier stint as the director of the Supreme People's Procuracy. On 2 March 2018, the 12th Politburo convened yet again, ordering Đinh Thế Huynh to resign from office and appointing Trần Quốc Vượng in his place.

At first, the composition of the 12th Secretariat was the same as that of the 11th electoral term, and stood at ten members. The first three members (Lương Cường, Nguyễn Văn Nên and Nguyễn Hòa Bình) were elected on 27 January 2016 by the 1st Plenary Session of the 12th Central Committee. That session ordered the 12th Politburo to assign individuals from its own ranks to serve in the Secretariat. A week later, on 4 February, the 12th Politburo convened and assigned six members to the secretariat: Nguyễn Phú Trọng, Đinh Thế Huynh, Trần Quốc Vượng, Phạm Minh Chính, Võ Văn Thưởng and Trương Thị Mai. Of these, Nguyễn Phú Trọng, Đinh Thế Huynh and Trần Quốc Vượng had served in the 11th Secretariat. This politburo meeting also assigned the work responsibilities of the members, appointing them to head administrative working bodies of the CPV Central Committee apparatus. Phạm Minh Chính was appointed to lead the COC, Võ Văn Thưởng to direct the Central Propaganda and Education Commission, Trương Thị Mai to oversee the Central Mass Mobilisation Commission and Nguyễn Văn Nên to manage the Central Office. Trần Quốc Vượng served in the Secretariat as the chairman of the Central Inspection Commission. Two months later, it was made public that the 12th Politburo had assigned Nguyễn Văn Bình, the former governor of the State Bank of Vietnam, to head the Central Economic Commission from 11 April 2016.

On 7 October 2017, the 6th Plenary Session of the 12th Central Committee elected Phan Đình Trạc and Nguyễn Xuân Thắng to the Secretariat. Up to that point, Phan Đình Trạc had served as chairman of the party's Central Internal Affairs Commission, while Nguyễn Xuân Thắng concurrently held the positions of rector of the Hồ Chí Minh National Academy of Politics and Public Administration and vice chairman of the Central Theoretical Council. Two months later, on 14 October, Nguyễn Xuân Thắng was assigned on the orders of the 12th Politburo to serve as acting chair of the Central Theoretical Council since Đinh Thế Huynh could no longer fulfil his duties due to health problems. With Đinh Thế Huynh's health problems worsening, Nguyễn Xuân Thắng was appointed in his place on 2 March 2018. At the 12th Central Committee's seventh plenum on 9 May, Trần Cẩm Tú and Trần Thanh Mẫn were elected to the secretariat. Trần Cẩm Tú had earlier the same day been elected as chairman of the CPV Central Inspection Commission, while Trần Thanh Mẫn had previously served as the secretary of the Cần Thơ City Party Committee before being elected as the chairman of the Central Committee of the Vietnamese Fatherland Front.

== Members ==
Members of the 12th Secretariat of the Communist Party of Vietnam[14]
Name	11th	13th	Birth	PM	Birthplace	Education	Gender	Ref.
Nguyễn Hòa Bình	Nonmember	Member	1958	1981	Hà Nội	Graduate	Male	
Nguyễn Văn Bình	Nonmember	Nonmember	1961	1995	Phú Thọ	Graduate	Male	
Phạm Minh Chính	Nonmember	Nonmember	1958	1986	Thanh Hoá	Graduate	Male	
Lương Cường	Nonmember	Nonmember	1957	1978	Phú Thọ	Undergraduate	Male	
Đinh Thế Huynh	Member	Nonmember	1953	1974	Nam Định	Graduate	Male	
Trương Thị Mai	Nonmember	Member	1958	1985	Quảng Bình	Graduate	Female	
Trần Thanh Mẫn	By-elected	Nonmember	1962	1982	Hậu Giang	Graduate	Male	
Nguyễn Văn Nên	Nonmember	Nonmember	1957	1978	Tây Ninh	Undergraduate	Male	
Nguyễn Xuân Thắng	By-elected	Nonmember	1957	1983	Nghệ An	Graduate	Male	
Võ Văn Thưởng	Nonmember	Member	1970	1993	Vĩnh Long	Graduate	Male	
Phan Đình Trạc	By-elected	Member	1958	1980	Nghệ An	Undergraduate	Male	
Nguyễn Phú Trọng	Member	Member	1944	1968	Hà Nội	Graduate	Male	
Trần Cẩm Tú	By-elected	Member	1961	1990	Hà Tĩnh	Graduate	Male	
Trần Quốc Vượng	Member	Nonmember	1953	1979	Thái Bình	Graduate	Male	

== Working Organs ==
Working Organs of the Central Committee of the Communist Party of Vietnam
Working Organ	Leadership					Ref.
Working Organ	Title	Officeholder	Term start	Term end	Secretariat	Ref.
Central Economic Commission	Head	Vương Đình Huệ	27 January 2016	11 April 2016	Outgoing	
Central Economic Commission	Head	Nguyễn Văn Bình	11 April 2016	30 January 2021	Represented	
Central External Relations Commission	Head	Hoàng Bình Quân	27 January 2016	30 January 2021	Not	
Central Health Care Protection Board	Head	Nguyễn Quốc Triệu	27 January 2016	21 June 2019	Not	
Central Health Care Protection Board	Head	Nguyễn Thị Kim Tiến	5 July 2019	30 January 2021	Not	
Central Inspection Commission	Chairman	Trần Quốc Vượng	27 January 2016	8 May 2018	Represented	
Central Inspection Commission	Chairman	Trần Cẩm Tú	8 May 2018	30 January 2021	Represented	
Central Internal Affairs Commission	Head	Phan Đình Trạc	27 January 2016	30 January 2021	Represented	
Central Mass Mobilisation Commission	Head	Hà Thị Khiết	27 January 2016	17 February 2016	Outgoing	
Central Mass Mobilisation Commission	Head	Trương Thị Mai	17 February 2016	30 January 2021	Represented	
Central Office	Head	Trần Quốc Vượng	27 January 2016	15 February 2016	Represented	
Central Office	Head	Nguyễn Văn Nên	15 February 2016	20 October 2020	Represented	
Central Office	Head	Lê Minh Hưng	20 October 2020	30 January 2021	Not	
Central Organisation Commission	Head	Tô Huy Rứa	27 January 2016	15 February 2016	Outgoing	
Central Organisation Commission	Head	Phạm Minh Chính	4 February 2016	30 January 2021	Represented	
Central Propaganda and Education Commission	Head	Đinh Thế Huynh	27 January 2016	15 February 2016	Represented	
Central Propaganda and Education Commission	Head	Võ Văn Thưởng	4 February 2016	30 January 2021	Represented	
Central Theoretical Council	Chairman	Đinh Thế Huynh	27 January 2016	2 March 2018	Represented	
Central Theoretical Council	Chairman	Nguyễn Xuân Thắng	2 March 2018	30 January 2021	Represented	
Nhân Dân	Editor-in-chief	Thuận Hữu	27 January 2016	30 January 2021	Not	
