= 13th Central Inspection Commission of the Communist Party of Vietnam =

Central Inspection Commission of Vietnam's Communist Party

The 13th Central Inspection Commission (CIC) of the Communist Party of Vietnam (CPV), formally the 13th Central Inspection Commission of the Central Committee of the Communist Party of Vietnam (Vietnamese: Ủy ban Kiểm tra Trung ương Đảng Cộng sản Việt Nam khóa XIII), was elected by the 1st Plenary Session of the 13th Central Committee in the immediate aftermath of the 13th National Congress. Trần Cẩm Tú was re-elected for a second term as Chairman of the CIC, a position he has held since 2018.

== Officers ==
Title	Name	Gender	Ref.
Chairman of the Central Inspection Commission	Trần Cẩm Tú	Male	
Permanent Deputy Chairman of the Central Inspection Commission	Trần Văn Rón	Male	
Deputy Chairman of the Central Inspection Commission	Trần Tiến Hưng	Male	
Deputy Chairman of the Central Inspection Commission	Hoàng Văn Trà	Male	
Deputy Chairman of the Central Inspection Commission	Nghiêm Phú Cường	Male	
Deputy Chairman of the Central Inspection Commission	Nguyễn Minh Quang	Male	

== Members ==
Members of the 13th Central Inspection Commission
Rank	Name	12th CIC		Gender	Ref.
Rank	Name	New	Rank	Gender	Ref.
1	Trần Cẩm Tú	Old	1	Male	
2	Hồ Minh Chiến	Old	17	Male	
3	Nghiêm Phú Cường	Old	7	Male	
4	Đoàn Anh Dũng	New	—	Male	
5	Trần Thị Hiền	Old	21	Male	
6	Nguyễn Quốc Hiệp	Old	11	Male	
7	Nguyễn Văn Hội	Old	18	Male	
8	Nguyễn Văn Hùng	Old	6	Male	
9	Vũ Khắc Hùng	Old	10	Male	
10	Hoàng Trọng Hưng	New	—	Male	
11	Nguyễn Tiến Hưng	New	—	Male	
12	Tô Duy Nghĩa	Old	19	Male	
13	Võ Thái Nguyên	Old	15	Male	
14	Nguyễn Văn Nhân	Old	14	Male	
15	Nguyễn Minh Quang	Old	20	Male	
16	Trần Văn Rón	New	—	Male	
17	Trần Đức Thắng	Old	16	Male	
18	Cao Văn Thống	Old	9	Male	
19	Hoàng Văn Trà	Old	5	Male	
20	Phạm Đức Tiến	By-election	—	Male	
21	Nguyễn Văn Quyết	By-election	—	Male	

== Bibliography ==
- Truong, Mai (2022). "Declining opportunities for speaking out: The impact of Vietnam's new leadership on grassroots collective action". Asian Journal of Comparative Politics. 9: 50–68. doi:10.1177/20578911221139764. S2CID 254009559.
