= 11th Secretariat of the Communist Party of Vietnam =

Secretariat of Vietnam's Communist Party

The 11th Secretariat of the Communist Party of Vietnam (CPV), formally the 11th Secretariat of the Central Committee of the Communist Party of Vietnam (Vietnamese: Ban Bí thư Ban Chấp hành Trung ương Đảng Cộng sản Việt Nam Khoá XI), was partly elected by a decision of the 11th Politburo and partly elected by the 1st Plenary Session of the 11th Central Committee (CC) in the immediate aftermath of the 11th National Congress.

== Members ==
Members of the 11th Secretariat of the Communist Party of Vietnam
Rank	Name	10th SEC		12th SEC		Birth	PM	Birthplace	Education	Ethnicity	Gender	Ref.
Rank	Name	New	Rank	New	Rank	Birth	PM	Birthplace	Education	Ethnicity	Gender	Ref.
1	Nguyễn Phú Trọng	New	—	Reelected	1	1944	1968	Hà Nội City	Graduate	Kinh	Male	
2	Trương Tấn Sang	Old	2	Not	—	1949	1969	Long An province	Undergraduate	Kinh	Male	
3	Lê Hồng Anh	New	—	Not	—	1949	1968	Kiên Giang province	Undergraduate	Kinh	Male	
4	Tô Huy Rứa	Old	9	Not	—	1947	1967	Thanh Hóa province	Graduate	Kinh	Male	
5	Ngô Văn Dụ	Old	10	Not	—	1947	1969	Vĩnh Phúc province	Undergraduate	Kinh	Male	
6	Đinh Thế Huynh	New	—	Reelected	2	1953	1974	Nam Định province	Graduate	Kinh	Male	
7	Ngô Xuân Lịch	New	—	Not	—	1954	1973	Hà Nam province	Graduate	Kinh	Male	
8	Trương Hòa Bình	New	—	Not	—	1955	1973	Long An province	Graduate	Kinh	Male	
9	Hà Thị Khiết	Old	11	Not	—	1950	1969	Tuyên Quang province	Undergraduate	Tày	Female	
10	Nguyễn Thị Kim Ngân	New	—	Relieved	—	1954	1981	Bến Tre province	Graduate	Kinh	Female	
11	Trần Quốc Vượng	By-election	—	Reelected	3	1953	1979	Thái Bình province	Graduate	Kinh	Male	

== Bibliography ==
- Truong, Mai (2022). "Declining opportunities for speaking out: The impact of Vietnam's new leadership on grassroots collective action". Asian Journal of Comparative Politics. OnlineFirst: 50–68. doi:10.1177/20578911221139764. S2CID 254009559.
