= Trần Quốc Vượng (politician) =

Vietnamese politician

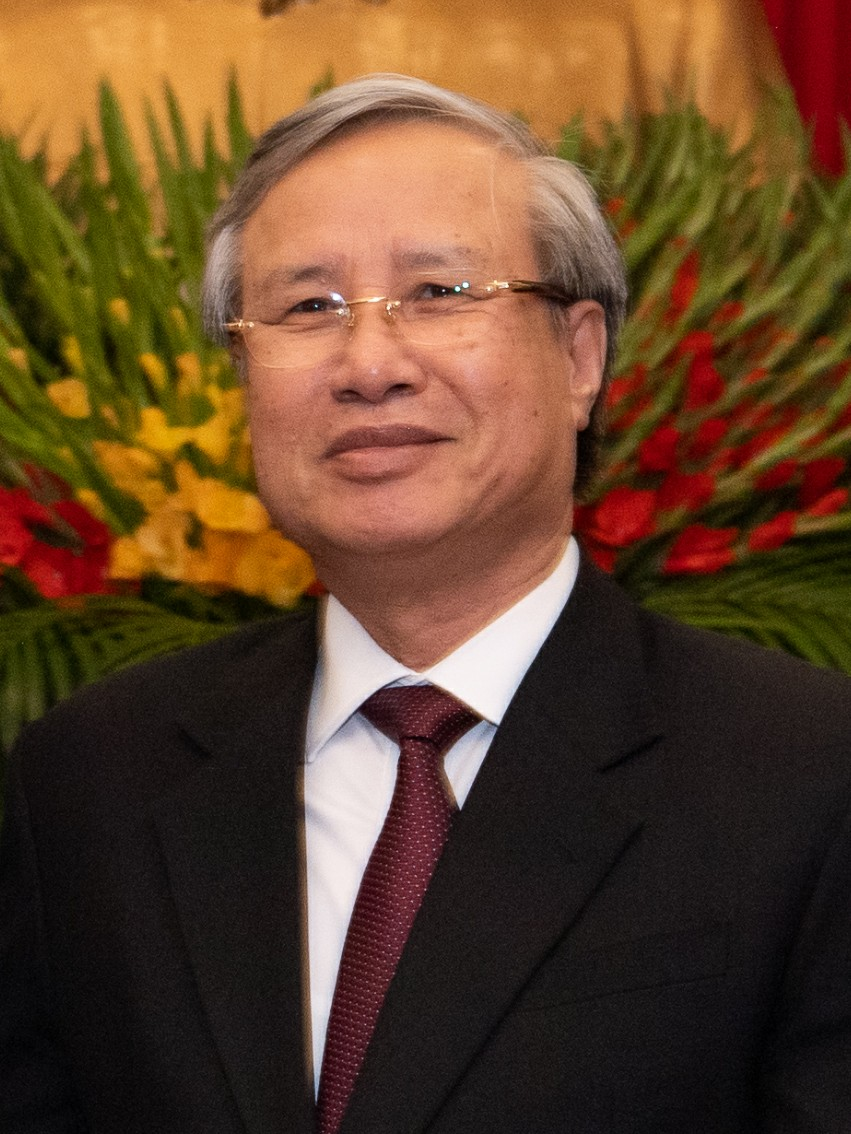

Permanent Member of the Party Central Committee's Secretariat
- In office 2 March 2018 – 6 February 2021; Acting: 1 August 2017 – 2 March 2018
- Preceded by: Đinh Thế Huynh
- Succeeded by: Võ Văn Thưởng

Chairman of the Party's Central Inspection Commission
- In office January 31, 2016 – 9 May 2018
- Preceded by: Ngô Văn Dụ
- Succeeded by: Trần Cẩm Tú

Chief of Office of the Party Central Committee
- In office 4 August 2011 – 4 February 2016
- Preceded by: Ngô Văn Dụ
- Succeeded by: Nguyễn Văn Nên

Prosecutor General of the Supreme People's Procuracy of Vietnam
- In office 25 July 2007 – 26 July 2011
- Preceded by: Nguyễn Hòa Bình
- Succeeded by: Hà Mạnh Trí

Personal details
- Born: 5 February 1953 (age 73) Thái Bình, Vietnam
- Party: Communist Party of Vietnam
- Education: Hanoi Procuratorate University; Hanoi Law University; Ho Chi Minh National Academy of Politics
- Occupation: Politician

Trần Quốc Vượng (Vietnamese pronunciation: [t͡ɕən˨˩ kuək̚˧˦ vɨəŋ˧˨ʔ]; born 5 February 1953) is a Vietnamese politician. He was a member of the Politburo of the Communist Party of Vietnam, Permanent Member of the Party Central Committee's Secretariat, Former Deputy Head of Central Steering Committee on Anti-corruption, Member of the National Assembly of Vietnam. He has worked in many units and agencies of the Communist Party of Vietnam and Socialist Republic of Vietnam, serving as Chairman of the Central Inspection Commission of the Communist Party of Vietnam; Head of Central Office of the Communist Party of Vietnam, Secretary of the Party Personnel Committee, Prosecutor General of the Supreme People's Procuracy of Vietnam.

Trần Quốc Vượng is a member of Communist Party of Vietnam, holding a Master of Laws and Advanced Political Theory. He has been holding various senior positions since 2006, being a member of 10th, 11th, 12th Central Committee of the Communist Party of Vietnam and a member of the National Assembly of Vietnam.

== Background and education ==
Trần Quốc Vượng was born on 5 February 1953 in An Ninh commune, Tiền Hải District, Thái Bình Province. He grew up and attended high school in his hometown. After that, he majored in Procuracy at the School of Procuracy - the predecessor of Hanoi Procuratorate University. He then majored in Law at Hanoi Law University, receiving a Bachelor of Laws, pursuing postgraduate education and receiving a Master of Laws.

Trần Quốc Vượng was admitted to the Communist Party of Vietnam on 29 August 1979, and became an official member on 29 August 1980. He also attended courses at the Ho Chi Minh National Academy of Politics, receiving an advanced degree in political theory.

== Career ==
=== Supreme People's Procuracy ===
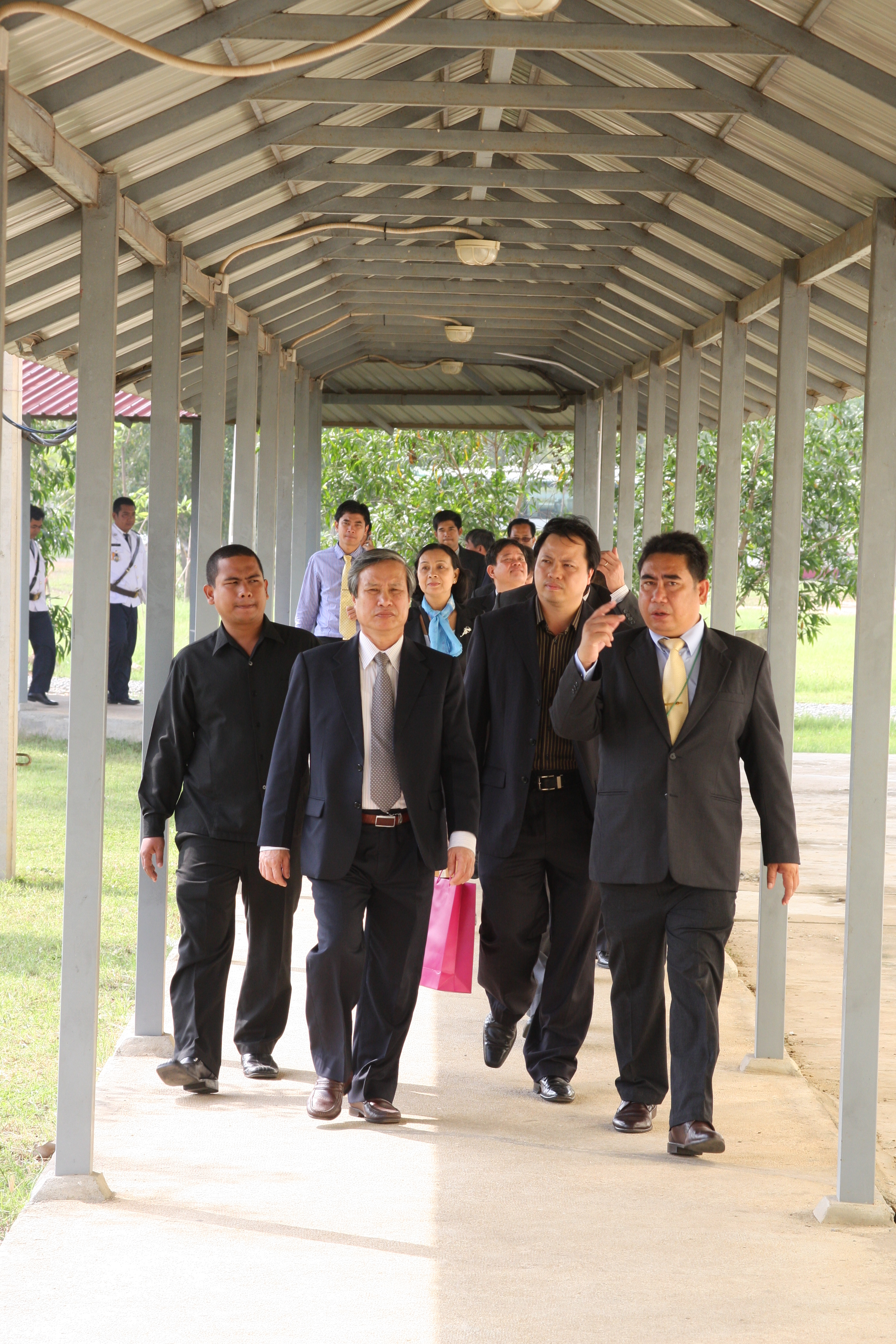
Prosecutor General of the Supreme People's Procuracy Trần Quốc Vượng in Phnom Penh

Trần Quốc Vượng worked for many years under different agencies of the Communist Party of Vietnam and then of the Procuracy. In November 2006, the Central Committee decided to transfer Trần Quốc Vượng from the Central Office of the Communist Party of Vietnam to work at the Supreme People's Procuracy. Secretary of the Central Committee of the Communist Party of Vietnam also appointed him to hold the position of Secretary of the Party Personnel Committee of the Supreme People's Procuracy. In the same month, President Nguyễn Minh Triết decided to appoint him as Standing Deputy Prosecutors General of the Supreme People's Procuracy.

In the first working session, on the morning of 25 July 2007, the Standing Committee of the National Assembly listened to the report summarizing the opinions of the National Assembly members on the expected personnel of the Vice President, The Prime Minister, Chief Justice of the Supreme People's Court, and Prosecutor General of the Supreme People's Procuracy, and decided to approve the appointment of Trần Quốc Vượng as Procurator General of the Supreme People's Procuracy, the eighth Procurator General of Vietnam. He held this position from 2007 to 2011, concurrently held the position of Deputy Chairman of Vietnam Lawyers Association.

=== Communist Party of Vietnam ===
==== Central Office of the Communist Party of Vietnam ====
Before 2006, Trần Quốc Vượng worked at the Central Office of the Communist Party of Vietnam. On 24 May 2006, he was elected a member of the 10th Central Committee of the Communist Party of Vietnam, holding the position of Deputy Head of Central Office of the Communist Party of Vietnam.

On 18 January 2011, at the 11th National Congress of the Communist Party of Vietnam, he was elected a member of the 11th Central Committee of the Communist Party of Vietnam. In July 2011, Politburo of the Communist Party of Vietnam decided to transfer him from the Supreme People's Procuracy back to the Central Office of the Party, holding the position of Head of Central Office of the Communist Party of Vietnam. On 11 May 2013, Trần Quốc Vượng was elected to Secretariat of the Communist Party of Vietnam.

==== Central Inspection Commission ====
In the 12th term, Trần Quốc Vượng continued to work at the Party Central Committee. On 26 January 2016, Trần Quốc Vượng was elected a member of the 12th Central Committee of the Communist Party of Vietnam. On 27 January 2016, he was elected to be a member of Politburo of the Communist Party of Vietnam and Chairman of the Central Inspection Commission of the Communist Party of Vietnam.

On 4 February 2016, Trần Quốc Vượng was assigned by the Politburo to become a member of Secretariat of the Communist Party of Vietnam. On 9 May 2018, he was approved to resign from the position Chairman of the Central Inspection Commission of the Communist Party of Vietnam and member of the 12th Central Committee of Inspection. He then held the position of Chairman of the Inspection Committee for the period 2016 – 2018.

==== Permanent Member of the Party Central Committee's Secretariat ====
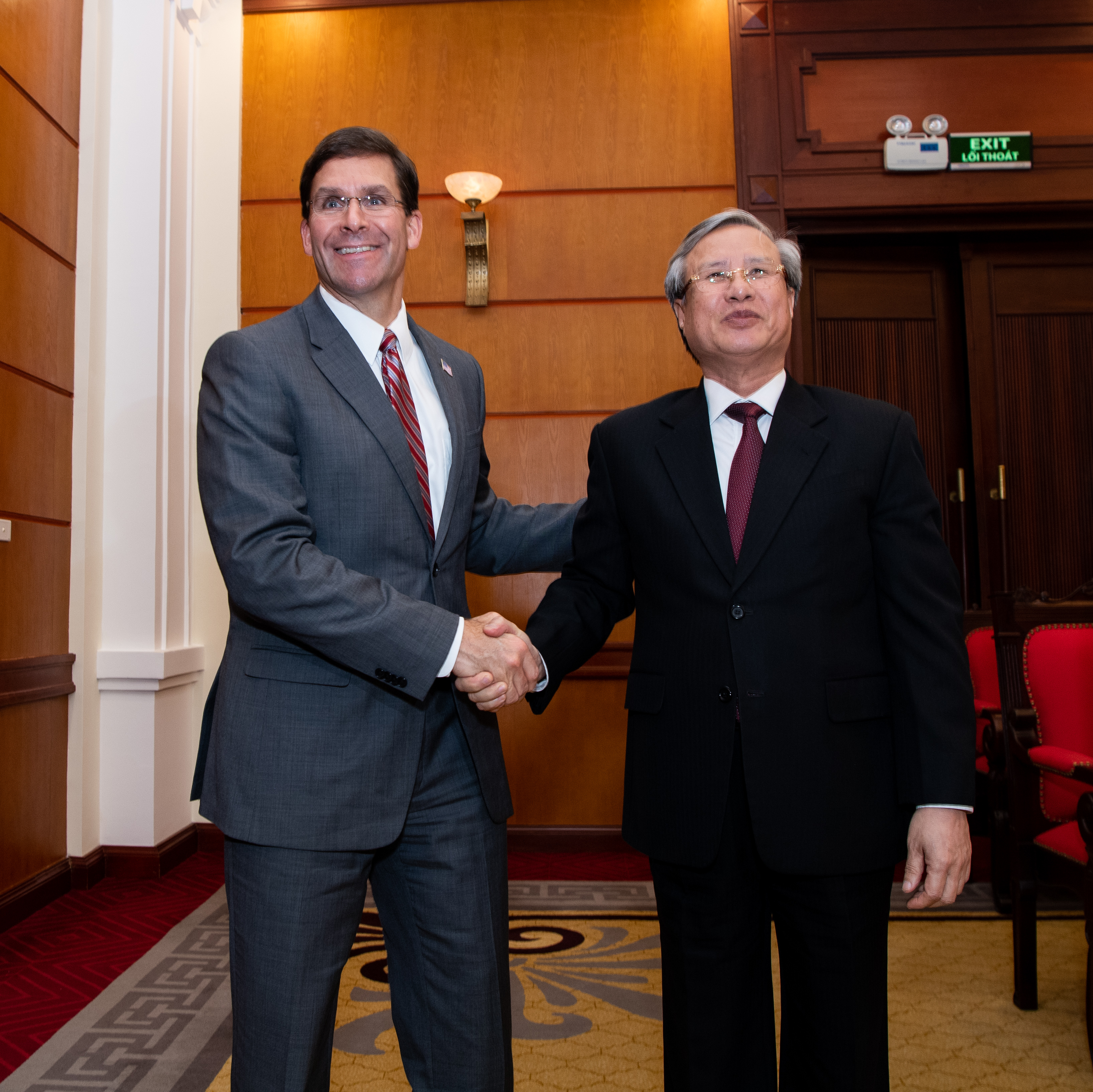
United States Secretary of Defense Mark T. Esper met with Trần Quốc Vượng, during his visit to Hanoi, Vietnam, Nov. 20, 2019.

On 1 August 2017, Trần Quốc Vượng was assigned to be a Permanent Member of the Party Central Committee's Secretariat while Đinh Thế Huynh went for medical treatment. On 2 March 2018, the Politburo decided to dismiss Đinh Thế Huynh from holding the position of Permanent member of the Central Committee's Secretariat and Chairman of the Central Theoretical Council of the Communist Party of Vietnam for long-term medical treatment. On 5 March 2018, the Politburo issued a decision to appoint Trần Quốc Vượng a Permanent member of the CPV Central Committee's Secretariat, succeeding Đinh Thế Huynh.

Trần Quốc Vượng was in charge of and presiding over the daily work of the Secretariat of the Communist Party of Vietnam, on behalf of the General Secretary of the Central Committee of the Communist Party of Vietnam when the General Secretary was absent, as well as in charge of public affairs of the Central Committee, directly went to localities to direct the activities of the local Party Committees. He was also in charge of foreign affairs on behalf of the Communist Party of Vietnam, including traveling to many countries and meet with foreign politicians visiting Vietnam.

After the XIII National Congress (2021), Trần resigned from his position as Standing Committee of the Central Committee of the Communist Party of Vietnam and retired under the regime.

=== National Assembly ===
==== 12th National Assembly ====
Trần Quốc Vượng has been a Member of the National Assembly of Vietnam since 2007. In 2007, he was a Member of the 12th National Assembly of Vietnam, a member of to Lai Châu Delegation to the National Assembly.

==== 13th National Assembly ====
In 2011, Trần Quốc Vượng was a member of the 13th National Assembly of Vietnam, a member of the Tiền Giang Delegation to the National Assembly.

==== 14th National Assembly ====
Trần Quốc Vượng is a member of the 14th National Assembly of Vietnam, Yên Bái Delegation. He was elected as a member of the 14th National Assembly of Vietnam on 22 May 2016 in the second constituency of Yên Bái Province, which included the town of Nghĩa Lộ and 4 districts: Văn Chấn District, Trạm Tấu District, Mù Cang Chải District, and Văn Yên District. He got 248,249 votes, 94.18% of the total valid votes.

On 22 and 23 May 2017, he had a meeting with voters in Trạm Tấu District and Nghĩa Lộ town to report on the results of the third session, the 14th National Assembly.

== Awards and honors ==
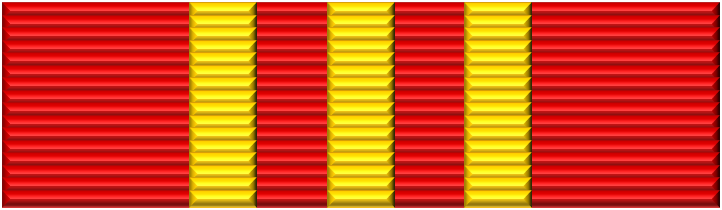
- Order of Ho Chi Minh (2025)
