= Trần Cẩm Tú =

Vietnamese politician (born 1961)

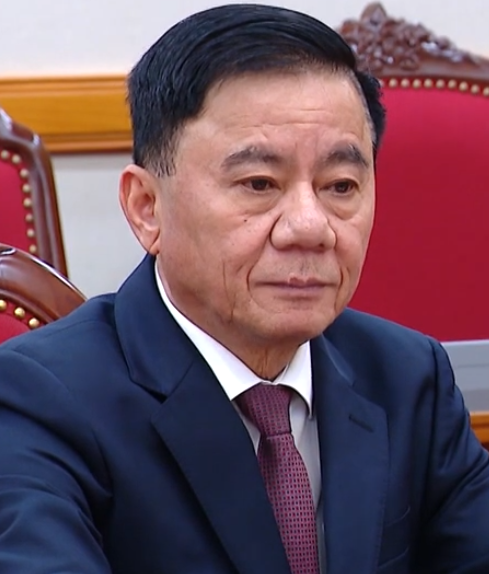
- Tú in 2024

Permanent Member of the Secretariat
- Incumbent
- Assumed office 25 October 2024
- General Secretary: Tô Lâm
- Preceded by: Lương Cường

Chairman of the Central Inspection Commission of the Communist Party of Vietnam
- In office 8 May 2018 – 23 January 2025
- Preceded by: Trần Quốc Vượng
- Succeeded by: Nguyễn Duy Ngọc

Vice Chairman of the Central Inspection Commission
- In office 6 March 2015 – 9 May 2018
- Chairman: Ngô Văn Dụ; Trần Quốc Vượng
- In office 19 January 2011 – 20 August 2011
- Chairman: Ngô Văn Dụ

Party Secretary of Thái Bình
- In office 20 August 2011 – 6 March 2015
- Preceded by: Nguyễn Hạnh Phúc
- Succeeded by: Phạm Văn Sinh

Personal details
- Born: 25 August 1961 (age 65) Hà Tĩnh, North Vietnam
- Party: Communist Party of Vietnam
- Education: Vietnam National University of Forestry; Ho Chi Minh National Academy of Politics
- Occupation: Politician

Trần Cẩm Tú (Vietnamese pronunciation: [tɕɤ˨˩n̪ kɤ˧˩˧m t̪u˧˥]; born 25 August 1961) is a Vietnamese politician. He is a Permanent Member of the Secretariat and was a Chairman of the Central Inspection Commission of the Communist Party of Vietnam. He is also a Vice Chairmen of Central Steering Committee on Anti-corruption.

Trần Cẩm Tú is a member of the Communist Party of Vietnam, holds a Doctorate in Agriculture and Advanced Political Theory.

== Early life and education ==
Trần Cẩm Tú was born on August 25, 1961, in Sơn Bằng Commune, Hương Sơn District, Hà Tĩnh, North Vietnam. In 1979, after graduating from high school at Lê Hữu Trác I High School, Trần Cẩm Tú began working as a laborer at Huong Son Forestry Company. In 1983, he enrolled at Vietnam National University of Forestry. (Note: Vietnam National University of Forestry (VNUF), originally established as the University of Forestry in 1964, is now located in Xuan Mai Town, Chương Mỹ District, Hanoi.) In 1988, he graduated as a Forestry Engineer and was assigned to Hương Sơn Forestry in Hà Tĩnh.

During his tenure at Hương Sơn Forestry, he pursued doctoral research and successfully defended his Ph.D. dissertation in Agriculture titled "Study on the Structural Characteristics and Growth of Naturally Regenerated Forests after Logging as a Basis for Proposing Silvicultural Treatments in Forest Regulation in Huong Son, Ha Tinh." (Nghiên cứu đặc điểm cấu trúc và tăng trưởng rừng tự nhiên phục hồi sau khai thác làm cơ sở đề xuất một số biện pháp xử lý lâm sinh trong điều chế rừng ở Hương Sơn Hà Tĩnh). He completed his Ph.D. at the Vietnam University of Forestry in 1999.

After that, he attended courses at the Ho Chi Minh National Academy of Politics and obtained an Advanced Degree in Political Theory.

== Career ==
=== Economics - technical activities ===
After graduating from the Vietnam University of Forestry in 1988, he returned to work at Hương Sơn Forestry, a state-owned company responsible for forest product exploitation and forestry production—supporting logistics during wartime and agro-forestry economics, during peacetime. (Note: Hương Sơn Forestry was established in March 1955, now is Hương Sơn Forestry and Service Company, Hà Tĩnh) Throughout his career, he held various positions within the enterprise, including assistant, deputy head of department, head of department, and eventually Director of Huong Son Forestry and Services One-Member Limited Liability Company, before transitioning into politics.

=== Political activities in Hà Tĩnh ===
In 2004, he moved to work at the People's Committee of Hương Sơn District and was appointed chairman of the district's People's Committee. In the same year, he was elected as a Deputy of the Hà Tĩnh Provincial People's Council for the 15th tenure (2004–2011) but was relieved of this position on June 23, 2009, to take on a new assignment.

In 2005, at the Hương Sơn District Party Congress, he was elected Secretary of the Huong Son District Party Committee. By the end of 2005, at the Hà Tĩnh Provincial Party Congress, he was elected a member of the Ha Tinh Provincial Party Committee and became a representative of the Hà Tĩnh Provincial Party Delegation to the National Party Congress.

In Hanoi, at the 10th National Congress, he was elected an alternate member of the 10th Central Committee of the Communist Party of Vietnam. Following the congress, during the 10th tenure, he was appointed by the Central Committee as a member of the Standing Committee of the Hà Tĩnh Provincial Party Committee and Chairman of the Hà Tĩnh Provincial Party Inspection Committee, beginning his work in inspection and discipline within the Communist Party of Vietnam.

=== Secretary of Thái Bình Provincial Party Committee ===
In August 2011, the Politburo assigned him to work in Thái Bình. Tô Huy Rứa, Politburo Member, Secretary of the Party Central Committee, and Head of the Organisation Commission of the Communist Party of Vietnam, along with representatives from the Organisation Commission of the Communist Party of Vietnam and the Central Inspection Commission, held a meeting with the Thái Bình Provincial Party Executive Committee to announce and present the Politburo's decision to assign him to the Provincial Party Executive Committee, Provincial Party Standing Committee, appointing him as Secretary of the Thái Bình Provincial Party Committee. Trần Cẩm Tú began his tenure leading the comprehensive development of Thái Bình Province during the 2011–2015 term of the 11th Party Congress.

=== Central Inspection Commission and Secretariat ===
In January 2009, at the 9th Plenary Session of the 10th Party Central Committee, the Central Committee issued a conclusion and passed a resolution to strengthen the Party and State personnel work. As part of this, Trần Cẩm Tú was additionally elected as a member of the Party Central Inspection Commission.

In January 2011, at the 11th National Congress of the Communist Party of Vietnam, he was elected as a member of the 11th Party Central Committee. After that, he was appointed Vice Chairman of the Central Inspection Commission.

In January 2015, at the 10th Plenary Session of the 11th Party Central Committee, he was once again elected as an additional member of the Party Central Inspection Commission. Following this, he was appointed Vice Chairmen of the Party Central Inspection Commission and stepped down from his position as Secretary of the Thái Bình Provincial Party Committee. On January 26, 2016, at the 12th National Congress of the Communist Party of Vietnam, he was elected as a member of the 12th Central Committee and appointed Vice Chairman of the Central Inspection Commission. He was later assigned as the Standing Vice Chairman of the Central Inspection Commission, serving under Politburo Member and Chairman of the Commission, Trần Quốc Vượng.

On May 9, 2018, at the 7th Plenary Session of the 12th Central Committee, he was elected Chairman of the Central Inspection Commission and additionally elected as a member of the Secretariat of the 12th Central Committee. Succeeding Trần Quốc Vượng, he became the head of the Central Inspection Commission, overseeing the Party's central inspection and supervision work. He carried out the duties and powers stipulated in the Party Charter and advised the Central Committee, the Politburo, and the Secretariat on directing, guiding, and implementing inspection, supervision, and disciplinary enforcement within the Party. His role was crucial in ensuring the principles and direction of the Party, the State, and the nation of Vietnam.

On October 25, 2024, at the Office of CPV, the Politburo and the Secretariat held a ceremony to announce the decision to appoint Trần Cẩm Tú, Politburo Member, Secretary of the Party Central Committee, and Chairman of the Central Inspection Commission, as Permanent Member of the Secretariat, replacing Lương Cường, Politburo Member and former Permanent Member of the Secretariat, who had been elected President of Vietnam by the National Assembly.

=== Member of Politburo ===
On January 30, 2021, during the election session of the 13th National Congress of the Communist Party of Vietnam, he was elected as an official member of the 13th Central Committee. On January 31, at the first Plenary Session, he was elected as a Politburo member and re-elected as Chairman of the Central Inspection Commission for the 13th tenure. He also continued to serve in the 13th Secretariat after being assigned by the Politburo, along with several other Politburo members.

=== Permanent Member of the Secretariat ===
On October 25, 2024, at the Office of Communist Party Vietnam Central Committee, the Politburo and the Secretariat held a ceremony to announce the decision to appoint Trần Cẩm Tú — Politburo Member, Secretary of the Central Committee, and Chairman of the Party Central Inspection Commission—as Permanent Member of the Secretariat. On January 23, 2025, Trần Cẩm Tú was relieved of his position as Chairman of the Central Inspection Commission to focus on his role as Permanent Member of the Secretariat. His successor is Senior Lieutenant General Nguyễn Duy Ngọc from the Ministry of Public Security.
