= 13th Secretariat of the Communist Party of Vietnam =

Secretariat of Vietnam's Communist Party

The 13th Secretariat of the Communist Party of Vietnam (CPV), formally the 13th Secretariat of the Central Committee of the Communist Party of Vietnam (Vietnamese: Ban Bí thư Ban Chấp hành Trung ương Đảng Cộng sản Việt Nam Khoá XIII), was partly elected by the 1st Session of the 13th Politburo and partly elected by the 1st Plenary Session of the 13th Central Committee in the immediate aftermath of the 13th National Congress. Nguyễn Phú Trọng was re-elected for his third term as General Secretary of the Communist Party of Vietnam, a position he has held since 2011.

== Members ==
Members of the 13th Secretariat of the Communist Party of Vietnam
Rank	Name	12th SEC		Birth	PM	Birthplace	Education	Ethnicity	Gender	Ref.
Rank	Name	New	Rank	Birth	PM	Birthplace	Education	Ethnicity	Gender	Ref.
1	Nguyễn Phú Trọng	Old	1	1944	1968	Hà Nội City	Graduate	Kinh	Male	
2	Võ Văn Thưởng	Old	5	1970	1993	Vĩnh Long province	Graduate	Kinh	Male	
3	Trương Thị Mai	Old	6	1958	1985	Quảng Bình province	Graduate	Kinh	Female	
4	Trần Cẩm Tú	Old	13	1961	1990	Hà Tĩnh province	Graduate	Kinh	Male	
5	Phan Đình Trạc	Old	11	1958	1980	Nghệ An province	Undergraduate	Kinh	Male	
6	Nguyễn Hòa Bình	Old	8	1958	1981	Quảng Ngãi province	Graduate	Kinh	Male	
7	Lê Minh Hưng	New	—	1970	2000	Hà Tĩnh province	Graduate	Kinh	Male	
8	Nguyễn Trọng Nghĩa	New	—	1962	1982	Tiền Giang province	Undergraduate	Kinh	Male	
9	Đỗ Văn Chiến	New	—	1962	1986	Tuyên Quang province	Graduate	Sán Dìu	Male	
10	Bùi Thị Minh Hoài	New	—	1965	1991	Hà Nam province	Graduate	Kinh	Female	
11	Lê Minh Khái	New	—	1964	1990	Bạc Liêu province	Graduate	Kinh	Male	

== Bibliography ==
- Truong, Mai (2022). "Declining opportunities for speaking out: The impact of Vietnam's new leadership on grassroots collective action". Asian Journal of Comparative Politics. OnlineFirst. doi:10.1177/20578911221139764. S2CID 254009559.
