= Central Inspection Commission of the Communist Party of Vietnam =

The Central Inspection Commission of the Central Committee of the Communist Party of Vietnam was established in 1948 by a decision of the Central Committee, and is responsible for combating corruption, disciplining members and wrongdoing in general. It is the only organ within the party that can sentence or condemn party members. It is responsible to the Politburo and the Secretariat in between sessions of the Central Committee. The commission chairman is by right a member of the Politburo.

== Chairmen ==
- Trần Đăng Ninh (1948–1951)
- Hồ Tùng Mậu (1951–1956)
- Nguyễn Lương Bằng (1956–1976)
- Song Hào (1976–1982)
- Trần Kiên (1982–1991)
- Đỗ Quang Thắng (1991–1996)
- Nguyễn Thị Xuân Mỹ (1996–2001)
- Lê Hồng Anh (2001–2003)
- Nguyễn Văn Chi (2003–2011)
- Ngô Văn Dụ (2011–2016)
- Trần Quốc Vượng (2016–2018)
- Trần Cẩm Tú (2018–2025)
- Nguyễn Duy Ngọc (2025)
- Trần Sỹ Thanh (2025–present)
