= Nguyễn Hòa Bình =

Permanent Deputy Prime Minister of Vietnam from 2024 to 2026

His Excellency; Major General; Nguyễn Hòa Bình
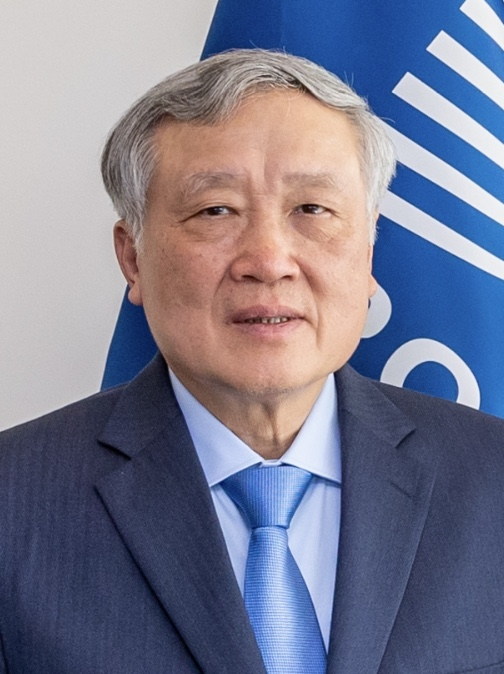
- Bình in 2023

Permanent Deputy Prime Minister of Vietnam
- In office 28 August 2024 – 8 April 2026
- Prime Minister: Phạm Minh Chính
- Preceded by: Phạm Bình Minh
- Succeeded by: Phạm Gia Túc

Chief Justice of the Supreme People's Court
- In office 8 April 2016 – 26 August 2024
- President: See list: Trần Đại Quang; Đặng Thị Ngọc Thịnh (acting); Nguyễn Phú Trọng; Nguyễn Xuân Phúc; Võ Thị Ánh Xuân (acting); Võ Văn Thưởng; Võ Thị Ánh Xuân (acting); Tô Lâm
- Deputy: See list: Bùi Ngọc Hòa; Tống Anh Hào; Nguyễn Sơn; Nguyễn Văn Thuân; Nguyễn Thúy Hiền; Nguyễn Văn Hạnh; Nguyễn Trí Tuệ; Lê Hồng Quang; Nguyễn Văn Du; Dương Văn Thăng; Nguyễn Văn Tiến
- Preceded by: Trương Hòa Bình
- Succeeded by: Lê Minh Trí

Procurator-General of the Supreme People's Procuracy
- In office 26 July 2011 – 8 April 2016
- President: Trương Tấn Sang
- Deputy: See list: Hoàng Nghĩa Mai; Nguyễn Thị Thủy Khiêm; Lê Hữu Thể; Nguyễn Hải Phong; Bùi Mạnh Cường; Trần Công Phàn; Nguyễn Văn Khánh
- Preceded by: Trần Quốc Vượng
- Succeeded by: Lê Minh Trí

Personal details
- Born: 24 May 1958 (age 68) Nghĩa Hành, Quảng Ngãi, South Vietnam (now Vietnam)
- Party: Communist Party of Vietnam (1981–present)
- Spouse: Phùng Nhật Hà
- Education: Vietnam People's Security Academy; Ho Chi Minh National Academy of Politics; Academy of the MVD

Military service
- Branch/service: Vietnam People's Public Security
- Rank: Major general

Nguyễn Hòa Bình (born 24 May 1958) is a Vietnamese politician and former police officer. He served as the Permanent Deputy Prime Minister of Vietnam of the Phạm Minh Chính's cabinet from August 2024 to April 2026. Previously, he held the rank of Major General in the People's Public Security Forces and served as the Chief Justice of the Supreme People's Court from 2014 to 2016. He was also a member of the National Assembly delegation from Bắc Giang (2021–2026).

In the Communist Party of Vietnam, Bình served as a member of the 13th Politburo, the Central Secretariat and the Central Steering Committee on Anti-corruption.

== Early life and education ==
Nguyễn Hòa Bình was born on 24 May 1958, in Hành Đức commune, Nghĩa Hành district, Quảng Ngãi Province. His father was Nguyễn Lựu, a soldier and his brother was Nguyễn Kim Vang, who was awarded the Hero of the People's Armed Forces title.

From 1975 to 1980, he studied at Vietnam People's Security Academy. In 1988, he went to Moscow to complete a postgraduate law study. In 1991, Bình successfully defended his Doctor of Law thesis titled "Организация предупреждения хищений социалистического имущества на водном транспорте"

== Career ==
In 1980, Bình worked as a police officer in Quảng Nam - Đà Nẵng province. He joined the CPV on 14 October 1981. After returning from a 4-year study in the Soviet Union, on 1992, he worked as a member of the Ministry of Public Security up to 2008. In April 2007, he became a Major General.

In April 2008, Bình was moved to Quảng Ngãi and become the deputy secretary of the province's party committee. On 5 June 2010, Bình was elected as Quảng Ngãi's party secretary and was reelected on September during the province's party congress.

In 2011, Bình was elected to the 13th National Assembly. On 26 July 2011, Bình was elected by the National Assembly to be the Procurator-General of the Supreme People's Procuracy. In 2016, Bình was reelected to the 14th National Assembly and became the Chief Justice of the Supreme People's Court. In 2021, Bình was reelected again for the National Assembly and remained as Chief Justice. On 26 August 2024, he was dismissed from Chief Justice by President Tô Lâm and was elected by the 15th National Assembly as a Deputy Prime Minister for Phạm Minh Chính's cabinet. Two days later, Bình became the Permanent Deputy Prime Minister.

== History of military rank conferment ==
Year of ordination	1983	1987	1991	1995	1999	2003	2007
Rank							
Rank name	Senior lieutenant	Captain	Major	Lieutenant colonel	Colonel	Senior colonel	Major General
