= Central Theoretical Council of the Communist Party of Vietnam =

The Central Theoretical Council of the Central Committee of the Communist Party of Vietnam (Vietnamese: Hội đồng Lý luận Trung ương Đảng Cộng sản Việt Nam) was established on 22 October 1996 by a decision of the Central Committee, and is responsible for conceiving and developing the party's Marxist theoretical standpoint. It is responsible to the Politburo and the Secretariat in between sessions of the Central Committee and the party's National Congress.

The 4th Central Theoretical Council was formed on 7 September 2016 and is currently headed by Politburo member Nguyễn Xuân Thắng. It is composed of 44 members, mostly from academic circles or from the Central Propaganda Department.

== Chairmen ==
- Nguyễn Đức Bình (1996–2001)
- Nguyễn Phú Trọng (2001–2006)
- Tô Huy Rứa (2006–2011)
- Đinh Thế Huynh (2011–2018)
- Nguyễn Xuân Thắng (2018–present)
