= Chairman of the Central Inspection Commission of the Communist Party of Vietnam =

Head of the Communist Party of Vietnam's disciplinary body

The Chairman of the Central Inspection Commission of the Communist Party of Vietnam is the official responsible for investigating corruption and maintaining discipline within the party.

== Officeholders ==
No. (Note: These numbers are not official.)	Name (birth–death)	Took office	Left office	Rank (Note: The Central Committee when it convenes for its first session after being elected by a National Party Congress elects the Politburo. According to David Koh, in interviews with several high-standing Vietnamese officials, the Politburo ranking is based upon the number of approval votes by the Central Committee. Lê Hồng Anh, the Minister of Public Security, was ranked 2nd in the 10th Politburo because he received the second-highest number of approval votes. Another example is Tô Huy Rứa of the 10th Politburo; he was ranked lowest because he received the lowest approval vote of the 10th Central Committee when he stood for election for a seat in the Politburo. This system was implemented at the 1st plenum of the 10th Central Committee. The Politburo ranking functioned as an official order of precedence before the 10th Party Congress, and some believe it still does.)	National Congress
1	Trần Đăng Ninh (1910–1955)	October 1948	19 February 1951	—	1st National Congress (1935–1951)
2	Hồ Tùng Mậu (1896–1951)	March 1951	23 July 1951	—	2nd National Congress (1951–1960)
3	Nguyễn Lương Bằng (1904–1979)	April 1956	20 December 1976	—	2nd National Congress (1951–1960); 3rd National Congress (1960–1976)
4	Song Hào (1917–2004)	20 December 1976	31 March 1982	—	4th National Congress (1976–1982)
5	Trần Kiên (1920–2003)	31 March 1982	27 June 1991	—	5th National Congress (1982–1986)
5	Trần Kiên (1920–2003)	31 March 1982	27 June 1991	—	6th National Congress (1986–1991)
6	Đỗ Quang Thắng (1927–2009)	27 June 1991	1 July 1996	17	7th National Congress (1991–1996)
7	Nguyễn Thị Xuân Mỹ (born 1940)	1 July 1996	22 April 2001	14	8th National Congress (1996–2001)
8	Lê Hồng Anh (born 1949)	22 April 2001	January 2002	12	9th National Congress (2001–2006)
9	Nguyễn Văn Chi (born 1945)	January 2002	19 January 2011	—	9th National Congress (2001–2006)
9	Nguyễn Văn Chi (born 1945)	January 2002	19 January 2011	14	10th National Congress (2006–2011)
10	Ngô Văn Dụ (born 1947)	19 January 2011	28 January 2016	12	11th National Congress (2011–2016)
11	Trần Quốc Vượng (born 1953)	28 January 2016	9 May 2018	12	12th National Congress (2016–2021)
12	Trần Cẩm Tú (born 1961)	9 May 2018	23 January 2025	12	12th National Congress (2016–2021)
12	Trần Cẩm Tú (born 1961)	9 May 2018	23 January 2025	13	13th National Congress (2021–2026)
13	Nguyễn Duy Ngọc (born 1964)	23 January 2025	5 November 2025	13	13th National Congress (2021–2026)
14	Trần Sỹ Thanh (born 1971)	5 November 2025	Incumbent	13	13th National Congress (2021–2026)
15	Trần Sỹ Thanh (born 1971)	23 January 2026	Incumbent	14	14th National Congress (2026–2031)

== Bibliography ==
- Koh, David (July–August 2008). "Leadership Changes at the 10th Congress of the Vietnamese Communist Party". Asian Survey. 48 (4). University of California Press: 650–672. doi:10.1525/as.2008.48.4.650. JSTOR 10.1525/as.2008.48.4.650.
- Van, Canh Nguyen; Cooper, Earle (1983). Vietnam under Communism, 1975–1982. Hoover Press. ISBN 9780817978518.
