= Phan Đình Trạc =

Vietnamese politician

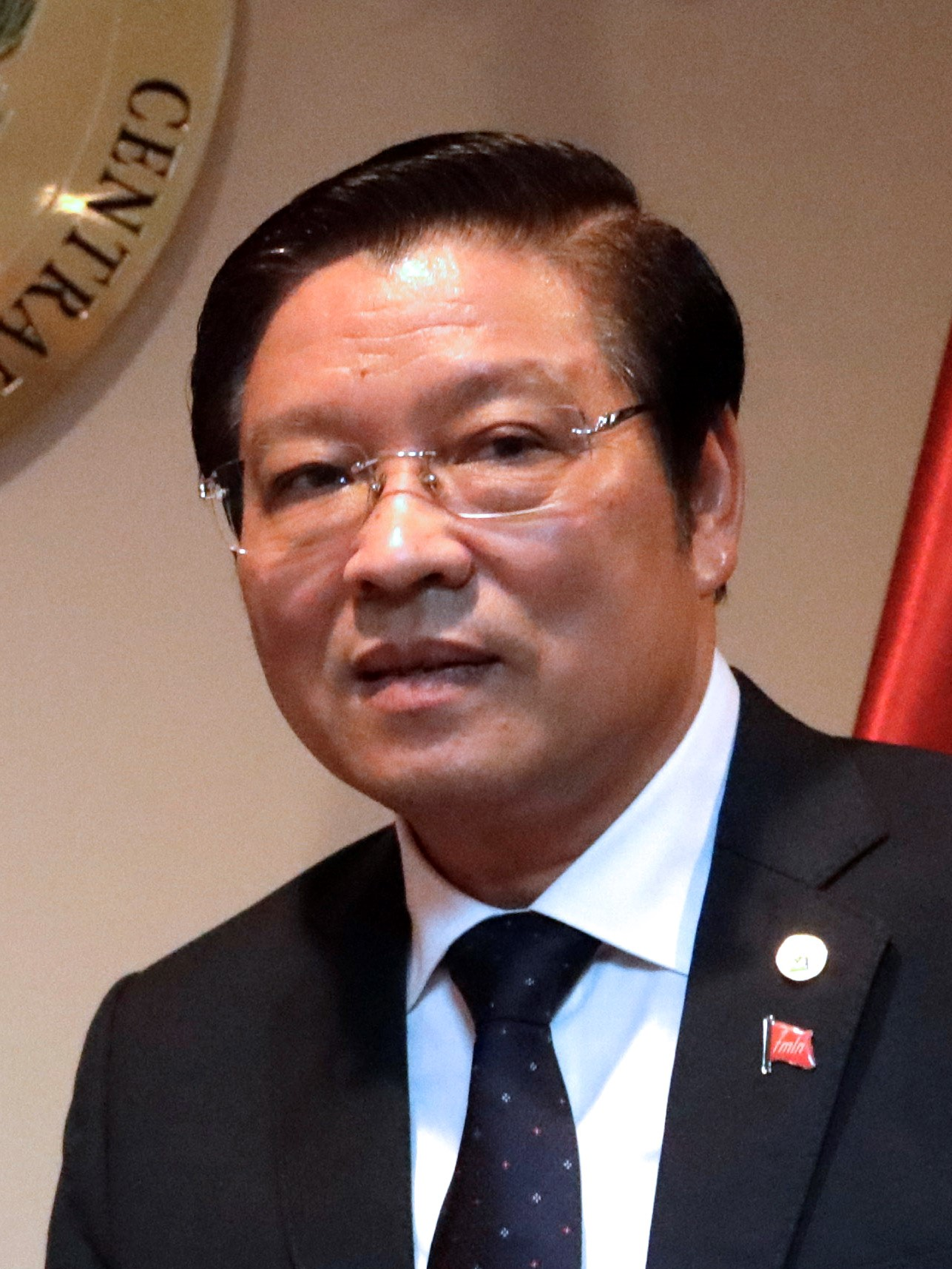
Phan Đình Trạc

Phan Đình Trạc (Vietnamese pronunciation: [faːn˧˧ ʔɗïŋ˨˩ t͡ɕaːk̚˧˨ʔ]; born 25 August 1958) is a Vietnamese politician, from Diễn Châu district, Nghệ An province. He has been a member of the Communist Party of Vietnam since 4 August 1980. He is a Politburo member, Secretary of the Party Central Committee, Chairperson of the Communist Party of Vietnam's Commission for Internal Affairs.
