= Central Secretariat of the Communist Party of Vietnam =

Highest implementation body of the Party

Central Secretariat of the Communist Party of Vietnam Ban Bí thư Trung ương Đảng Cộng sản Việt Nam

Information
- General Secretary: Tô Lâm
- Permanent Member: Trần Cẩm Tú
- Elected by: Central Committee
- Responsible to: Central Committee
- Seats: 13 (see 14th Secretariat)

The Central Secretariat of the Communist Party of Vietnam (Vietnamese: Ban Bí thư Trung ương Đảng Cộng sản Việt Nam), replaced by the Politburo Standing of the Central Committee in the period 1996 to 2001, is the highest implementation body of the Communist Party of Vietnam (CPV) between Central Committee meetings. According to Party rules, the Secretariat implements the decisions of the Politburo and the Central Committee.

The members of the Politburo are elected (and given a ranking) by the Central Committee in the immediate aftermath of a National Party Congress. The 13th Secretariat was elected by the Central Committee in the aftermath of the 13th National Congress and consists of 12 members. The first-ranked member was Tô Lâm, the General Secretary of the Central Committee. In 2026, 13 members were elected to the 14th Secretariat, Tô Lâm was still the first-ranked member.
