= 11th National Congress of the Communist Party of Vietnam =

Election of top leadership of Communist Party of Vietnam

- Flag of the Communist Party of Vietnam
- Date: 12–19 January 2011
- Location: Vietnam National Convention Center
- Participants: 1,377
- Outcome: The election of the 11th Central Committee

The 11th National Congress of the Communist Party of Vietnam (Vietnamese: Đại hội đại biểu toàn quốc lần thứ XI, 11th National Congress of Delegates) was the eleventh party congress of the Communist Party of Vietnam, the sole legal party of Vietnam; it occurred between 12 and 19 January 2011, at the My Dinh National Convention Centre, Hanoi.

== Revising the party platform ==
The platform which existed before the 11th Congress had remained unchanged since 7th Congress (held in 1991). The work on revising the platform began two-and-a-half years before the 11th Congress. Nguyễn Phú Trọng, due to his position as rector of Hồ Chí Minh National Academy of Politics, was asked by the 10th Politburo to head the drafting committee responsible for drafting the new platform. Another reason was that Nông Đức Mạnh supported Nguyễn Phú Trọng possible future candidature for the general secretaryship.

The drafting of the platform was a collective effort guided by high-standing party bureaucrats and officials from think tanks. However, there was wide participation from the intelligentsia. There was some criticism on the end product – a clause stated that all the means of production was to be owned by the state. When the draft version was presented to the 14th plenum of the 10th Central Committee, critics saw it as a step backward because since the 6th Congress, diversified ownership of the means of production had been recognized. Another point was that it alarmed external and internal investors. The 14th plenum eventually decided to include another clause which acknowledged the diversified ownership of the means of production. At the 11th National Congress, the issue was put to a vote, and 65.04 percent supported the motion of removing the clause which did not recognize the diversified ownership of the means of production. Even if it had stayed, it wouldn't have hurt the party. Another clause stated that Vietnam's goal was to "develop a market economy with socialist orientations, which would have many forms of ownership, many parts, many forms of businesses, and many ways of distribution in the economy."

== Bibliography ==
- Koh, David (2012). "Vietnam: A Glass Half Full or Half Empty?". Southeast Asian Affairs. 2012 (1). Institute of Southeast Asian Studies: 361–378.
