= Members of the 12th Central Committee of the Communist Party of Vietnam =

Central Committee of the Communist Party of Vietnam

12th Central Committee
- Symbol of the Communist Party of Vietnam

27 January 2016 – 31 January 2021 (5 years, 4 days) Overview
- Type: Central Committee of the Communist Party of Vietnam
- Election: 12th National Congress

Members
- Total: 180 members
- Newcomers: 81 members (12th)
- Old: 81 members (11th)
- Reelected: 103 members (13th)
- Removed: 5 members

On 27 January 2016, the 12th National Congress elected 180 individuals to serve as members of the 12th Central Committee of the Communist Party of Vietnam (CPV) for the electoral term 2016–2021. The Central Committee is the highest decision-making institution in the CPV and Vietnam when the Party's National Congress and the Politburo are adjourned. In between congresses, the Central Committee is responsible for organising and directing the implementation of the Party's Political Platform, Charter, and resolutions adopted at the National Congress. Furthermore, it adopts guidelines and policies in all relevant fields, domestic or foreign. In addition, the sitting Central Committee is responsible for convening the next National Congress. Members of the Central Committee have the right to elect and remove the General Secretary of the Central Committee as well as members of the Politburo, the Secretariat and the Central Inspection Commission (CIC). When the Central Committee is not in session, it delegates its powers to these three elected organs which then report on their activities the next time the Central Committee convenes for a meeting. Central Committee members are responsible to and report on their work to the Central Committee.

81 members had served in the 11th Central Committee (11th CC). Moreover, another 18 members had served as alternates of the 11th CC. Of these 99 members, seven had served in the 11th Politburo. The remaining 81 members were newcomers. Of the 180 members, 17 were women. Upon their election, 12 members were 61 years or older, 142 members were in the age group 51–60 and seven were in the age group 46–49. 19 members were 45 years of age or younger, of which Nguyễn Xuân Anh (aged 40) and Nguyen Thanh Nghi (aged 39) were the two youngest, both being born in 1976. Hà Tĩnh province had the highest provincial representation on the Central Committee with its sixteen members. The Ministry of Defence had twenty representatives, and the Ministry of Public Security had five. Twelve members had work experience in the Vietnam People's Public Security police force.

The 12th National Congress adopted a resolution that stated the CPV needed to combat political corruption within the party, state, and society at large resolutely. Shortly after his re-election as General Secretary on 27 January 2016, Nguyễn Phú Trọng ramped up his anti-corruption campaign. As a result, five members were removed from the Central Committee and expelled from the CPV: 12th Politburo member Đinh La Thăng, Tất Thành Cang, Nguyễn Xuân Anh, Trương Minh Tuấn and Nguyễn Đức Chung. The two most notable cases were those of Đinh La Thăng and Nguyễn Xuân Anh. Đinh La Thăng was accused of mismanaging the state-owned enterprise PetroVietnam, resulting in a loss of 900 billion Vietnamese dongs (around 40 million United States dollars); he was arrested in December 2017 and sentenced to thirteen years in prison in January 2018. Nguyễn Xuân Anh was accused of violating democratic centralism and being corrupt. This last case received more attention since Nguyễn Xuân Anh was the son of Nguyễn Văn Chi, the CIC Chairman of the 10th and 11th terms. Four officials received disciplinary warnings from the 12th CC and the 12th CIC: Lê Viết Chữ and Trần Quốc Cường, as well as Politburo members Nguyễn Văn Bình and Hoàng Trung Hải. Triệu Tài Vinh, on the other hand, was recommended a disciplinary punishment by the 41st Session of the CIC and received a reprimand by the 12th Politburo in January 2020.

The 13th National Congress re-elected 103 members to serve in the 13th Central Committee, which began in 2021. Of these, ten were given age exemptions. Party regulation state that one needs to be 60 years or younger to be re-elected to the Central Committee, and Võ Văn Dũng, Phan Văn Giang, Lê Minh Trí and Nguyễn Chí Dũng were given exemptions from this rule. Moreover, another rule states that members of the Politburo have to be 65 years or younger to be re-elected, but the 13th National Congress gave age exemptions to Nguyễn Phú Trọng (77 years of age) and Nguyễn Xuân Phúc (67 years of age).

== Members ==
Members of the 12th Central Committee of the Communist Party of Vietnam
Name	11th	13th	Birth	PM	Birthplace	Education	Ethnicity	Gender	Ref.
Chu Ngọc Anh	Alternate	Member	1965	1998	Hà Nội	Graduate	Kinh	Male	
Nguyễn Hoàng Anh	Nonmember	Member	1963	1994	Hải Phòng	Graduate	Kinh	Male	
Nguyễn Thúy Anh	Nonmember	Member	1963	1994	Phú Thọ	Graduate	Kinh	Female	
Nguyễn Xuân Anh	Nonmember	Expelled	1976	2004	Đà Nẵng	Graduate	Kinh	Male	
Trần Tuấn Anh	Nonmember	Member	1964	1996	Quảng Ngãi	Graduate	Kinh	Male	
Hà Ban	Member	Nonmember	1957	—	Quảng Nam	Graduate	Kinh	Male	
Dương Thanh Bình	Member	Member	1961	1981	Cà Mau	Undergraduate	Kinh	Male	
Nguyễn Hòa Bình	Member	Member	1958	1981	Quảng Ngãi	Graduate	Kinh	Male	
Nguyễn Thanh Bình	Member	Nonmember	1957	—	Hà Tĩnh	Undergraduate	Kinh	Male	
Nguyễn Văn Bình	Member	Nonmember	1961	1995	Phú Thọ	Graduate	Kinh	Male	
Phan Thanh Bình	Member	Nonmember	1960	1984	An Giang	Graduate	Kinh	Male	
Trương Hòa Bình	Member	Nonmember	1955	1973	Long An	Graduate	Kinh	Male	
Tất Thành Cang	Alternate	Expelled	1971	1991	Long An	Graduate	Kinh	Male	
Bùi Minh Châu	Nonmember	Member	1961	1993	Phú Thọ	Graduate	Kinh	Male	
Lê Chiêm	Member	Nonmember	1958	1980	Quảng Nam	Graduate	Kinh	Male	
Đỗ Văn Chiến	Member	Member	1962	1986	Tuyên Quang	Graduate	Sán Dìu	Male	
Hà Ngọc Chiến	Member	Nonmember	1957	1980	Cao Bằng	Graduate	Tày	Male	
Hoàng Xuân Chiến	Nonmember	Member	1961	—	Hưng Yên	Graduate	Kinh	Male	
Nguyễn Nhân Chiến	Nonmember	Nonmember	1960	1983	Bắc Ninh	Graduate	Kinh	Male	
Trịnh Văn Chiến	Nonmember	Nonmember	1960	—	Thanh Hóa	Graduate	Kinh	Male	
Mai Văn Chính	Member	Member	1961	1987	Long An	Graduate	Kinh	Male	
Phạm Minh Chính	Member	Member	1958	1986	Thanh Hóa	Graduate	Kinh	Male	
Lê Viết Chữ	Nonmember	Nonmember	1963	1994	Quảng Ngãi	Graduate	Kinh	Male	
Nguyễn Đức Chung	Nonmember	Expelled	1967	1994	Hải Dương	Graduate	Kinh	Male	
Bùi Văn Cường	Alternate	Member	1965	1992	Hải Dương	Undergraduate	Kinh	Male	
Lương Cường	Member	Member	1957	1978	Phú Thọ	Undergraduate	Kinh	Male	
Nguyễn Phú Cường	Alternate	Member	1967	1995	Bình Dương	Graduate	Kinh	Male	
Nguyễn Tân Cương	Alternate	Member	1966	—	Hà Nam	Undergraduate	Kinh	Male	
Nguyễn Xuân Cường	Member	Nonmember	1959	1986	Hà Nội	Undergraduate	Kinh	Male	
Phan Việt Cường	Nonmember	Member	1963	1988	Quảng Nam	Undergraduate	Kinh	Male	
Trần Quốc Cường	Nonmember	Member	1961	1985	Nam Định	Graduate	Kinh	Male	
Vũ Đức Đam	Member	Member	1963	1993	Hải Dương	Graduate	Kinh	Male	
Nguyễn Văn Danh	Nonmember	Member	1962	1981	Tiền Giang	Undergraduate	Kinh	Male	
Huỳnh Thành Đạt	Nonmember	Member	1962	1990	Bến Tre	Graduate	Kinh	Male	
Lê Diễn	Nonmember	Nonmember	1960	1981	Bình Định	Graduate	Kinh	Male	
Nguyễn Hồng Diên	Nonmember	Member	1965	1985	Thái Bình	Graduate	Kinh	Male	
Nguyễn Khắc Định	Nonmember	Member	1964	1988	Thái Bình	Graduate	Kinh	Male	
Trần Đơn	Member	Nonmember	1958	—	Long An	—	Kinh	Male	
Nguyễn Văn Du	Nonmember	Nonmember	1960	—	Bắc Kạn	Undergraduate	Kinh	Male	
Đào Ngọc Dung	Member	Member	1962	1984	Hà Nam	Graduate	Kinh	Male	
Đinh Tiến Dũng	Member	Member	1961	1987	Ninh Bình	Graduate	Kinh	Male	
Mai Tiến Dũng	Member	Nonmember	1959	1980	Hà Nam	Graduate	Kinh	Male	
Nguyễn Chí Dũng	Member	Member	1960	1987	Hà Tĩnh	Graduate	Kinh	Male	
Phan Xuân Dũng	Member	Nonmember	1960	1989	Hà Tĩnh	Graduate	Kinh	Male	
Trần Trí Dũng	Member	Nonmember	1959	1980	Trà Vinh	Undergraduate	Kinh	Male	
Trịnh Đình Dũng	Member	Nonmember	1956	—	Vĩnh Phúc	—	Kinh	Male	
Võ Văn Dũng	Member	Member	1960	1982	Bạc Liêu	Undergraduate	Kinh	Male	
Nguyễn Quang Dương	Nonmember	Member	1962	1984	Hà Nội	Undergraduate	Kinh	Male	
Lê Xuân Duy	Nonmember	Nonmember	1962	1983	Vĩnh Phúc	—	Kinh	Male	
Phan Văn Giang	Nonmember	Member	1960	—	Bến Tre	Graduate	Kinh	Male	
Nguyễn Văn Giàu	Member	Nonmember	1957	1981	An Giang	Graduate	Kinh	Male	
Nguyễn Thị Thu Hà	Member	Member	1970	1997	Ninh Bình	Graduate	Kinh	Female	
Phạm Hồng Hà	Member	Nonmember	1958	1989	Nam Định	Graduate	Kinh	Male	
Trần Hồng Hà	Alternate	Member	1963	1990	Hà Tĩnh	Graduate	Kinh	Male	
Bùi Văn Hải	Nonmember	Nonmember	1960	—	Bắc Giang	Graduate	Kinh	Male	
Hoàng Trung Hải	Member	Nonmember	1959	1990	Thái Bình	Graduate	Kinh	Male	
Nguyễn Đức Hải	Nonmember	Member	1961	1984	Quảng Nam	Graduate	Kinh	Male	
Nguyễn Thanh Hải	Nonmember	Member	1970	2002	Hà Nội	Graduate	Kinh	Female	
Ngô Thị Thanh Hằng	Nonmember	Nonmember	1960	1984	Nam Định	Graduate	Kinh	Female	
Nguyễn Mạnh Hiển	Nonmember	Nonmember	1960	—	Hải Dương	Graduate	Kinh	Male	
Phùng Quốc Hiển	Member	Nonmember	1958	1986	Phú Thọ	Graduate	Kinh	Male	
Bùi Thị Minh Hoài	Member	Member	1965	1991	Hà Nam	Graduate	Kinh	Female	
Lê Minh Hoan	Nonmember	Member	1961	1988	Đồng Tháp	Graduate	Kinh	Male	
Vương Đình Huệ	Member	Member	1957	1984	Nghệ An	Graduate	Kinh	Male	
Lữ Văn Hùng	Nonmember	Member	1963	1981	Hậu Giang	Undergraduate	Kinh	Male	
Nguyễn Mạnh Hùng	Nonmember	Nonmember	1960	—	Hà Tĩnh	Graduate	Kinh	Male	
Nguyễn Mạnh Hùng	Nonmember	Member	1962	1984	Bắc Ninh	Graduate	Kinh	Male	
Nguyễn Văn Hùng	Nonmember	Member	1961	1982	Quảng Trị	Graduate	Kinh	Male	
Nguyễn Văn Hùng	Nonmember	Member	1964	1993	Quảng Nam	Graduate	Kinh	Male	
Lê Minh Hưng	Nonmember	Member	1970	2000	Hà Tĩnh	Graduate	Kinh	Male	
Thuận Hữu	Member	Nonmember	1958	1985	Hà Tĩnh	Graduate	Kinh	Male	
Đinh Thế Huynh	Member	Nonmember	1953	1974	Nam Định	Graduate	Kinh	Male	
Lê Minh Khái	Nonmember	Member	1964	1990	Bạc Liêu	Graduate	Kinh	Male	
Nguyễn Đình Khang	Nonmember	Member	1967	1995	Bắc Ninh	Graduate	Kinh	Male	
Trần Việt Khoa	Nonmember	Member	1965	1985	Vĩnh Phúc	Graduate	Kinh	Male	
Điểu K'Ré	Alternate	Member	1968	1993	Đăk Nông	Graduate	Mnong	Male	
Nguyễn Thế Kỷ	Nonmember	Nonmember	1960	—	Nghệ An	Graduate	Kinh	Male	
Chẩu Văn Lâm	Nonmember	Member	1967	1995	Tuyên Quang	Graduate	Tày	Male	
Tô Lâm	Member	Member	1957	1981	Hưng Yên	Graduate	Kinh	Male	
Hoàng Thị Thúy Lan	Nonmember	Member	1966	1995	Vĩnh Phúc	Graduate	Kinh	Female	
Hầu A Lềnh	Alternate	Member	1973	1994	Lào Cai	Graduate	Hmong	Male	
Ngô Xuân Lịch	Member	Nonmember	1954	1973	Hà Nam	Graduate	Kinh	Male	
Nguyễn Hồng Lĩnh	Alternate	Member	1964	1986	Long An	Undergraduate	Kinh	Male	
Nguyễn Đức Lợi	Nonmember	Nonmember	1960	1990	Quảng Trị	Undergraduate	Kinh	Male	
Nguyễn Văn Lợi	Nonmember	Member	1961	1981	Hồ Chí Minh	Undergraduate	Kinh	Male	
Lê Thành Long	Nonmember	Member	1963	1991	Thanh Hóa	Graduate	Kinh	Male	
Võ Minh Lương	Nonmember	Member	1963	—	Quảng Bình	Undergraduate	Kinh	Male	
Lê Trường Lưu	Nonmember	Member	1963	1992	Thừa Thiên Huế	Graduate	Kinh	Male	
Uông Chu Lưu	Member	Nonmember	1955	1983	Hà Tĩnh	Graduate	Kinh	Male	
Trương Thị Mai	Member	Member	1958	1985	Quảng Bình	Graduate	Kinh	Female	
Phan Văn Mãi	Nonmember	Member	1973	1997	Bến Tre	Graduate	Kinh	Male	
Trần Thanh Mẫn	Member	Member	1962	1982	Hậu Giang	Graduate	Kinh	Male	
Châu Văn Minh	Member	Member	1961	1996	Thừa Thiên Huế	Graduate	Kinh	Male	
Phạm Bình Minh	Member	Member	1959	1984	Nam Định	Graduate	Kinh	Male	
Trần Bình Minh	Member	Nonmember	1958	1992	Hải Dương	Graduate	Kinh	Male	
Lại Xuân Môn	Nonmember	Member	1963	1984	Nam Định	Undergraduate	Kinh	Male	
Giàng Páo Mỷ	Nonmember	Member	1963	1998	Lai Châu	Graduate	Hmong	Female	
Bùi Văn Nam	Member	Nonmember	1955	—	Nam Định	Undergraduate	Kinh	Male	
Nguyễn Phương Nam	Member	Nonmember	1957	—	Cà Mau	Undergraduate	Kinh	Male	
Phạm Hoài Nam	Alternate	Member	1967	—	Bình Định	Graduate	Kinh	Male	
Trần Văn Nam	Nonmember	Member	1963	1986	Bình Dương	Undergraduate	Kinh	Male	
Nguyễn Văn Nên	Member	Member	1957	1978	Tây Ninh	Undergraduate	Kinh	Male	
Lê Thị Nga	Nonmember	Member	1964	1990	Hà Tĩnh	Graduate	Kinh	Female	
Nguyễn Thị Kim Ngân	Member	Nonmember	1954	1981	Bến Tre	Graduate	Kinh	Female	
Nguyễn Thanh Nghị	Alternate	Member	1976	1991	Cà Mau	Graduate	Kinh	Male	
Nguyễn Trọng Nghĩa	Nonmember	Member	1962	1982	Tiền Giang	Undergraduate	Kinh	Male	
Trương Quang Nghĩa	Member	Nonmember	1958	1983	Quảng Nam	Graduate	Kinh	Male	
Phùng Xuân Nhạ	Alternate	Nonmember	1963	1997	Hưng Yên	Graduate	Kinh	Male	
Nguyễn Thiện Nhân	Member	Nonmember	1953	1980	Trà Vinh	Graduate	Kinh	Male	
Cao Đức Phát	Member	Nonmember	1956	—	Nam Định	Graduate	Kinh	Male	
Hồ Đức Phớc	Nonmember	Member	1963	1993	Nghệ An	Graduate	Kinh	Male	
Đoàn Hồng Phong	Nonmember	Member	1963	1993	Nam Định	Graduate	Kinh	Male	
Nguyễn Thành Phong	Member	Member	1962	1988	Bến Tre	Graduate	Kinh	Male	
Tòng Thị Phóng	Member	Nonmember	1954	1981	Sơn La	Graduate	Thái	Female	
Nguyễn Hạnh Phúc	Member	Nonmember	1959	1986	Thái Bình	Undergraduate	Kinh	Male	
Nguyễn Xuân Phúc	Member	Member	1954	1982	Quảng Nam	Undergraduate	Kinh	Male	
Võ Văn Phuông	Member	Nonmember	1960	—	Tây Ninh	Graduate	Kinh	Male	
Trần Quang Phương	Nonmember	Member	1961	—	Quảng Ngãi	Undergraduate	Kinh	Male	
Hoàng Bình Quân	Member	Nonmember	1959	1984	Thái Bình	Undergraduate	Kinh	Male	
Hoàng Đăng Quang	Nonmember	Member	1961	1992	Quảng Bình	Graduate	Kinh	Male	
Lê Hồng Quang	Nonmember	Member	1968	1997	Kiên Giang	Graduate	Kinh	Male	
Lê Thanh Quang	Member	Nonmember	1960	—	Khánh Hòa	Undergraduate	Kinh	Male	
Trần Đại Quang	Member	Nonmember	1956	1980	Ninh Bình	Graduate	Kinh	Male	
Trần Lưu Quang	Alternate	Member	1967	1997	Tây Ninh	Undergraduate	Kinh	Male	
Phạm Văn Rạnh	Nonmember	Nonmember	1960	—	Long An	Graduate	Kinh	Male	
Trần Văn Rón	Nonmember	Member	1961	1981	Vĩnh Long	Undergraduate	Kinh	Male	
Vũ Hải Sản	Nonmember	Member	1961	1983	Nam Định	Undergraduate	Kinh	Male	
Phan Văn Sáu	Member	Nonmember	1956	1986	Đồng Tháp	Undergraduate	Kinh	Male	
Bùi Thanh Sơn	Nonmember	Member	1962	1986	Hà Nội	Graduate	Kinh	Male	
Lê Đình Sơn	Nonmember	Nonmember	1960	1988	Hà Tĩnh	Graduate	Kinh	Male	
Nguyễn Thanh Sơn	Member	Nonmember	1960	—	Kiên Giang	Graduate	Kinh	Male	
Trần Văn Sơn	Nonmember	Member	1961	1995	Nam Định	Graduate	Kinh	Male	
Thào Xuân Sùng	Member	Nonmember	1958	1984	Sơn La	Undergraduate	Hmong	Male	
Đỗ Tiến Sỹ	Nonmember	Member	1965	1993	Hưng Yên	Undergraduate	Kinh	Male	
Lê Vĩnh Tân	Member	Nonmember	1958	1980	Đồng Tháp	Undergraduate	Kinh	Male	
Đinh La Thăng	Nonmember	Expelled	1960	1985	Nam Định	Graduate	Kinh	Male	
Huỳnh Chiến Thắng	Nonmember	Member	1965	—	Bến Tre	Undergraduate	Kinh	Male	
Nguyễn Xuân Thắng	Member	Member	1957	1983	Nghệ An	Graduate	Kinh	Male	
Sơn Minh Thắng	Member	Nonmember	1960	—	Trà Vinh	—	Khmer	Male	
Lâm Thị Phương Thanh	Nonmember	Member	1967	1989	Ninh Bình	Graduate	Kinh	Female	
Nguyễn Đức Thanh	Nonmember	Member	1962	1989	Hà Tĩnh	Undergraduate	Kinh	Male	
Nguyễn Thị Thanh	Alternate	Member	1967	1988	Ninh Bình	Graduate	Kinh	Female	
Phạm Viết Thanh	Nonmember	Member	1962	1982	Quảng Nam	Graduate	Kinh	Male	
Trần Sỹ Thanh	Alternate	Member	1971	1995	Nghệ An	Graduate	Kinh	Male	
Vũ Hồng Thanh	Nonmember	Member	1962	1998	Hải Dương	Graduate	Kinh	Male	
Lê Văn Thành	Nonmember	Member	1962	1997	Hải Phòng	Graduate	Kinh	Male	
Nguyễn Văn Thành	Member	Nonmember	1957	1982	Ninh Bình	Graduate	Kinh	Male	
Nguyễn Văn Thể	Alternate	Member	1966	1993	Đồng Tháp	Graduate	Kinh	Male	
Nguyễn Ngọc Thiện	Member	Nonmember	1959	1985	Thừa Thiên Huế	Graduate	Kinh	Male	
Đặng Thị Ngọc Thịnh	Member	Nonmember	1959	1979	Quảng Nam	Graduate	Kinh	Female	
Võ Văn Thưởng	Member	Member	1970	1993	Vĩnh Long	Graduate	Kinh	Male	
Lê Thị Thủy	Nonmember	Member	1964	1993	Nghệ An	Graduate	Kinh	Female	
Nguyễn Xuân Tiến	Member	Nonmember	1958	—	Thừa Thiên Huế	Undergraduate	Kinh	Male	
Bùi Văn Tỉnh	Member	Nonmember	1958	1988	Hòa Bình	Undergraduate	Kinh	Male	
Trần Quốc Tỏ	Nonmember	Member	1962	1987	Ninh Bình	Graduate	Kinh	Male	
Phạm Thị Thanh Trà	Nonmember	Member	1962	1993	Nghệ An	Graduate	Kinh	Female	
Phan Đình Trạc	Member	Member	1958	1980	Nghệ An	Undergraduate	Kinh	Male	
Dương Văn Trang	Nonmember	Member	1961	1982	Quảng Ngãi	Undergraduate	Kinh	Male	
Lê Minh Trí	Nonmember	Member	1960	1984	Hồ Chí Minh	Undergraduate	Kinh	Male	
Nguyễn Phú Trọng	Member	Member	1944	1968	Hà Nội	Graduate	Kinh	Male	
Mai Trực	Member	Nonmember	1957	1979	Khánh Hòa	Undergraduate	Kinh	Male	
Đào Việt Trung	Member	Nonmember	1959	1983	Hà Nam	Undergraduate	Kinh	Male	
Lê Hoài Trung	Nonmember	Member	1961	1986	Thừa Thiên Huế	Graduate	Kinh	Male	
Trần Quốc Trung	Nonmember	Nonmember	1960	1989	Hậu Giang	Undergraduate	Kinh	Male	
Bế Xuân Trường	Member	Nonmember	1957	1979	Cao Bằng	—	Kinh	Male	
Trần Cẩm Tú	Member	Member	1961	1990	Hà Tĩnh	Graduate	Kinh	Male	
Trương Minh Tuấn	Nonmember	Expelled	1960	1980	Lâm Đồng	Graduate	Kinh	Male	
Nguyễn Thanh Tùng	Nonmember	Nonmember	1960	1986	Bình Định	Graduate	Kinh	Male	
Trần Văn Túy	Member	Nonmember	1957	1983	Bắc Ninh	Graduate	Kinh	Male	
Đỗ Bá Tỵ	Member	Nonmember	1954	1974	Hà Nội	—	Kinh	Male	
Huỳnh Tấn Việt	Nonmember	Member	1962	1986	Phú Yên	Graduate	Kinh	Male	
Võ Trọng Việt	Member	Nonmember	1957	1977	Hà Tĩnh	—	Kinh	Male	
Nguyễn Đắc Vinh	Alternate	Member	1972	2003	Nghệ An	Graduate	Kinh	Male	
Triệu Tài Vinh	Member	Nonmember	1968	1998	Hà Giang	Graduate	Dao	Male	
Lê Huy Vịnh	Nonmember	Member	1961	—	Hà Nội	Graduate	Kinh	Male	
Nguyễn Chí Vịnh	Member	Nonmember	1957	—	Thừa Thiên Huế	Graduate	Kinh	Male	
Nguyễn Văn Vịnh	Nonmember	Nonmember	1960	1992	Yên Bái	Undergraduate	Kinh	Male	
Lê Quý Vương	Member	Nonmember	1956	1981	Phú Thọ	Graduate	Kinh	Male	
Trần Quốc Vượng	Member	Nonmember	1953	1979	Thái Bình	Graduate	Kinh	Male	
Võ Thị Ánh Xuân	Alternate	Member	1970	1994	An Giang	Undergraduate	Kinh	Female	

== Bibliography ==
- Hung, Nguyen Manh (2016). "Continuity and Change under Vietnam's New Leadership" (PDF). Perspective. ISEAS–Yusof Ishak Institute: 1–7. Archived from the original (PDF) on 23 July 2024.
- Nguyen, Phuong (2017). "Vietnam in 2016: Searching for a New Ethos". Southeast Asian Affairs. ISEAS–Yusof Ishak Institute: 421–435. JSTOR 26492622.
- Vuving, Alexander L. (2017). "The 2016 Leadership Change in Vietnam and Its Long-Term Implications". Southeast Asian Affairs. ISEAS–Yusof Ishak Institute: 407–420. JSTOR 26492621.
