= 12th Politburo of the Communist Party of Vietnam =

Politburo of Vietnam's Communist Party

12th Politburo
- Symbol of the Communist Party of Vietnam

27 January 2016 – 25 January 2021 (4 years, 364 days) Overview
- Type: Political organ
- Election: 1st Plenary Session of the 12th Central Committee

Members
- Total: 19 members
- Newcomers: 12 members (12th)
- Old: 7 members (11th)
- Reelected: 8 members (13th)

Documents
- No. of announcements: 6 approved
- No. of conclusions: 18 approved
- No. of decisions: 8 approved
- No. of instructions: 5 approved
- No. of regulations: 15 approved
- No. of resolutions: 11 approved
- No. of other documents: 1 approved

The 12th Politburo, formally the Political Bureau of the 12th Central Committee of the Communist Party of Vietnam (CPV, Vietnamese: Bộ Chính trị Ban Chấp hành trung ương Đảng Cộng sản Việt Nam Khoá XII), was elected at the 1st Plenary Session of the 12th Central Committee (CC) on 27 January 2016 during the 12th National Congress to serve for a five-year electoral term. The Politburo is a central leading organ of the CPV Central Committee tasked with directing the general orientation of the party and state. In this sense, it functions as the highest political organ of the CPV when the Party's National Congress and the Central Committee are adjourned. Since Vietnam is a communist state that bases its governance system on the principle that "the Party leads and the State manages", the Politburo also function as the highest decision-making institution in Vietnam. The Politburo convenes meetings several times a month to discuss and decide policy, and the Secretariat, another central leading organ, ensures that said policies are executed by the relevant institution in question, such as the National Assembly of Vietnam if the policy concerns law-making, or the Party's Central Organisation Commission if it concerns cadre policy. The total number of meetings the 12th Politburo convened has not been publicly disclosed to the media. Some have been publicly reported, however, and are listed below (see "Convocations" section).

The 12th National Congress adopted a resolution that stated the CPV needed to establish a streamlined, efficient political system and combat corruption, waste, and bureaucracy. Shortly after his re-election to the Politburo and as General Secretary of the Central Committee on 27 January 2016, Nguyễn Phú Trọng ramped up his anti-corruption campaign. Đinh La Thăng was removed from the Politburo in May 2017 by the 12th CC's 5th Plenary Session when the 12th Central Inspection Commission started investigating him for mismanaging the state-owned enterprise PetroVietnam, resulting in a loss of 900 billion Vietnamese dongs (around 40 million United States dollars); he was arrested in December 2017 and sentenced to thirteen years in prison in January 2018. In tandem with the anti-corruption drive, Prime Minister Nguyễn Xuân Phúc began to streamline the government by cutting the number of deputy prime ministers from five to four and ministries from 26 to 22. Institutionally, the campaign was strengthened by appointing six members of the 12th Politburo to serve in the Central Steering Committee on Anti-corruption, providing the Central Inspection Commission with the ability to audit and supervise personnel property declarations under the Politburo and Secretariat's management, and seven central inspection teams were established to investigate serious corruption cases that drew public attention. This campaign developed alongside a campaign to strengthen party morality and Marxist–Leninist ideology and to combat perceived ideological evils such as liberal democratic values, self-evolution and self-transformation.

Unlike in the 11th Politburo when Nguyễn Phú Trọng was involved in a power struggle against Nguyễn Tấn Dũng, then Prime Minister, the 12th Politburo was hallmarked by his dominance over decision-making. Considering his age (above the age limit of 65) and the CPV's Charter that limits general secretaries to serve a maximum of two five-year terms, commentators such as Hai Hong Nguyen believed Nguyễn Phú Trọng would leave the office at the 13th National Congress in 2021. Of the 17 members of the 12th Politburo, only Trọng and Đinh Thế Huynh did not meet the criteria to be General Secretary for the 13th Central Committee. The 13th National Congress granted Nguyễn Phú Trọng an exception from the age and term limit, however, allowing him to serve a third term, leading political scientist Hung Nguyen to conclude: "The fact that Trọng was given special consideration twice — in 2016 for age exception and in 2021 for term limit — proves that he is the most powerful person in the country and, at the present time, irreplaceable."

The number of Politburo members increased from 16 during the 11th term to 19. Of these, three members were women (Nguyễn Thị Kim Ngân, Tòng Thị Phóng and Trương Thị Mai), the highest proportion of women serving in a given Politburo term in the CPV's history. Of the 19 members, 15 were members of the 14th National Assembly of Vietnam. A record-setting four members served as government ministers. Moreover, according to scholar Nguyen Manh Hung, "More important is the dominance by people with a public security background in the new leadership, perhaps in response to the need for political stability as well as the need to manage human rights issues when dealing with Western countries." Additionally, several Politburo members experienced health problems during their term. Đinh Thế Huynh was on sick leave from June 2017 and was relieved of his formal duties in March 2018. Trần Đại Quang, the President of Vietnam, having started to experience health issues in June 2017, died on 21 September 2018 at the age of 61. Thirteen days later, on 30 September, the Politburo voted to nominate Nguyễn Phú Trọng for state president. Shortly after his election to the presidency, rumours started to surface that Nguyễn Phú Trọng was also suffering from health problems, and on 14 April 2019, he purportedly suffered a stroke when visiting Kiên Giang province, though it was not officially confirmed. Nguyễn Phú Trọng recovered, and in 2020, under his leadership, the 12th term disciplined Politburo members Nguyễn Văn Bình and Hoàng Trung Hải for defaming the party. The two retained their Politburo membership but could not seek reelection at the 13th National Congress. Of the remaining fourteen members who had not been arrested, died, disciplined or taken health leave, eight were reelected to the 13th Politburo (Nguyễn Phú Trọng, Tô Lâm, Nguyễn Xuân Phúc, Phạm Minh Chính, Vương Đình Huệ, Phạm Bình Minh, Trương Thị Mai and Võ Văn Thưởng).

== Convocations ==
Disclosed convocations of the 12th Politburo
Date	Length	Type	Ref.
15 September 2016	1 day	Working	
28 July 2017	1 day	Meeting	
7 October 2017	1 day	Conference	
19 October 2017	1 day	Working	
2 March 2018	1 day	Meeting	
11–12 April 2018	2 days	Meeting	
12 July 2018	1 day	Meeting	
28 July 2018	1 day	Meeting	
18–19 September 2018	2 days	Meeting	
13 December 2018	1 day	Working	
21 March 2019	1 day	Meeting	
15 May 2019	1 day	Meeting	
17 May 2019	1 day	Meeting	
21 June 2019	1 day	Meeting	
5 July 2019	1 day	Meeting	
19 July 2019	1 day	Meeting	
27 September 2019	1 day	Conference	
1 November 2019	1 day	Meeting	
15 November 2019	1 day	Meeting	
26 December 2019	1 day	Meeting	
10 January 2020	1 day	Meeting	
2 February 2020	1 day	Enlarged	
14 February 2020	1 day	Meeting	
20 March 2020	1 day	Meeting	
16 June 2020	1 day	Meeting	
11 August 2020	1 day	Meeting	
12 September 2020	1 day	Working	
21 September 2020	1 day	Working	
11 October 2020	1 day	Meeting	
6 November 2020	1 day	Meeting	
8 December 2020	1 day	Meeting	

== Documents ==
Documents of the 12th Politburo of the Communist Party of Vietnam
Case number	Type	Title	Date of issue & Enforcement	Ref.
01-CT/TW	Instruction	"Về học tập, quán triệt, tuyên truyền, triển khai thực hiện Nghị quyết Đại hội đại biểu toàn quốc lần thứ XII của Đảng" "On learning, thoroughly observing, propagating and implementing the resolutions of the Party's 12th National Congress"	22 March 2016	Ref.
01-KL/TW	Conclusion	"Về việc tiếp tục thực hiện Nghị quyết số 48-NQ/TW của Bộ Chính trị khóa IX về Chiến lược xây dựng và hoàn thiện hệ thống pháp luật Việt Nam đến năm 2010, định hướng đến năm 2020" "On the continuation of the implementation of Resolution No. 48-NQ/TW of the IX Politburo on the Strategy for building and perfecting the Vietnamese legal system by 2010, orientation to 2020"	4 April 2016	
05-CT/TW	Instruction	"Về đẩy mạnh học tập và làm theo tư tưởng, đạo đức, phong cách Hồ Chí Minh" "On promoting studying and following of Hồ Chí Minh's thought, morality and style"	15 May 2016	
04-KH/TW	Other	"Thực hiện Nghị quyết Hội nghị lần thứ tư Ban Chấp hành Trung ương khóa XII về tăng cường xây dựng, chỉnh đốn Đảng; ngăn chặn, đẩy lùi sự suy thoái về tư tưởng chính trị, đạo đức, lối sống, những biểu hiện “tự diễn biến”, “tự chuyển hóa” trong nội bộ" "To implement the Resolution of the Fourth Plenary Session of the 12th Central Committee of the Communist Party of Vietnam on strengthening the building and rectification of the Party; prevent and reverse the deterioration of political ideology, morality, lifestyle, and internal "self-evolution" and "self-transformation" manifestations"	16 November 2016	
07-NQ/TW	Resolution	"Về chủ trương, giải pháp cơ cấu lại ngân sách nhà nước, quản lý nợ công để bảo đảm nền tài chính quốc gia an toàn, bền vững" "On policies and solutions to restructure the state budget, manage public debt to ensure a safe and sustainable national finance"	18 November 2016	
55-QĐ/TW	Regulation	"Về một số việc cần làm ngay để tăng cường vai trò nêu gương của cán bộ, đảng viên" "On some things that need to be done immediately to strengthen the role of example for cadres and party members"	19 December 2016	
60-QĐ/TW	Decision	"Về chức năng, nhiệm vụ, quyền hạn, tổ chức bộ máy của Cơ quan Ủy ban Kiểm tra Trung ương" "On the functions, tasks, powers and organisational structure of the Central Inspection Commission"	26 December 2016	
08-NQ/TW	Resolution	"Về phát triển du lịch trở thành ngành kinh tế mũi nhọn" "On developing tourism to become a spearhead economic sector"	16 January 2017	
36-TB/TW	Announcement	"Về công tác luân chuyển cán bộ" "On cadre rotation"	19 July 2017	
89-QĐ/TW	Regulation	"Về khung tiêu chuẩn chức danh, định hướng khung tiêu chí đánh giá cán bộ lãnh đạo, quản lý các cấp" "On the title standard framework, orienting the framework of evaluation criteria for leaders and managers at all levels"	4 August 2017	
90-QĐ/TW	Regulation	"Về tiêu chuẩn chức danh, tiêu chí đánh giá cán bộ thuộc diện Ban Chấp hành Trung ương, Bộ Chính trị, Ban Bí thư quản lý" "On title standards and evaluation criteria for cadres under the management of the Central Committee, the Politburo, and the Secretariat"	4 August 2017	
98-QĐ/TW	Regulation	"Về luân chuyển cán bộ" "On cadre rotation"	7 October 2017	
21-KL/TW	Conclusion	"Về sơ kết 5 năm thực hiện Nghị quyết số 16-NQ/TW của Bộ Chính trị về phương hướng, nhiệm vụ phát triển Thành phố Hồ Chí Minh đến năm 2020" "On the 5-year summary of the implementation of the Politburo's Resolution No. 16-NQ/TW on the directions and tasks for the development of Hồ Chí Minh City to 2020"	24 October 2017	
22-KL/TW	Conclusion	"Về sơ kết 5 năm thực hiện Nghị quyết số 11-NQ/TW của Bộ Chính trị về phương hướng, nhiệm vụ phát triển Thủ đô Hà Nội giai đoạn 2011 - 2020" "On the preliminary review of the 5-years of implementation of the Politburo's Resolution No. 11-NQ/TW on the directions and tasks for the development of Hà Nội Capital City in the 2011 - 2020 period"	7 November 2017	
102-QĐ/TW	Regulation	"Quy định về xử lý kỷ luật đảng viên vi phạm" "Regulations on disciplining party members who violate party discipline"	15 November 2017	
24/KL-TW	Conclusion	"Về nguyên tắc điều động, phân công, bố trí công tác đối với cán bộ Trung ương luân chuyển" "On the principle of dispatching, assigning and arranging work for the rotation of central-level cadres"	15 November 2017	
105-QĐ/TW	Regulation	"Về phân cấp quản lý cán bộ và bổ nhiệm, giới thiệu cán bộ ứng cử" "On the decentralisation of cadre management and appointment and introduction of candidates"	19 December 2017	
29-KL/TW	Conclusion	"Về tổng kết 10 năm thực hiện Quy định số 15-QĐ/TW của Ban Chấp hành Trung ương Đảng khóa X về đảng viên làm kinh tế tư nhân" "On summarising the 10 years of implementation of Regulation No. 15-QD/TW of the X Party Central Committee on Party members working in the private economy"	31 January 2018	
132-QĐ/TW	Regulation	"Về việc kiểm điểm và đánh giá, xếp loại chất lượng hằng năm đối với tập thể, cá nhân trong hệ thống chính trị" "On the annual review, evaluation, and quality rating for collectives and individuals in the political system"	8 March 2018	
23-NQ/TW	Resolution	"Định hướng xây dựng chính sách phát triển công nghiệp quốc gia đến năm 2030, tầm nhìn đến năm 2045" "Orientation on developing the national industrial development policy to 2030, vision to 2045"	22 March 2018	
01-QĐi/TW	Regulation	"Về trách nhiệm và thẩm quyền của Ủy ban Kiểm tra trong công tác phòng, chống tham nhũng" "On the responsibilities and authority of the Inspection Committee in anti-corruption work"	10 May 2018	
34-KL/TW	Conclusion	"Về thực hiện một số mô hình thí điểm theo Nghị quyết số 18-NQ/TW, ngày 25/10/2017 của Ban Chấp hành Trung ương khóa XII Một số vấn đề về tiếp tục đổi mới, sắp xếp tổ chức bộ máy của hệ thống chính trị tinh gọn, hoạt động hiệu lực, hiệu quả" "On the implementation of a number of pilot projects according to Resolution No. 18-NQ/TW, dated 25/10/2017 of the XII Central Executive Committee Some issues on continuing renovation and organisational arrangement of the lean political system, effective and efficient operation"	7 August 2018	
144-QĐ/TW	Decision	"Quy định về chức năng, nhiệm vụ, quyền hạn, tổ chức bộ máy của Ban Tuyên giáo Trung ương" "Regulations on functions, tasks, powers and organisational structure of the Central Committee for Propaganda and Education"	8 August 2018	
38-KL/TW	Conclusion	"Về tổng kết 10 năm thực hiện Nghị quyết số 22-NQ/TW của Ban Chấp hành Trung ương khóa X về nâng cao năng lực lãnh đạo, sức chiến đấu của tổ chức cơ sở đảng và chất lượng đội ngũ cán bộ, đảng viên" "On summarising 10 years of implementation of Resolution No. 22-NQ/TW of the X Central Committee on improving leadership capacity, combat strength of grassroots party organisations and quality of cadres and party members"	31 November 2018	
10-QĐi/TW	Regulation	"Quy định chức năng, nhiệm vụ, quyền hạn và mối quan hệ công tác của cấp ủy, ban thường vụ cấp ủy tỉnh, thành phố trực thuộc Trung ương" "Regulations on functions, tasks, powers and working relationships of committees and standing committees of provinces and centrally run cities"	12 December 2018	
166-QĐ/TW	Decision	"Về chức năng, nhiệm vụ, quyền hạn, tổ chức bộ máy của Ban Kinh tế Trung ương" "On the functions, tasks, powers and organisational structure of the Central Economic Commission"	18 December 2018	
37-NQ/TW	Resolution	"Về việc sắp xếp các đơn vị hành chính cấp huyện và cấp xã" "On the arrangement of administrative units at district and commune levels"	24 December 2018	
27-CT/TW	Instruction	"Về tăng cường sự lãnh đạo của Đảng đối với công tác bảo vệ người phát hiện, tố giác, người đấu tranh chống tham nhũng, lãng phí, tiêu cực" "On strengthening the Party's leadership over the protection of discoverers, whistleblowers, and those who fight against corruption, waste and negativity"	10 January 2019	
39-NQ/TW	Resolution	"Về nâng cao hiệu quả quản lý, khai thác, sử dụng và phát huy các nguồn lực của nền kinh tế" "On improving the efficiency of management, exploitation, use and promotion of the economy's resources"	15 January 2019	
171-QĐ/TW	Decision	"Về chức năng, nhiệm vụ, tổ chức bộ máy của Văn phòng Trung ương Đảng" "On the functions, tasks and organisational apparatus of the Party Central Committee's Office"	16 January 2019	
43-NQ/TW	Resolution	"Về xây dựng và phát triển thành phố Đà Nẵng đến năm 2030, tầm nhìn đến năm 2045" "On construction and development of Đà Nẵng City to 2030, with a vision to 2045"	24 January 2019	
45-NQ/TW	Resolution	"Về xây dựng và phát triển thành phố Hải Phòng đến năm 2030, tầm nhìn đến năm 2045" "On the construction and development of Hải Phòng City to 2030, with a vision to 2045"	24 January 2019	
11-QĐi/TW	Regulation	"Về trách nhiệm của người đứng đầu cấp ủy trong việc tiếp dân, đối thoại trực tiếp với dân và xử lý những phản ánh, kiến nghị của dân" "On the responsibilities of the head of the Party Committee in receiving the people, having direct dialogues with the people and handling the complaints and recommendations of the people."	18 February 2019	
179-QĐ/TW	Regulation	"Về chế độ kiểm tra, giám sát công tác cán bộ" "On the mode of inspection and supervision of staff work"	25 February 2019	
46-KL/TW	Conclusion	"Về Đề án thí điểm quản lý theo mô hình chính quyền đô thị tại thành phố Hà Nội" "About the pilot project of management according to the urban government model in Hà Nội city"	19 April 2019	
55-TB/TW	Announcement	"Về sơ kết 5 năm thực hiện Nghị quyết số 26-NQ/TW của Bộ Chính trị khóa XI về phương hướng, nhiệm vụ phát triển tỉnh Nghệ An đến năm 2020" "On the preliminary review of 5 years of implementation of Resolution No. 26-NQ/TW of the XI Politburo on the direction and tasks of Nghệ An province development to 2020"	20 April 2019	
199-QĐ/TW	Decision	"Về chức năng, nhiệm vụ, tổ chức bộ máy của Tạp chí Cộng sản" "On the functions, tasks and organisation of the Communist Review's apparatus"	31 July 2019	
201-QĐ/TW	Decision	"Về việc kiện toàn Hội đồng công tác quần chúng Trung ương nhiệm kỳ 2016 - 2021" "On consolidating the Central Mass Work Mobilisation Commission for the 2016 - 2021 term"	1 August 2019	
54-KL/TW	Conclusion	"Về tiếp tục thực hiện Nghị quyết Trung ương 7 khóa X về nông nghiệp, nông dân, nông thôn" "On continuing to implement the Resolution of the 7th Plenary Session of the X Central Committee on agriculture, farmers and rural areas"	7 August 2019	
36-CT/TW	Instruction	"Về tăng cường, nâng cao hiệu quả công tác phòng, chống và kiểm soát ma túy" "On strengthening and improving the effectiveness of drug prevention, control and control"	16 August 2019	
50-NQ/TW	Resolution	"Về định hướng hoàn thiện thể chế, chính sách, nâng cao chất lượng, hiệu quả hợp tác đầu tư nước ngoài đến năm 2030" "On orientations to perfect institutions and policies, and improve the quality and efficiency of foreign investment cooperation by 2030"	20 August 2019	
56-KL/TW	Conclusion	"Về tiếp tục thực hiện Nghị quyết Trung ương 7 khóa XI về chủ động ứng phó với biến đổi khí hậu, tăng cường quản lý tài nguyên và bảo vệ môi trường" "On continuing to implement the Resolution of the 7th Plenary Session of the XI Party Central Committee on proactively responding to climate change, strengthening natural resource management and environmental protection"	23 August 2019	
205-QĐ/TW	Regulation	"Về việc kiểm soát quyền lực trong công tác cán bộ và chống chạy chức, chạy quyền" "On the regulating of power in cadre work and against running for office, running for power"	23 September 2019	
52-NQ/TW	Resolution	"Về một số chủ trương, chính sách chủ động tham gia cuộc Cách mạng công nghiệp lần thứ tư" "On a number of undertakings and policies to actively participate in the Fourth Industrial Revolution"	27 September 2019	
156-TB/TW	Announcement	"Về tiếp tục thực hiện Nghị quyết Hội nghị lần thứ năm Ban Chấp hành Trung ương khóa X “về tăng cường công tác kiểm tra, giám sát của Đảng”" "On continuing to implement the Resolution of the Fifth Plenary Session of the X Central Committee on strengthening the inspection and supervision of the Party"	1 October 2019	
60-KL/TW	Conclusion	"Về về độ tuổi tái cử chính quyền và trình độ chuyên môn, lý luận chính trị đối với nhân sự tham gia cấp ủy các cấp nhiệm kỳ 2020 - 2025" "On the age of government re-election and professional qualifications, political theory for personnel participating in party committees at all levels for the 2020 - 2025 term"	8 October 2019	
65-KL/TW	Conclusion	"Về tiếp tục thực hiện Nghị quyết số 24-NQ/TW của Ban Chấp hành Trung ương Đảng khóa IX về công tác dân tộc trong tình hình mới" "On continuing to implement Resolution No. 24-NQ/TW of the IX Party Central Committee on ethnic work in the new situation"	30 October 2019	
209-QĐ/TW	Decision	"Về việc hợp nhất Đảng bộ Ngoài nước với Đảng bộ Bộ Ngoại giao" "On the merger of the Foreign Affairs Party Committee with the Party Committee of the Ministry of Foreign Affairs"	26 November 2019	
67-KL/TW	Conclusion	"Về xây dựng và phát triển thành phố Buôn Ma Thuột, tỉnh Đắk Lắk đến năm 2030, tầm nhìn đến năm 2045" "On the construction and development of Buôn Ma Thuột City, Đắk Lắk province by 2030, with a vision to 2045"	16 December 2019	
211-QĐ/TW	Regulation	"Về chức năng, nhiệm vụ, quyền hạn, chế độ làm việc, quan hệ công tác của Ban Chỉ đạo Trung ương về phòng, chống tham nhũng" "On the functions, tasks, powers, working regime and working relationship of the Central Steering Committee on Anti-corruption"	25 December 2019	
213-QĐ/TW	Regulation	"Về trách nhiệm của đảng viên đang công tác thường xuyên giữ mối liên hệ với tổ chức đảng và nhân dân nơi cư trú" "On the responsibilities of working party members who regularly keep in touch with the party organisations and the people in their place of residence"	2 January 2020	
214-QĐ/TW	Regulation	"Về khung tiêu chuẩn chức danh, tiêu chí đánh giá cán bộ thuộc diện Ban Chấp hành Trung ương, Bộ Chính trị, Ban Bí thư quản lý" "On the title standard framework, criteria for evaluating cadres under the management of the Central Committee, the Politburo, and the Secretariat"	2 January 2020	
216-QĐ/TW	Decision	"Về chức năng, nhiệm vụ, quyền hạn, tổ chức bộ máy của Ban Nội chính Trung ương" "On the functions, tasks, powers and organisational structure of the Central Committee for Internal Affairs"	2 January 2020	
159-TB/TW	Announcement	"Về việc thảo luận các văn kiện Đại hội XIII của Đảng tại đại hội đảng bộ các cấp, gửi lấy ý kiến nhân dân và tổng hợp các ý kiến đóng góp vào các văn kiện Đại hội XIII của Đảng" "On the discussion of documents of the 13th Party Congress at party congresses at all levels, sending comments to the people and synthesising comments on documents of the 13th Party Congress"	15 January 2020	
160-TB/TW	Announcement	"Về việc tiếp tục thực hiện Kết luận số 62-KL/TW, ngày 08/12/2009 của Bộ Chính trị" "On continuing to implement Conclusion No. 62-KL/TW, dated 08/12/2009 of the Politburo"	15 January 2020	
55-NQ/TW	Resolution	"Về định hướng Chiến lược phát triển năng lượng quốc gia của Việt Nam đến năm 2030, tầm nhìn đến năm 2045" "On the orientation of Vietnam's national energy development strategy to 2030, with a vision to 2045"	11 February 2020	
70-KL/TW	Conclusion	"Về tiếp tục thực hiện Nghị quyết Trung ương 5 khóa IX về tiếp tục đổi mới, phát triển và nâng cao hiệu quả kinh tế tập thể" "On continuing to implement the Resolution of the 5th Plenary Session of the IX Central Committee on continuing to innovate, develop and improve the efficiency of the collective economy"	9 March 2020	
172-TB/TW	Announcement	"Về công tác phòng, chống dịch bệnh COVID-19" "On the prevention and control of the COVID-19 epidemic"	21 March 2020	
76/KL/TW	Conclusion	"Về tiếp tục thực hiện Nghị quyết số 33-NQ/TW của Ban Chấp hành Trung ương Đảng khoá XI về xây dựng và phát triển văn hoá, con người Việt Nam đáp ứng yêu cầu phát triển bền vững đất nước" "On continuing to implement Resolution No. 33-NQ/TW of the XI Party Central Committee on building and developing Vietnamese culture and people to meet the requirements of sustainable development of the country"	4 June 2020	
77-KL/TW	Conclusion	"Về chủ trương khắc phục tác động của đại dịch COVID-19 để phục hồi và phát triển nền kinh tế đất nước" "On the policy of overcoming the impact of the COVID-19 pandemic to recover and develop the country's economy"	5 June 2020	
45-CT/TW	Instruction	"Về lãnh đạo cuộc bầu cử đại biểu Quốc hội khoá XV và bầu cử đại biểu Hội đồng nhân dân các cấp nhiệm kỳ 2021 - 2026" "On leadership in the election of deputies to the XV National Assembly and the election of deputies to the People's Councils at all levels for the 2021 - 2026 term"	20 June 2020	
81-KL/TW	Conclusion	"Về bảo đảm an ninh lương thực quốc gia đến năm 2030" "On ensuring national food security until 2030"	29 July 2020	
59-NQ/TW	Resolution	"Về xây dựng và phát triển thành phố Cần Thơ đến năm 2030, tầm nhìn đến năm 2045" "On the construction and development of Cần Thơ City to 2030, vision to 2045"	5 August 2020	
92-KL/TW	Conclusion	"Về tiếp tục thực hiện Nghị quyết Hội nghị Trung ương 5 khóa XI một số vấn đề về chính sách xã hội giai đoạn 2012 - 2020" "On continuing to implement the Resolution of the 5th Plenary Session of the XI Central Committee on some issues on social policy for the period 2012 - 2020"	5 November 2020	

== Members ==
Members of the 12th Politburo of the Communist Party of Vietnam
R.	Name	11th	13th	Birth	PM	Birthplace	Education	Ethnicity	Gender	Ref.
1	Nguyễn Phú Trọng	Member	Member	1944	1968	Hà Nội	Graduate	Kinh	Male	
2	Trần Đại Quang	Member	Died	1956	1980	Ninh Bình	Graduate	Kinh	Male	
3	Nguyễn Thị Kim Ngân	Member	Nonmember	1954	1981	Bến Tre	Graduate	Kinh	Female	
4	Ngô Xuân Lịch	Nonmember	Nonmember	1954	1973	Hà Nam	Graduate	Kinh	Male	
5	Tô Lâm	Nonmember	Member	1956	1981	Hưng Yên	Graduate	Kinh	Male	
6	Nguyễn Xuân Phúc	Member	Member	1954	1982	Quảng Nam	Undergraduate	Kinh	Male	
7	Nguyễn Thiện Nhân	Member	Nonmember	1953	1980	Trà Vinh	Graduate	Kinh	Male	
8	Đinh Thế Huynh	Member	Nonmember	1953	1974	Nam Định	Graduate	Kinh	Male	
9	Phạm Minh Chính	Nonmember	Member	1958	1986	Thanh Hoá	Graduate	Kinh	Male	
10	Tòng Thị Phóng	Member	Nonmember	1954	1981	Sơn La	Graduate	Thái	Female	
11	Vương Đình Huệ	Nonmember	Member	1957	1984	Nghệ An	Graduate	Kinh	Male	
12	Trần Quốc Vượng	Nonmember	Nonmember	1953	1979	Thái Bình	Graduate	Kinh	Male	
13	Phạm Bình Minh	Nonmember	Member	1959	1984	Nam Định	Graduate	Kinh	Male	
14	Trương Thị Mai	Nonmember	Member	1958	1985	Quảng Bình	Graduate	Kinh	Female	
15	Trương Hòa Bình	Nonmember	Nonmember	1955	1973	Long An	Graduate	Kinh	Male	
16	Nguyễn Văn Bình	Nonmember	Nonmember	1961	1995	Phú Thọ	Graduate	Kinh	Male	
17	Võ Văn Thưởng	Nonmember	Member	1970	1993	Vĩnh Long	Graduate	Kinh	Male	
18	Đinh La Thăng	Nonmember	Removed	1960	1985	Nam Định	Graduate	Kinh	Male	
19	Hoàng Trung Hải	Nonmember	Nonmember	1959	1990	Thái Bình	Graduate	Kinh	Male	

== Bibliography ==
- Hung, Nguyen Manh (2016). "Continuity and Change under Vietnam's New Leadership" (PDF). Perspective. ISEAS–Yusof Ishak Institute: 1–7.
- Nguyen, Phuong (2017). "Vietnam in 2016: Searching for a New Ethos". Southeast Asian Affairs. ISEAS–Yusof Ishak Institute: 421–435. JSTOR 26492622.
- Schuler, Paul; Truong, Mai (2020). "Vietnam in 2019: A Return to Familiar Patterns". Southeast Asian Affairs. ISEAS–Yusof Ishak Institute: 393–410. doi:10.1355/aa20-1u. JSTOR 26938901.
- Vuving, Alexander L. (2017). "The 2016 Leadership Change in Vietnam and Its Long-Term Implications". Southeast Asian Affairs. ISEAS–Yusof Ishak Institute: 407–420. JSTOR 26492621.
- Vuving, Alexander L. (2019). "The Vietnam in 2018: A Rent-Seeking State on Correction Course". Southeast Asian Affairs. ISEAS–Yusof Ishak Institute: 375–394. doi:10.1355/aa19-1w. JSTOR 26939705.
