= 11th Politburo of the Communist Party of Vietnam =

Politburo of Vietnam's Communist Party

The 11th Politburo of the Communist Party of Vietnam (CPV), formally the 11th Political Bureau of the Central Committee of the Communist Party of Vietnam (Vietnamese: Bộ Chính trị Ban Chấp hành trung ương Đảng Cộng sản Việt Nam Khoá XI), was elected at the 1st Plenary Session of the 11th Central Committee in the immediate aftermath of the 11th National Congress. Of the 14 members of the 11th Politubro, five of them were new to the Politburo (Trần Đại Quang, Tòng Thị Phóng, Ngô Văn Dụ, Đinh Thế Huynh and Nguyễn Xuân Phúc). Nguyễn Phú Trọng was elected General Secretary of the Central Committee – as General Secretary he presides over the work of the Central Committee, the Secretariat and the Politburo.

The 11th Politburo, and in particular Prime Minister Nguyễn Tấn Dũng, the third ranked member, has been criticised over its handling of the Vietnamese economy. In the aftermath of the 6th plenum of the Central Committee (held 1–15 October 2012), Nguyễn Phú Trọng issued an official apology to the people of Vietnam, saying "The Politburo and Secretariat for many terms now have made some big mistakes, especially having not prevented and remedied corruption and the deterioration among some party members", further stating that "Some senior officials, those currently in office as well as former ones, have occasionally not been morally good role models through their lifestyles and those of their families. They have significantly impacted the prestige of the party and the state." He specified that the Central Committee choose not to dissolve the 14-member 11th Politburo, even if one of its members (later proven to be Nguyễn Tấn Dũng), "was deserving of punishment." Later, at a convocation of the National Assembly, Nguyễn Tấn Dũng apologised to the Vietnamese people; "I recognise my political responsibility and my faults" over his handling of the Vietnamese economy.

According to Tuong Vu, an associate professor at the University of Oregon, there exists a rivalry between Trương Tấn Sang, Nguyễn Phú Trọng, Nguyễn Sinh Hùng, the Chairman of the National Assembly, and others against Nguyễn Tấn Dũng and his supporters. According to several diplomats and Western academics, Trương Tấn Sang, during the run-up to the 11th National Congress, tried to supplant Nguyễn Tấn Dũng as prime minister. In this he failed, and he was instead appointed to the largely ceremonial post of President. One of the most outstanding critiques of Nguyễn Tấn Dũng's economic policy is his handling of the state-owned sector; state companies have preserved Soviet-like working ethics, together with large loans, and overextended growth led to a meltdown of two high-profile state-owned companies; both Vinashin and Vinalines both required government rescue. Nguyễn Tấn Dũng's has also been criticised by his handling of corruption; several corruption scandals became public during his first term as prime minister. Following the 6th plenum of the Central Committee, Nguyễn Phú Trọng said a vote of confidence would be introduced in 2013.

Two additional members were elected to the 11th Politburo at the 7th plenum of the 11th Central Committee on 11 May 2013.

== Members ==
Members of the 11th Politburo of the Communist Party of Vietnam
Rank	Name	10th POL		12th POL		Birth	PM	Birthplace	Education	Ethnicity	Gender	Ref.
Rank	Name	New	Rank	New	Rank	Birth	PM	Birthplace	Education	Ethnicity	Gender	Ref.
1	Nguyễn Phú Trọng	Old	6	Reelected	1	1944	1968	Hà Nội City	Graduate	Kinh	Male	
2	Trương Tấn Sang	Old	5	Not	—	1949	1969	Long An province	Undergraduate	Kinh	Male	
3	Phùng Quang Thanh	Old	8	Not	—	1949	1968	Hà Nội City	Graduate	Kinh	Male	
4	Nguyễn Tấn Dũng	Old	3	Not	—	1949	1967	Cà Mau province	Undergraduate	Kinh	Male	
5	Nguyễn Sinh Hùng	Old	11	Not	—	1946	1977	Nghệ An province	Graduate	Kinh	Male	
6	Lê Hồng Anh	Old	2	Not	—	1949	1968	Kiên Giang province	Undergraduate	Kinh	Male	
7	Lê Thanh Hải	Old	10	Not	—	1950	1968	Tiền Giang province	Undergraduate	Kinh	Male	
8	Tô Huy Rứa	Old	15	Not	—	1947	1967	Thanh Hóa province	Graduate	Kinh	Male	
9	Phạm Quang Nghị	Old	11	Not	—	1949	1973	Thanh Hóa province	Graduate	Kinh	Male	
10	Trần Đại Quang	New	—	Reelected	2	1956	1980	Ninh Bình province	Graduate	Kinh	Male	
11	Tòng Thị Phóng	New	—	Reelected	10	1954	1981	Sơn La province	Graduate	Thái	Female	
12	Ngô Văn Dụ	New	—	Not	—	1947	1969	Vĩnh Phúc province	Undergraduate	Kinh	Male	
13	Đinh Thế Huynh	New	—	Reelected	8	1953	1974	Nam Định province	Graduate	Kinh	Male	
14	Nguyễn Xuân Phúc	New	—	Reelected	6	1954	1982	Quảng Nam province	Undergraduate	Kinh	Male	
15	Nguyễn Thiện Nhân	By-election	—	Reelected	7	1953	1980	Trà Vinh province	Graduate	Kinh	Male	
16	Nguyễn Thị Kim Ngân	By-election	—	Reelected	3	1954	1981	Bến Tre province	Graduate	Kinh	Female	
