= 12th National Congress of the Communist Party of Vietnam =

Election of top leadership of Communist Party of Vietnam

- Flag of the Communist Party of Vietnam
- Date: 20–28 January 2016
- Location: Vietnam National Convention Center, Nam Từ Liêm District, Hanoi
- Participants: 1,510
- Outcome: The election of the 12th Central Committee

The 12th National Congress of the Communist Party of Vietnam (Vietnamese: Đại hội đại biểu toàn quốc lần thứ XII, 12th National Congress of Delegates) was the twelfth party congress of the Communist Party of Vietnam that was held at the My Dinh National Convention Centre, Hanoi. The party convened on January 18, 2016 and lasted until January 20. The Congress elected the 200-member Party Central Committee, composed of 180 official members and 20 alternate members.

The new committee then elected 19 members of the Central Politburo and the Central Committee in the First Plenary Session of the 12th Central Committee, which included four key government positions: Nguyễn Phú Trọng was re-elected as General Secretary—the head of the Politburo, Trần Đại Quang was nominated as the President of Vietnam—the head of the state and ranked second in the Politburo, Nguyễn Xuân Phúc was elected as the prime minister—the head of the government and ranked third in the Politburo, and Nguyễn Thị Kim Ngân was elected as Chairwoman of the National Assembly of Vietnam—the legislative speaker of National assembly, ranked fourth in the Politburo.

The 12th National Congress of the Communist Party of Vietnam included an assessment of the country's national leadership and development that had occurred over the past 30 years of reform. At the same time, the party evaluated the implementation of the 11th National Congress' policies from 2011 to 2015, and set new policies to be implemented over the period from 2016 to 2020. The Doi Moi economic reforms have benefited Vietnam's society, resulting in an ongoing transformation of the state. Vietnam experienced a shift regarding the basis of regime legitimacy, with a change from nationalism and socialist ideology to performance, as well as a shift towards a diversified foreign policy through strategic partnerships and economic cooperation.

== Preparations ==
=== Central Committee's nomination ===
The 12th Congress elected the Central Committee on January 26, 2016, but the committee's membership was effectively decided five weeks earlier at the 13th Plenum of the 11th Central Committee (December 14–21, 2015). Following this, the 14th Plenum, held one week before the 12th Congress, finalised the 11th Central Committee's recommendations for the top posts in the party-state. A few months later, the National Assembly formally appointed the General Secretary, President, Prime Minister and Chairman of the National Assembly for the next five years.

Before the Politburo's nominations were published, Trong was considered to have a disadvantage as he exceeded the age limit of sixty for incumbent members. However, the final declaration showed his success not only because of a power struggle between Nguyen Tan Dung and Nguyen Phu Trong, but also an equilibrium of domestic politics between different factions.

=== New leadership ===
==== General Secretary ====
Phuong Nguyen noted that "Trong's reappointment was a crucial development which set the tone for Vietnam's politics and direction in the wake of the congress," and that, after a competition with Dung, these political developments are viewed as signs that public opinion and elite factionalism will play an increasing role in Vietnam's foreign policy. This is supported by the fact that during the 2013 National Assembly confidence vote, Prime Minister Nguyen Tan Dung won the full support of just 42% of the national assembly and was given "low confidence" ratings by about a third of the house, in contrast to President Truong Tan Sang, who won 330 high-confidence votes from the 498 lawmakers and only 28 low-confidence ballots. Dung's low confidence vote was a reaction to his promotion of centralized leadership; Dung's intention of being a strong General Secretary would undermine the Central Committee, which favors a division of power at the top. Party chief Nguyen Phu Trong, who had led an "anybody but Dung" coalition, emerged to squash Dung's ambition by attacking his loyalty to the party, management track record, and fitness to lead.

Dung's aggressive politics turned many people against him. National Assembly Chair Nguyen Sinh Hung, a rent seeker, joined Trong's camp because Dung constantly expanded his control of the banking sector, which could have potentially unveiled corruption on Hung's part. This directly resulted in the imbalance between Trong's and Dung's camps, leaving Dung relatively isolated in the Politburo. Consequently, in 2015, Dung failed to gain the Politburo's support for his General Secretary candidacy.

==== Politburo ====
The Politburo is elected by the Central Committee during its first session. The Politburo members are ranked in the official order of precedence every time the body is elected.

No.	Name	Post(s)	Term start	Term end
1	Nguyen Phu Trong	General Secretary	28 January 2016	
2	Tran Dai Quang	President	28 January 2016	On September 21, 2018, Tran Dai Quang died at the 108 Hospital of Hanoi, at the age of 62 from an illness.
3	Nguyen Xuan Phuc	Prime Minister	28 January 2016	
4	Nguyen Thi Kim Ngan	Chairwoman of the National Assembly	28 January 2016	
5	To Lam	Minister of Public Security	28 January 2016	
6	Ngo Xuan Lich	Minister of National Defence and Chief of the General Department of Politics of Vietnam	28 January 2016	
7	Nguyen Thien Nhan	Secretary of Ho Chi Minh City's Central Party Committee		
8	Dinh The Huynh	Executive Secretary of Secretariat of the Central Committee		On March 2, 2018, the Politburo decided to relieve Dinh The Huynh so that he could continue to receive long-term treatment.
9	Pham Minh Chinh	Secretary of Quang Ninh Province's Party Committee		
10	Tong Thi Phong	Deputy Chairwoman of the National Assembly		
11	Vuong Dinh Hue	Deputy Prime Minister		
12	Tran Quoc Vuong	Head of the Inspection Commission of the National Assembly 12th tenure		
13	Pham Binh Minh	Minister of Foreign Affairs		
14	Truong Thi Mai	Chairwoman of National Assembly's Committee on Social Affairs		
15	Truong Hoa Binh	Chief Judge of the Supreme People's Court		
16	Nguyen Van Binh	Governor of the State Bank of Vietnam		
17	Vo Van Thuong	HCM City Permanent Deputy Party Secretary		
18	Dinh La Thang	Minister of Transport		On January 22, 2018, he was sentenced to 13 years in prison for corruption. On May 9, 2018, the Seventh Plenary Session of the 12th Central Committee dismissed him from the party.
19	Hoang Trung Hai	Deputy Prime Minister		

After the 12th National Congress, the Politburo made several adjustments, including a vote on the nomination of Nguyen Phu Trong as president on October 3, after the death of Trần Đại Quang's in September.

== Evaluation of the new leadership ==
Trong's reappointment was an important development that set the tone for Vietnam's politics and direction after the conference. The primary task of his mission was to reaffirm the authority of the party in all decisions, to alleviate corruption and rent-seeking behavior, and to provide a sense of direction for the next phase of Vietnam's doi moi efforts. The new leadership suggests that the party and government leadership is now more united in fighting corruption and promoting economic reforms. As such, several powerful figures have entered the politburo and are playing a significant role into the state's development plan: Nguyen Xuan Phuc, a former deputy prime minister and economist by training, was appointed prime minister; Nguyen Thi Kim Ngan, former Vice-Chair of the National Assembly became Chairwoman of the legislature, making her the first woman to ever hold that post; Vuong Dinh Hue, a former head of the party central economic committee, became the Deputy Prime Minister; Dinh The Huynh, the previous party's propaganda chief took the position of Executive Secretary of the party secretariat. Phuc and Hue are responsible for setting a broad economic restructuring agenda and comprehensive financial sector reforms for 2016 – 2020. Huynh supports Trong's party-building efforts by preventing and rooting out elements seen as ideologically deviant or too corrupt. However, the behavior of Trong can be seen as a further attack on rent-seeking people who previously supported Dung in the name of anti-corruption. There are three main camps of speculations regarding Dung's retreat from the politburo.

The first one thinks that Dung's strategic retreat was a temporary one for a balance between the North and South. Chinese scholar Zhao Weihua and Jin Dongli announced: "Nguyen Tan Dung actively chose to "slow and retreat" and did not oppose the continued retention of Trong, but in exchange for the political ally of the southern faction, Nguyen Xuan Phuc, Tran Dai Quang and Nguyen Thị Kim Ngan." The three were pushed to the top leadership positions to balance the power of the Northern Part. In the new 19-member Politburo, the number of Southern, pro-Southern members and the North faction have reached a balance. General Secretary Nguyen Phu Trong endorsed Nguyen Ba Thanh and Vuong Dinh Hue, who were either political rivals or non-allies of Dung, as additional Politburo members, the Central Committee elected Nguyen Thien Nhan and Nguyen Thi Kim Ngan instead. Both Nhan and Ngan are from the South and are seen as Dung's close allies.

The second is rooted in the traditional political struggle between four parties: conservatives, modernizers, rent-seekers, and moderates. Scholars like Vuving see the victory as a concession between conservatives and modernizers as well as a broader coalition between policy currents by arguing that Dung's allies included mostly rent-seekers, modernizers, and moderates. Trong was backed by an even more heterogeneous coalition that comprised conservatives, modernizers, and moderates, with some rent-seekers in the mix.

The third is centered around corruption, which arouses distrust within the party and society and caused the Central Committee to turn their support to Trong's idea of economic reform and anti-corruption proposal. The economic reforms implemented by Dung are opposed by the Conservatives, who worry that excessive economic openness will cause the market to be taken away by foreign capital and cause the domestic economy to weaken. Conservatives accused Dung of being involved with economic misconduct, causing state-owned companies to close down, being unable to control large public debts, and condoning corruption. During the Dung's reign, despite economic reform by introducing foreign investment, Vietnam had also faced serious economic problems and a series of financial corruption incidents, which led to him being criticized. Some parties even asked him to step down. For Trong's faction, the anti-corruption drive and stamping out remaining elements within Dung's patronage network are two sides of the same coin.

== Further Doi Moi after 12th National Congress ==
=== Reform for economic growth ===
Due to Vietnam's current economic situation, it does not rush to privatization reform. Although privatization is conducive to the development of Vietnamese polities, the grassroots' masses still rely on state-owned enterprises in Vietnam. Privatization suffers from at least three serious shortcomings: a focus on micro-efficiency through regulation at the expense of SOE's social and public functions; laggard implementation due to misalignments of political incentives; and the shaky equitization process.

These three shortcomings hinder the improvement of the country's three aspects: first, the recent reforms have little concern for the social or public functions of state-owned enterprises, but rather focus on allowing state-owned enterprises to perform limited business functions. Second, the central government wants to accelerate and control the reform of state-owned enterprises, while other parts of the state – especially local, provincial, or departmental – are resistant to these efforts. Third, the process of the fairness of instability and instability - the process of fairness is mainly concentrated in small state-owned enterprises.

After Trong came into power, state-owned enterprises (SOEs) still account for about 40% of Vietnam's economic output. Trong with his cabinet started to take measures to cut red tape, streamlining the bureaucracy, clean up the banking system, reform the SOEs, and carry out political reform.

==== Cutting red tape ====
Cutting red tape means to provide a favourable environment for investment, one of the most important factors is the reduction of regulations and paperwork. In June, Prime Minister Phuc instructed various government ministries and offices to create the "most favourable conditions" for investment and eliminate "unnecessary investment requirements".

In September 2017, by Phuc's instructions, the Ministry of Industry and Trade decided to reduce and simplify investment requirements within the jurisdiction of the ministry for 2017–18. This decision cut 675 investment requirements—the largest cut in the history of the ministry. After the cut, only 541 investment requirements remained. Government resolution 112/NQ-CP tabled on 30 October 2017 abolishing the registration book (so ho khau) to manage and control people's place of residence. The primary intention of cutting red tape is to simplify SOE privatization.

==== Cleaning up banking system ====
Cleaning up the banking system is closely related to the anti-graft campaign, which also engages in part of the political reform in Vietnam. The anti-graft campaign began with a move against the "biggest case" of economic corruption involving Vietnam Construction Joint Stock Commercial Bank (VNCB), where the bank's CEO Pham Cong Danh and his associates were charged with embezzlement and loss totalling over 401 million dollars. Furthermore, in 2017, the anti-corruption campaign affected the Communist Party such that Dinh La Thang, member of the Politburo and party secretary of Ho Chi Minh City, was the first person to be removed from the Politburo for corruption on the grounds of committing serious mistakes and violations while leading Petro Vietnam. After this event, the Politburo issued regulations to inspect the assets of approximately 1,000 senior officials regardless of activity.

More upper-level personnel have been involved in this campaign. The decision to punish a retired official — unprecedented in Vietnamese politics — was a warning signal to currently serving officials. Government ministries are reported to be working on new legislation that would allow for the "fair and strict punishment" of state officials retroactively. According to previous speculation on Trong's vigorous anti-corruption campaign, power will be more concentrated on the general secretary, which is one of the various reforms that the Central Committee hopes to avoid but cannot oppose.

==== Streamlining the bureaucracy ====
Streamlining the bureaucracy began with SOE restructure and reducing their number and importance in the national economy through privatization. Conventional wisdom in post-Cold War economics favored privatization reforms and cast a pessimistic light on Vietnamese SOEs, noting that SOEs still account for about 40% of Vietnam's economic output. According to patron-client theory, rent-seekers benefited by supporting Dung's cabinet; for example, Nguyen Sinh Hung was a rent-seeker who was financially and operationally backed by businesses under his patronage. To strike corruption, Trong requires "scaling down the role it plays in the economy".

Due to Vietnam's current economic situation, it is not rushing to privatization reform, although the data is sufficient to show that privatization is beneficial to the development of Vietnamese polities. Privatization suffers from at least three serious shortcomings: a focus on micro-efficiency through regulation at the expense of SOE's social and public functions, laggard implementation due to misalignments of political incentives, and the shaky equitization process.

Meanwhile, a Vietnam scholar suggests that "the firms who were managed more leanly (e.g. lower cost structures, lower buffer liquidity holdings), with a greater tolerance or appetite for risk (material capital expenditures funded chiefly through debt) and with a greater capacity to expand at a rate commensurate with demand, given easier access to capital notwithstanding the concerns we expressed above to how that capital was typically structured." The firms refer to the privatized SOEs.

==== Political reform ====
Pham Quy Ngo said that enabling government could only succeed if its institutional reform in the economy was carried out in parallel with institutional reform in politics. To him, laws must be changed to guarantee private ownership, equality between economic sectors and components, and "civil, economic and political rights, such as freedom of association, freedom of information, the right to demonstrate and peaceful expression ... together with personal responsibilities must be regulated by law in a civilized manner". At the fifth plenum of the CCP on 5 – 10 May 2017, the Central Committee resolved to pursue three objectives: "completing the socialist-oriented market economy institution; continuing to re-organize, renovate and improve the efficiency of State-owned enterprises; and develop the private economy into an important driving force of the socialist-oriented market economy".

=== Foreign Policy ===
Four major themes form Vietnam's foreign policy framework: independence and self-reliance, multilateralism and diversification of external relations, struggle and cooperation, and pro-active international integration.

Vietnam's policy of multilateralism and diversifying its foreign relations was endorsed by all subsequent national party congresses from the eighth (1996) onward. The Political Report to the 12th National Congress held in January 2016 stated, "To ensure successful implementation of foreign policy and international integration ... consistently carry out the foreign policy of independence, autonomy, peace, cooperation, and development ... [and] diversify and multilateralism external relations." and "to ensure successful implementation of foreign policy and international integration... [Vietnam must] be proactive and active in international integration; to be a friend, reliable partner, and a responsible member of the international community..."

The practice of Vietnamese successful foreign policy depends on two important factors: the presence and credible commitment of the United States to serve as a counterweight to the increasing assertiveness of China, and ASEAN unity to provide Vietnam with some sort of bargaining power in dealing with major powers. The foreign policy maintains their relationships with both countries to prevent bigger conflicts with the other.

Vietnam's foreign policy is shifting to protect a constant development in the region and a continuous benefit from international integration. After Trump's presidency, some scholars made comparisons and concluded that Trump's foreign policy may make it difficult for Vietnam to place itself between China and the United States. Nguyen Manh Hung pointed out that Trump exerts an unstable factor in this region: "Trump's well-known unpredictability, his administration's policy towards China introduced uncertainty in the future of U.S.–Vietnam relations and renewed Vietnam's fear of possible collusion between the United States and China at its expense."

At the same time, the discussion on Vietnam's Sino-US relations was abandoned by interpreting the ideological norms of Vietnam's foreign policy in different eras, which made Vietnam's diplomatic norms even more unpredictable and this manifestation is closer to the assertion of realist scholars.
