= Phạm Thị Hải Chuyền =

Vietnamese politician (born 1952)

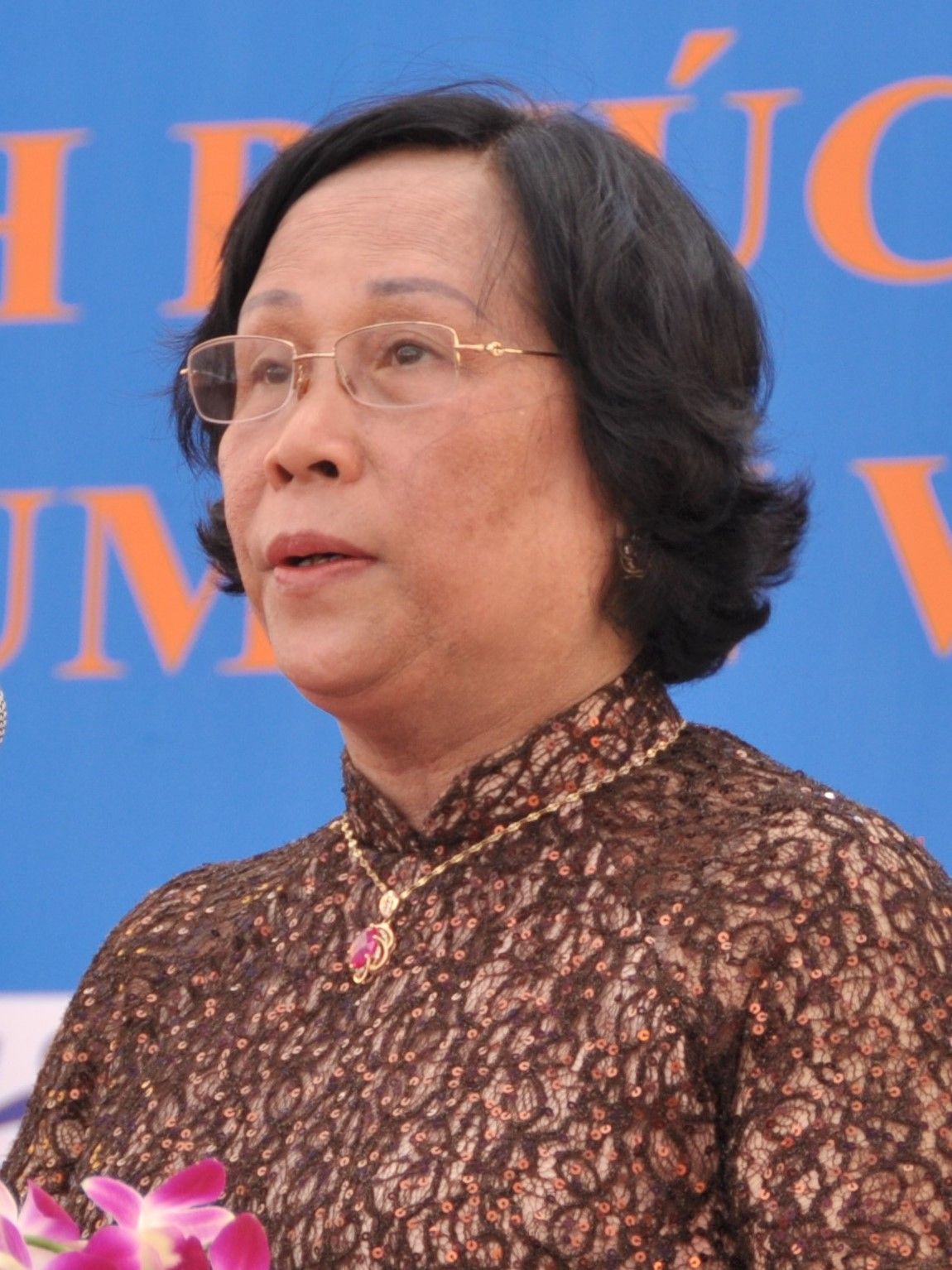
- Phạm Thị Hải Chuyền at an event in Hanoi in 2012

Minister of Labour, Invalids and Social Affairs
- In office 2011–2016
- Prime Minister: Nguyễn Tấn Dũng
- Preceded by: Nguyễn Thị Kim Ngân

Personal details
- Born: 19 August 1952 (age 74) Yên Dũng district, Bắc Giang, French Indochina
- Party: Communist Party of Vietnam

Phạm Thị Hải Chuyền (born 19 August 1952) is a Vietnamese politician of the Communist Party of Vietnam. She was Minister of Labour, Invalids and Social Affairs in the Government of Vietnam.

== Biography ==
Phạm Thị Hải Chuyền was born on 19 August 1952 in the Yên Dũng district, Bắc Giang. Before entering politics, she was an Agricultural Economics Engineer.

From 2011, she served as Minister of Labour, Invalids and Social Affairs in the Government of Vietnam for five years, and has also worked as Secretary of the Party Personnel Committee and Chairman of the People's Committee of Bắc Giang Province. She was a member of the Central Committee of the Communist Party of Vietnam for the 10th and 11th terms, and a member of the National Assembly of Vietnam for the 10th term.
