= 12th Central Inspection Commission of the Communist Party of Vietnam =

Central Inspection Commission of Vietnam's Communist Party

12th Central Inspection Commission
- Symbol of the Communist Party of Vietnam

27 January 2016 – 25 January 2021 (4 years, 364 days) Overview
- Type: Inspection organ
- Election: 1st Plenary Session of the 12th Central Committee

Members
- Total: 30 members
- Newcomers: 15 members (12th)
- Old: 6 members (11th)
- Reelected: 14 members (13th)

The 12th Central Inspection Commission, formally the Central Inspection Commission of the 12th Central Committee of the Communist Party of Vietnam (CPV, Vietnamese: Ủy ban Kiểm tra Trung ương Đảng Cộng sản Việt Nam khóa XII), was elected on 27 January 2016 by the 1st Plenary Session of the 12th Central Committee during the 12th National Congress to serve for a five-year electoral term.

== Meetings ==
Meetings of the 12th Central Inspection Commission
Meeting	Date	Length	Ref.
1st Session	Not made public	Not made public	
2nd Session	23 February 2016	1 day	
3rd Session	21–22 April 2016	2 days	
4th Session	Not made public	Not made public	
5th Session	Not made public	Not made public	
6th Session	6–8 September 2016	3 days	
8th Session	28–30 November 2016	3 days	
9th Session	26 December 2016	1 day	
10th Session	Not made public	Not made public	
11th Session	15–17 February 2017	3 days	
12th Session	Not made public	Not made public	
13th Session	12–13 April 2017	2 days	
14th Session	24–26 April 2017	3 days	
15th Session	27–30 June 2017	4 days	
16th Session	25–27 July 2017	3 days	
17th Session	13–16 September 2017	4 days	
18th Session	29 September 2017	1 day	
19th Session	7–9 November 2017	3 days	
20th Session	12–13 December 2017	2 days	
21st Session	23–24 January 2018	1–2 days	
22nd Session	24–25 January 2018	1–2 days	
23rd Session	12–15 March 2018	4 days	
24th Session	23 April 2018	1 day	
25th Session	Not made public	Not made public	
26th Session	28–30 May 2018	3 days	
27th Session	27–28 June 2018	2 days	
28th Session	24–26 July 2018	3 days	
29th Session	10–12 September 2018	3 days	
30th Session	17–19 October 2018	3 days	
31st Session	12–14 November 2018	3 days	
32nd Session	3–6 December 2018	4 days	
33rd Session	14–16 January 2019	3 days	
34th Session	6–7 March 2019	2 days	
35th Session	24–26 April 2019	2 days	
36th Session	29–31 May 2019	3 days	
37th Session	2–4 July 2019	3 days	
38th Session	5–7 August 2019	3 days	
39th Session	25–27 September 2019	3 days	
40th Session	28–30 October 2019	3 days	
41st Session	4–6 December 2019	3 days	
42nd Session	3–8 January 2020	6 days	
43rd Session	2–3 March 2020	2 days	
44th Session	27–28 April 2020	2 days	
45th Session	1–4 June 2020	4 days	
46th Session	15–17 July 2020	3 days	
47th Session	11–13 August 2020	3 days	
48th Session	9–11 September 2020	3 days	
49th Session	3 November 2020	1 day	
50th Session	1–2 December 2020	2 days	

== Members ==
Members of the 12th Central Inspection Commission of the Communist Party of Vietnam
Name	11th	13th	Birth	PM	Birthplace	Education	Ethnicity	Gender	Ref.
Hồ Minh Chiến	By-elected	Elected	1965	1985	Cà Mau	Graduate	Kinh	Male	
Nghiêm Phú Cường	New	Elected	—	—	—	—	—	Male	
Nguyễn Văn Doanh	New	Not	—	—	—	—	—	Male	
Nguyễn Đức Hải	New	Not	1961	1984	Quảng Nam	Graduate	Kinh	Male	
Trần Thị Hiền	By-elected	Elected	—	—	—	—	—	Female	
Nguyễn Quốc Hiệp	New	Elected	—	—	—	—	—	Male	
Sa Như Hòa	Old	Not	—	—	—	—	—	Male	
Bùi Thị Minh Hoài	Old	Not	1965	1991	Hà Nam	Graduate	Kinh	Female	
Nguyễn Công Học	Old	Not	—	—	—	—	—	Male	
Nguyễn Văn Hội	By-elected	Elected	1961	1984	Quảng Nam	Graduate	Kinh	Male	
Nguyễn Văn Hùng	By-elected	Elected	1964	1993	Quảng Nam	Graduate	Kinh	Male	
Trần Tiến Hưng	New	Not	1976	1997	Hà Tĩnh	Postgraduate	Kinh	Male	
Vũ Khắc Hùng	New	Elected	—	—	—	—	—	Male	
Võ Minh Khương	New	Not	—	—	—	—	—	Male	
Huỳnh Thị Xuân Lam	New	Not	—	—	—	—	—	Female	
Nguyễn Thị Bích Ngà	Old	Not	—	—	—	—	—	Female	
Tô Duy Nghĩa	By-elected	Elected	—	—	—	—	—	Male	
Võ Thái Nguyên	By-elected	Elected	—	—	—	—	—	Male	
Nguyễn Văn Nhân	New	Elected	—	—	—	—	—	Male	
Nguyễn Minh Quang	By-elected	Elected	—	—	—	—	—	Male	
Nguyễn Thanh Sơn	New	Not	1962	1986	Hà Nội	Graduate	Kinh	Male	
Trần Đức Thắng	By-elected	Elected	1973	—	Vĩnh Phúc	Postgraduate	Kinh	Male	
Cao Văn Thống	New	Elected	—	—	—	—	—	Male	
Tô Quang Thu	Old	Not	—	—	—	—	—	Male	
Nguyễn Thế Toàn	New	Not	—	—	—	—	—	Male	
Hoàng Văn Trà	By-elected	Not	1964	1984	Nghệ An	Graduate	Kinh	Male	
Hà Quốc Trị	New	Not	1969	1990	Vĩnh Phúc	Graduate	Kinh	Male	
Mai Trực	New	Not	1957	1979	Khánh Hòa	Undergraduate	Kinh	Male	
Trần Cẩm Tú	Old	Elected	1961	1990	Hà Tĩnh	Graduate	Kinh	Male	
Trần Quốc Vượng	New	Not	1953	1979	Thái Bình	Graduate	Kinh	Male	
