= Ngô Văn Dụ =

Vietnamese politician

Chairman of the Central Inspection Commission of the Communist Party of Vietnam
- In office 19 January 2011 – 28 January 2016
- Preceded by: Nguyễn Văn Chi
- Succeeded by: Trần Quốc Vượng

Member of the Secretariat
- In office 25 April 2006 – 28 January 2016

Member of the Politburo
- In office 19 January 2011 – 28 January 2016

Personal details
- Born: 21 December 1947 (age 77); Vĩnh Phúc Province
- Political party: Communist Party

Ngô Văn Dụ (Vietnamese pronunciation: [ŋo˧˧ van˧˧ zu˧˨ʔ]; born 21 December 1947 in Vĩnh Phúc Province) is a Vietnamese politician who served as the Chairman of the Central Commission for Inspection of the Communist Party of Vietnam from 2011 to 2016. Ngô Văn Dụ was a member of the 11th Politburo, in which he was ranked 12th.
