= Nguyễn Thiện Nhân =

Vietnamese politician (born 1953)

His Excellency Professor Nguyễn Thiện Nhân
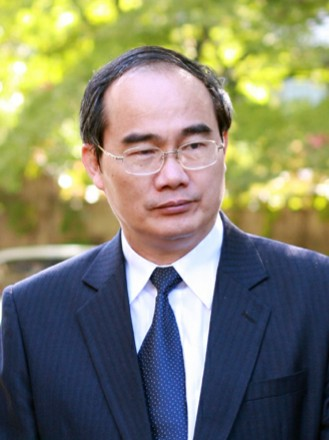
- Nhân in 2010

Member of the National Assembly
- In office 20 May 2007 – 21 March 2026
- Constituency: Bắc Giang (20 May 2007 – 22 May 2016); Trà Vinh (22 May 2016 – 15 May 2017); Ho Chi Minh City (since 15 May 2017)
- Majority: 84,87% (364,988 votes)

Party Secretary of Ho Chi Minh City
- In office 10 May 2017 – 17 October 2020
- Preceded by: Đinh La Thăng
- Succeeded by: Nguyễn Văn Nên

Chairman of the Central Committee of the Vietnamese Fatherland Front
- In office 5 September 2013 – 22 June 2017
- Preceded by: Huỳnh Đảm
- Succeeded by: Trần Thanh Mẫn

Member of the Politburo
- In office 11 May 2013 – 31 January 2021
- General Secretary: Nguyễn Phú Trọng

Deputy Prime Minister of Vietnam
- In office 2 August 2007 – 11 November 2013
- Prime Minister: Nguyễn Tấn Dũng
- Preceded by: Phạm Gia Khiêm
- Succeeded by: Vũ Đức Đam

Minister of Education
- In office 28 June 2006 – 17 June 2010
- Prime Minister: Nguyễn Tấn Dũng
- Preceded by: Nguyễn Minh Hiển
- Succeeded by: Phạm Vũ Luận

Personal details
- Born: 12 June 1953 (age 73) Cà Mau province, State of Vietnam
- Party: Communist Party of Vietnam
- Education: Military Medical Academy of Vietnam; Otto-von-Guericke University Magdeburg (BS, PhD)

Military service
- Allegiance: Vietnam
- Branch/service: Vietnam People's Army
- Years of service: 1970–1983
- Rank: Senior lieutenant

Nguyễn Thiện Nhân (Vietnamese pronunciation: [ŋwiən˦ˀ˥ tʰiən˧˨ʔ ɲən˧˧]; born 12 June 1953) is a Vietnamese economist, engineer, professor and politician. He is formerly a member of the National Assembly representing Ho Chi Minh City, where he served as its party secretary (de facto mayor) from 2017 until his retirement in 2020. A member of the 11th and 12th Politburo of the Communist Party, he previously served as Chairman of the Vietnamese Fatherland Front from 2013 to 2017 and as Deputy Prime Minister and Minister of Education during Nguyễn Tấn Dũng's premiership. Prior to entering national politics, he worked as a systems engineer in the military before pivoting to academia and then serving in the municipal administration of Ho Chi Minh City, where he was its deputy mayor from 2001 to 2006. He received a BS and a PhD in Cybernetics from the Otto-von-Guericke University Magdeburg in East Germany and the Military Medical Academy of Vietnam.

== Early life and career ==
Nguyễn Thiện Nhân was born on 12 June 1953 in Cà Mau, Vietnam. His family is originally from Chau Thanh, Trà Vinh province. His father Nguyễn Thiện Thành was a professor and a doctor. His father was an intellectual who was active in the Vietnamese independence movement. Under the provisions of the Geneva Accords of 1954, his father brought his family to the North to live in the part of Vietnam under the Government of the Democratic Republic of Vietnam.

Encouraged by his father, after high school, in June 1970, he enlisted in the Vietnam People's Army as a cadet in the field of engineering. In 1972, he was sent to study abroad at the Technical University of Magdeburg (German: Technische Hochschule Magdeburg) in East Germany. He was commissioned a Second Lieutenant in 1976.

In 1979, he successfully defended his PhD thesis in Cybernetics. His doctoral dissertation is Untersuchungen zur automatischen Steuerung der optimalen Fahrweise von Fernwärmeversorgungssystemen (Automated Control Research for the Optimum Operating Method of the Heating System) . After returning home in 1980, he worked as a researcher at the Controlled Arms Institute of the Military Institute of Technology under the Ministry of Defense (now the Missile Institute of the Military Science and Technology Institute) until 1983. Also in 1980, he was admitted to the Communist Party of Vietnam. He was promoted to First Lieutenant in 1980, Senior Lieutenant in 1982.

Nguyễn Thiện Nhân is known for a number of efforts in reforming the Vietnamese education system, widely supported by the Vietnamese public. He is also one of the senior officials in the Vietnamese government who has a good command of English along with Hoàng Trung Hải, another vice prime minister. Mr. Nhan is fluent in both English and German.

He replaced Đinh La Thăng as the Secretary of the Communist Party of Vietnam for Ho Chi Minh City beginning on 10 May 2017.

On the evening of 17 October 2020, Nguyen Van Nen was elected Secretary of the HCMC Party Committee for the term of 2020–2025, replacing Nguyen Thien Nhan. Mr. Nguyen Thien Nhan was assigned by the Politburo to continue to monitor and direct the HCMC Party Committee until the end of the 13th National Party Congress (taking place in January 2021).

== Awards and honors ==
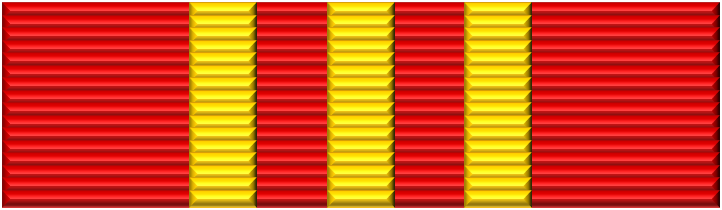
- Order of Ho Chi Minh (2025)
