= Hoàng Trung Hải =

Secretary of the Hanoi Party Committee
- In office 5 February 2016 – 7 February 2020
- Preceded by: Phạm Quang Nghị
- Succeeded by: Vương Đình Huệ

Deputy Prime Minister of Vietnam
- In office 27 August 2007 – 8 April 2016
- Prime Minister: Nguyễn Tấn Dũng

Personal details
- Born: 27 September 1959 (age 66) Commune of Quỳnh Giao, Quỳnh Phụ District, Thái Bình Province, Vietnam
- Party: Communist Party

Hoàng Trung Hải (Vietnamese pronunciation: [hwaːŋ˨˩ t͡ɕʊwŋ͡m˧˧ haːj˧˩]; born September 27, 1959, in Thái Bình Province) is a Vietnamese Politician and was the Communist Secretary of the Party Committee in Ha Noi City, a post he began to take from 5 February 2016. He was a member of the 12th Politburo, and served in the Central Committee from the 9th to the 12th electoral term. He was the Deputy Prime Minister of Vietnam from 27 August 2007 to 5 February 2016. Before taking this post, he had been the Minister of Industry of Vietnam.

Hoàng Trung Hải graduated from Hanoi University of Technology with a degree in power systems. He also gained an MBA from Trinity College Dublin, Ireland. On February 7, 2020, he was made Deputy Director of the Document Drafting Subcommittee of the 13th National Congress of the Communist Party of Vietnam.
