= Nguyễn Nhân Chiến =

Vietnamese politician

Secretary of the Bắc Ninh Province Party Committee
- Incumbent
- Assumed office 2015

Personal details
- Born: 20 February 1960 (age 66) Bắc Ninh, Vietnam
- Party: ~~Communist Party~~ (-2024, expelled)

Nguyễn Nhân Chiến (born 20 February 1960, in Bắc Ninh Province) is the Secretary of the Party Committee in Bắc Ninh province. He was a member of the 12th Central Committee.
