= Đinh La Thăng =

Vietnamese politician

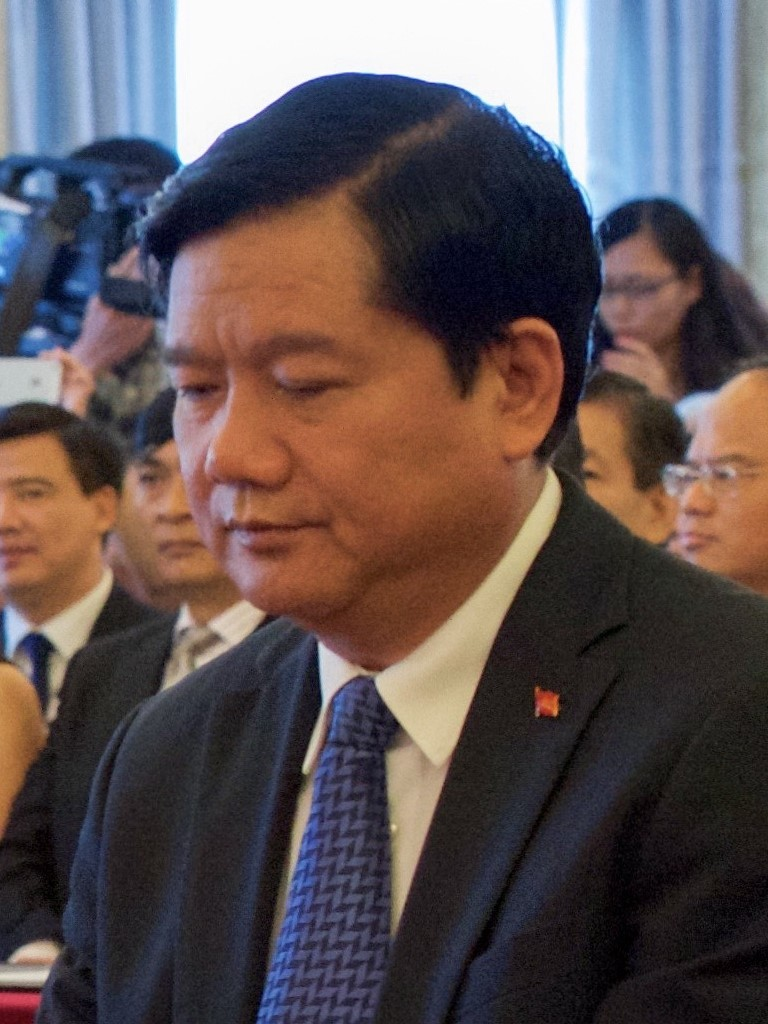

Secretary of the Ho Chi Minh City Party Committee
- In office 5 February 2016 – 10 May 2017
- Preceded by: Lê Thanh Hải
- Succeeded by: Nguyễn Thiện Nhân

Minister of Transport
- In office 8 August 2011 – 8 April 2016
- Prime Minister: Nguyễn Tấn Dũng
- Preceded by: Hồ Nghĩa Dũng
- Succeeded by: Trương Quang Nghĩa

Chairman of Petrovietnam
- In office 5 October 2006 – 3 August 2011
- Prime Minister: Nguyen Tan Dung

Member of the Politburo
- In office 27 January 2016 – 7 May 2017

Personal details
- Born: 10 April 1960 (age 66) Yên Bình, Ý Yên, Nam Định Province, North Vietnam
- Party: Communist Party of Vietnam (1985–2018)
- Education: Academy of Finance

Đinh La Thăng (Vietnamese pronunciation: [ʔɗïŋ˧˧ laː˧˧ tʰaŋ˧˧]; 10 September 1960) is a Vietnamese former politician who served as Minister of Transport, Communist Party Secretary of Ho Chi Minh City, and member of the Politburo. On 22 January 2018 he became the first top Party official in several decades to be tried and sentenced to prison for political corruption.

== Early life and education ==
Đinh La Thăng was born in 1960 in Yên Bình Commune, Ý Yên District, Nam Định Province, and graduated from the University of Hanoi's School of Finance and Accounting (now the Academy of Finance).

== Career ==
He was a member of the 10th and 11th Central Committees of the Communist Party of Vietnam, a member of the 12th Politburo of the Communist Party of Vietnam, and also a member of the National Assembly of Vietnam from the XIth through XIIIth sessions.

He was the chairman of the Board of PetroVietnam, the national oil and gas company; Deputy Secretary of the Communist Party of Thừa Thiên–Huế Province (November 2003-December 2005); and Chairman of Song Da Corporation before he became the Minister of Transport. (April 2001-October 2003).

When controversy erupted in May–June 2016 over the Americans' appointment of Bob Kerrey as chairman of the Board of Trustees of Fulbright University Vietnam (on 25 February 1969 Kerrey had commanded the U.S. Navy SEALS unit that carried out the Thạnh Phong massacre), Đinh La Thăng was the only high-ranking Vietnamese official who publicly supported the selection of Kerrey.

On 7 May 2017, Đinh La Thăng was expelled from his position in the Politburo due to his violations of the law while chairman of the Board of PetroVietnam. These violations led to embarrassing economic losses.

He was arrested on 8 December 2017 for investigation into his mismanagement of PetroVietnam and bribery, resulting in a loss of 800 billion VND (approximately US$35.28 million) from its investment in Oceanbank. On 22 January 2018, he was sentenced to 13 years in prison.

He was tried again on 14 and 15 December 2020 for his involvement in another corruption scandal and received 10 years in prison.

== Personal life ==
He has a daughter, Đinh Hương Ly (born 1984), who worked for Morgan Stanley from 2006 to 2013.
