= Nguyễn Sinh Hùng =

Vietnamese politician (born 1946)

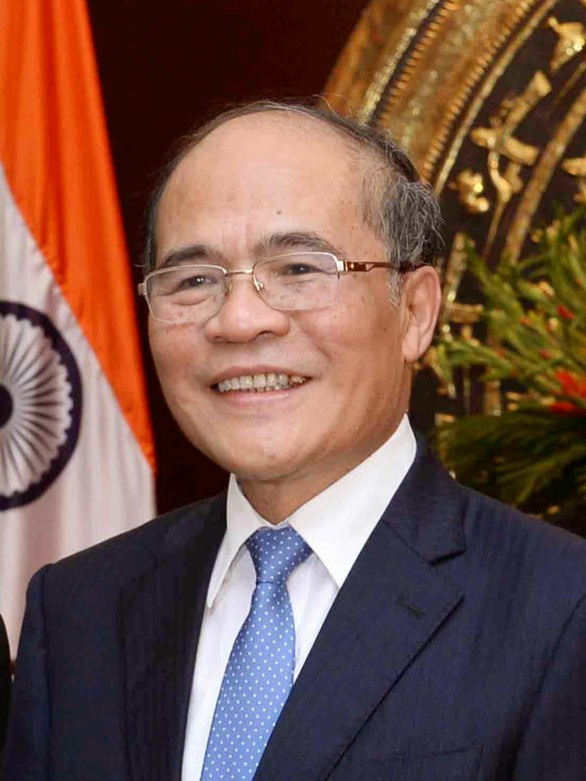
- Nguyễn Sinh Hùng in 2014

Chairman of the National Assembly of Vietnam
- In office 23 July 2011 – 31 March 2016
- Deputy: Tòng Thị Phóng; Nguyễn Thị Kim Ngân; Uông Chu Lưu; Huỳnh Ngọc Sơn
- Preceded by: Nguyễn Phú Trọng
- Succeeded by: Nguyễn Thị Kim Ngân

Member of the Politburo
- In office 25 April 2006 – 28 January 2016

Permanent Deputy Prime Minister of Vietnam
- In office 28 June 2006 – 25 July 2011
- Prime Minister: Nguyễn Tấn Dũng
- Preceded by: Nguyễn Tấn Dũng
- Succeeded by: Nguyễn Xuân Phúc

Minister of Finance
- In office November 1996 – 28 June 2006
- Prime Minister: Võ Văn Kiệt; Phan Văn Khải
- Preceded by: Hồ Tế
- Succeeded by: Vũ Văn Ninh

Personal details
- Born: 18 January 1946 (age 80) Nghệ An Province, Vietnam
- Party: Communist Party of Vietnam
- Education: University of National and World Economy

Nguyễn Sinh Hùng (Vietnamese pronunciation: [ŋwiən˦ˀ˥ sïŋ˧˧ hʊwŋ͡m˨˩]; born 18 January 1946) is a Vietnamese politician who served as Chairman of the National Assembly of Vietnam from 2011 to 2016. Nguyễn Sinh Hùng was previously one of the country's four "key leaders" (lãnh đạo chủ chốt), along with Party General Secretary Nguyễn Phú Trọng, President Trương Tấn Sang and Prime Minister Nguyễn Tấn Dũng, during the 11th National Congress of the Communist Party of Vietnam . He graduated from the University of National and World Economy in Bulgaria.

== Early life ==
Nguyễn Sinh Hùng was born on January 18, 1946, in the Nguyễn Sinh family in Nam Đàn District in Nghệ An province. He graduated from junior high school and then went to high school in Việt Đức (Hanoi). His family once lived in 54 Phố Huế Street. He was a student at the University of Finance and Accounting (now the Academy of Finance) (1966–1970). On January 1, 1972, Nguyễn Sinh Hùng was employed as an officer at the Central Bank for the Construction of the Ministry of Finance.

== Political career ==
Nguyễn Sinh Hùng joined the Communist Party of Vietnam on May 26, 1977, and was granted formal membership on May 26, 1978. On June 28, 2006, Nguyễn Sinh Hùng was approved by the National Assembly as the 1st Deputy Prime Minister, following the proposal of Prime Minister Nguyễn Tấn Dũng to undertake joint work in the government's work management system. To be assigned the task of the Prime Minister when the Prime Minister is absent or authorized by the Prime Minister.

Deputy Prime Minister Nguyễn Sinh Hùng also served as head of the Restructuring Steering Committee of Vietnam Shipbuilding Industry Corporation (Vinashin) after the Vinashin case was wrongly dealt a debt of $5 billion and unable to pay. Speaking to the press in October 2010, he said: by the beginning of November, it will be a "new Vinashin." On July 23, 2011, Nguyễn Sinh Hùng was elected by the National Assembly Chairman of the 13th National Assembly from 2011 to 2016 with 91.4% of the vote (457/497 delegates agreed). Speaking at the ceremony, Hùng said: "Members of the Standing Committee of the 13th National Assembly will always improve their skills, resolutely fight against bureaucracy, fight against corruption, wastefulness, attachment and settlement. Hear the opinions of the people, truly represent the will and will of the people. "

Nguyễn Sinh Hùng was permanent Deputy Prime Minister (1st Deputy Prime Minister) from 2006 to 2011. Previously the finance minister from 1996 to 2006, He served as head of the State Treasury. When the 2011 congress selected a Politburo, or executive committee; Hùng was ranked 4th on its list of members.

On March 30, 2016, the National Assembly of Vietnam passed the resolution on the dismissal of the Chairman of the National Assembly of review. Nguyễn Thị Kim Ngân replaced his position as the Chairman of the National Assembly on 31 March 2016.

== Awards and honors ==
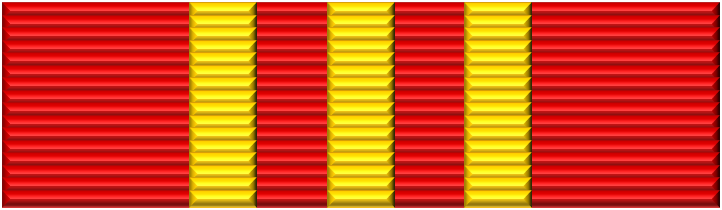
- Order of Ho Chi Minh (2025)
