= Ngô Thị Thanh Hằng =

Vietnamese politician

Ngô Thị Thanh Hằng (born 27 April 1960) is a Vietnamese politician. She was a member of the 12th Central Committee of the Communist Party of Vietnam, Member of the Standing Committee of the Hanoi Party Committee, Deputy Secretary of the Hanoi Party Committee, Delegate of the Hanoi People's Council.
