= Nguyễn Thị Kim Ngân =

Vietnamese politician

Her Excellency Nguyễn Thị Kim Ngân
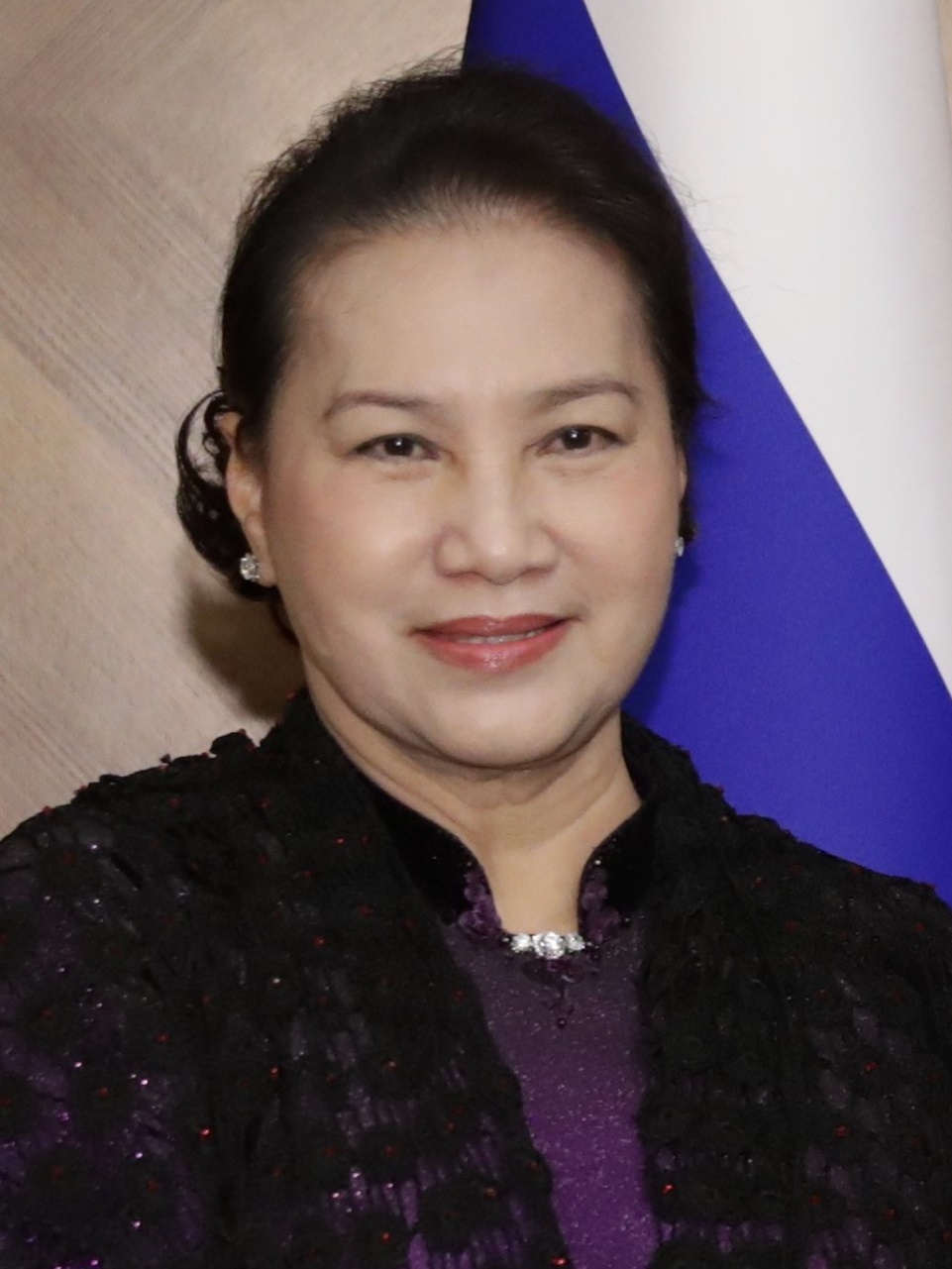
- Nguyễn Thị Kim Ngân in 2019

Chairwoman of the National Assembly of Vietnam
- In office 31 March 2016 – 31 March 2021
- Preceded by: Nguyễn Sinh Hùng
- Succeeded by: Vương Đình Huệ

Deputy Chair of the National Assembly
- In office 23 July 2011 – 31 March 2016
- Chairman: Nguyễn Sinh Hùng

Member of the Politburo
- In office 11 May 2013 – 31 January 2021
Ministerial offices 2006–2011 1995–2002
Minister of Labour, Invalids and Social Affairs
In office 2 August 2007 – 23 July 2011
Prime Minister	Nguyễn Tấn Dũng
Preceded by	Nguyễn Thị Hằng
Succeeded by	Phạm Thị Hải Chuyền
Permanent Deputy Trade Minister
In office March 2006 – August 2007
Minister	Trương Đình Tuyển
Deputy Finance Minister
In office February 2006 – March 2006
In office April 1995 – September 2002

Party Secretary of Hải Dương
- In office September 2002 – February 2006
- Preceded by: Nguyễn Văn Chiền
- Succeeded by: Bùi Thanh Quyến

Personal details
- Born: 12 April 1954 (age 72) Giồng Trôm, Bến Tre Province, State of Vietnam (now Vietnam)
- Party: Communist Party of Vietnam (1981–present)

Nguyễn Thị Kim Ngân (Vietnamese pronunciation: [ŋwiən˦ˀ˥ tʰi˧˨ʔ kim˧˧ ŋən˧˧]; born 12 April 1954, in Bến Tre Province) is a Vietnamese economist and politician. She is the first woman in Vietnamese history to head the country's legislature, serving as the eleventh Chair of the National Assembly of Vietnam from 2016 to 2021. She was a member of the 12th Politburo of the Communist Party, the country's highest decision-making body, in which she ranked second after General Secretary Nguyễn Phú Trọng.

Ngân previously served in the cabinet of Nguyễn Tấn Dũng from 2006 to 2011 under various ministries. Prior to entering national politics, she held the post of Party Secretary (de facto Governor) of Hải Dương province from 2002 to 2006, being the first woman to hold this position and the only female provincial chief in Vietnam at that time.

== Early life ==
Nguyễn Thị Kim Ngân was born on 12 April 1954 at the commune of Châu Hòa in Giồng Trôm District, Bến Tre Province. Her mother Nguyễn Thị Sang (died in 2006), commonly known as Má Sáu, is the secret basis of Bến Tre revolution. During the Vietnam War, her family was active in the National Front for the Liberation of South Vietnam. She was raised by her mother and educated in the territories controlled by the Republic of Vietnam.

== Education ==
In 1973, she went to Saigon (nowadays Ho Chi Minh City) to study at the Saigon Literature College of the University of Saigon, but her studies were interrupted when the National Liberation Front took control of the South.

She later attended the University of Finance (nowadays the National Academy of Finance), earning a bachelor in financial management. Ngân also earned a master of economics in credit management at the University of Economics Ho Chi Minh City. She held an advanced degree in political theory.

In 2018, she was conferred the honorary doctorate in political science by the Pukyong National University in South Korea.

== Career ==
Ngân was admitted to the Communist Party of Vietnam on 9 December 1981 and became a full member of the Party a year later.

She graduated from the rank of Deputy Manager, Head of Department, Deputy Director, Acting Director and was officially appointed Director of Ben Tre Finance Department in October 1991. In April 1995, she was sent to the Central Government and was appointed Deputy Minister of Finance, serving until 2002.

In September 2002, she become the Party Secretary (de facto Governor) of Hải Dương province (2002-2006). Ngân was the first woman to hold this position and the only female provincial chief in Vietnam at that time.

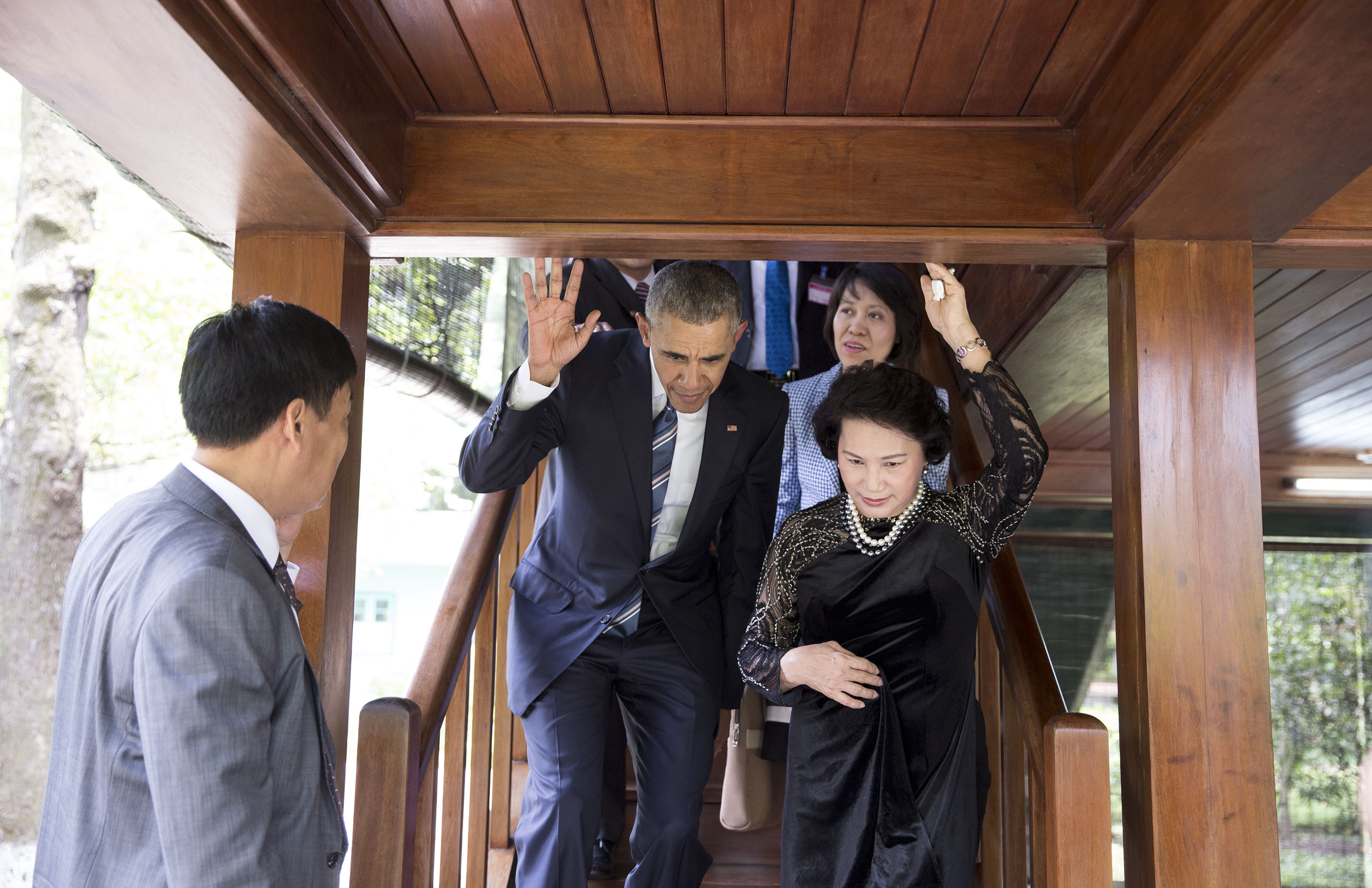
Chairwoman Ngân and President Obama at the Ho Chi Minh's Stilt House, Hanoi in 2016

In February 2006, she was transferred to the Ministry of Finance before being appointed the Permanent Deputy Minister of Trade, serving from March 2006 to August 2007. She was then appointed by Nguyễn Tấn Dũng to head the Ministry of Labor, Invalids and Social Affairs, where she gained national prominence for playing a key role in the rescue of 10,000 Vietnamese migrant workers during the Libyan crisis in 2011.

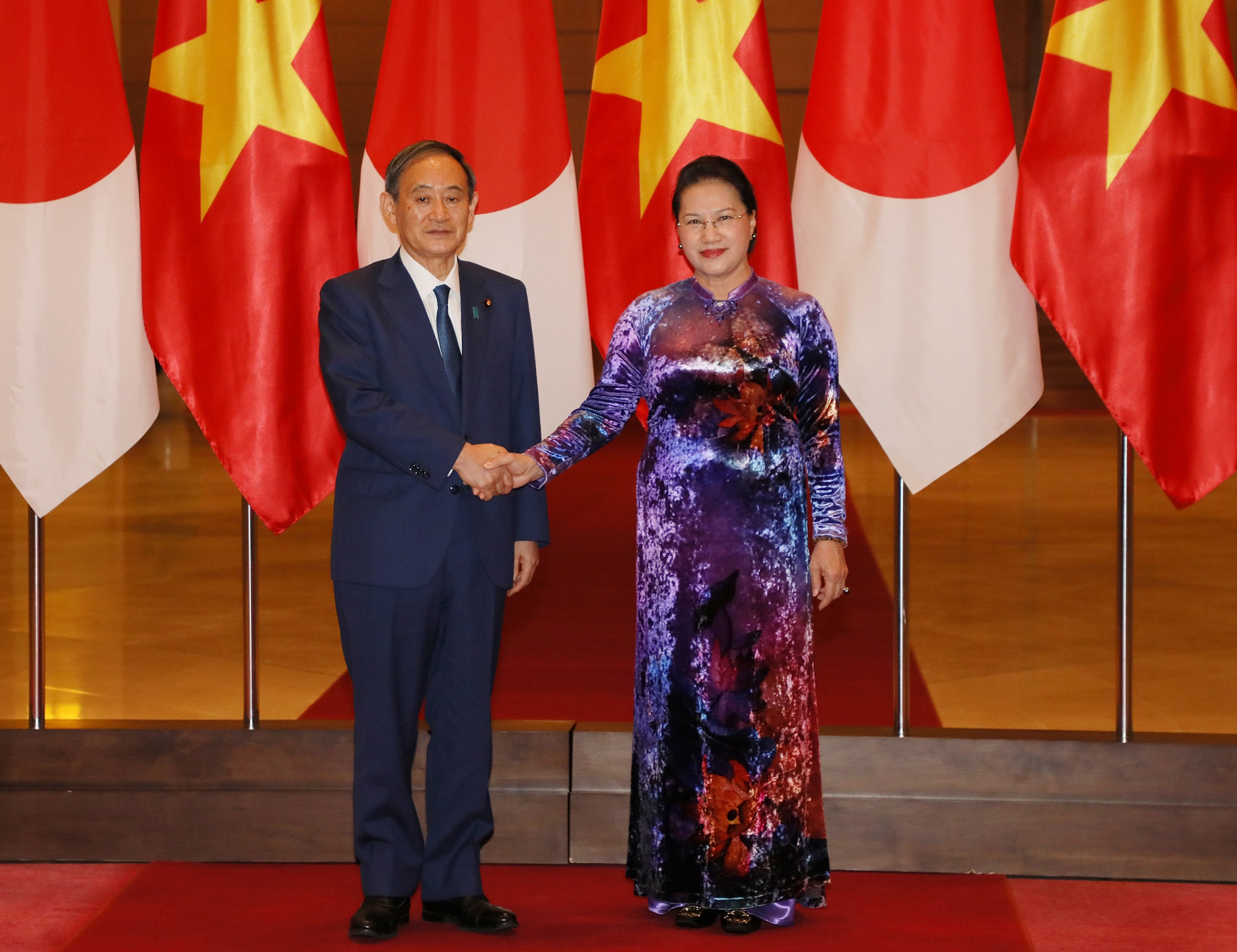
Chairwoman Ngân and Prime Minister Suga in 2020

In May 2011, she was elected Deputy Chair of the National Assembly. In 2013, she became a member of the 11th Politburo, the country's highest decision-making body. In 2016, she was elected Chair of the National Assembly, becoming the first woman in Vietnamese history to head the legislature and occupy one of the four pillars of leadership. She ranked second in the 12th Politburo after Former General Secretary Nguyễn Phú Trọng.

In a YouGov survey in late 2020, Ngân was voted among the five most admired female figures among the Vietnamese public. She retired in March 2021.

== Honours ==
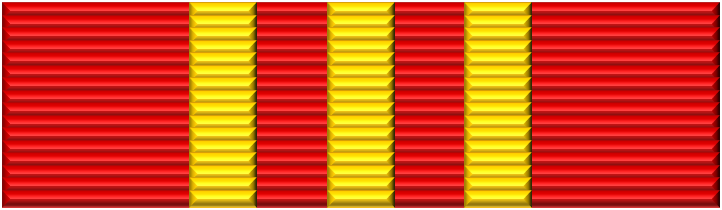
- Order of Ho Chi Minh (2025, Vietnam)
- Grand Cordon of the Order of the Rising Sun (2023, Japan)
