= Ministry of Labour – Invalids and Social Affairs =

Government ministry of Vietnam (1945–2025)

Ministry of Labour – War Invalids and Social Affairs
- Bộ Lao động – Thương binh và Xã hội
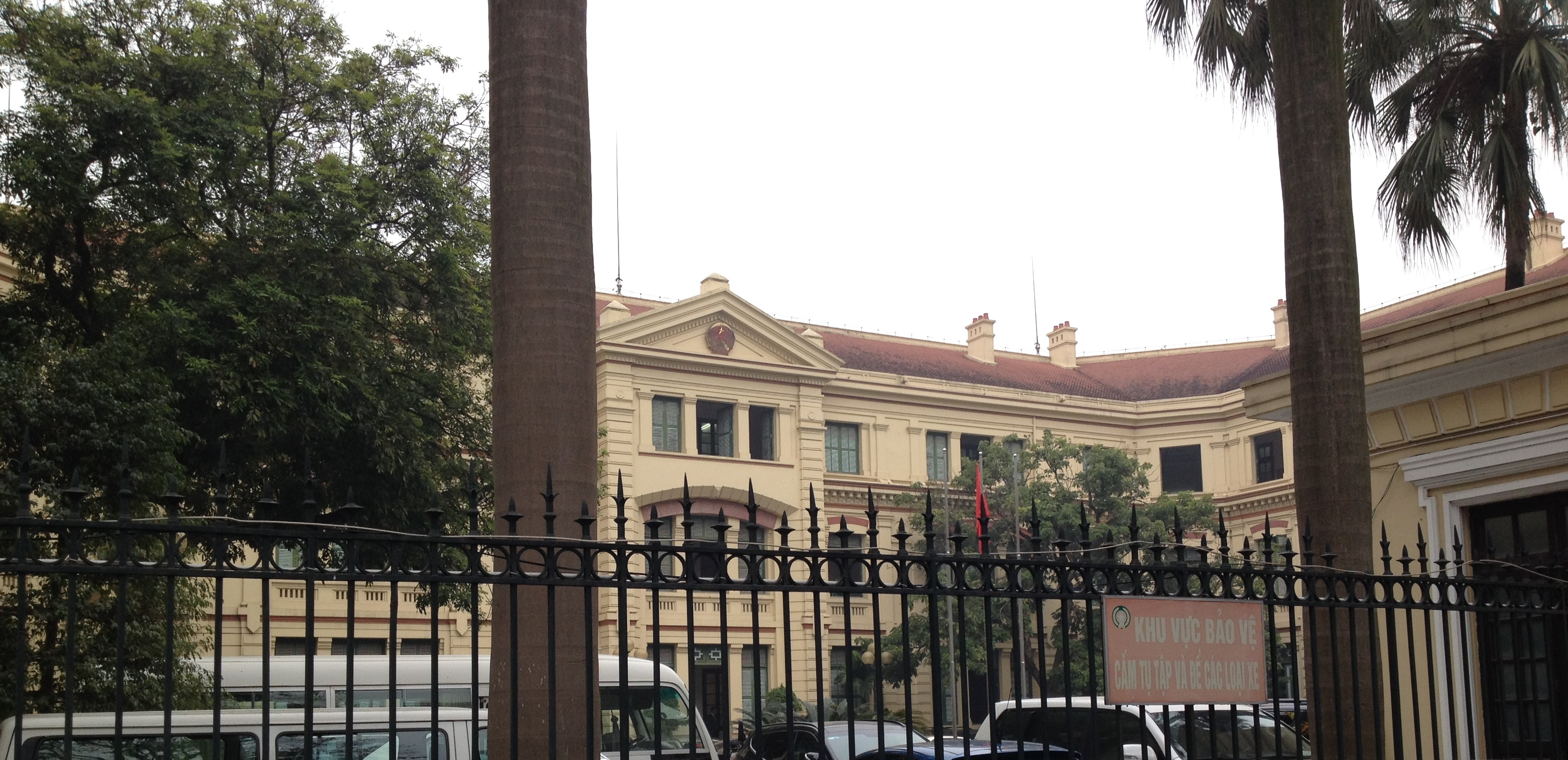
- The ministry headquarters in Hanoi.

Ministry overview
- Formed: 28 August 1945
- Preceding agencies: Ministry of Labour (1945–1946); Ministry of Social Humanitarian Support (1945–1946); Ministry of Social Affairs (1946); Ministry of Labour (1946–1987); Ministry of Humanitarian Support (1946–1947); Ministry of Invalids and Veterans (1947–1959); Ministry of Humanitarian Support (1955–1959); Ministry of Invalids and Social Affairs (1975–1987); Ministry of Labour – Invalids and Social Affairs (1987–present)
- Type: Government Ministry
- Jurisdiction: Government of Vietnam
- Status: Merged with Ministry of Home Affairs (2025)
- Headquarters: 12 Ngo Quyen Street, Trang Tien Ward, Hoan Kiem District, Hanoi
- Annual budget: 32.872 billion VND (2018)
- Minister responsible: Đào Ngọc Dung
- Deputy Minister responsible: Lê Văn Thanh Lê Tấn Dũng Nguyễn Thị Hà Nguyễn Bá Hoan Nguyễn Văn Hồi
- Website: molisa.gov.vn

The Ministry of Labour, War Invalids and Social Affairs (MOLISA, Vietnamese: Bộ Lao động – Thương binh và Xã hội) was a ministry under the government of Vietnam responsible for state administration on labour, employment, occupational safety, social insurances and vocational training; policies for war invalids, martyrs and people with special contribution to the country; social protection and prevention of social evils; child care and gender equality.

The ministry was merged with Ministry of Home Affairs in February 2025.

== Ministerial units ==
- Department of Labour and Wage
- Department of Social Insurance
- Department of Gender Equality
- Department of Legal Affairs
- Department of Planning and Finance
- Department of International Cooperation
- Department of Organisation and Personnel
- Ministry's Inspectorate
- Ministry's Office
- General Bureau of Vocational Training
- Bureau of Employment
- Bureau of Social Assistance
- Bureau of Overseas Labour
- Bureau of Work Safety
- Bureau of Social Evils Prevention and Combat
- Bureau of National Devotees
- Bureau of Child Care and Protection

== Administrative units ==
- Institute of Labour Science and Social Affairs
- Institute of Orthopaedics & Rehabilitation
- Labour and Social Affairs Information Centre
- Labour and Society Magazine
- Dan Tri newspaper
- National Fund for Vietnamese Children
