= Tòng Thị Phóng =

Vietnamese politician

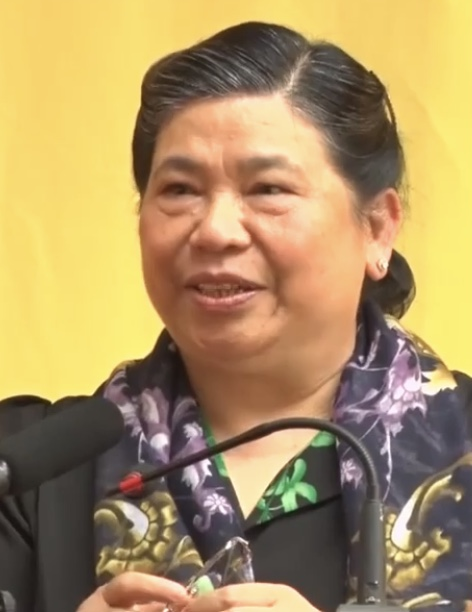

Permanent Vice Chairwoman of the National Assembly of Vietnam
- In office 23 July 2007 – 23 March 2021 Serving with Nguyễn Thị Kim Ngân and Uông Chu Lưu
- Chair: Nguyễn Phú Trọng (2006-2011); Nguyễn Sinh Hùng (2011-2016); Nguyễn Thị Kim Ngân (2016-2021)
- Preceded by: Trương Mỹ Hoa
- Succeeded by: Trần Thanh Mẫn

Member of the Politburo
- In office 19 January 2011 – 31 January 2021

Personal details
- Born: 10 February 1954 (age 72) Sơn La Province
- Party: Communist Party

Tòng Thị Phóng (Vietnamese pronunciation: [tawŋ͡m˨˩ tʰi˧˨ʔ fawŋ͡m˧˦]; born 10 February 1954 in Sơn La Province) is a Vietnamese politician who is the Vice Chairwoman of the National Assembly of Vietnam. She is a member of the 11th Politburo, in which she is ranked 11th.

== Awards and honors ==
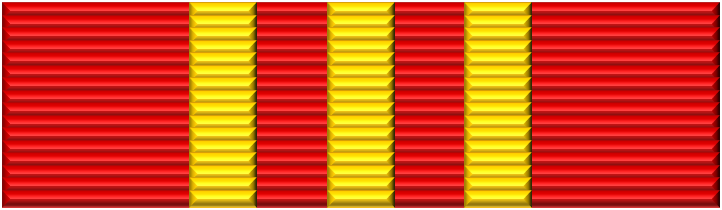
- Order of Ho Chi Minh (2025)
