= Shipbuilding Industry Corporation =

Vietnamese shipbuilding holding group

- Native name: Vietnamese: Tổng Công ty Công nghiệp tàu thủy
- Formerly: Vinashin
- Type: State-owned enterprise
- Industry: Shipbuilding, Defence
- Predecessor: Vietnam Shipbuilding Industry Group
- Founded: October 21, 2013; 13 years ago
- Defunct: First quarter of 2024 (projected)
- Headquarters: Badinh, Hanoi, Vietnam
- Area served: Worldwide
- Key people: Nguyen Ngoc Su (Chairman); Cao Thanh Dong (CEO)
- Products: Warships, Fishing vessels, Merchant vessels, Platform supply vessels, Dredgers
- Owner: Government of Vietnam
- Website: sbic.com.vn

Shipbuilding Industry Corporation (SBIC) is a state-owned shipbuilding holding group in Vietnam, which offers a variety of new building choice from merchant vessel to platform supply vessel to other custom made-to-order ships. It was established based on restructured Vietnam Shipbuilding Industry Group.

== History ==
The logo of formerly Vietnam Shipbuilding Industry Group

Shipbuilding Industry Corporation's predecessor Vietnam Shipbuilding Industry Group (Vinashin) was a state-owned shipbuilding firm in Vietnam. It was one of Vietnam's leading industrial concerns, and entered into a partnership with Damen, Kongsberg, and Hyundai. Vinashin was heavily indebted, and executives have been arrested for mismanagement, but it has been claimed that further restructuring would allow debts to be repaid within a year. Vinashin folded under a debt burden of $4.5 billion in 2010; as of March 2011, it was being restructured.

== Ports ==
In August 2010, Damen Vinashin began construction on a new shipyard on a 42-hectare (100-acre) site in Haiphong.

== Ships built ==
Vinashin constructed both merchant ships and military ships. A number of ships in the Vietnam People's Navy were built by Vinashin.

Merchant ship construction included dry cargo, tankers, lash carriers, and passenger vessels.

Vinashin was the largest shipbuilder in Vietnam, accounting for approximately 80% of shipbuilding capacity.

== Bankruptcy and disbandment ==
In 2023, the Government of Vietnam, under the resolution offered by the Politburo of the Communist Party of Vietnam, decided to shut down SBIC from the first quarter of 2024 by actively making SBIC and its 7 subsidiaries bankrupt. Only one subsidiary - which had an effective business and also an important joint venture with Damen - would be left surviving and to be renationalized.
