= Nguyễn Tấn Dũng =

Prime Minister of Vietnam

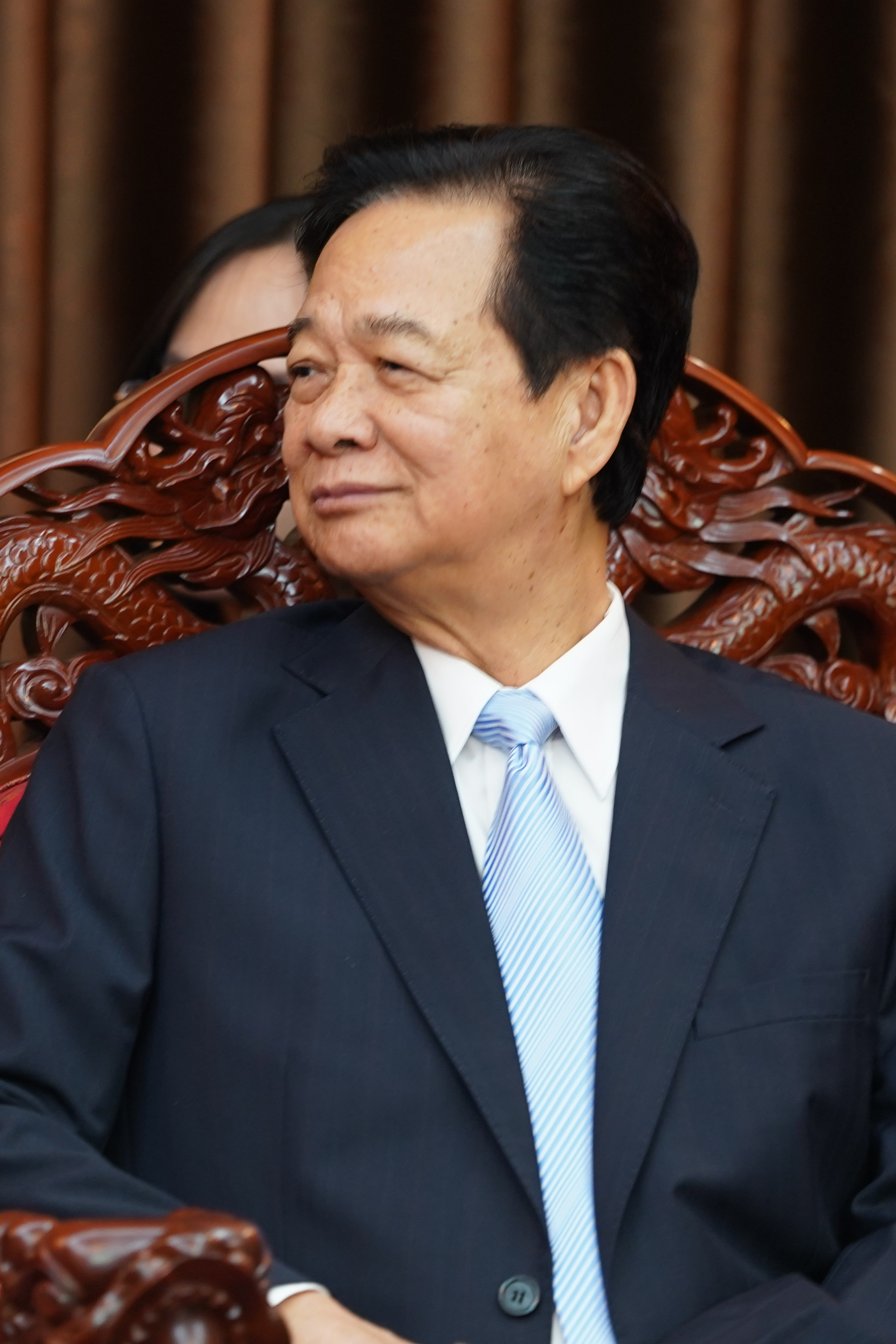
- Dũng in 2026

6th Prime Minister of Vietnam
- In office 27 June 2006 – 7 April 2016
- President: Nguyễn Minh Triết; Trương Tấn Sang; Trần Đại Quang
- Deputy: Nguyễn Sinh Hùng; Nguyễn Xuân Phúc
- Preceded by: Phan Văn Khải
- Succeeded by: Nguyễn Xuân Phúc

Permanent Deputy Prime Minister of Vietnam
- In office 29 September 1997 – 27 June 2006
- Prime Minister: Phan Văn Khải
- Preceded by: Phan Văn Khải
- Succeeded by: Nguyễn Sinh Hùng

Governor of the State Bank
- In office May 1998 – 11 December 1999
- Preceded by: Cao Sĩ Kiêm
- Succeeded by: Lê Đức Thúy

Head of the Party Central Economic Commission
- In office June 1996 – August 1997
- Preceded by: Nguyễn Hà Phan
- Succeeded by: Phan Diễn

Deputy Minister of Public Security
- In office 31 December 1994 – August 1996
- Minister: Bùi Thiện Ngộ

Party Secretary of Kiên Giang
- In office 1991–1995
- Preceded by: Lâm Kiên Trì
- Succeeded by: Lê Hồng Anh

Personal details
- Born: 17 November 1949 (age 76) Cà Mau, State of Vietnam (now Vietnam)
- Party: Communist Party of Vietnam (1967–present)
- Spouse: Trần Thanh Kiệm
- Children: Nguyễn Thanh Nghị (s.1976); Nguyễn Thanh Phượng (s.1980); Nguyễn Minh Triết (s.1988)
- Parents: Nguyễn Tấn Thử (father); Nguyễn Thị Hường (mother)

Military service
- Allegiance: Vietnam
- Branch/service: People's Army
- Years of service: 1961–1984
- Rank: Major
- Battles/wars: Vietnam War

Nguyễn Tấn Dũng (Vietnamese: [ŋwǐənˀ tʌ̌n zǔŋˀ]; born 17 November 1949) is a Vietnamese politician who served as the Prime Minister of Vietnam from 2006 to 2016. He was confirmed by the National Assembly on 27 June 2006, having been nominated by his predecessor, Phan Văn Khải, who retired from office. At a party congress held in January 2011, Nguyễn Tấn Dũng was ranked 3rd in the hierarchy of the Communist Party of Vietnam, after President Trương Tấn Sang. Following the 12th National Congress of the Communist Party of Vietnam, Nguyễn Tấn Dũng was not able to maintain his post in the party and stepped down from his position as Prime Minister on 7 April 2016.

== Early life ==
Nguyễn Tấn Dũng was born on 17 November 1949 in Cà Mau in southern Vietnam. He purportedly volunteered on his 12th birthday to join the Vietcong, doing first-aid, and communication tasks; he also worked as a paramedic, and a physician. He was wounded four times during the Vietnam War, and was later ranked as a level 2/4 wounded veteran. As a Senior Lieutenant he was Chief Political Commissar of Infantry Battalion 207; as a Captain, he was Political Chief of Infantry Regiment 152, defending the southwestern border. As Major, Nguyễn Tấn Dũng headed the Personnel Board of Kien Giang Province's Military Command.

He attended the high-level Nguyen Ai Quoc Party School. He was admitted to the Communist Party of Vietnam on 10 June 1967.

== Military career ==
Nguyễn Tấn Dũng reportedly joined the People's Army of Vietnam in 1961, serving until 1984. He fought in the south and in the west during the Vietnam War. He cited his desire for "national independence" as his reasons for fighting on the battlefield. During this time, Nguyễn Tấn Dũng served in the Cambodian–Vietnamese War, which resulted in the Vietnamese occupation of Cambodia. During his service, he was wounded four times.

== Police career ==
Nguyễn Tấn Dũng was appointed Deputy Minister of Public Security with the rank of Police Major General in January 1995, serving until 1996.

== Political career ==
Nguyễn Tấn Dũng was admitted to the Communist Party of Vietnam on 10 June 1967. He was a protégé of conservative Lê Đức Anh and reformist Võ Văn Kiệt, leaders from both major factions in the party, which enabled him to become the youngest member of the Politburo in 1996. Nguyễn Tấn Dũng previously served as permanent deputy prime minister (first deputy prime minister) from 1997–2006. He was also the governor of the State Bank of Vietnam between 1998 and 1999.

From October 1981 onwards, Nguyễn Tấn Dũng was a member of the Communist Party of Vietnam and was active in political affairs and activities of the Communist Party of Vietnam in the following positions: Kiên Giang Provincial Party Committee, Deputy Chief of Staff Committee Provincial Party Committee; Member of Standing Committee of Kiên Giang Party Committee, Secretary of Hà Tiên District Party Committee; Standing Deputy Secretary and Secretary of Provincial Party Committee; Chairman of the People's Committees; Party Secretary of Kiên Giang Province Military Party Committee; Member of Party Committee of Military Region 9; Representative of the People's Council of Kiên Giang Province.

== Prime Minister (2006–2016) ==
=== First term ===
Nguyễn Tấn Dũng is the first senior Vietnamese communist leader born after the August Revolution in 1945 and the youngest Vietnamese prime minister (57 years old when he assumed the office). He is also a native southerner and remained in the southern region throughout the Vietnam War. One youth asked how he could be Prime Minister someday, to which Nguyễn replied: "Throughout my time following the Party and the Revolution, I always obeyed the assignments of the organization."

It was reported that Vietnam's post-war generation "is increasingly wired, as the Communist Party attempts to foster economic growth and high-tech skills". The government blocks politically oriented sites. There has also been talk of censoring blogs; it was noted that there is a fake Nguyễn Tấn Dũng blog on which the language "mimics official jargon, but is subtly peppered with anti-communist barbs".

=== Second term ===
On 26 July 2011, Nguyễn Tấn Dũng was officially re-elected prime minister by the 13th National Assembly, winning 470 out of 500 votes. He lost out to Trương Tấn Sang in the competition to lead the party's Politburo, or executive committee.

In October 2011, it was reported that political dissidents in Vietnam were "facing a growing crackdown on their activities ... [s]ince the Communist party congress in January, the authorities have steadily ratcheted up the pressure on dissidents". Since 30 July, 15 religious activists had been imprisoned. One lawyer with deep family connections to the Communist party was sentenced to seven years' imprisonment "to the shock and outrage of large sections of the Vietnamese public". A Human Rights Watch report also detailed forced labour and torture throughout the country's drug rehabilitation centres. Australian Vietnam expert Carlyle Thayer said "Nguyễn Tấn Dũng ... is decidedly not a reformer." Although the U.S. and India are developing closer ties to Vietnam, neither "has seen fit to pressure Vietnam on its rights record with any conviction or consistency".

In August 2012, the arrest of Nguyễn Đức Kiên, a local tycoon thought to be close to Nguyễn Tấn Dũng, sparked discussions about Nguyễn Tấn Dũng's ongoing political battle with President Trương Tấn Sang. Following these discussions, much of the anger about nepotism and poor economic management has been directed at Nguyễn Tấn Dũng.

At a Central Committee meeting in October 2012, general secretary Nguyễn Phú Trọng, the head of the Communist Party announced Politburo agreed to propose the committee impose a form of discipline on it and consider discipline on a Politburo member (thought to be Nguyễn Tấn Dũng), but the Central Committee decided to not take any discipline on the Politburo and one of its members – from the prime minister's mistakes in economic management issues, anti-corruption ... Dũng has been 'near-alleged' of "large-scale corruption" surrounding himself and his family. Earlier the Central Committee decided to take the Central Steering Committee for Anti-Corruption away from Nguyễn Tấn Dũng's control, and the committee is now controlled by the Politburo and the general secretary is chief of committee.

On 14 November 2012 Nguyễn Tấn Dũng was told by a National Assembly member, Dương Trung Quốc, to resign for his mistakes in handling the economy. He said that it was time for the prime minister to take responsibility, not just apologise. The attack was unusual because it was made in front of TV cameras in parliament.

=== Foreign relations ===
In 2009, Dũng made a two-day visit to Russia, where he signed a multibillion-dollar arms deal. In 2010, one deputy called for a no confidence motion against Dũng in response to a major management and financial scandal at the state owned Vinashin shipbuilding group. At a party congress in January 2011, he was nominated for another term as prime minister.

On 12 April 2010, Dũng attended a luncheon with U.S. Vice President Joe Biden and other world leaders at the Naval Observatory in Washington, D.C. On the same date he met Obama at the World Security Summit where he "spoke glowingly to American business leaders of Vietnam's economic growth – 7.2% per year over the last decade – and endorsed Obama's concerns about nuclear safety".

In April 2012, Dũng met with Japanese Deputy Prime Minister Okada Katsuya. He expressed his approval with the growing level of cooperation between Vietnam and Japan and they discussed moving forward. They talked about ways accelerate visitation and simplifying both entry procedures and exchange programs. Dũng stated that Vietnam wants to cooperate further and learn from Japan's experience in social insurance and continue to increase Japanese official development assistance.

One of his most remarkable moments was his visit to the Vatican to meet with the Pope, the first time any Vietnamese leader had done so since at least 1975 when Vietnam severed diplomatic ties with the Vatican following the Nation's reunification at the end of the Vietnam War.

== Personal life ==
Nguyễn Tấn Dũng is married to Trần Thanh Kiệm and has three children:

- Nguyễn Thanh Nghị (born 1976) is a George Washington University alumnus. He is currently a member of the 13th Central Committee of the Communist Party of Vietnam, Head of Central Policy, Strategy Commission of the Communist Party of Vietnam, since 2025.
- Nguyễn Thanh Phượng (born 1981) is the founder and Chairwoman of VietCapital Securities and VietCapital Asset Management. Phượng is married to Nguyễn Bảo Hoàng, who held American citizenship. Hoàng is the head of IDG Ventures, a leading tech, retail and media angel fund in Vietnam. He is also the Chairman of the Vietnam Basketball Association, the owner of Saigon Heat and of McDonald's franchises in Vietnam.
- Nguyễn Minh Triết is an officer of the Ho Chi Minh Communist Youth Union. He studied aeronautical engineering at Queen Mary University of London.

== Awards ==
- Gold Star Order (2025)
- Peace, Security and Development Award, December 2015
- Feat Order 3rd class
- Grand Cordon of the Order of the Rising Sun (2025)

Political offices
Preceded by Phan Văn Khải	Prime Minister of Vietnam; 2006–2016	Succeeded by Nguyễn Xuân Phúc
