= 10th Central Committee of the Communist Party of Vietnam =

Central Committee of the Communist Party of Vietnam

10th Central Committee
- Symbol of the Communist Party of Vietnam

25 April 2006 – 19 January 2011 (4 years, 269 days) Overview
- Type: Central Committee of the Communist Party of Vietnam
- Election: 10th National Congress

Leadership
- General Secretary: Nông Đức Mạnh
- Politburo: 14 members
- Secretariat: 8 members

Members
- Total: 161

Alternates
- Total: 21

The 10th Central Committee of the Communist Party of Vietnam was elected at the 10th National Congress of the Communist Party of Vietnam. The 10th Central Committee elected the 10th Politburo and the 10th Secretariat.

== Plenums ==
The Central Committee (CC) is not a permanent institution. Instead, it convenes plenary sessions between party congresses. When the CC is not in session, decision-making powers are delegated to its internal bodies; that is, the Politburo and the Secretariat. None of these organs are permanent bodies either; typically, they convene several times a month.

Plenary Sessions of the 10th Central Committee
Plenum	Date	Length	Ref.
1st Plenary Session	25 April 2006	1 day	
2nd Plenary Session	27–28 May 2006	2 days	
3rd Plenary Session	24–29 July 2006	6 days	
4th Plenary Session	15–24 January 2007	10 days	
5th Plenary Session	5–14 July 2007	10 days	
6th Plenary Session	14–22 January 2008	9 days	
7th Plenary Session	9–17 July 2008	8 days	
8th Plenary Session	2–4 October 2008	10 days	
9th Plenary Session	5–14 January 2009	9 days	
10th Plenary Session	28 June – 4 July 2009	8 days	
11th Plenary Session	5–10 October 2009	6 days	
12th Plenary Session	22–28 March 2010	7 days	
13th Plenary Session	7–14 October 2010	8 days	
14th Plenary Session	13–22 December 2010	10 days	
15th Plenary Session	9 January 2011	1 day	

== Composition ==
=== Members ===
Members of the 10th Central Committee of the Communist Party of Vietnam
Name	9th CC	11th CC	BY	PM	Birthplace	Education	Ethnicity	Gender	Ref.
Hoàng Tuấn Anh	New	Reelected	1952	1984	Đà Nẵng City	Graduate	Kinh	Male	
Lê Hồng Anh	Old	Reelected	1949	1968	Kiên Giang province	Undergraduate	Kinh	Male	
Lê Thị Thu Ba	New	Reelected	1956	—	Hồ Chí Minh City	Undergraduate	Kinh	Female	
Lê Thị Bân	Old	Not	1950	—	Hồ Chí Minh City	—	Kinh	Female	
Huỳnh Văn Be	New	Not	1949	—	Bến Tre province	—	Kinh	Male	
Trịnh Long Biên	Old	Not	1948	—	Bắc Giang province	—	Kinh	Male	
Nguyễn Thái Bình	Old	Reelected	1954	1973	Trà Vinh province	Undergraduate	Kinh	Male	
Trương Hòa Bình	New	Reelected	1955	1973	Long An province	Graduate	Kinh	Male	
Võ Thanh Bình	New	Not	1951	—	Cà Mau province	—	Kinh	Male	
Đào Xuân Cần	New	Not	1951	—	Bắc Giang province	—	Kinh	Male	
Nguyễn Văn Chi	Old	Not	1945	1965	Đà Nẵng City	—	Kinh	Male	
Võ Minh Chiến	New	Reelected	1956	1975	Sóc Trăng province	Undergraduate	Kinh	Male	
Vũ Tiến Chiến	Old	Not	1947	—	Hà Tây province	—	Kinh	Male	
Nguyễn Văn Chiền	Old	Not	1949	1974	Hải Dương province	Undergraduate	Kinh	Male	
Phạm Thị Hải Chuyền	New	Reelected	1952	—	Bắc Giang province	Undergraduate	Kinh	Female	
Hoàng Xuân Cừ	Old	Not	1946	—	Phú Thọ province	—	Kinh	Male	
Trần Thị Cúc	New	Not	1951	—	Hà Bắc province	—	Kinh	Female	
Nguyễn Thành Cung	New	Reelected	1953	—	Tây Ninh province	—	Kinh	Male	
Đinh Văn Cương	New	Reelected	1952	—	Hà Nam province	—	Kinh	Male	
Hà Hùng Cường	New	Reelected	1953	1982	Vĩnh Phúc province	Graduate	Kinh	Male	
Nguyễn Quốc Cường	Old	Reelected	1952	1973	Bắc Giang province	Undergraduate	Kinh	Male	
Huỳnh Đảm	Old	Not	1948	1968	Cà Mau province	Undergraduate	Kinh	Male	
Trần Đình Đàn	New	Not	1951	1969	Hà Tĩnh province	Graduate	Kinh	Male	
Nguyễn Văn Đẳng	Old	Not	1949	—	Bến Tre province	—	Kinh	Male	
Chu Văn Đạt	New	Not	1952	—	Nam Định province	—	Kinh	Male	
Phan Tấn Đạt	Old	Not	1949	—	Bạc Liêu province	—	Kinh	Male	
Nguyễn Thị Doan	Old	Reelected	1951	1981	Hà Nam province	Graduate	Kinh	Female	
Huỳnh Minh Đoàn	New	Not	1953	—	Đồng Tháp province	—	Kinh	Male	
Ngô Văn Dụ	Old	Reelected	1947	1969	Vĩnh Phúc province	Undergraduate	Kinh	Male	
Đào Ngọc Dung	New	Reelected	1962	1984	Hà Nam province	Graduate	Kinh	Male	
Bùi Tiến Dũng	New	Not	1951	—	Thái Bình province	—	Kinh	Male	
Hồ Nghĩa Dũng	Old	Not	1950	1978	Đà Nẵng City	—	Kinh	Male	
Lê Văn Dũng	Old	Not	1945	1965	Bến Tre province	Undergraduate	Kinh	Male	
Nguyễn Tấn Dũng	Old	Reelected	1949	1967	Cà Mau province	Undergraduate	Kinh	Male	
Trịnh Đình Dũng	New	Reelected	1956	—	Vĩnh Phúc province	—	Kinh	Male	
Nguyễn Văn Được	Old	Not	1946	—	Quảng Ngãi province	—	Kinh	Male	
Mai Thế Dương	Old	Reelected	1954	—	Vĩnh Phúc province	Undergraduate	Tày	Male	
Nguyễn Văn Giàu	New	Reelected	1957	1981	An Giang province	Graduate	Kinh	Male	
Vũ Hoàng Hà	New	Not	1951	1974	Bình Định province	—	Kinh	Male	
Hoàng Trung Hải	Old	Reelected	1959	1990	Thái Bình province	Graduate	Kinh	Male	
Lê Thanh Hải	Old	Reelected	1950	1968	Tiền Giang province	Undergraduate	Kinh	Male	
Trần Lưu Hải	New	Reelected	1953	—	Phú Thọ province	—	Kinh	Male	
Trần Văn Hằng	New	Reelected	1953	1981	Nghệ An province	Graduate	Kinh	Male	
Nguyễn Đức Hạt	Old	Not	1945	—	Quảng Nam province	—	Kinh	Male	
Nguyễn Văn Hiến	Old	Not	1954	1976	Ninh Bình province	—	Kinh	Male	
Vũ Văn Hiến	Old	Not	1947	1981	Hưng Yên province	Undergraduate	Kinh	Male	
Hà Văn Hiền	Old	Not	1948	1975	Hải Dương province	—	Kinh	Male	
Vũ Văn Hiền	Old	Not	1950	1972	Hải Dương province	Graduate	Kinh	Male	
Phùng Quốc Hiển	New	Reelected	1958	1986	Phú Thọ province	Graduate	Kinh	Male	
Nguyễn Văn Hiện	New	Not	1954	1985	Thái Bình province	Graduate	Kinh	Male	
Đặng Văn Hiếu	New	Reelected	1953	1978	Ninh Bình province	—	Kinh	Male	
Nguyễn Huy Hiệu	Old	Not	1947	—	Nam Định province	—	Kinh	Male	
Nguyễn Thị Thanh Hòa	New	Reelected	1954	1987	Bắc Ninh province	Graduate	Kinh	Female	
Phương Minh Hòa	New	Reelected	1955	—	Hà Nội City	—	Kinh	Male	
Vũ Huy Hoàng	New	Reelected	1953	1981	Hải Phòng City	Graduate	Kinh	Male	
Vũ Ngọc Hoàng	New	Reelected	1953	—	Quảng Nam province	—	Kinh	Male	
Lê Doãn Hợp	Old	Not	1951	1970	Nghệ An province	Graduate	Kinh	Male	
Bùi Văn Huấn	Old	Not	1945	—	Đồng Tháp province	—	Kinh	Male	
Vương Đình Huệ	New	Reelected	1957	1984	Nghệ An province	Graduate	Kinh	Male	
Đinh Văn Hùng	New	Not	1953	—	Ninh Bình province	—	Kinh	Male	
Nguyễn Sinh Hùng	Old	Reelected	1946	1977	Nghệ An province	Graduate	Kinh	Male	
Phạm Xuân Hùng	New	Reelected	1953	—	Nam Định province	—	Kinh	Male	
Nguyễn Tấn Hưng	New	Reelected	1955	—	Bình Phước province	Undergraduate	Kinh	Male	
Nguyễn Văn Hưởng	Old	Not	1946	—	Quảng Ninh province	—	Kinh	Male	
Võ Đức Huy	Old	Not	1950	—	Quảng Ngãi province	—	Kinh	Male	
Đinh Thế Huynh	Old	Reelected	1953	1974	Nam Định province	Graduate	Kinh	Male	
Nguyễn Tuấn Khanh	Old	Reelected	1954	1984	An Giang province	Undergraduate	Kinh	Male	
Trương Quang Khánh	New	Reelected	1953	1976	Quảng Nam province	Graduate	Kinh	Male	
Phạm Gia Khiêm	Old	Not	1944	1978	Hà Nội City	Graduate	Kinh	Male	
Hà Thị Khiết	Old	Reelected	1950	1969	Tuyên Quang province	Undergraduate	Tày	Female	
Nguyễn Đức Kiên	Old	Not	1948	1968	Hải Dương province	Undergraduate	Kinh	Male	
Phan Trung Kiên	Old	Not	1946	—	Hồ Chí Minh City	—	Kinh	Male	
Vũ Trọng Kim	Old	Reelected	1953	—	Quảng Nam province	Undergraduate	Kinh	Male	
Ngô Xuân Lịch	New	Reelected	1954	1973	Hà Nam province	Graduate	Kinh	Male	
Đào Tấn Lộc	New	Reelected	1953	1981	Phú Yên province	Undergraduate	Kinh	Male	
Nguyễn Văn Lợi	New	Not	1961	1981	Hồ Chí Minh City	Graduate	Kinh	Male	
Uông Chu Lưu	Old	Reelected	1955	1983	Hà Tĩnh province	Graduate	Kinh	Male	
Trương Thị Mai	New	Reelected	1958	1985	Quảng Bình province	Graduate	Kinh	Female	
Hồ Xuân Mãn	Old	Not	1949	—	Thừa Thiên Huế province	—	Kinh	Male	
Vi Văn Mạn	New	Not	1949	—	Lạng Sơn province	—	Kinh	Male	
Nông Đức Mạnh	Old	Not	1940	1963	Bắc Kạn Province	Graduate	Tày	Male	
Đặng Vũ Minh	Old	Not	1946	—	Nam Định province	—	Kinh	Male	
Nguyễn Tuấn Minh	Old	Reelected	1953	—	Bà Rịa–Vũng Tàu province	Graduate	Kinh	Male	
Phạm Bình Minh	New	Reelected	1959	1984	Nam Định province	Graduate	Kinh	Male	
Đỗ Hoài Nam	Old	Not	1949	—	Bắc Ninh province	—	Kinh	Male	
Mai Văn Năm	Old	Not	1948	—	Đà Nẵng City	—	Kinh	Male	
Nguyễn Thị Kim Ngân	Old	Reelected	1954	1981	Bến Tre province	Graduate	Kinh	Female	
Phạm Quang Nghị	Old	Reelected	1949	1973	Thanh Hóa province	Graduate	Kinh	Male	
Lê Hữu Nghĩa	Old	Not	1947	—	Quảng Ngãi province	—	Kinh	Male	
Nguyễn Khắc Nghiên	Old	Not	1951	1972	Phú Thọ province	Graduate	Kinh	Male	
Phạm Khôi Nguyên	New	Not	1950	1982	Hà Tây province	Graduate	Kinh	Male	
Huỳnh Thị Nhân	New	Not	1952	—	Hồ Chí Minh City	—	Kinh	Female	
Nguyễn Thiện Nhân	New	Reelected	1953	1980	Trà Vinh province	Graduate	Kinh	Male	
Hoàng Minh Nhất	New	Not	1952	1976	Hà Giang province	Undergraduate	Tày	Male	
Hà Sơn Nhin	New	Reelected	1954	1971	Gia Lai province	Graduate	Bahnar	Male	
Vũ Văn Ninh	New	Reelected	1955	1987	Nam Định province	Graduate	Kinh	Male	
Nguyễn Thị Nương	New	Reelected	1955	1985	Cao Bằng province	Graduate	Tày	Female	
Nguyễn Đình Phách	New	Reelected	1954	1974	Hưng Yên province	Undergraduate	Kinh	Male	
Mai Quang Phấn	New	Reelected	1953	—	Thanh Hóa province	—	Kinh	Male	
Cao Đức Phát	New	Reelected	1956	—	Nam Định province	Graduate	Kinh	Male	
Hoàng Văn Phong	Old	Not	1948	—	Hà Nội City	—	Kinh	Male	
Tòng Thị Phóng	Old	Reelected	1954	1981	Sơn La province	Graduate	Thái	Female	
Phùng Hữu Phú	Old	Not	1948	—	Nam Định province	—	Kinh	Male	
Giàng Seo Phử	Old	Reelected	1951	1978	Lào Cai province	Undergraduate	Kinh	Male	
Lê Hữu Phúc	New	Reelected	1954	—	Quảng Trị province	—	Kinh	Male	
Nguyễn Xuân Phúc	New	Reelected	1954	1982	Quảng Nam province	Undergraduate	Kinh	Male	
Võ Hồng Phúc	Old	Not	1945	1976	Hà Tĩnh province	—	Kinh	Male	
Ksor Phước	Old	Reelected	1954	—	Gia Lai province	Undergraduate	Kinh	Male	
Hoàng Bình Quân	Old	Reelected	1959	1984	Thái Bình province	Undergraduate	Kinh	Male	
Lê Hoàng Quân	Old	Reelected	1953	—	Bình Dương province	Undergraduate	Kinh	Male	
Nguyễn Hồng Quân	Old	Not	1949	1982	Hải Dương province	Graduate	Kinh	Male	
Nguyễn Việt Quân	New	Not	1951	—	Cần Thơ City	—	Kinh	Male	
Nguyễn Minh Quang	New	Reelected	1953	—	Hà Tĩnh province	—	Kinh	Male	
Nguyễn Phong Quang	New	Not	1949	—	Trà Vinh province	—	Kinh	Male	
Trần Đại Quang	New	Reelected	1956	1980	Ninh Bình province	Graduate	Kinh	Male	
Nguyễn Tấn Quyên	Old	Reelected	1953	1969	Trà Vinh province	Undergraduate	Kinh	Male	
Bùi Thanh Quyến	New	Reelected	1956	1975	Hải Dương province	Graduate	Kinh	Male	
Nguyễn Văn Quynh	New	Reelected	1953	1979	Hải Phòng City	Undergraduate	Kinh	Male	
Tô Huy Rứa	Old	Reelected	1947	1967	Thanh Hóa province	Graduate	Kinh	Male	
Trương Tấn Sang	Old	Reelected	1949	1969	Long An province	Undergraduate	Kinh	Male	
Trương Văn Sáu	New	Not	1950	—	Vĩnh Long province	Undergraduate	Kinh	Male	
Nguyễn Bắc Son	New	Not	1953	1973	Hà Nội City	Graduate	Kinh	Male	
Nguyễn Văn Son	Old	Not	1946	1966	Hưng Yên province	Undergraduate	Kinh	Male	
Huỳnh Ngọc Sơn	New	Reelected	1951	1971	Đà Nẵng City	Undergraduate	Kinh	Male	
Sơn Song Sơn	Old	Not	1946	—	Trà Vinh province	Undergraduate	Khmer	Male	
Thào Xuân Sùng	New	Reelected	1958	1984	Sơn La province	Undergraduate	Hmong	Male	
Tạ Ngọc Tấn	New	Reelected	1954	1974	Phú Thọ province	Graduate	Kinh	Male	
Nguyễn Bá Thanh	New	Reelected	1953	1980	Đà Nẵng City	Graduate	Kinh	Male	
Phùng Quang Thanh	Old	Reelected	1949	1968	Hà Nội City	Graduate	Kinh	Male	
Trần Đình Thành	New	Reelected	1955	—	Bà Rịa–Vũng Tàu province	Graduate	Kinh	Male	
Nguyễn Thế Thảo	Old	Reelected	1952	1980	Bắc Ninh province	Graduate	Kinh	Male	
Đào Trọng Thi	Old	Reelected	1951	—	Hải Phòng City	—	Kinh	Male	
Phạm Văn Thọ	Old	Not	1945	—	Hải Dương province	—	Kinh	Male	
Nguyễn Văn Thuận	New	Not	1952	—	Hải Phòng City	Graduate	Kinh	Male	
Niê Thuật	Old	Reelected	1956	1981	Đắk Lắk province	—	Êđê	Male	
Lê Đức Thúy	Old	Not	1948	—	Hà Tĩnh province	—	Kinh	Male	
Lê Thế Tiệm	Old	Not	1949	—	Quảng Nam province	—	Kinh	Male	
Trương Văn Tiếp	New	Not	1951	—	Long An province	—	Kinh	Male	
Nguyễn Khánh Toàn	Old	Not	1945	—	Quảng Trị province	—	Kinh	Male	
Huỳnh Phong Tranh	New	Reelected	1955	—	Hậu Giang province	—	Kinh	Male	
Nguyễn Minh Triết	Old	Not	1942	1965	Bình Dương province	Undergraduate	Kinh	Male	
Nguyễn Quốc Triệu	New	Not	1951	1972	Bắc Ninh province	—	Kinh	Male	
Nguyễn Phú Trọng	Old	Reelected	1944	1968	Hà Nội City	Graduate	Kinh	Male	
Trương Vĩnh Trọng	Old	Not	1942	—	Bến Tre province	Graduate	Kinh	Male	
Mai Thế Trung	Old	Reelected	1954	1974	Bình Dương province	Undergraduate	Kinh	Male	
Nguyễn Thế Trung	New	Reelected	1953	—	Nghệ An province	—	Kinh	Male	
Trần Văn Truyền	Old	Not	1950	1968	Bến Tre province	Undergraduate	Kinh	Male	
Nguyễn Văn Tự	Old	Not	1949	—	Khánh Hòa province	—	Kinh	Male	
Trần Văn Tuấn	Old	Not	1950	1974	Hải Dương province	Graduate	Kinh	Male	
Trương Quốc Tuấn	New	Not	1953	—	Bạc Liêu province	Undergraduate	Kinh	Male	
Đặng Ngọc Tùng	New	Reelected	1952	—	Quảng Ngãi province	—	Kinh	Male	
Phạm Minh Tuyên	Old	Not	1949	1968	Ninh Bình province	Graduate	Kinh	Male	
Huỳnh Văn Tý	New	Not	1956	—	Bình Thuận province	—	Kinh	Male	
Đỗ Bá Tỵ	New	Reelected	1954	1974	Hà Nội City	—	Kinh	Male	
Y Vêng	Old	Not	1950	1968	Kon Tum province	—	Xê-đăng	Female	
Hồ Đức Việt	Old	Not	1947	1967	Nghệ An province	Graduate	Kinh	Male	
Nguyễn Hoàng Việt	New	Reelected	1966	2001	Đồng Tháp province	—	Kinh	Male	
Bùi Quang Vinh	New	Reelected	1953	—	Hà Tây province	—	Kinh	Male	
Ngô Đức Vượng	New	Not	1949	—	Phú Thọ province	—	Kinh	Male	
Trần Quốc Vượng	New	Reelected	1953	1979	Thái Bình province	Graduate	Kinh	Male	

=== Alternates ===
Alternates of the 10th Central Committee of the Communist Party of Vietnam
Name	9th CC	11th CC	BY	PM	Birthplace	Education	Ethnicity	Gender	Ref.
Phan Thanh Bình	New	Member	1960	1984	An Giang province	Graduate	Kinh	Male	
Đỗ Văn Chiến	New	Member	1962	1986	Tuyên Quang province	Graduate	Sán Dìu	Male	
Mai Văn Chính	New	Member	1961	1987	Long An province	Graduate	Kinh	Male	
Phạm Biên Cương	New	Not	1960	1985	An Giang province	Undergraduate	Kinh	Male	
Vũ Đức Đam	New	Member	1963	1993	Hải Dương province	Graduate	Kinh	Male	
Phan Xuân Dũng	New	Member	1960	1989	Hà Tĩnh province	Graduate	Kinh	Male	
Võ Văn Dũng	New	Member	1960	1982	Bạc Liêu province	Undergraduate	Kinh	Male	
Bùi Thị Minh Hoài	New	Member	1965	1991	Hà Nam province	Graduate	Kinh	Female	
Điểu K'Ré	New	Alternate	1968	1993	Đắk Nông province	Graduate	Mnong	Male	
Hầu A Lềnh	New	Member	1973	1994	Lào Cai province	Graduate	Hmong	Male	
Nguyễn Hồng Lĩnh	New	Member	1964	1986	Long An province	Undergraduate	Kinh	Male	
Trần Thanh Mẫn	New	Member	1962	1982	Hậu Giang province	Graduate	Kinh	Male	
Võ Văn Phuông	New	Member	1960	—	Tây Ninh province	Graduate	Kinh	Male	
Nguyễn Xuân Quang	New	Not	1961	—	Quảng Bình province	—	Kinh	Male	
Nguyễn Thanh Sơn	New	Member	1960	—	Rạch Giá province	Graduate	Kinh	Male	
Đặng Thị Ngọc Thịnh	New	Member	1959	1979	Bình Định province	Graduate	Kinh	Female	
Võ Văn Thưởng	New	Member	1970	1993	Vĩnh Long province	Graduate	Kinh	Male	
Nguyễn Thị Kim Tiến	New	Member	1959	1995	Hà Tĩnh province	Graduate	Kinh	Female	
Trần Cẩm Tú	New	Member	1961	1990	Hà Tĩnh province	Graduate	Kinh	Male	
Triệu Tài Vinh	New	Member	1968	1998	Hà Giang province	Graduate	Dao	Male	
