= 11th Central Committee of the Communist Party of Vietnam =

Central Committee of the Communist Party of Vietnam

11th Central Committee
- Symbol of the Communist Party of Vietnam

19 January 2011 – 27 January 2016 (5 years, 8 days) Overview
- Type: Central Committee of the Communist Party of Vietnam
- Election: 11th National Congress

Leadership
- General Secretary: Nguyễn Phú Trọng
- Politburo: 14 members
- Secretariat: 11 members

Members
- Total: 175
- Newcomers: 74 members (11th)
- Old: 84 members 15 alternates (10th)
- Reelected: 81 members (12th)

Alternates
- Total: 25 alternates
- Newcomers: 24 alternates (11th)
- Old: 1 alternate (10th)
- Reelected: 19 to member-status 3 to alternate-status (12th)

The 11th Central Committee of the Communist Party of Vietnam (Vietnamese: Ban Chấp hành Trung ương Đảng Cộng sản Việt Nam khóa XI) was elected at the 11th National Congress of the Communist Party of Vietnam. The 11th Central Committee elected the 11th Politburo and the 11th Secretariat.

== Plenums ==
The Central Committee is not a permanent institution. Instead, it convenes plenary sessions between party congresses. When the CC is not in session, decision-making powers are delegated to the internal bodies of the CC itself; that is, the Politburo and the Secretariat. None of these organs are permanent bodies either; typically, they convene several times a month.

Plenary Sessions of the 11th Central Committee
Plenum	Date	Length	Ref.
1st Plenary Session	18 January 2011	1 day	
2nd Plenary Session	4–10 July 2011	7 days	
3rd Plenary Session	6–11 October 2011	6 days	
4th Plenary Session	26–30 December 2011	5 days	
5th Plenary Session	7–15 May 2012	9 days	
6th Plenary Session	1–15 October 2012	16 days	
7th Plenary Session	2–12 May 2013	11 days	
8th Plenary Session	1–10 October 2013	10 days	
9th Plenary Session	8–14 May 2014	7 days	
10th Plenary Session	4–12 January 2015	9 days	
11th Plenary Session	4–7 May 2015	4 days	
12th Plenary Session	5–11 October 2015	7 days	
13th Plenary Session	14–21 December 2015	8 days	
14th Plenary Session	11–13 January 2016	3 days	

== Composition ==
=== Members ===
Members of the 11th Central Committee of the Communist Party of Vietnam
Name	10th CC	12th CC	Birth	PM	Education	Ethnicity	Gender	Ref.
Hoàng Tuấn Anh	Old	Not	1952	1984	Graduate	Kinh	Male	
Lê Hồng Anh	Old	Not	1949	1968	Undergraduate	Kinh	Male	
Lê Thị Thu Ba	Old	Not	1956	—	Undergraduate	Kinh	Female	
Hà Ban	New	Reelected	1957	—	Graduate	Kinh	Male	
Bùi Quang Bền	New	Not	1955	1981	Undergraduate	Kinh	Male	
Lương Ngọc Bính	New	Not	1955	1988	Undergraduate	Kinh	Male	
Dương Thanh Bình	New	Reelected	1961	1981	Undergraduate	Kinh	Male	
Nguyễn Hòa Bình	New	Reelected	1958	1981	Graduate	Kinh	Male	
Nguyễn Thái Bình	Old	Not	1954	1973	Undergraduate	Kinh	Male	
Nguyễn Thanh Bình	New	Reelected	1957	—	Undergraduate	Kinh	Male	
Nguyễn Văn Bình	New	Reelected	1961	1995	Graduate	Kinh	Male	
Phan Thanh Bình	Alternate	Reelected	1960	1984	Graduate	Kinh	Male	
Trương Hòa Bình	Old	Reelected	1955	1973	Graduate	Kinh	Male	
Huỳnh Minh Chắc	New	Not	1955	1974	—	Kinh	Male	
Lê Chiêm	New	Reelected	1958	1980	Graduate	Kinh	Male	
Đỗ Văn Chiến	Alternate	Reelected	1962	1986	Graduate	Sán Dìu	Male	
Hà Ngọc Chiến	New	Reelected	1957	1980	Graduate	Tày	Male	
Võ Minh Chiến	Old	Not	1956	1975	Undergraduate	Kinh	Male	
Mai Văn Chính	Alternate	Reelected	1961	1987	Graduate	Kinh	Male	
Phạm Minh Chính	New	Reelected	1958	1986	Graduate	Kinh	Male	
Phạm Thị Hải Chuyền	Old	Not	1952	—	Undergraduate	Kinh	Female	
Nguyễn Thành Cung	Old	Not	1953	—	—	Kinh	Male	
Đinh Văn Cương	Old	Not	1952	—	—	Kinh	Male	
Hà Hùng Cường	Old	Not	1953	1982	Graduate	Kinh	Male	
Lương Cường	New	Reelected	1957	1978	Undergraduate	Kinh	Male	
Nguyễn Quốc Cường	Old	Not	1952	1973	Undergraduate	Kinh	Male	
Nguyễn Xuân Cường	New	Reelected	1959	1986	Undergraduate	Kinh	Male	
Vũ Đức Đam	Alternate	Reelected	1963	1993	Graduate	Kinh	Male	
Nguyễn Thị Doan	Old	Not	1951	1981	Graduate	Kinh	Female	
Trần Đơn	New	Reelected	1958	—	—	Kinh	Male	
Ngô Văn Dụ	Old	Not	1947	1969	Undergraduate	Kinh	Male	
Lê Hữu Đức	New	Not	1955	1980	Graduate	Kinh	Male	
Đào Ngọc Dung	Old	Reelected	1962	1984	Graduate	Kinh	Male	
Đinh Tiến Dũng	New	Reelected	1961	1987	Graduate	Kinh	Male	
Mai Tiến Dũng	New	Reelected	1959	1980	Graduate	Kinh	Male	
Nguyễn Chí Dũng	New	Reelected	1960	1987	Graduate	Kinh	Male	
Nguyễn Tấn Dũng	Old	Not	1949	1967	Undergraduate	Kinh	Male	
Phan Xuân Dũng	Alternate	Reelected	1960	1989	Graduate	Kinh	Male	
Trần Trí Dũng	New	Reelected	1959	1980	Undergraduate	Kinh	Male	
Trịnh Đình Dũng	Old	Reelected	1956	—	—	Kinh	Male	
Võ Văn Dũng	Alternate	Reelected	1960	1982	Undergraduate	Kinh	Male	
Mai Thế Dương	Old	Not	1954	—	Undergraduate	Tày	Male	
Phạm Xuân Đương	New	Not	1956	1984	Graduate	Kinh	Male	
Lò Văn Giàng	New	Not	1956	—	—	Kinh	Male	
Nguyễn Văn Giàu	Old	Reelected	1957	1981	Graduate	Kinh	Male	
Nguyễn Thị Thu Hà	New	Reelected	1970	1997	Graduate	Kinh	Female	
Phạm Hồng Hà	New	Reelected	1958	1989	Graduate	Kinh	Male	
Hoàng Trung Hải	Old	Reelected	1959	1990	Graduate	Kinh	Male	
Lê Thanh Hải	Old	Not	1950	1968	Undergraduate	Kinh	Male	
Nguyễn Đức Hải	New	Not	1961	1984	Graduate	Kinh	Male	
Trần Lưu Hải	Old	Not	1953	—	—	Kinh	Male	
Trần Văn Hằng	Old	Not	1953	1981	Graduate	Kinh	Male	
Nguyễn Văn Hiến	New	Not	1962	1988	Undergraduate	Kinh	Male	
Phùng Quốc Hiển	Old	Reelected	1958	1986	Graduate	Kinh	Male	
Đặng Văn Hiếu	Old	Not	1953	1978	—	Kinh	Male	
Dương Đức Hòa	New	Not	1955	—	—	Kinh	Male	
Nguyễn Thị Thanh Hòa	Old	Not	1954	1987	Graduate	Kinh	Female	
Phương Minh Hòa	Old	Not	1955	—	—	Kinh	Male	
Bùi Thị Minh Hoài	Alternate	Reelected	1965	1991	Graduate	Kinh	Female	
Vũ Huy Hoàng	Old	Not	1953	1981	Graduate	Kinh	Male	
Vũ Ngọc Hoàng	Old	Not	1953	—	—	Kinh	Male	
Vương Đình Huệ	Old	Reelected	1957	1984	Graduate	Kinh	Male	
Nguyễn Sinh Hùng	Old	Not	1946	1977	Graduate	Kinh	Male	
Phạm Xuân Hùng	Old	Not	1953	—	—	Kinh	Male	
Nguyễn Tấn Hưng	Old	Not	1955	—	Undergraduate	Kinh	Male	
Thuận Hữu	New	Reelected	1958	1985	Graduate	Kinh	Male	
Trần Quốc Huy	New	Not	1955	—	—	Kinh	Male	
Đinh Thế Huynh	Old	Reelected	1953	1974	Graduate	Kinh	Male	
Nguyễn Tuấn Khanh	Old	Not	1954	1984	Undergraduate	Kinh	Male	
Nguyễn Doãn Khánh	New	Not	1953	1982	Graduate	Kinh	Male	
Trương Quang Khánh	Old	Not	1953	1976	Graduate	Kinh	Male	
Hà Thị Khiết	Old	Not	1950	1969	Undergraduate	Tày	Female	
Phùng Thanh Kiểm	New	Not	1958	1982	Undergraduate	Nùng	Male	
Vũ Trọng Kim	Old	Not	1953	—	Undergraduate	Kinh	Male	
Tô Lâm	New	Reelected	1957	1981	Graduate	Kinh	Male	
Ngô Xuân Lịch	Old	Reelected	1954	1973	Graduate	Kinh	Male	
Đào Tấn Lộc	Old	Not	1953	1981	Undergraduate	Kinh	Male	
Phạm Vũ Luận	New	Not	1955	1987	Graduate	Kinh	Male	
Uông Chu Lưu	Old	Reelected	1955	1983	Graduate	Kinh	Male	
Trương Thị Mai	Old	Reelected	1958	1985	Graduate	Kinh	Female	
Trần Thanh Mẫn	Alternate	Reelected	1962	1982	Graduate	Kinh	Male	
Châu Văn Minh	New	Reelected	1961	1996	Graduate	Kinh	Male	
Nguyễn Tuấn Minh	Old	Not	1953	—	Graduate	Kinh	Male	
Phạm Bình Minh	Old	Reelected	1959	1984	Graduate	Kinh	Male	
Trần Bình Minh	New	Reelected	1958	1992	Graduate	Kinh	Male	
Trần Văn Minh	New	Not	1961	1990	Graduate	Kinh	Male	
Bùi Văn Nam	New	Reelected	1955	—	Undergraduate	Kinh	Male	
Nguyễn Phương Nam	New	Reelected	1957	—	Undergraduate	Kinh	Male	
Nguyễn Văn Nên	New	Reelected	1957	1978	Undergraduate	Kinh	Male	
Nguyễn Thị Kim Ngân	Old	Reelected	1954	1981	Graduate	Kinh	Female	
Phạm Quang Nghị	Old	Not	1949	1973	Graduate	Kinh	Male	
Trương Quang Nghĩa	New	Reelected	1958	1983	Graduate	Kinh	Male	
Phạm Quý Ngọ	New	Not	1954	—	Undergraduate	Kinh	Male	
Hồ Mẫu Ngoạt	New	Not	1956	—	—	Kinh	Male	
Trần Thế Ngọc	New	Not	1955	—	—	Kinh	Male	
Nguyễn Thiện Nhân	Old	Reelected	1953	1980	Graduate	Kinh	Male	
Hà Sơn Nhin	Old	Not	1954	1971	Graduate	Bahnar	Male	
Mai Văn Ninh	New	Not	1957	—	—	Kinh	Male	
Vũ Văn Ninh	Old	Not	1955	1987	Graduate	Kinh	Male	
Nguyễn Thị Nương	Old	Not	1955	1985	Graduate	Tày	Female	
Nguyễn Đình Phách	Old	Not	1954	1974	Undergraduate	Kinh	Male	
Mai Quang Phấn	Old	Not	1953	—	—	Kinh	Male	
Cao Đức Phát	Old	Reelected	1956	—	Graduate	Kinh	Male	
Nguyễn Thành Phong	New	Reelected	1962	1988	Graduate	Kinh	Male	
Tòng Thị Phóng	Old	Reelected	1954	1981	Graduate	Thái	Female	
Giàng Seo Phử	Old	Not	1951	1978	Undergraduate	Kinh	Male	
Lê Hữu Phúc	Old	Not	1954	—	—	Kinh	Male	
Nguyễn Hạnh Phúc	New	Reelected	1959	1986	Undergraduate	Kinh	Male	
Nguyễn Xuân Phúc	Old	Reelected	1954	1982	Undergraduate	Kinh	Male	
Ksor Phước	Old	Not	1954	—	Undergraduate	Kinh	Male	
Võ Văn Phuông	Alternate	Reelected	1960	—	Graduate	Kinh	Male	
Hoàng Bình Quân	Old	Reelected	1959	1984	Undergraduate	Kinh	Male	
Lê Hoàng Quân	Old	Not	1953	—	Undergraduate	Kinh	Male	
Nguyễn Quân	New	Not	1955	—	—	Kinh	Male	
Lê Thanh Quang	New	Reelected	1960	—	Undergraduate	Kinh	Male	
Nguyễn Minh Quang	Old	Not	1953	—	—	Kinh	Male	
Trần Đại Quang	Old	Reelected	1956	1980	Graduate	Kinh	Male	
Nguyễn Tấn Quyên	Old	Not	1953	1969	Undergraduate	Kinh	Male	
Bùi Thanh Quyến	Old	Not	1956	1975	Graduate	Kinh	Male	
Nguyễn Văn Quynh	Old	Not	1953	1979	Undergraduate	Kinh	Male	
Tô Huy Rứa	Old	Not	1947	1967	Graduate	Kinh	Male	
Trương Tấn Sang	Old	Not	1949	1969	Undergraduate	Kinh	Male	
Phan Văn Sáu	New	Reelected	1956	1986	Undergraduate	Kinh	Male	
Hồ Xuân Sơn	New	Not	1956	—	—	Kinh	Male	
Huỳnh Ngọc Sơn	Old	Not	1951	1971	Undergraduate	Kinh	Male	
Nguyễn Thanh Sơn	Alternate	Reelected	1960	—	Graduate	Kinh	Male	
Thào Xuân Sùng	Old	Reelected	1958	1984	Undergraduate	Hmong	Male	
Lê Vĩnh Tân	New	Reelected	1958	1980	Undergraduate	Kinh	Male	
Tạ Ngọc Tấn	Old	Not	1954	1974	Graduate	Kinh	Male	
Nguyễn Xuân Thắng	New	Reelected	1957	1983	Graduate	Kinh	Male	
Sơn Minh Thắng	New	Reelected	1960	—	—	Khmer	Male	
Ngô Thị Doãn Thanh	New	Not	1957	1983	Graduate	Kinh	Female	
Nguyễn Bá Thanh	Old	Not	1953	1980	Graduate	Kinh	Male	
Phùng Quang Thanh	Old	Not	1949	1968	Graduate	Kinh	Male	
Nguyễn Văn Thành	New	Reelected	1957	1982	Graduate	Kinh	Male	
Trần Đình Thành	Old	Not	1955	—	Graduate	Kinh	Male	
Nguyễn Thế Thảo	Old	Not	1952	1980	Graduate	Kinh	Male	
Đào Trọng Thi	Old	Not	1951	—	—	Kinh	Male	
Nguyễn Ngọc Thiện	New	Reelected	1959	1985	Graduate	Kinh	Male	
Nguyễn Văn Thiện	New	Not	1954	—	—	Kinh	Male	
Đặng Thị Ngọc Thịnh	Alternate	Reelected	1959	1979	Graduate	Kinh	Female	
Nguyễn Văn Thông	New	Not	1956	—	—	Kinh	Male	
Niê Thuật	Old	Not	1956	1981	—	Êđê	Male	
Võ Văn Thưởng	Alternate	Reelected	1970	1993	Graduate	Kinh	Male	
Huỳnh Văn Tí	New	Not	1956	1979	Undergraduate	Kinh	Male	
Nguyễn Thị Kim Tiến	Alternate	Not	1959	1995	Graduate	Kinh	Female	
Nguyễn Xuân Tiến	New	Reelected	1958	—	Undergraduate	Kinh	Male	
Bùi Văn Tỉnh	New	Reelected	1958	1988	Undergraduate	Kinh	Male	
Phan Đình Trạc	New	Reelected	1958	1980	Undergraduate	Kinh	Male	
Huỳnh Phong Tranh	Old	Not	1955	—	—	Kinh	Male	
Lò Mai Trinh	New	Not	1957	—	—	Kinh	Female	
Nguyễn Phú Trọng	Old	Reelected	1944	1968	Graduate	Kinh	Male	
Mai Trực	New	Reelected	1957	1979	Undergraduate	Kinh	Male	
Đào Việt Trung	New	Reelected	1959	1983	Undergraduate	Kinh	Male	
Mai Thế Trung	Old	Not	1954	1974	Undergraduate	Kinh	Male	
Nguyễn Thế Trung	Old	Not	1953	—	—	Kinh	Male	
Võ Tiến Trung	New	Not	1954	1977	Graduate	Kinh	Male	
Bế Xuân Trường	New	Reelected	1957	1979	—	Kinh	Male	
Trần Cẩm Tú	Alternate	Reelected	1961	1990	Graduate	Kinh	Male	
Nông Quốc Tuấn	New	Not	1963	1992	Undergraduate	Tày	Male	
Đặng Ngọc Tùng	Old	Not	1952	—	—	Kinh	Male	
Trần Văn Túy	New	Reelected	1957	1983	Graduate	Kinh	Male	
Đỗ Bá Tỵ	Old	Reelected	1954	1974	—	Kinh	Male	
Nguyễn Hữu Vạn	New	Not	1956	—	—	Kinh	Male	
Nguyễn Sáng Vang	New	Not	1957	1986	Graduate	Tày	Male	
Nguyễn Hoàng Việt	Old	Not	1966	2001	—	Kinh	Male	
Võ Trọng Việt	New	Reelected	1957	1977	—	Kinh	Male	
Bùi Quang Vinh	Old	Not	1953	—	—	Kinh	Male	
Triệu Tài Vinh	Alternate	Reelected	1968	1998	Graduate	Dao	Male	
Nguyễn Chí Vịnh	New	Reelected	1957	—	Graduate	Kinh	Male	
Phạm Văn Vọng	New	Not	1957	—	—	Kinh	Male	
Lê Quý Vương	New	Reelected	1956	1981	Graduate	Kinh	Male	
Trần Quốc Vượng	Old	Reelected	1953	1979	Graduate	Kinh	Male	

=== Alternates ===
Alternates of the 11th Central Committee of the Communist Party of Vietnam
Name	10th CC	12th CC	Birth	PM	Education	Ethnicity	Gender	Ref.
Chu Ngọc Anh	New	Member	1965	1998	Graduate	Kinh	Male	
Nguyễn Xuân Anh	New	Member	1976	2004	Graduate	Kinh	Male	
Tất Thành Cang	New	Member	1971	1991	Undergraduate	Kinh	Male	
Bùi Văn Cường	New	Member	1965	1992	Undergraduate	Kinh	Male	
Nguyễn Phú Cường	New	Member	1967	1995	Graduate	Kinh	Male	
Nguyễn Tân Cương	New	Member	1966	—	Undergraduate	Kinh	Male	
Nguyễn Công Định	New	Not	1967	—	—	Kinh	Male	
Trần Hồng Hà	New	Member	1963	1990	Graduate	Kinh	Male	
Ngô Đông Hải	New	Alternate	1970	1998	Graduate	Kinh	Male	
Điểu K'Ré	Alternate	Member	1968	1993	Graduate	Mnong	Male	
Hầu A Lềnh	New	Member	1973	1994	Graduate	Hmong	Male	
Bh’ Riu Liếc	New	Not	1965	—	—	Cơtu	Male	
Nguyễn Hồng Lĩnh	New	Member	1964	1986	Undergraduate	Kinh	Male	
Lâm Văn Mẫn	New	Alternate	1970	1998	Graduate	Khmer	Male	
Phạm Hoài Nam	New	Member	1967	—	Graduate	Kinh	Male	
Nguyễn Thanh Nghị	New	Member	1976	1991	Graduate	Kinh	Male	
Phùng Xuân Nhạ	New	Member	1963	1997	Graduate	Kinh	Male	
Trần Lưu Quang	New	Member	1967	1997	Undergraduate	Kinh	Male	
Nguyễn Thị Thanh	New	Member	1967	1988	Graduate	Kinh	Female	
Trần Sỹ Thanh	New	Member	1971	1995	Graduate	Kinh	Male	
Nguyễn Văn Thể	New	Member	1966	1993	Graduate	Kinh	Male	
Nguyễn Khắc Toàn	New	Alternate	1970	1999	Undergraduate	Kinh	Male	
Nguyễn Thị Tuyến	New	Not	1971	1995	Undergraduate	Kinh	Female	
Nguyễn Đắc Vinh	New	Member	1972	2003	Graduate	Kinh	Male	
Võ Thị Ánh Xuân	New	Member	1970	1994	Undergraduate	Kinh	Female	
