= Head of the Commission for Information and Education =

Political party office-holder in Vietnam

The Head of the Commission for Information and Education of the Central Committee of the Communist Party of Vietnam is responsible for leading the propaganda apparat of the Communist Party. Since 2007, every commission head has been a member of the Politburo.

== Officeholders ==
=== Central Cultural Committee (1949–1950) ===
No. (Note: These numbers are not official.)	Name (birth–death)	Took office	Left office	National Congress
1	Trần Huy Liệu (1901–1969)	1949	1950	1st National Congress (1935–1951)

=== Central Propaganda Department (1950–1951) ===
No.	Name (birth–death)	Took office	Left office	National Congress
1	Tố Hữu (1920–2002)	1950	1951	1st National Congress (1935–1951)

=== Education Commission (1950–1951) ===
No.	Name (birth–death)	Took office	Left office	National Congress
1	Hà Huy Giáp (1908–1995)	1950	1951	1st National Congress (1935–1951)

=== Central Propaganda Commission (1951–1989) ===
No.	Name (birth–death)	Took office	Left office	Rank (Note: The Central Committee when it convenes for its first session after being elected by a National Party Congress elects the Politburo. According to David Koh, in interviews with several high-standing Vietnamese officials, the Politburo ranking is based upon the number of approval votes by the Central Committee. Lê Hồng Anh, the Minister of Public Security, was ranked 2nd in the 10th Politburo because he received the second-highest number of approval votes. Another example being Tô Huy Rứa of the 10th Politburo, he was ranked lowest because he received the lowest approval vote of the 10th Central Committee when he stood for election for a seat in the Politburo. This system was implemented at the 1st plenum of the 10th Central Committee. The Politburo ranking functioned as an official order of precedence before the 10th Party Congress, and some believe it still does.)	National Congress
1	Trường Chinh (1907–1988)	1951	1956	2	2nd National Congress (1951–1960)
2	Tố Hữu (1920–2002)	1956	1959	—	2nd National Congress (1951–1960)
1	Trường Chinh (1907–1988)	1959	1960	2	2nd National Congress (1951–1960)
2	Tố Hữu (1920–2002)	1960	1980	—	3rd National Congress (1960–1976); 4th National Congress (1976–1982)
3	Hoàng Tùng (1920–2010)	1980	1982	—	4th National Congress (1976–1982)
4	Đào Duy Tùng (1924–1998)	1982	1987	—	5th National Congress (1982–1986)
4	Đào Duy Tùng (1924–1998)	1982	1987	—	6th National Congress (1986–1991)
5	Trần Trọng Tân (1926–2014)	1987	1989	—	6th National Congress (1986–1991)

=== Culture and Education Commission (1958–1959) ===
No.	Name (birth–death)	Took office	Left office	Rank	National Congress
1	Hà Huy Giáp (1908–1995)	1958	1959	14	3rd National Congress (1951–1960)

=== Central Commission for Science and Education (1968–2007) ===
No.	Name (birth–death)	Took office	Left office	Rank	National Congress
1	Tố Hữu (1920–2002)	1960	1980	15	3rd National Congress (1960–1976); 4th National Congress (1976–1982)
2	Bùi Thanh Khiết (1924–1984)	1980	7 January 1984	—	4th National Congress (1976–1982)
2	Bùi Thanh Khiết (1924–1984)	1980	7 January 1984	—	5th National Congress (1982–1986)
3	Lê Quang Đạo (1921–1999)	1984	1987	—	5th National Congress (1982–1986)
3	Lê Quang Đạo (1921–1999)	1984	1987	—	6th National Congress (1986–1991)
4	Đặng Quốc Bảo (born 1927)	1987	1991	—	6th National Congress (1986–1991)
5	Nguyễn Đình Tứ (1932–1996)	1991	28 June 1996	—	7th National Congress (1991–1996)
6	Đặng Hữu (born 1930)	1996	2001	—	8th National Congress (1996–2001)
7	Đỗ Nguyên Phương (1937–2008)	2002	2007	—	9th National Congress (2001–2006); 10th National Congress (2006–2011)

=== Central Commission on Culture (1980–1989) ===
No.	Name (birth–death)	Took office	Left office	National Congress
1	Trần Độ (1923–2002)	1980	1982	4th National Congress (1976–1982)
2	Hà Xuân Trường (1924–2006)	1982	1986	5th National Congress (1962–1986)
1	Trần Độ (1923–2002)	1986	1989	6th National Congress (1986–1991)

=== Central Ideology and Culture Commission (1989–2007) ===
No.	Name (birth–death)	Took office	Left office	Rank	National Congress
1	Trần Trọng Tân (1926–2014)	1989	1991	—	4th National Congress (1986–1991)
2	Hà Đăng (born ?)	1991	1996	—	7th National Congress (1991–1996)
3	Hữu Thọ (1932–2015)	1996	2001	—	8th National Congress (1996–2001)
4	Nguyễn Khoa Điềm (born 1943)	2001	2006	15	9th National Congress (2001–2006)
5	Tô Huy Rứa (born 1947)	2006	2007	10	10th National Congress (2006–2011)

=== Central Commission for Information and Education (2007–2025) ===
No.	Name (birth–death)	Took office	Left office	Rank	National Congress
1	Tô Huy Rứa (born 1947)	2007	2011	15	10th National Congress (2006–2011)
2	Đinh Thế Huynh (born 1953)	2011	2016	13	11th National Congress (2011–2016)
3	Võ Văn Thưởng (born 1970)	2016	2021	17	12th National Congress (2016–2021)
4	Nguyễn Trọng Nghĩa (born 1962)	2021	2025	17	13th National Congress (2021–2026)

== Bibliography ==
- Koh, David (July–August 2008). "Leadership Changes at the 10th Congress of the Vietnamese Communist Party". Asian Survey. 48 (4). University of California Press: 650–672. doi:10.1525/as.2008.48.4.650. JSTOR 10.1525/as.2008.48.4.650.
- Van, Canh Nguyen; Cooper, Earle (1983). Vietnam under Communism, 1975–1982. Hoover Press. ISBN 9780817978518.
