= 10th Secretariat of the Communist Party of Vietnam =

Secretariat of Vietnam's Communist Party

The 10th Secretariat of the Communist Party of Vietnam (CPV), formally the 10th Secretariat of the Central Committee of the Communist Party of Vietnam (Vietnamese: Ban Bí thư Ban Chấp hành Trung ương Đảng Cộng sản Việt Nam Khoá X), was partly elected by a decision of the 10th Politburo and partly elected by the 1st Plenary Session of the 10th Central Committee (CC) in the immediate aftermath of the 10th National Congress.

== Members ==
Members of the 10th Secretariat of the Communist Party of Vietnam
Rank	Name	9th SEC		11th SEC		Birth	PM	Birthplace	Education	Ethnicity	Gender	Ref.
Rank	Name	New	Rank	New	Rank	Birth	PM	Birthplace	Education	Ethnicity	Gender	Ref.
1	Nông Đức Mạnh	Old	1	Not	—	1940	1963	Bắc Kạn Province	Graduate	Tày	Male	
2	Trương Tấn Sang	New	—	Reelected	2	1949	1969	Long An province	Undergraduate	Kinh	Male	
3	Trương Vĩnh Trọng	Old	9	Not	—	1942	—	Bến Tre province	Graduate	Kinh	Male	
4	Nguyễn Văn Chi	Old	11	Not	—	1945	1965	Đà Nẵng City	—	Kinh	Male	
5	Phạm Quang Nghị	New	—	Relieved	—	1949	1973	Thanh Hóa province	Graduate	Kinh	Male	
6	Lê Văn Dũng	Old	6	Not	—	1945	1965	Bến Tre province	Undergraduate	Kinh	Male	
7	Tòng Thị Phóng	Old	7	Not	—	1954	1981	Sơn La province	Graduate	Thái	Female	
8	Tô Huy Rứa	New	—	Reelected	4	1947	1967	Thanh Hóa province	Graduate	Kinh	Male	
9	Hồ Đức Việt	By-election	—	Not	—	1947	1967	Nghệ An province	Graduate	Kinh	Male	
10	Ngô Văn Dụ	By-election	—	Reelected	5	1947	1969	Vĩnh Phúc province	Undergraduate	Kinh	Male	
11	Hà Thị Khiết	By-election	—	Reelected	9	1950	1969	Tuyên Quang province	Undergraduate	Tày	Female	

== Bibliography ==
- Truong, Mai (2022). "Declining opportunities for speaking out: The impact of Vietnam's new leadership on grassroots collective action". Asian Journal of Comparative Politics. OnlineFirst: 50–68. doi:10.1177/20578911221139764. S2CID 254009559.
