= Van Hien =

Van Hien may refer to:

== People ==
- Henry van Hien (1857 or 1858 — 1928), Gold Coast politician,
- Nguyễn Văn Hiến (born 1954), Admiral, and Vice Minister of Defense in Vietnam

== Places ==
- Đại Nam Văn Hiến, a tourism complex in Bình Dương Province, Vietnam
- Văn Hiến University, a university in Ho Chi Minh City, Vietnam
