= Quang Vinh =

Quang Vinh may refer to several entity in Vietnam, including:

== Place ==
- Quang Vinh, Biên Hòa, a ward of Biên Hòa

== Person ==
- Quang Vinh (singer), a singer
- Bùi Quang Vinh, former Minister of Planning and Investment of Vietnam
