= Quock =

Quock may refer to:

- Quock Walker (1753-?), African American slave who sued for and won his freedom
- Audrey Quock (born 1977), Asian American model and actress
- Quock, alternate spelling of Guo, one of the most common Chinese surnames

== See also ==
- Quốc, a Vietnamese given name
