= Trần Độ =

Vietnamese journalist (1923–2002)

Lieutenant General Trần Độ
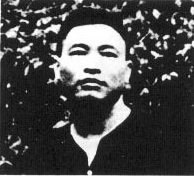

Vice Chairman of the 8th National Assembly of Vietnam
- In office 19 April 1987 – 19 July 1992
- Chairman: Lê Quang Đạo

Head of the Central Commission on Culture
- In office 1986–1989
- Preceded by: Hà Xuân Trường
- Succeeded by: Trần Trọng Tân (as Head of the Central Ideology and Culture Department)
- In office 1980–1982
- Preceded by: position created
- Succeeded by: Hà Xuân Trường

Deputy Minister of Culture
- In office 1976–1980
- Minister: Nguyễn Văn Hiếu

Deputy Head of the Central Propaganda Commission
- In office 1976–1980
- Head: Tố Hữu

Vice Chief of the General Department of Politics of the People's Army of Vietnam
- In office 1974–1976
- Chief: Song Hào

Vice political commissar of the Central Military Commission for South Vietnam
- In office October 1963 – 1975

Personal details
- Born: Tạ Ngọc Phách; 23 September 1923 Tây Giang, Tiền Hải, Thái Bình, French Indochina
- Died: 9 August 2002 (aged 78) Hanoi, Vietnam
- Party: Communist Party of Vietnam (Expelled on 4 January 1999)
- Awards: Order of Ho Chi Minh; Military Exploit Order (1st class, 3rd class)
- Nickname: Chín Vinh (nom de guerre)

Military service
- Allegiance: (North Vietnam) Vietnam; Provisional Revolutionary Government of the Republic of South Vietnam
- Branch/service: People's Liberation Armed Forces of South Vietnam
- Years of service: 1941–1986
- Rank: Lieutenant General
- Battles/wars: First Indochina War; Battle of Hanoi (1946); Battle of Điện Biên Phủ; Vietnam War; Tet Offensive; Operation Junction City

Trần Độ (1923–2002) was a Vietnamese politician and Lieutenant General of the People's Army of Vietnam. He was expelled from the Communist Party of Vietnam due to his opposing and critical opinions of the party and the state of Vietnam, particularly during post-Vietnam War.

== Early years ==
His real name was Tạ Ngọc Phách. He grew up in Thái Bình Province. His father worked for bureau of interpretation in Hanoi, a quite high social status.

In 1939, he became a journalist in Hanoi. He was captured by the French that year but then released due to lack of evidence.

He joined the Communist Party of Vietnam in 1940. At the end of 1941, he was captured again. This time, he was sentenced to 15 years imprison. Late 1941, from Hỏa Lò Prison, he was exiled to Sơn La. Here, he was in prison with Lê Đức Thọ, Xuân Thuỷ,... In 1943, on prison move to Côn Đảo, he escaped, continuing revolution activity. He led the protest in and started his military career.

== In Indochina War ==
1946 - He was a leader of Hanoi in the field of National Defense against the French. In the Battle of Hanoi (1946), he was the political commissar of Việt Minh forces in the city.

In late 1949, the PAVN General Command formed its two original regular regiments: the 174th (Cao Bắc Lạng) and the 209th (Sông Lô). Trần Độ was appointed political commissar of the 209th, alongside Lê Trọng Tấn—the commander.

1950 - Major General

In the Battle of Điện Biên Phủ, Trần Độ was the political commissar, together with the commander Lê Trọng Tấn commanded 312th Brigade attacking and eliminating Béatrice position (Him Lam) of French Central positions (Vietnamese: phân khu Trung tâm - Mường Thanh).

== In Vietnam War ==
In October 1964, Maj. Gen. Trần Độ was assigned to South Vietnam to serve as Deputy Commissar of the Liberation Army of South Vietnam (LASV or PLAF). Accompanying him were Gen. Nguyễn Chí Thanh - COSVN Secretary cum LASV Commissar, Maj. Gen. Lê Trọng Tấn - Deputy Commander, Col. Hoàng Cầm and several seasoned mid and high-ranking officers.

1974 - Lieutenant General

1974 to 1976 - Vice President of Central Commission of Politics.

== Reform view ==
As a leader of national culture (after the war, he worked in the culture section), he wanted to give it more freedom. He is aware that culture without freedom is dead and culture with only propaganda is also dead. The more control, the more deadly culture is and the rarer valuable masterpiece.

In terms of Communist Party leadership, he said:" I advocate the leadership role of the Party. However, leadership does not mean dictatorship. History shows that every dictatorship will eventually end up in corruption, rotten society and Party itself."

In his opinion, the underlying cause of negative phenomenon in the Party and the society is partly due to the absolute rule of Communist Party.

He insisted that: Communist Party must give up dictator regime, give power to the national assembly, government. There must be laws allowing freedom for a new party, freedom of speech, journalism laws, publishing. Election laws, forgo the decision jusridiction of the Party.

It is this opinion that resulted in his expulsion from the party.
