= Bùi Tiến Dũng =

Bùi Tiến Dũng may refer to:

- Bùi Tiến Dũng (born 1951), Vietnamese politician and war veteran
- Bùi Tiến Dũng, Vietnamese football defender
- Bùi Tiến Dũng, Vietnamese football goalkeeper
