= Võ Thanh Bình =

Vietnamese politician

Vo Thanh Binh is a former Vietnamese politician who served as Secretary of the Provincial Party Committee of Ca Mau province.

== See also ==
- 10th Central Committee of the Communist Party of Vietnam
