= Hải Triều =

Vietnamese journalist, theorist, and literary critic

- Born: Nguyen Khoa Van; October 1, 1908; An Cuu village, Vietnam
- Died: August 6, 1954 (aged 45); Thanh Hoa, Vietnam
- Occupations: journalist, literary critic
- Relatives: Nguyen Khoa Diem (son)
- Writing career
- Pen name: Nam Xich Tu; Hai Trieu

Hải Triều (October 1, 1908 - August 6, 1954), birth name Nguyen Khoa Van, was a Vietnamese journalist, Marxist theorist, literary critic. He was a pioneering theorist in Vietnam's revolutionary journalism, especially through two debates that resonated greatly in the 1930s: Materialism or idealism and Art for art's sake or Art for humanity's sake. . His writings strongly criticized idealism and romantic literature, away from reality, "art for art's sake", promoting works that are realism or "social realism". at the same time also contributed to popularize Marxism to the public. He is an excellent writer, sensitive not only in literature but also in philosophical and economic issues, international politics.

== Biography ==
Hai Trieu was born in An Cuu village on the outskirts of Hue, from Le Loi, An Duong, Hai Phong, a descendant of the mandarin Nguyen Khoa Dang. His father was the Confucian Nguyen Khoa Tung, who was a member of the Trung Ky House of Representatives. His mother is female singer Dam Phuong, who works for the rights of women and children. Growing up, he studied at Quoc Hoc Hue School, then was expelled from the school for participating in patriotic youth movements.

In 1927, he joined the Tan Viet party and then went to work in Saigon. He began to participate in newspaper writing under the pen name Nam Xich Tu (the Red South boy). He made an impression through articles criticizing Sun Yat-sen's Three Peoplesism and translating Karl Marx's Capital. In 1930, he went to Ha Tinh to hold the national conference of the Indochinese Communist League, then he was arrested by the French and released. In June 1930, he was admitted to the Communist Party of Indochina and was appointed to the Provincial Party Committee of Thua Thien. In August, he went to work in Saigon and joined the Saigon - Cho Lon city party committee, writing articles for the Red Flag newspaper. In 1931, he was arrested in Saigon and sentenced to 9 years of hard labor and 8 years of house arrest. But in July 1932, he was released.

After being released from prison, Nguyen Khoa Van opened Huong Giang bookstore in Hue and at the same time began writing for Dong Phuong newspaper under a new pseudonym - Hải Triều. He began to resonate through the debates of Phan Khoi in Dong Phuong newspapers, Modern women...: "Materialism or idealism", "Does our country have feudalism or not". He was active during the Democratic Front period (1936–1939), writing articles for the newspapers Nhan Rice, Dan, New Life, Kien Van, Echo, Young Soul, News, New News... especially through a polemic on "Art for art's sake or Art for human's sake" (lasting from 1935 - 1939) with Hoai Thanh, Thieu Son, Luu Trong Lu...

In August 1940, he was detained by the French authorities in Phong Dien until March 1945. In August 1945, he participated in the robbery of the government in Hue. After the August Revolution, he worked as the Director of the Central Propaganda Department and then as the Director of the Inter-region IV Propaganda Department during the resistance war against the French. During this time, he worked mainly in propagandizing and popularizing Marxism. He was the branch president of the Karl Marxist Research Association, and the director of the magazine Learn.

He died on August 6, 1954, in Thanh Hoa, at the age of 46. He was buried in the field of Bao Da. Later, his remains were brought to the historical monument commemorating the famous Phan Boi Chau in 1984.

He is the father of poet Nguyen Khoa Diem. The name Hai Trieu is given to some streets in Ho Chi Minh City, Thanh Hoa, and Hai Phong.

== Career ==
Hải Triều authored several books, which were published before his death: Idealism or Materialism (1936), Writers and Society (1937), Popular Marxism (1938). These were among the first works in the history of Vietnamese publishing that directly and indirectly propagated Marxism to the public. After his death, his articles were collected, compiled, and published in the books On Literature and Art (1965 - compiled by Hong Chuong), Hai Trieu - Works (1987), and Hai Trieu full volume (2 volumes) (1996).

Hai Trieu studied and read many books, newspapers and novels by scholars such as Marx, Engels, Bukharin, Henri Barbusse, Maxim Gorki, André Gide, Tolstoy, and Quach Mat Nhuoc. In his writings, he often included Marx's concepts.

While keeping the pseudonym Nam Xich Tu, he wrote articles on The Later World War, Criticism of Tam Danism... and translated Karl Marx's Capital in the Unicorn and Youth Hong Ky newspapers. He is considered the first person in Vietnam to criticize Sun Yat-sen's Tam Danism

One of Hai Trieu's famous debates was Phan Khoi's debate on idealism, materialism, and feudalism. In his articles refuting Phan Khoi's opinions such as "Mr. Phan Khoi is not a materialist scholar", "Mr. Phan Khoi is an idealist scholar",..., Hai Trieu on one hand knocked him down. Phan Khoi's argument, on the other hand, cleverly introduces Marx's ideas and concepts. These articles are all collected in the book Idealism or Materialism published in 1936, written by Phan Van Hum with a preface. In another article, Hai Trieu also refuted the opinion of his predecessor Phan Boi Chau about the meaning of the word literature.

The debate Art for Art or Art for Humanity was one of the largest and longest-lasting (1935–1939) debates in the 1930s. Hai Trieu is considered the one who started the "pen-war" war. This article when writing the article "Art for art's sake or Art for human's sake" contradicts Thieu Son's "Two conceptions of literature". After that, he continued to refute the opinions of Hoai Thanh and Thieu Son about Nguyen Cong Hoan's book Kep Tu Ben, he appreciated the value of the story's content, "opening a new era for the fourth dynasty. realistic art and society in our country". Starting from the debate about Kep Tu Ben, the debate expanded to a debate between the two factions "Art for art's sake" and "Art for life's sake". Hai Trieu is the leader of the "Art for the sake of life", he appreciates the human value of works such as Kep Tu Ben, or Lan Khai's Lamentation, which he calls "reality depictions of society". ", while vehemently criticizing the concept of "Art for art's sake", he said that art is for life and cannot be placed outside of life and society. ", "irrational" and "deceitful". He also criticized romantic works far from reality, calling it "mystical, lewd" and "reactionary of the rich class". In these articles, he also appealed to like-minded writers: "Our path has been outlined, let us move forward with determination. Behind us is already a bold new humanity. with ideas, greater feelings will back us up." These opinions reappeared in Writers and Society (1937), in which Hai Trieu honored three revolutionary writers Maxim Gorki, Romain Rolland and Henri Barbusse.

The book Popular Marxism, Hai Trieu began to write in 1937, published in 1938 is the rare public document on Marxism to be published. The book was republished in 1946 and was "used as a basis for seminars and activities of the Marxist research association".

In addition to literary theory and criticism, he also wrote topical and political commentary, such as Who Burned the German Parliament, the World Economic Conference, the North Atlantic Treaty, and Nineteen Years of Architecture. in the Soviet Union...

After the August Revolution, he also wrote many critical and theoretical articles, but his main activities were in charge of propaganda, culture, and intellectuals.
