= Ngô Thị Doãn Thanh =

Vietnamese politician

Chair of Hanoi People's Council
- In office 2006–2015
- Deputy: Lê Quang Nhuệ; Nguyễn Văn Phúc
- Preceded by: Phùng Hữu Phú

Deputy Secretary of the Hanoi Party Committee
- Incumbent
- Assumed office 2006
- Secretary: Phạm Quang Nghị

Personal details
- Born: 28 October 1957 (age 69) Hanoi, Vietnam
- Party: Communist Party

Ngô Thị Doãn Thanh (born 28 October 1957 in Hanoi) is a Vietnamese politician. She was Chair of the Hanoi People's Council from 2006 to 2015. Thanh also served as the Group Secretary, a member of the Central Standing Committee of the Union, former Secretary of the District Party Committee, People's Council Chairman Thanh Xuan District.
