= Quốc =

Quốc is a Vietnamese given name. Notable people with the name include:

- Nguyễn Quốc Cường (born 1982), Vietnamese politician
- Quốc Thiên (born 1988), Vietnamese singer
- Trần Quốc Khang (1237–1300), Vietnamese prince
- Trần Quốc Tảng (died 1313), Vietnamese general
- Trần Quốc Toản (1267–1285), Vietnamese marquis
- Trần Quốc Tuấn (1228–1300), Vietnamese general
