= Nguyễn Thị Thanh Hòa =

Vietnamese politician

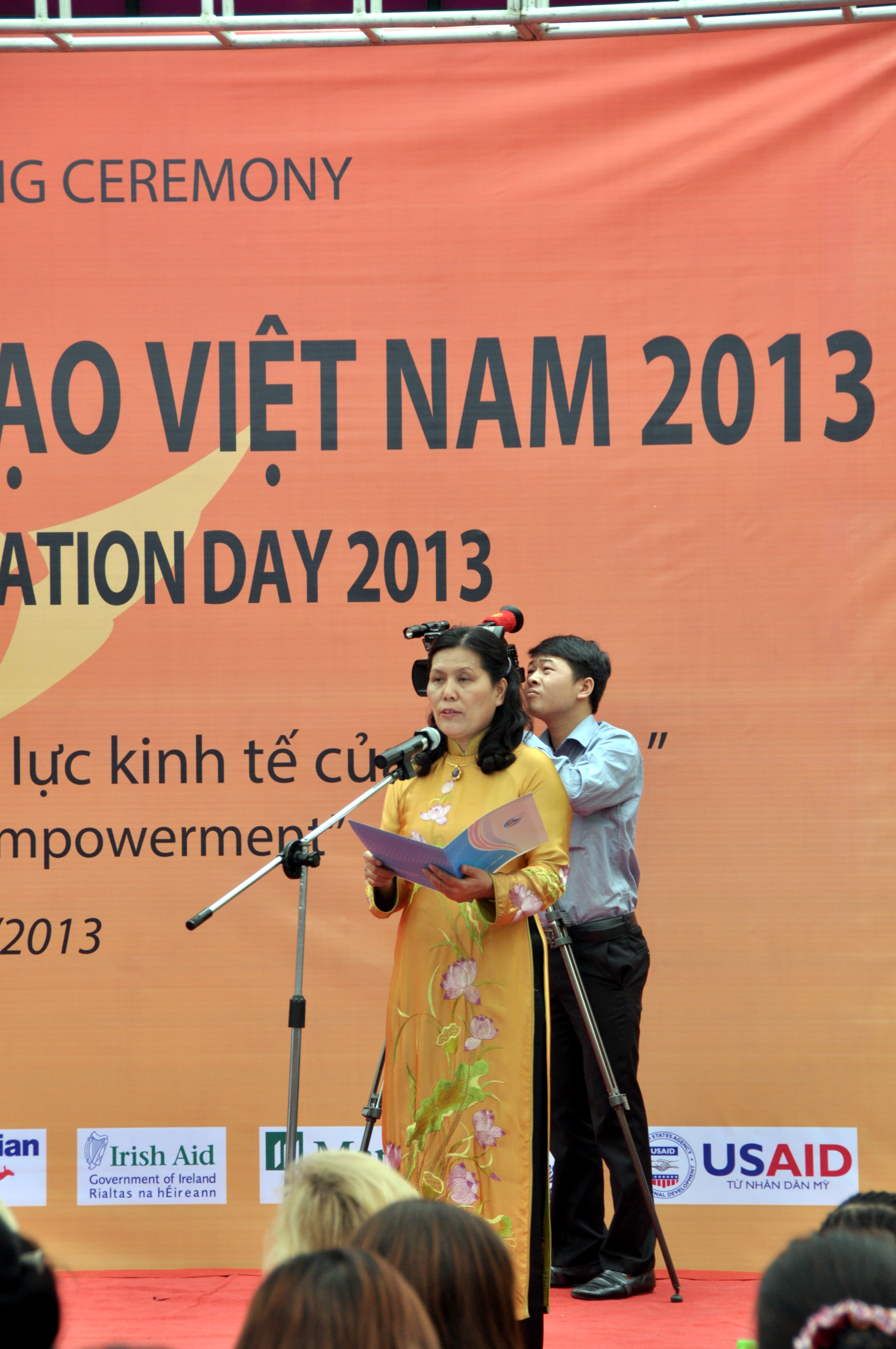
Nguyễn Thị Thanh Hòa

Nguyễn Thị Thanh Hòa (born 3 November 1954 in Tiên Du District, Bắc Ninh Province) is a Vietnamese politician. She was a member of the 10th and 11th Central Committee and is a member of the National Assembly (Vietnam). She is currently the President of the Vietnam Women's Union (2007–).
