= Đinh Thế Huynh =

Vietnamese politician and journalist

His Excellency Đinh Thế Huynh
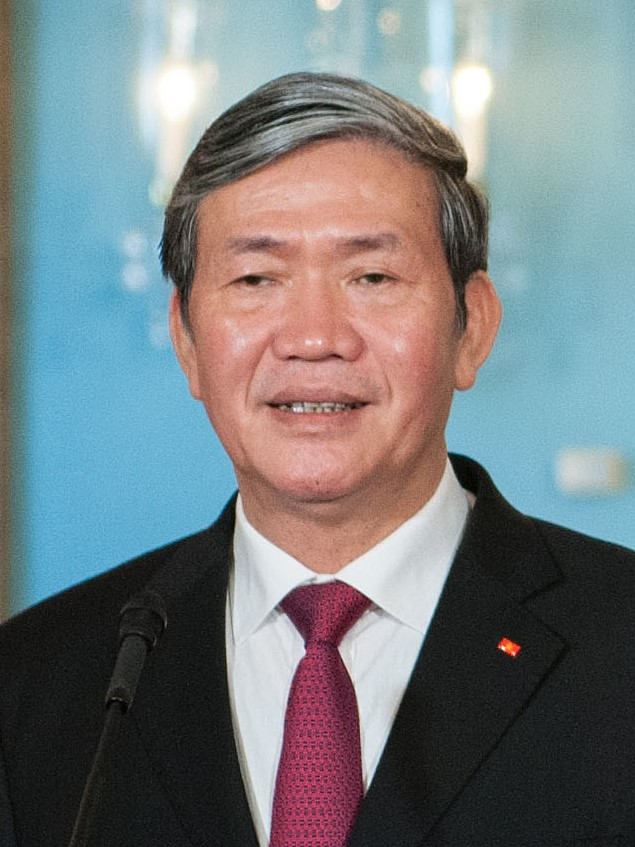
- Huynh at the U.S. Department of State in 2016

Permanent Member of the Secretariat
- In office 4 February 2016 – 2 March 2018
- General Secretary: Nguyễn Phú Trọng
- Preceded by: Lê Hồng Anh
- Succeeded by: Trần Quốc Vượng

Head of the Party's Central Propaganda Commission
- In office 8 February 2011 – 4 February 2016
- General Secretary: Nguyễn Phú Trọng
- Preceded by: Tô Huy Rứa
- Succeeded by: Võ Văn Thưởng

Chairman of the Party's Central Theoretical Council
- In office 28 March 2011 – 2 March 2018
- General Secretary: Nguyễn Phú Trọng
- Preceded by: Tô Huy Rứa
- Succeeded by: Nguyễn Xuân Thắng

Personal details
- Born: 15 May 1953 (age 73) Nam Định Province, French Indochina
- Party: Communist Party of Vietnam (1974–2021)
- Education: Moscow State University

Đinh Thế Huynh (Vietnamese pronunciation: [ʔɗïŋ˧˧ tʰe˧˦ hwïŋ̟˧˧]; born 15 May 1953 in Nam Định Province) is a Vietnamese politician and journalist who served as the Permanent Member of the Secretariat of the Communist Party of Vietnam, one of the country's five key leaders along with the General Secretary, President, Prime Minister, and the Chairman of the National Assembly. Once rumored to become the next Party's General Secretary, he stepped down in 2018 due to illness.

Đinh Thế Huynh is a member of the 11th and 12th Politburo and the former chairman of the Party's Central Theoretical Council. He also served as head of the Party's Propaganda Department between 2011 and 2016. A former editor-in-chief of state newspaper Nhân Dân, Đinh Thế Huynh became a member of the Communist Party of Vietnam on 8 August 1974. He represented the city of Da Nang in Vietnam's 14th National Assembly.

== Early life ==
Đinh Thế Huynh was born on 15 May 1953 in Xuân Trường District in Nam Định Province. He joined the Vietnam People's Army in 1971 and participated in the 1972 battle of Quảng Trị. He joined the Communist Party in 1974. After the war, he was sent by the new communist government to study at Lomonosov Moscow State University and graduated with a degree in journalism.

In 1988, Đinh Thế Huynh assumed the position of Vice editor of Nhân Dân, the official newspaper of the Communist Party of Vietnam. In 2001, he was appointed editor-in-chief of the paper and became a member of the Central Committee of the Communist Party. In 2011, he became member of the Politburo and Head of the Propaganda Department.
