= Bùi Quang Vinh =

Vietnamese politician

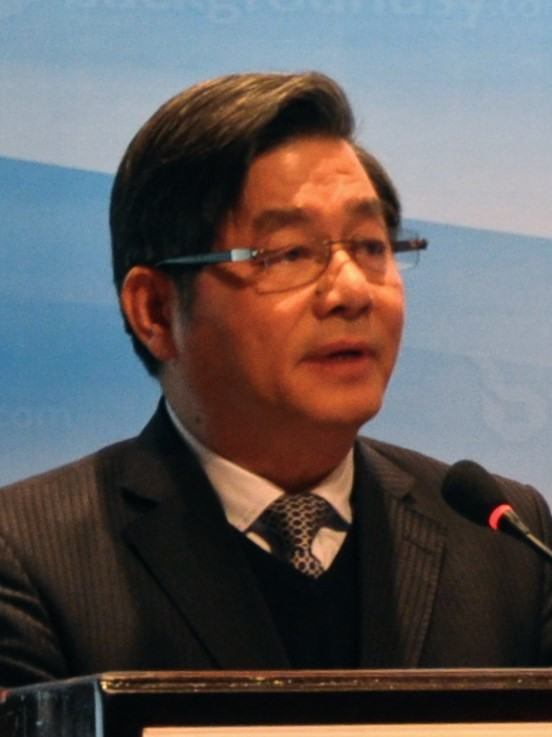

Ministry of Planning and Investment
- In office 3 August 2011 – 8 April 2016
- Prime Minister: Nguyễn Tấn Dũng; Nguyễn Xuân Phúc
- Preceded by: Võ Hồng Phúc
- Succeeded by: Nguyễn Chí Dũng

Member of the 11th Central Committee of the Communist Party of Vietnam
- In office 18 January 2011 – 27 January 2016

Personal details
- Born: 8 August 1953 (age 73) Hanoi
- Party: Communist Party

Bùi Quang Vinh (born 8 August 1953 in Hanoi) is the Minister of Planning and Investment of Vietnam. He is a member of the 11th Central Committee of the Communist Party of Vietnam.
