= Nguyễn Thế Thảo =

Vietnamese politician

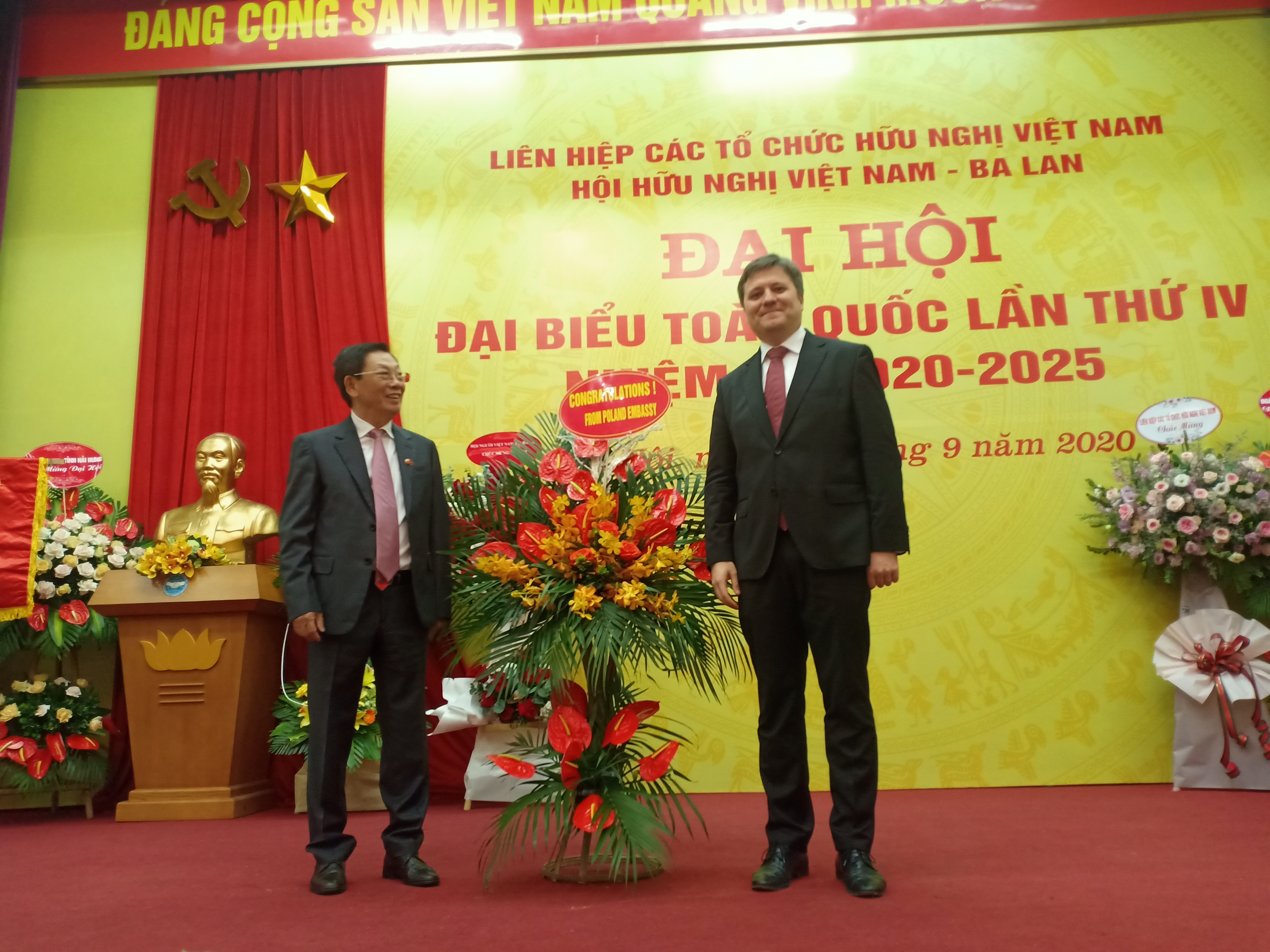
- Nguyễn Thế Thảo, Wojciech Gerwel

Chairman of the Hanoi People's Committee
- In office 2007–2015
- Preceded by: Nguyễn Quốc Triệu

Personal details
- Born: 21 March 1952 (age 74) Bắc Ninh Province, Vietnam
- Party: Communist Party
- Education: Tadeusz Kościuszko University of Technology

Nguyễn Thế Thảo (born March 21, 1952, in Quế Võ District, Bắc Ninh Province) is a Vietnamese politician.

Nguyễn Thế Thảo graduated from the Tadeusz Kościuszko University of Technology in Kraków. He was chairman of the Hanoi People's Committee from 2007 to 2015 and is member of the Central Executive Committee of the Communist Party of Vietnam XI.

== Honours ==
- Bene Merito (2016)
