= Bùi Tiến Dũng (politician) =

Vietnamese politician and war veteran

- Born: 1951 (age 74–75)
- Education: Polytechnic University of Hanoi
- Occupations: politician and war veteran
- Known for: Member of Vietnam's Central Party Committee

Bùi Tiến Dũng (born 1951) is a Vietnamese politician and war veteran who serves as a Member of Vietnam's Central Party Committee, Party Secretary (commonly known as Party Chief) of Thai Binh Provincial Party Committee, and Chairman of Thai Binh People's Council.

Prior to his position as the Party Chief, Dung spent six years as Chairman of Thai Binh People's Committee, commonly known as Governor of Thai Binh Province, and Deputy Chief of the Provincial Party Committee. Before that, he served as Mayor of Thai Binh City – the Province's capital city.

Before joining the government, Dung spent over 20 years at Thai Binh Mechanics Company, serving in various positions including as Director of the company for 10 years, Vice Director, and Chief Mechanical Officer.

Dung holds a bachelor's degree in Mechanical Engineering from the then-Polytechnic University of Hanoi (now known as Hanoi University of Science and Technology) in 1975. Upon finishing the second year in college, Dung went to spend two years in the Ground Forces Unit of the North Vietnamese Army between 1971 and 1973 in the Vietnam War.
