= Tô Huy Rứa =

Vietnamese politician (born 1947)

Head of the Organizing Commission
- In office 8 February 2011 – 5 February 2016
- Preceded by: Hồ Đức Việt
- Succeeded by: Phạm Minh Chính

Head of the Propaganda Department
- In office 2007 – 7 February 2011
- Preceded by: Đỗ Nguyên Phương and Nguyễn Khoa Điềm
- Succeeded by: Đinh Thế Huynh

Chairman of the Theoretical Council
- In office 8 May 2007 – 27 March 2011
- Preceded by: Nguyễn Phú Trọng
- Succeeded by: Đinh Thế Huynh

Personal details
- Born: 4 June 1947 (age 77); Thanh Hóa Province
- Political party: Communist Party of Vietnam

Tô Huy Rứa (Vietnamese pronunciation: [to˧˧ hwi˧˧ zɨə˧˦]; born 4 June 1947 in Thanh Hóa Province) is a Vietnamese politician and served as previous Chairman of the CPV Commission for Organisation. During the 10th Politburo, Tô held the posts of Chairman of the Propaganda Department of the Communist Party of Vietnam and Chairman of the Theoretical Council. He is a member of the 11th Politburo, in which he is ranked 7th.
