= Commission for Information and Education =

Advisory body to the Central Committee

- Ban Tuyên giáo Trung ương Đảng Cộng sản Việt Nam
- Formation: 1930; 96 years ago
- Type: Advisory agency of the Central Committee
- Head: Trịnh Văn Quyết
- Parent organization: Central Committee; Politburo; Secretariat

The Commission for Information and Education is an administrative body of the Central Committee of the Communist Party of Vietnam. It is one of the most important institutions within the Vietnamese political system since its main responsibility is to defend, articulate and develop Communist Party theory.

The current Head of the Central Information and Education Commission is Trịnh Văn Quyết.

== Heads ==
modern incarnation

- Tô Huy Rứa (2007–2011)
- Đinh Thế Huynh (2011–2016)
- Võ Văn Thưởng (2016–2021)
- Colonel General Nguyễn Trọng Nghĩa (2021–2025)
