= Nguyễn Văn Hiến =

Vietnamese admiral (born 1954)

Admiral Nguyen Van Hien
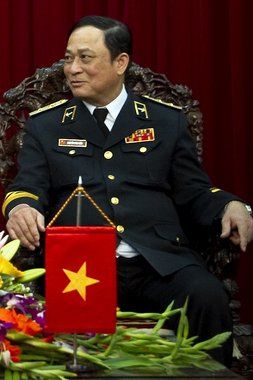
- Born: October 15, 1954 (age 71); Gia Vien, Ninh Binh, Vietnam
- Allegiance: Vietnam
- Branch: Vietnam People's Navy
- Service years: 1970–2016
- Rank: Admiral

Nguyễn Văn Hiến (born October 15, 1954) is a Vietnamese retired admiral and former Vice Minister of Defense from 2009 to 2016.

Hiến was born in Gia Tan, Gia Vien, Ninh Binh province, Vietnam. He joined the Communist Party of Vietnam on April 26, 1976 (officially on October 26, 1977). Hiến is a member of the Central Committee of the Communist Party of Vietnam and a congressman in the National Assembly of Vietnam.

In December 5, 2011, he was only the second Vietnamese person to be appointed Admiral of Vietnam People's Navy after Admiral Giáp Văn Cương.

== Career ==
In 1973, Hiến passed on Le Quy Don Technical University, courses 8. After one year of study at the Technical University, he achieved excellent results. The Ministry of Defence sent him to study at the Missile Academy in Azerbaijan. Returning home, he worked for the navy.

In 1998, Hiến was appointed Commander of Naval Region 4.

In 2000, Hiến was appointed Deputy Commander cum Chief of Staff of the Navy. He was promoted to the rank of rear admiral.

In 2004, Hiến became Commander of the Navy, and he was promoted to the rank of Vice Admiral.

In 2009, Hiến was appointed Deputy Minister of Defense cum Navy Commander.

In 2011, Hiến was promoted to full Admiral.

In August 2015, he left the position of Commander of the Navy, and Rear Admiral Pham Hoai Nam became the new Navy Commander.

In 2016, he retired and left the position of Deputy Minister of Defense.

On 21 May 2020, he was arrested and jailed for four years due to fraud during his time in the navy. The Navy's Court expressed he sold three lots of land at Ton Duc Thang street for his own personal gain along with his nephew, who received 20 years in prison.
