= Nguyễn Quốc Cường =

Vietnamese politician

Nguyễn Quốc Cường (born 1982) is the People's Council Chairman of Bắc Giang Province of Vietnam.
