= Nguyễn Khoa Điềm =

Vietnamese poet and government literary official

Personal details
- Born: Nguyễn Khoa Điềm; April 15, 1943 (age 82) Phong Điền district, Thừa Thiên Huế, Indochina
- Parent: Hải Triều
- Education: Hanoi National University of Education
- Occupation: Poet, politician

Nguyễn Hải Dương (born in Phong Điền District in Thừa Thiên Huế province on 15 April 1943) pen name and political name Nguyễn Khoa Điềm is a Vietnamese poet and government literary official.

He graduated from Hanoi National University of Education. His work is included in the book, Six Vietnamese Poets.
