= Phạm Quang Nghị =

Secretary of the Hanoi Party Committee
- In office 28 June 2006 – 5 February 2016
- Preceded by: Nguyễn Phú Trọng
- Succeeded by: Hoàng Trung Hải

Member of the Politburo
- In office 25 April 2006 – 28 January 2016

Minister of Culture-Information
- In office 28 June 2001 – 27 June 2006
- Prime Minister: Phan Văn Khải
- Preceded by: Nguyễn Khoa Điềm
- Succeeded by: Lê Doãn Hợp

Personal details
- Born: 2 September 1949 (age 77) Thanh Hóa Province, Vietnam
- Party: Communist Party of Vietnam

Phạm Quang Nghị (Vietnamese pronunciation: [faːm˧˨ʔ kwaːŋ˧˧ ŋi˧˨ʔ]; born 2 September 1949 in Thanh Hóa Province) was the Secretary of the Party Committee in Ha Noi City from 2011 to 2016. He is a member of the 11th Politburo, in which he is ranked 9th.

== Early life and career ==
Phạm Quang Nghị was born in Yên Định District in Thanh Hóa Province. In 1967, he studied at the Hanoi University (now Hanoi National University) and in 1970 he finished his third year of military service. He was later transferred to Nguyen Ai Quoc School. Phạm Quang Nghị was active in the field of journalism and propaganda.

During his time serving in the Army, he served as a field reporter, a researcher of the Central Propaganda Department of the Department, an editorial staff of the "Arts and Entertainment" Magazine under the Southern Subcommittee.

After April 30, 1975, Phạm Quang Nghị returned to study at the Faculty of Philosophy, Nguyen Ai Quoc 5 School (now the Academy of Journalism and Propaganda), then worked at the Central Propaganda Department. He holds a doctorate and a doctorate in philosophy at the Soviet Academy of Social Sciences.

Since 1985, he has been a member of the Central Committee for Ideology and Culture, as well as a secretary for Politburo Member Đào Duy Tùng.

From 1988 to October 1997, he worked in various positions from the Deputy Director, the Director of the Center for Ideological Information, to the Standing Deputy Chairman of the Central Committee for Ideology and Culture. In 1994, Secretary of the Central Party Committee for Ideology and Culture, Member of the Party Committee for External Affairs, Party Secretary of the Central Committee for Ideological Work.

At the 8th National Congress of the Communist Party of Vietnam, he was elected to the Central Executive Committee. In November 1997, he was appointed secretary of the Hà Nam Provincial Committee, after the province was re-established from Hà Nam Ninh province.

== Minister of culture and information ==
At the 9th National Congress of the Communist Party of Vietnam, he was re-elected to the Central Committee. In July 2001, he was appointed Minister of Culture and Information, Secretary of the Party Committee of the Ministry of Culture and Information.

In May 2002, he was elected member of the 11th National Assembly of Ha Nam province. At the Party's 10th National Congress in April 2006, he was re-elected member of the Central Committee, was elected Politburo member, Secretary of the Central Committee of the Communist Party of Vietnam . At the third plenum of the Central Committee of the Party (24-27 June 2006), he was excluded from the Central Secretariat.
