= Võ Văn Thưởng =

President of Vietnam from 2023 to 2024

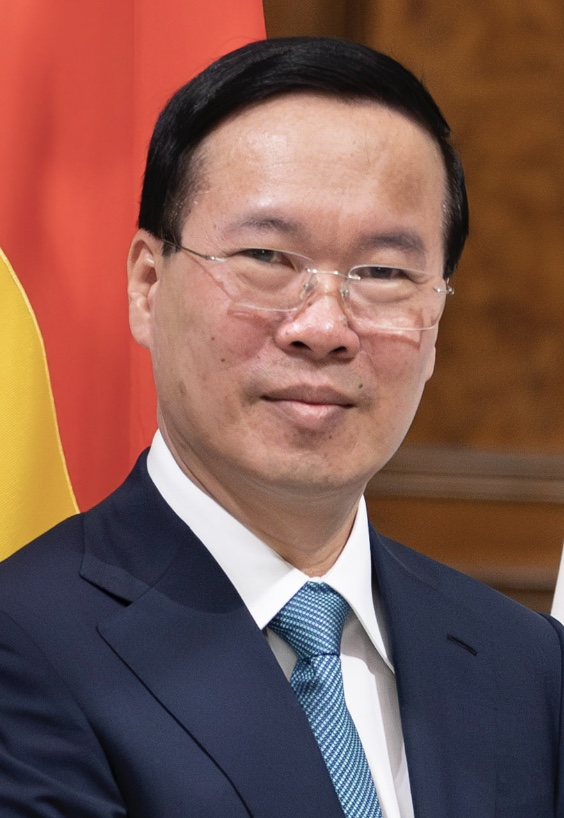
- Thưởng in 2023

12th President of Vietnam
- In office 2 March 2023 – 21 March 2024
- Prime Minister: Phạm Minh Chính
- Vice President: Võ Thị Ánh Xuân
- Preceded by: Nguyễn Xuân Phúc
- Succeeded by: Tô Lâm

Permanent Member of the Secretariat
- In office 5 February 2021 – 6 March 2023
- General Secretary: Nguyễn Phú Trọng
- Preceded by: Trần Quốc Vượng
- Succeeded by: Trương Thị Mai

Head of the Party Central Informantion and Education Commission
- In office 4 February 2016 – 19 February 2021
- General Secretary: Nguyễn Phú Trọng
- Preceded by: Đinh Thế Huynh
- Succeeded by: Nguyễn Trọng Nghĩa

Permanent Deputy Party Secretary of Ho Chi Minh City
- In office 15 April 2014 – 4 February 2016
- Secretary: Lê Thanh Hải
- Preceded by: Nguyễn Văn Đua
- Succeeded by: Tất Thành Cang

Party Secretary of Quảng Ngãi province
- In office 11 August 2011 – 15 April 2014
- Preceded by: Nguyễn Hòa Bình
- Succeeded by: Nguyễn Minh (Acting)

First Secretary of the Communist Youth Union
- In office 29 July 2006 – 11 August 2011
- Preceded by: Đào Ngọc Dung
- Succeeded by: Nguyễn Đắc Vinh

President of the Vietnam Youth Federation
- In office 29 February 2008 – 27 April 2010
- Preceded by: Nông Quốc Tuấn
- Succeeded by: Nguyễn Phước Lộc

Personal details
- Born: 13 December 1970 (age 55) Hải Dương, North Vietnam
- Party: Communist Party of Vietnam
- Spouse: Phan Thị Thanh Tâm
- Education: University of Hồ Chí Minh City; Ho Chi Minh City University of Social Sciences and Humanities; Hồ Chí Minh National Academy of Politics
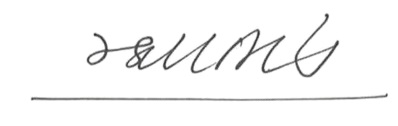
- Signature

Võ Văn Thưởng (Vietnamese: [vɔ̌ˀ vɐ̄n t̺ʰɯə̂ŋ]; born 13 December 1970) is a Vietnamese politician who served as the 12th president of Vietnam from March 2023 to March 2024, being the youngest person to serve in this position since the country's reunification at the age of 52. His resignation after just over one year in office amidst the Communist Party's anti-corruption campaign made him the second shortest-serving president in Vietnamese history, after Tô Lâm.

Thưởng is a member of the Communist Party of Vietnam, holding a master's degree in philosophy and an advanced diploma in political theory. He was a member of the 12th, 14th and 15th National Assembly of Vietnam, and a member of the Central Committee of the Communist Party of Vietnam from 2011 until his resignation in 2024.

Prior to entering the Politburo, he had served as Standing Deputy Party Secretary of Ho Chi Minh City; Party Secretary of Quảng Ngãi province; Standing Secretary and First Secretary of the Central Committee of the Ho Chi Minh Communist Youth Union, and Chairman of the Vietnam Youth Federation.

Võ Văn Thưởng first joined the Politburo of the Central Committee of the Communist Party of Vietnam in 2016 after the 12th National Congress, at that time he had just turned 45 years old, becoming the youngest member of the Politburo at that time. He held the position of Head of the Central Propaganda Department from 2016 to 2021. He continued to be re-elected for the 13th term of the Politburo and became Permanent Member of the Secretariat from 2021 to 2023. He was also regarded as a close ally and a potential successor to General Secretary of the Communist Party of Vietnam Nguyễn Phú Trọng.

Võ Văn Thưởng became the 12th President of Vietnam on 2 March 2023 after a month and a half, former President Nguyễn Xuân Phúc resigned due to political responsibility due to Phúc's subordinates being caught up in a series of corruption scandals. As the country's head of state, Thưởng was the second highest official in Vietnam after General Secretary Nguyễn Phú Trọng. Thưởng left many diplomatic marks during his term, including a historic meeting with Pope Francis. On 21 March 2024, he resigned after a series of his former subordinates in Quang Ngai province were arrested in a major corruption case.

== Early life and education ==
Võ Văn Thưởng was born on 13 December 1970 in Hải Dương province, North Vietnam. His family had regrouped from the South following the 1954 partition of Vietnam. In 1988, he majored in Marxist–Leninist Philosophy at the Faculty of Philosophy, University of Ho Chi Minh City. (Note: The University of Ho Chi Minh City was founded in 1976. In 1996, the university was split into the University of Natural Sciences and the University of Social Sciences and Humanities. They are currently members of Vietnam National University, Ho Chi Minh City) In 1992, he graduated with a Bachelor of Philosophy in Marxism–Leninism. After that, he pursued a master's degree in philosophy at the University of Social Sciences and Humanities, Vietnam National University, Ho Chi Minh City, and received a Master of Philosophy in 1999. On 18 November 1993, he was admitted to the Communist Party of Vietnam and became an official member on 18 November 1994. He also attended courses at the Ho Chi Minh National Academy of Politics, receiving an advanced degree in political theory.

== Career ==
=== Early career ===
==== University career ====
In 1992, the year he graduated from university, he was elected as Deputy Secretary of the Youth Union of the General University of Ho Chi Minh City. In 1993, he became the Vice Head of the Professional University Committee of the Ho Chi Minh City Youth Union. In October 1996, he was elected to the Standing Committee of Ho Chi Minh City Youth Union, and held the position of Head of the Professional University Committee of Ho Chi Minh City Youth Union.

==== Communist Youth Union ====
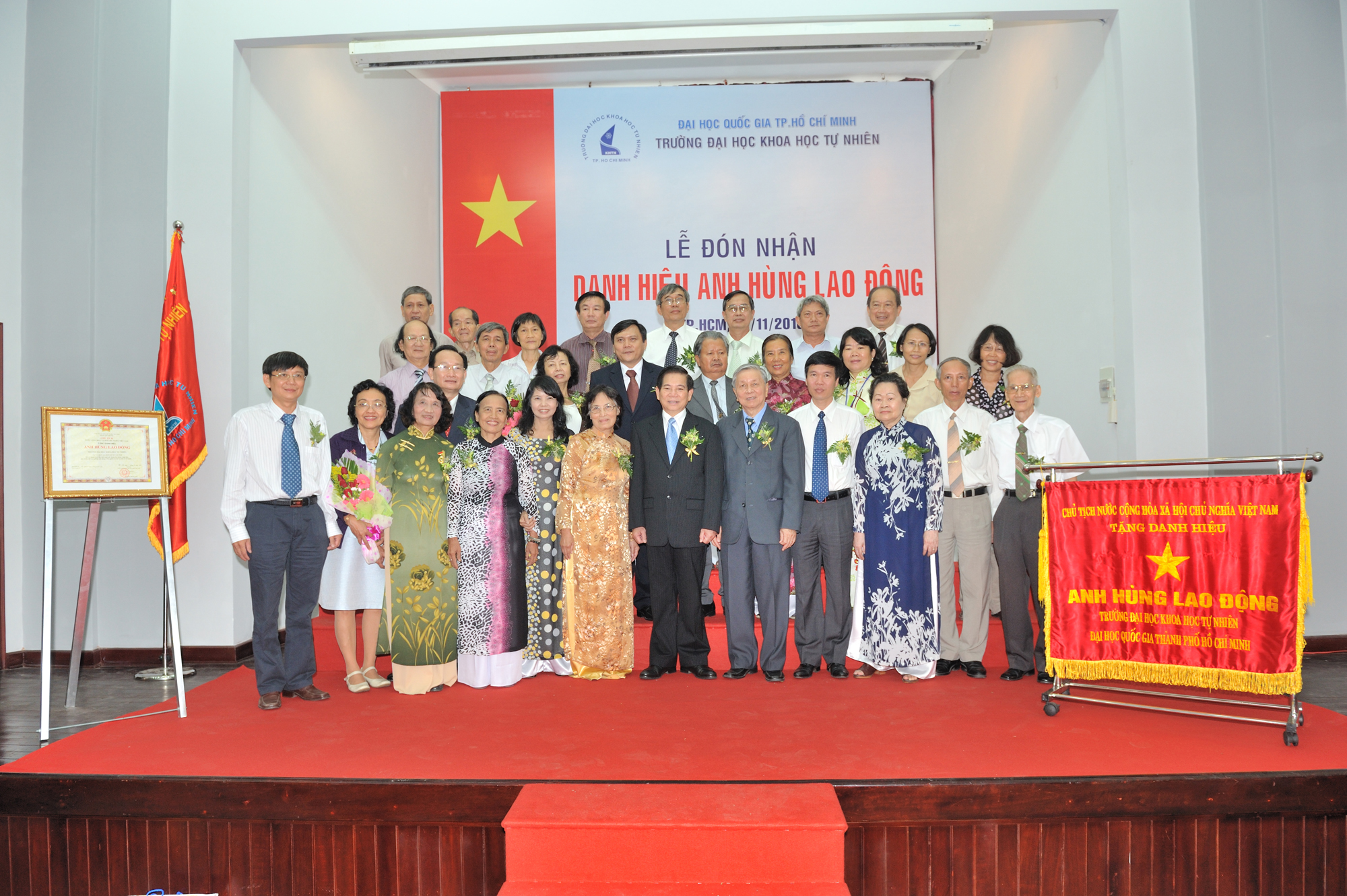
Thưởng in 2010 (in the bottom row, 4th on the right)

In October 1995, he continued to work for the Youth Union, while concurrently holding the position of Vice Chairman and General Secretary of the Ho Chi Minh City Students' Association, a newly established body, and Secretary of the Central Committee of the Vietnam Students' Association. On 26 November 1997, at the National Youth Union Congress, he was elected a member of the 7th Central Committee of the Youth Union. He was assigned to be a Party member, Secretary of the Personnel Committee of the Ho Chi Minh City National University Union. In January 2000, he became the Chairman of the Ho Chi Minh City Students' Association for the second term and was elected Vice Chairman of the Vietnam Students' Association. In May 2001, he took office as Deputy Secretary of Ho Chi Minh City Youth Union. In November 2002, he was appointed Chairman of the Ho Chi Minh City Youth Union. In March 2003, he was the Secretary of the Ho Chi Minh City Youth Federation and was elected to be a Member of the Ho Chi Minh City Party Committee from October 2003. He held this position until 2004, succeeded by Tat Thanh Cang.

From 8 to 11 December 2002, at the National Youth Union Congress in Hanoi, Võ Văn Thưởng was elected a member of the Standing Committee of the Central Committee of the Ho Chi Minh Communist Youth Union. In December 2004, Võ Văn Thưởng was appointed Secretary of the Party Committee of District 12, Ho Chi Minh City. On 24 April 2006, at the National Congress of the Communist Party of Vietnam, he was elected as an alternate member of the 10th Central Committee of the Communist Party of Vietnam. In October 2006, he was appointed by the Politburo to be the Standing Secretary of the Central Committee of the Ho Chi Minh Communist Youth Union. He was also elected as First Secretary of the Central Committee of the Ho Chi Minh Communist Youth Union, succeeding Dao Ngoc Dung in January 2007. In December 2007, he was elected as the First Secretary of the Central Committee of the Ho Chi Minh Communist Youth Union in the 9th Congress of the Youth Union, as well as the Chairman of the National Committee on Youth of Vietnam. On 29 February 2008, at the 5th Conference of the Central Committee of the Vietnam Youth Federation, Võ Văn Thưởng was elected as the 5th President of the Vietnam Youth Federation.

=== Provincial career ===
Võ Văn Thưởng was elected as a member of the 5th Ho Chi Minh City People's Council (term 1999 – 2004). In July 2007, he was elected as a member of the 12th National Assembly (2007–2011) in Vinh Long province.

On 18 January 2011, at the 11th Congress of the Communist Party of Vietnam, Võ Văn Thưởng was elected as a full member of the 11th Central Committee of the Communist Party of Vietnam (2011–2016). In August 2011, he was assigned by the Politburo to hold the position of Secretary of the Quang Ngai Provincial Party Committee.

On 15 April 2014, he became the Vice Standing Secretary of the Ho Chi Minh City Party Committee, 9th tenure (2010–2015), replacing Nguyen Van Dua, also a former Secretary of the Ho Chi Minh City Youth Union. On 17 October 2015, he was re-elected as Vice Standing Secretary of the Ho Chi Minh City Party Committee.

=== Entering national politics ===
On 26 January 2016, at the 12th National Party Congress, Võ Văn Thưởng was elected a member of the 12th Central Committee of the Communist Party of Vietnam. On 27 January 2016, he was elected to the Politburo by the 12th Central Committee, the youngest member of the 12th Politburo, at the age of 46. On 4 February 2016, he resigned from the position of Permanent Deputy Secretary of the Ho Chi Minh City Party Committee, resigned from the Standing Committee of the City Party Committee, and was instead assigned by the Politburo to become a member of the Secretariat of the Communist Party of Vietnam, and hold the position of Head of the Central Propaganda Department of the Communist Party of Vietnam. On 22 May 2016, he was elected as a member of the 14th National Assembly (2016–2021) in constituency No. 01 of Đồng Nai Province including Bien Hoa city and districts: Long Thanh, Nhon Trach, with 676,517 votes, or 68.41% of total valid votes.

==== Standing Secretaryship ====
On 30 January 2021, at the 13th National Party Congress, he was elected as a full member of the 13th Central Committee of the Communist Party of Vietnam. On 31 January, at the first plenum of the 13th Party Central Committee, he was elected to the Politburo of the 13th Central Committee of the Communist Party of Vietnam. On 6 February, he was appointed the standing secretary of the Communist Party of Vietnam Central Committee's Secretariat.

=== Introduction as President ===
At the extraordinary meeting of the Party Central Committee on 1 March 2023, he was introduced as President to succeed Nguyễn Xuân Phúc after Phúc resigned to take political responsibility due to a series of corruption scandals. After Phúc's resignation, Thưởng was considered one of the brightest candidates for the position of President.

== Presidency ==
On 2 March, the National Assembly passed a resolution to elect Võ Văn Thưởng as Vietnam's new president under CPV General Secretary Nguyễn Phú Trọng, replacing Nguyễn Xuân Phúc who resigned due to corruption scandals. He became Vietnam's youngest president since its reunification at the age of 52. On 23 April 2023, he became the President of the Vietnam Red Cross Society Thưởng is considered as a close ally of general secretary Trọng, having risen under the anti-corruption campaign pursued by Nguyễn Phú Trọng.

=== Internal ===
==== Order of the President ====
- Ordinance on Sanctions of Administrative Violations in the field of state audit.
- Order on the publication of 8 Laws passed by the 15th National Assembly at the 5th Session: Law on Prices; Civil Defense Law; Law on cooperatives; Act to protect the interests of consumers; Law amending and supplementing several articles of the Law on People's Public Security; Law on Electronic Transactions; Law on Bidding; Law amending and supplementing several articles of the law on exit and entry of Vietnamese citizens and the law on entry, exit, transit and residence of foreigners in Vietnam.

==== Opinions of the Court ====
On 27 March 2023, Võ Văn Thưởng had a working session with the leaders of Supreme People's Court. He emphasized that building a judicial procedure institution with trial centered, litigation is a breakthrough: No matter how much science and technology develops, it cannot replace bravery and brain, the heart of the judge, the people's juror during the trial, because the object of the court's trial is human"', he said. On July 14, 2023, Thưởng appointed Nguyen Hong Nam as Judge of the Supreme People's Court.

=== Foreign Affairs ===
==== 2023 ====
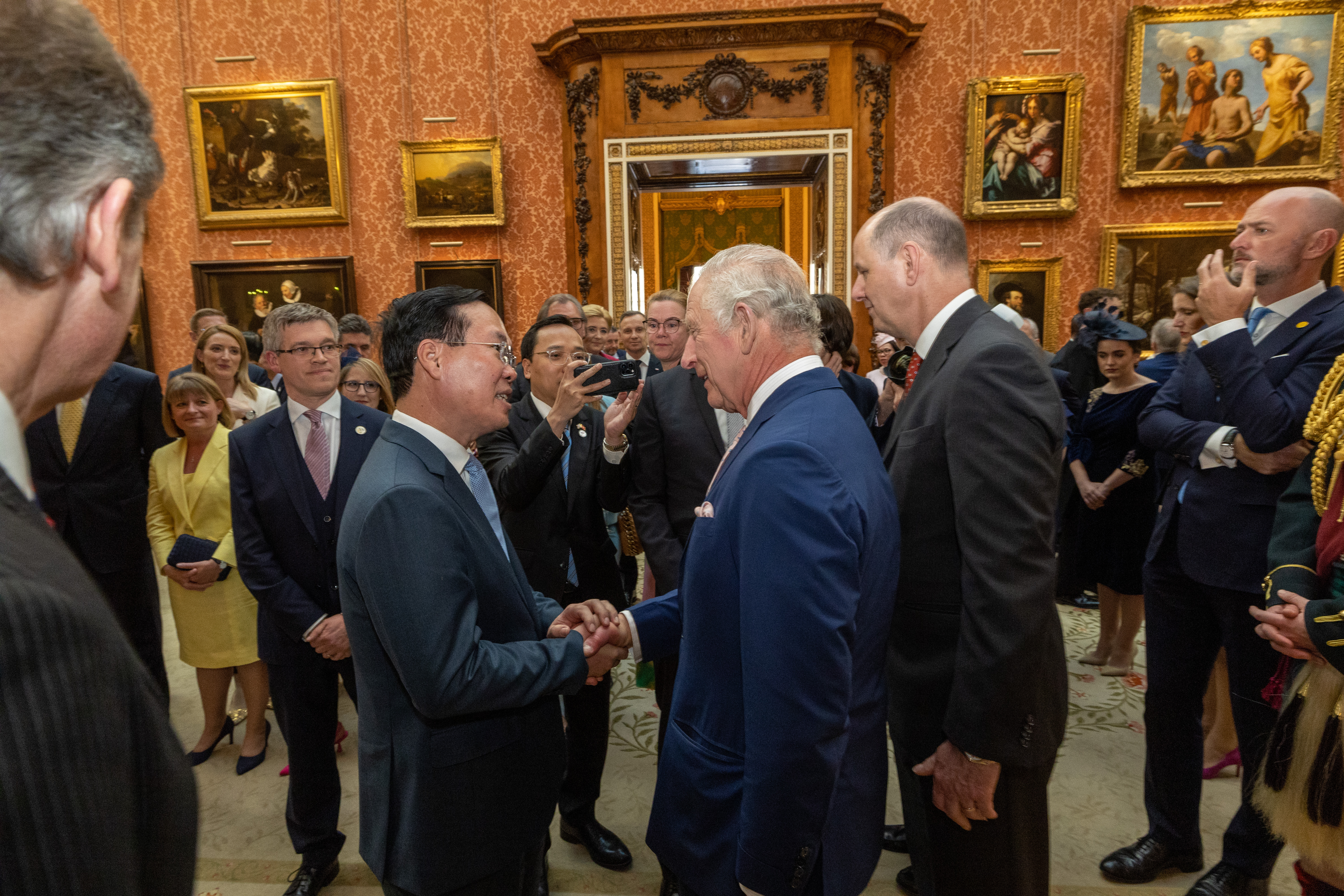
President Võ Văn Thưởng met King Charles III before the coronation

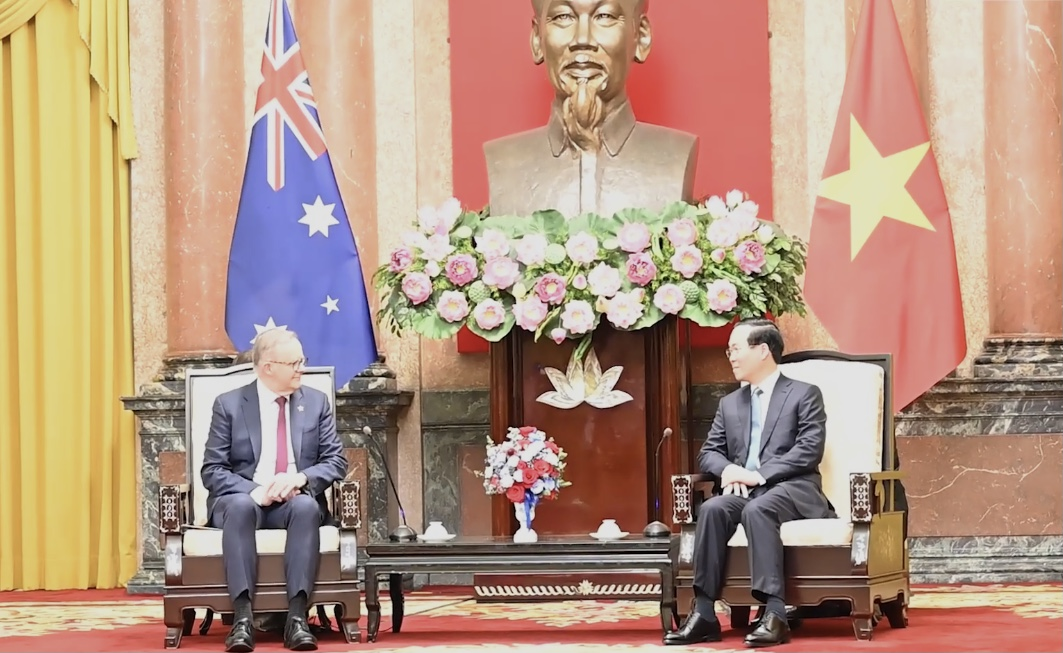
Thưởng and Prime Minister of Australia Anthony Albanese

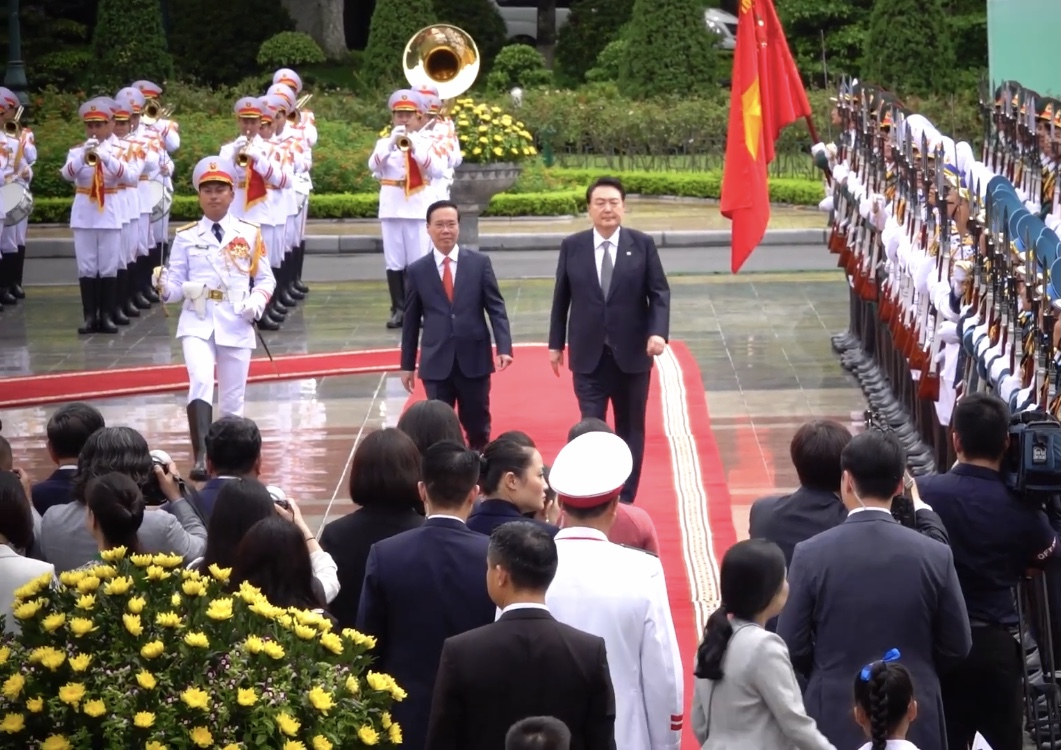
Thưởng and President of South Korea Yoon Suk-yeol

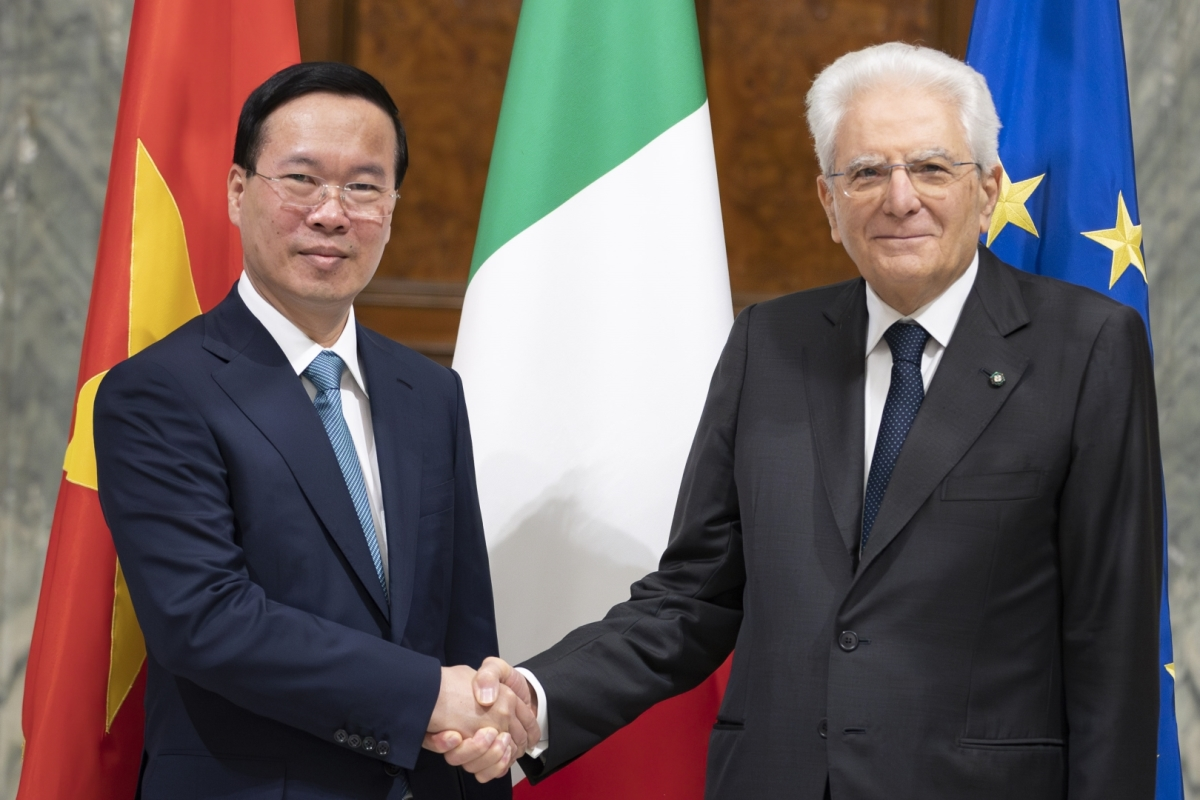
Thưởng and President of Italy Sergio Mattarella

On 3 April, Governor-General of Australia David Hurley and his wife visited Vietnam at the invitation of President Thuong, Hurley's state visit is the first by a foreign head of state to Vietnam in 2023 and the first state guest that Thưởng received as president.

On 10 April, Thuong made his first overseas visit to neighboring Laos. During his visit, Thuong met with current and former politicians of Laos, and the two countries reiterated to constantly strengthen and develop mutual trust between them.

On 4 May, Vo Van Thuong traveled to the United Kingdom to attend the Coronation of Charles III and Camilla on May 6, 2023.

On 22 June, at the invitation of President Thuong, President of South Korea Yoon Suk Yeol and his wife visited Vietnam. This is Yoon's first visit to Vietnam and Vietnam is also the first Southeast Asian country that Yoon has visited. The visit brought many special marks in the first year the two countries implemented the Comprehensive Strategic Partnership. Accompanying Yoon to visit Vietnam, there were 205 Korean businesses affirming that Vietnam is an attractive destination for foreign investment. These businesses belong to many fields such as distribution, finance, law, healthcare, information technology, and service sectors. Accompanying were the presidents of the top 5 Korean corporations including Samsung Electronics, SK, Hyundai Motor, LG and Lotte.

On 28 July, Thuong travelled to the Vatican City where he met with Pope Francis. During his meeting with the Pope, an agreement was concluded in Vietnam allowing the Holy See to install a permanent resident papal representative in the country. On 23 December 2023, Polish archbishop Marek Zalewski, who is the Apostolic Nuncio to Singapore and non-residential papal representative to Vietnam, was appointed as permanent resident papal representative to Vietnam.

On 11 September, U.S. president Joe Biden traveled to Vietnam, with the Vietnamese government upgrading the relationship between the countries to that of a Comprehensive Strategic Partnership on its 22nd anniversary of the September 11 attacks. At the meeting with Biden, President Thưởng presented a book titled “Một con người, một con đường và một lịch sử: HỒ CHÍ MINH – THƯ GỬI NƯỚC MỸ” (One person, one path and one history: Ho Chi Minh – Letters to America) published by Writers Association Publishing House. Afterwards, Thưởng attended the third Belt and Road Forum in China and the APEC Conference 2023 in the United States, where he gave a speech and met leaders of different countries and businesses.

On 23 October, Thuong attended the third Belt and Road Forum for International Cooperation in Beijing, China. At the sidelines of the forum, he met with General Secretary of the Chinese Communist Party Xi Jinping and Prime Minister of Cambodia Hun Manet.

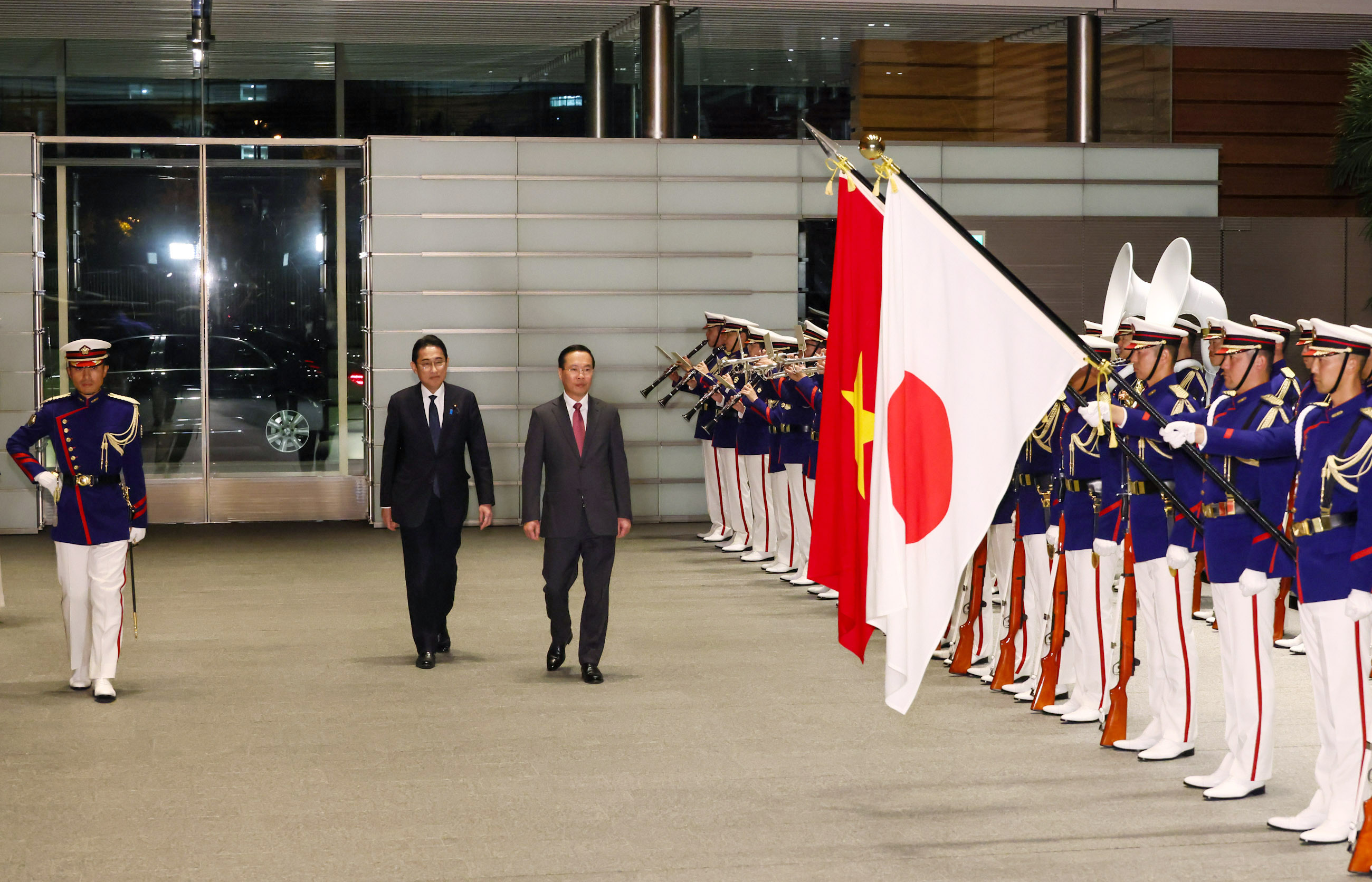
Japanese Prime Minister Kishida welcomes Mr. Thuong to Japan in November 2023

On 27 November, he made a four-day trip to Japan at the invitation of Emperor Naruhito to meet Prime Minister Fumio Kishida. The two leaders agreed to issue a Joint Statement on upgrading the two countries' relationship to a comprehensive Strategic Partnership for peace and prosperity in Asia and the world. The joint statement affirms the desire of the two countries to promote cooperation in all fields to new heights and expand into new areas of cooperation. Thereby, Japan became the 6th country to establish a comprehensive Strategic Partnership with Vietnam. The two leaders also reaffirmed their commitment to stepping up efforts to resolve remaining difficulties in the implementation of Japan's ODA projects.

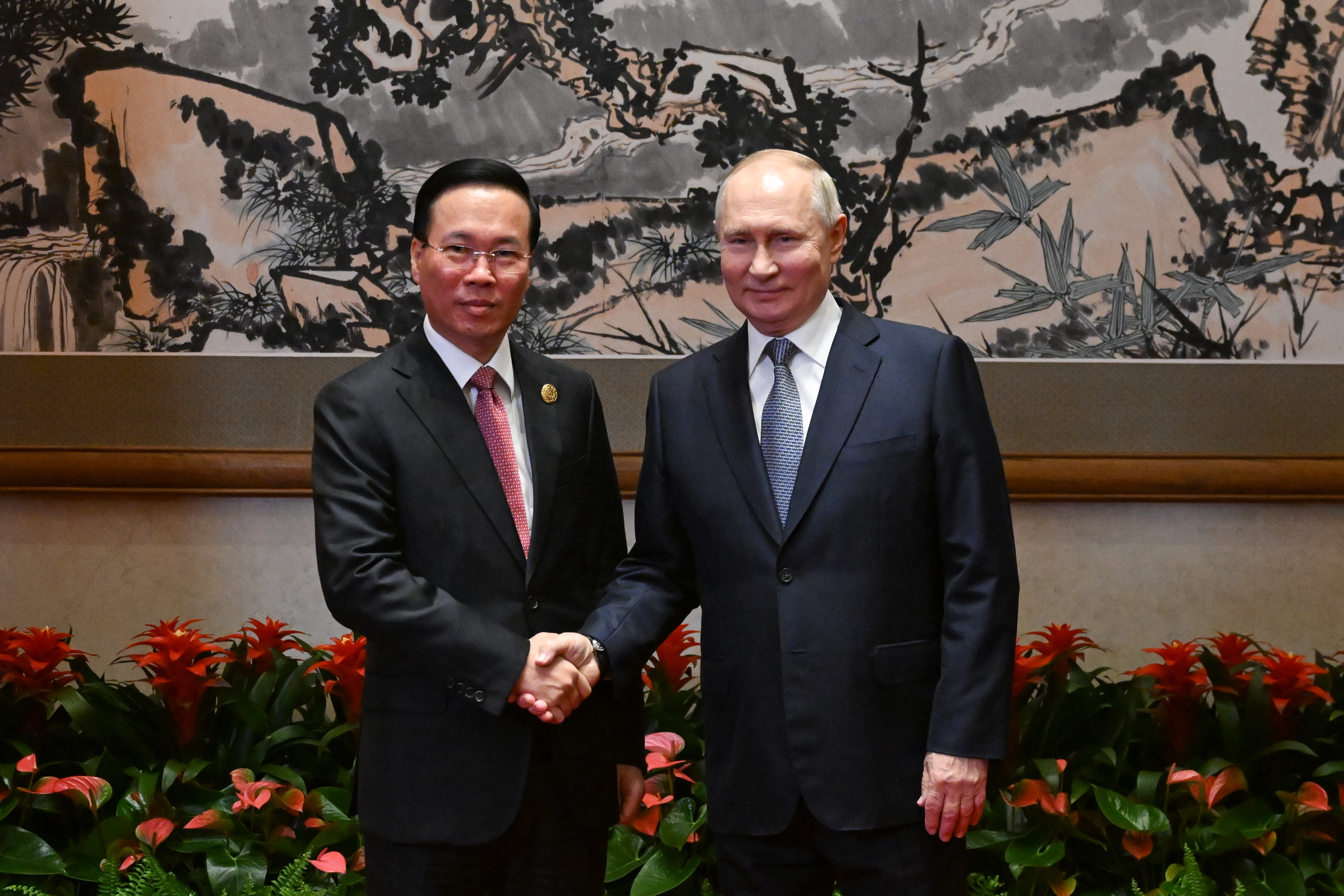
Thuong with Russian President Vladimir Putin, 17 October 2023

On 13 December 2023, Thưởng's 53rd birthday, he met again with CCP General Secretary Xi Jinping during the latter's visit to Vietnam. The two leaders emphasized the success of the talks between General Secretary Nguyễn Phú Trọng and Xi with many important common perceptions, the new positioning of Vietnam-China relations and the 6 pillars of cooperation agreed upon by the two General Secretaries. The establishment letter clearly pointed out the direction, opening up a period of good cooperation between the two Parties and two countries in the new era.

==== 2024 ====
On 23 January, German President Frank-Walter Steinmeier and his spouse arrived in Hanoi as part of their two-day state visit to Vietnam at the invitation of President Thuong and his spouse. This is the first foreign visit of the German president in 2024 and the first high-level delegation exchange between the two countries ahead of the 50th founding anniversary of bilateral diplomatic relations in 2025.

=== Resignation ===
On 20 March 2024, the Party Central Committee accepted his resignation as president, member of the Politburo and member of the Party Central Committee due to his negative reactions. The committee said that the president committed "violations" that had “left a bad mark on the reputation of the Communist Party.” He was succeeded as acting President by Võ Thị Ánh Xuân on 21 March.

== Note ==
Political offices
Preceded by Nguyễn Xuân Phúc	President of Vietnam; 2023–2024	Succeeded by Tô Lâm
