= Axel Timmermann =

German climate physicist and oceanographer

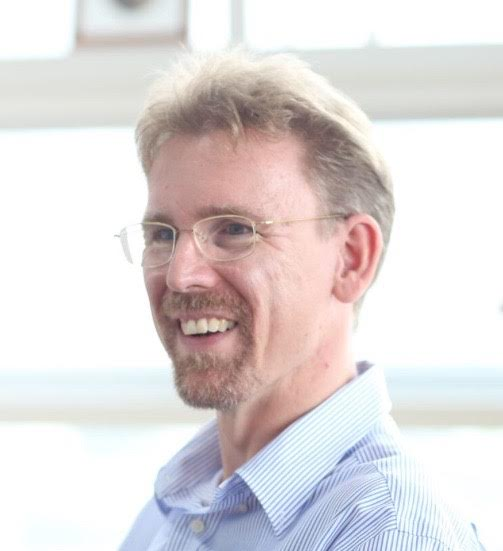
- Citizenship: Germany
- Education: University of Hamburg; Philipp University of Marburg
- Scientific career
- Fields: Climate dynamics, physical oceanography, dynamical systems' analysis, theoretical physics
- Workplaces: Institute for Basic Science; Pusan National University; University of Hawaii
- Website: IBS Center for Climate Physics

Axel Timmermann is a German climate physicist and oceanographer with an interest in climate dynamics, human migration, dynamical systems' analysis, ice-sheet modeling and sea level. He served a co-author of the IPCC Third Assessment Report and a lead author of IPCC Fifth Assessment Report. His research has been cited over 18,000 times and has an h-index of 70 and i10-index of 161. In 2017, he became a Distinguished Professor at Pusan National University and the founding Director of the Institute for Basic Science Center for Climate Physics. In December 2018, the Center began to utilize a 1.43-petaflop Cray XC50 supercomputer, named Aleph, for climate physics research.

== Education ==
He received a B.S. in physics and M.S. in theoretical physics in 1992 and 1995, respectively, from the University of Marburg in Germany. He worked as a research assistant for several years at the Max Planck Institute of Meteorology before completing a Ph.D. in meteorology in 1999 at the University of Hamburg.

== Career ==
Timmermann worked as a postdoctoral fellow in the Netherlands and Hawaii before becoming a principal investigator of the DFG Research Group at the Institut fuer Meerskunde in Kiel. In 2004 he moved to Hawaii and worked as an Associate Professor and later Full Professor in the Department of Oceanography, School of Ocean and Earth Science and Technology, University of Hawaii. In 2017, he relocated to Busan, South Korea to head up the new IBS Center for Climate Physics in Pusan University. He has been a Clarivate Analytics Highly Cited Researcher in the cross-field category in 2018, 2019, and 2023 and also environment and ecology in 2020 and 2021.

== Honors and awards ==
- 2025: Honorary Busan citizenship
- 2022: National R&D Performance Award, Ministry of Science and ICT
- 2020: Commendation for Center for Climate Physics, Ministry of Science, ICT and Future Planning
- 2018: Scientist of the Year Award, Korea Science Journalists Association
- 2017: Milutin Milankovic Medal of the European Geosciences Union
- 2015: Elected Fellow of the American Geophysical Union
- 2015: University of Hawaii, Regents' Medal for Excellence in Research
- 2007: Rosenstiel Award of the Rosenstiel School of Marine, Atmospheric, and Earth Science (RSMAS), Miami
- 2006: Rosenstiel Award for Outstanding Achievement and Distinction in Oceanographic Science, University of Miami Rosenstiel School of Marine & Atmospheric Science, Florida

== Publications ==
1. Karamperidou, Christina; Stuecker, Malte F.; Timmermann, Axel; Yun, Kyung-Sook; Lee, Sun-Seon; Jin, Fei-Fei; Santoso, Agus; McPhaden, Michael J.; Cai, Wenju (4 November 2020). "ENSO in a Changing Climate: Challenges, Paleo-Perspectives, and Outlook". El Niño Southern Oscillation in a Changing Climate. Geophysical Monograph Series. pp. 471–484. doi:10.1002/9781119548164.ch21. hdl:1959.4/unsworks_73141. ISBN 978-1-119-54812-6. S2CID 226353817.
2. ENSO Response to Greenhouse Forcing, Wenju Cai, Agus Santoso, Guojian Wang, Lixin Wu, Mat Collins, Matthieu Lengaigne, Scott Power, Axel Timmermann, El Niño Southern Oscillation in a Changing Climate 253, 289, ISBN 978-1-119-54812-6, doi: 10.1002/9781119548164.ch13, 2020
3. A low order dynamical model for runoff predictability, Roman Olson, Axel Timmermann, June-Yi Lee, Soon-Il An, Climate Dynamics, doi: 10.1007/s00382-020-05479-w, 2020
4. Fokker–Planck dynamics of the El Niño-Southern Oscillation, Soon-Il An, Soong-Ki Kim, Axel Timmermann, Scientific Reports, 10, 16283, doi: 10.1038/s41598-020-73449-7, 2020
5. Atmospheric nitrous oxide variations on centennial time scales during the past two millennia, Y. Ryu, J. Ahn, J.-W. Yang, E. J. Brook, A. Timmermann, T. Blunier, S. Hur, S.-J. Kim, Global Biogeochemical Cycles, 34(9), e2020GB006568, doi: 10.1029/2020GB006568, 2020
6. Simulating Marine Isotope Stage 7 with a coupled climate-ice sheet model, Dipayan Choudhury, Axel Timmermann, Fabian Schloesser, Malte Heinemann, David Pollard, Climate of the Past, doi: 10.5194/cp-2020-46, 2020
7. Gallego, M. Angeles; Timmermann, Axel; Friedrich, Tobias; Zeebe, Richard E. (16 July 2020). "Anthropogenic Intensification of Surface Ocean Interannual pCO 2 Variability". Geophysical Research Letters. 47 (13). doi:10.1029/2020GL087104. S2CID 219518685.
8. Quantifying the potential causes of Neanderthal extinction: abrupt climate change versus competition and interbreeding, Axel Timmermann, Quaternary Science Reviews, doi: 10.1016/j.quascirev.2020.106331, 2020
9. Future changes of summer monsoon characteristics and evaporative demand over Asia in CMIP6 simulations, Kyung-Ja Ha, Suyeon Moon, Axel Timmermann, Daeha Kim, Geophysical Research Letters, 47 (8), e2020GL087492, doi: 10.1029/2020GL087492, 2020
10. Stein, Karl; Timmermann, Axel; Kwon, Eun Young; Friedrich, Tobias (3 March 2020). "Timing and magnitude of Southern Ocean sea ice/carbon cycle feedbacks". Proceedings of the National Academy of Sciences. 117 (9): 4498–4504. Bibcode:2020PNAS..117.4498S. doi:10.1073/pnas.1908670117. PMC 7060729. PMID 32071218.
11. Friedrich, Tobias; Timmermann, Axel (January 2020). "Using Late Pleistocene sea surface temperature reconstructions to constrain future greenhouse warming". Earth and Planetary Science Letters. 530 115911. Bibcode:2020E&PSL.53015911F. doi:10.1016/j.epsl.2019.115911.
12. Stuecker, Malte F.; Timmermann, Axel; Jin, Fei-Fei; Proistosescu, Cristian; Kang, Sarah M.; Kim, Doyeon; Yun, Kyung-Sook; Chung, Eui-Seok; Chu, Jung-Eun; Bitz, Cecilia M.; Armour, Kyle C.; Hayashi, Michiya (February 2020). "Strong remote control of future equatorial warming by off-equatorial forcing". Nature Climate Change. 10 (2): 124–129. Bibcode:2020NatCC..10..124S. doi:10.1038/s41558-019-0667-6. S2CID 210166454.
13. Saltré, Frédérik; Chadoeuf, Joël; Peters, Katharina J.; McDowell, Matthew C.; Friedrich, Tobias; Timmermann, Axel; Ulm, Sean; Bradshaw, Corey J. A. (22 November 2019). "Climate-human interaction associated with southeast Australian megafauna extinction patterns". Nature Communications. 10 (1): 5311. Bibcode:2019NatCo..10.5311S. doi:10.1038/s41467-019-13277-0. PMC 6876570. PMID 31757942.
14. Chan, Eva K. F.; Timmermann, Axel; Baldi, Benedetta F.; Moore, Andy E.; Lyons, Ruth J.; Lee, Sun-Seon; Kalsbeek, Anton M. F.; Petersen, Desiree C.; Rautenbach, Hannes; Förtsch, Hagen E. A.; Bornman, M. S. Riana; Hayes, Vanessa M. (7 November 2019). "Human origins in a southern African palaeo-wetland and first migrations". Nature. 575 (7781): 185–189. Bibcode:2019Natur.575..185C. doi:10.1038/s41586-019-1714-1. PMID 31659339. S2CID 204946938.
15. Nonlinear response of the Antarctic Ice Sheet to late Quaternary sea level and climate forcing, Michelle Tigchelaar, Axel Timmermann, Tobias Friedrich, Malte Heinemann, David Pollard, The Cryosphere, doi: 10.5194/tc-13-2615-2019, 2019
16. Mediterranean winter rainfall in phase with African monsoons during the past 1.36 million years, Bernd Wagner, Hendrik Vogel, Alexander Francke, Tobias Friedrich, Timme Donders, Jack H. Lacey, Melanie J. Leng, Eleonora Regattieri, Laura Sadori, Thomas Wilke, Giovanni Zanchetta, Christian Albrecht, Adele Bertini, Nathalie Combourieu-Nebout, Aleksandra Cvetkoska, Biagio Giaccio, Andon Grazhdani, Torsten Hauffe, Jens Holtvoeth, Sebastien Joannin, Elena Jovanovska, Janna Just, Katerina Kouli, Ilias Kousis, Andreas Koutsodendris, Sebastian Krastel, Markus Lagos, Niklas Leicher, Zlatko Levkov, Katja Lindhorst, Alessia Masi, Martin Melles, Anna M. Mercuri, Sebastien Nomade, Norbert Nowaczyk, Konstantinos Panagiotopoulos, Odile Peyron, Jane M. Reed, Leonardo Sagnotti, Gaia Sinopoli, Björn Stelbrink, Roberto Sulpizio, Axel Timmermann, Slavica Tofilovska, Paola Torri, Friederike Wagner-Cremer, Thomas Wonik, Xiaosen Zhang, Nature, 573 (7773), 256-260, doi: 10.1038/s41586-019-1529-0, 2019
17. Drivers of Late Pleistocene human survival and dispersal: an agent-based modeling and machine learning approach, Ali R. Vahdati, John David Weissmann, Axel Timmermann, Marcia S.Ponce de León, Christoph P.E.Zollikofer, Quaternary Science Reviews, 221, doi: 10.1016/j.quascirev.2019.105867, 2019
18. North American April tornado occurrences linked to global sea surface temperature anomalies, Jung-Eun Chu, Axel Timmermann, June-Yi Lee, Science Advances, doi: 10.1126/sciadv.aaw9950, 2019
19. Antarctic iceberg impacts on future Southern Hemisphere Climate, Fabian Schloesser, Tobias Friedrich, Axel Timmermann, Robert M. DeConto, David Pollard, Nature Climate Change, 9(9), 672-677, doi: 10.1038/s41558-019-0546-1, 2019
20. A drift-free decadal climate prediction system for the Community Earth System Model, Yoshimitsu Chikamoto, Axel Timmermann, Matthew J. Widlansky, Shaoqing Zhang, Magdalena A. Balmaseda, Journal of Climate, doi: 10.1175/JCLI-D-18-0788.1, 2019
21. Saharan green corridors and Middle Pleistocene hominin dispersals across the Eastern Desert, Sudan, M. Masojć, A. Nassr, J. Y. Kim, J. Krupa-Kurzynowska, Y. K. Sohn, M. Szmit, J. C. Kim, J. S. Kim, H. W. Choi, M. Wieczorek, A. Timmermann, Journal of Human Evolution, 130, 141-150, doi: 10.1016/j.jhevol.2019.01.004, 2019
22. Calibration uncertainties of tropical Pacific climate reconstructions over the Last Millennium, K.-S. Yun, A. Timmermann, Journal of Climate, doi: 10.1175/JCLI-D-18-0524.1, 2019
23. Reconciling opposing Walker circulation trends in observations and model projections, E.-S. Chung, A. Timmermann, B. J. Soden, K.-J. Ha, L, Shi, V, O. John, Nature Climate Change, doi: 10.1038/s41558-019-0446-4, 2019
24. Sea ice variability in the southern Norwegian Sea during glacial Dansgaard-Oeschger climate cycles, H. Sadatzki, T. M. Dokken, S. M. P. Berben, F. Muschitiello, R. Stein, K. Fahl, L. Menviel, A. Timmermann, E. Jansen, Science Advances, 5(3), doi:10.1126/sciadv.aau6174, 2019
25. Glacial changes in tropical climate amplified by the Indian Ocean, P. N. DiNezio, J. E. Tierney, B. L. Otto-Bliesner, A. Timmermann, T. Bhattacharya, N. Rosenbloom, E. Brady, Science Advances, 4(12), doi: 10.1126/sciadv.aat9658, 2018
26. Drivers of future seasonal cycle changes in oceanic pCO2, M. A Gallego, A Timmermann, T Friedrich, R E. Zeebe, Biogeosciences, 15, 5315-5327, doi: 10.5194/bg-15-5315-2018, 2018
27. Disentangling Impacts of Dynamic and Thermodynamic Components on Late Summer Rainfall Anomalies in East Asia, H Oh, K.-J Ha, A Timmermann, Journal of Geophysical Research: Atmospheres, 0(0), 1-11, doi: 10.1029/2018JD028652, 2018
28. El Niño–Southern Oscillation complexity, A Timmermann, S-I An, J-S Kug, F-F Jin, W Cai, A Capotondi, K Cobb, M Lengaigne, M J. McPhaden, M F. Stuecker, K Stein, A T. Wittenberg, K-S Yun, T Bayr, H-C Chen, Y Chikamoto, B Dewitte, D Dommenget, P Grothe, E Guilyardi, Y-G Ham, M Hayashi, S Ineson, D Kang, S Kim, WM Kim, J-Y Lee, T Li, J-J Luo, S McGregor, Y Planton, S Power, H Rashid, H-L Ren, A Santoso, K Takahashi, A Todd, G Wang, G Wang, R Xie, W-H Yang, S-W Yeh, J Yoon, E Zeller, X Zhang, Nature, 559, 535-545, doi: 10.1038/s41586-018-0252-6, 2018
29. Did our species evolve in subdivided populations across Africa, and why does it matter?, E M.L. Scerri, M G. Thomas, A Manica, P Gunz, J T. Stock, C Stringer, M Grove, H S. Groucutt, A Timmermann, G. P Rightmire, F d'Errico, C A. Tryon, N A. Drake, A S. Brooks, R W. Dennell, R W. Dennell, R Durbin, B M. Henn, J L-Thorp, P deMenocal, M D. Petraglia, J C. Thompson, A Scally, L Chikhi, Trends in Ecology and Evolution, doi: 10.1016/j.tree.2018.05.005, 2018
30. Local insolation changes enhance Antarctic interglacials: Insights from an 800,000-year ice sheet simulation with transient climate forcing, M Tigchelaar, A Timmermann, D Pollard, T Friedrich, M Heinemann, Earth and Planetary Science Letters, 495, 69-78, doi: 10.1016/j.epsl.2018.05.004, 2018
31. Precession and atmospheric CO2 modulated variability of sea ice in the central Okhotsk Sea since 130,000 years ago, L Lo, S T. Belt, J Lattaud, T Friedrich, C Zeeden, S Schouten, L Smik, A Timmermann, P Cabedo-Sanz, J-J Huang, L Zhou, T-H Ou, Y-P Chang, L-C Wang, Y-M Chou, C-C Shen, M-T Chen, K-Y Wei, S-R Song, T-H Fang, S A. Gorbarenko, W-L Wang, T-Q Lee, H Elderfield, D A. Hodell, Earth and Planetary Science Letters, doi: 10.1016/j.epsl.2018.02.005, 2018
32. Decadal Monsoon-ENSO relationships re-examined, KS Yun, A Timmermann, Geophysical Research Letters, 45 (4), doi: 10.1002/2017GL076912, 2018
33. (Un)predictability of strong El Niño events, J Guckenheimer, A Timmermann, H Dijkstra, A Roberts, Dynamics and Statistics of the Climate System, doi: 10.1093/climsys/dzx004, 2017
34. Multi-year predictability of climate, drought, and wildfire in southwestern North America, Y Chikamoto, A Timmermann, M Widlansky, MA Balmaseda, L Stott, Scientific Reports, 7, 6568, doi: 10.1038/s41598-017-06869-7, 2017
35. Revisiting ENSO/Indian Ocean Dipole phase relationships, M Stuecker, A Timmermann, FF Jin, Y Chikamoto, W Zhang, Geophysical Research Letters, 44, doi: 10.1002/2016GL072308, 2017
36. Nonlinear climate sensitivity and its implications for future greenhouse warming, T Friedrich, A Timmermann, M Tigchelaar, O Elison Timm, A Ganopolski, Science Advances, 2 (11), doi: 10.1126/sciadv.1501923, 2016
37. Unraveling El Niño's impact on the East Asian Monsoon and Yangtze River summer flooding, W Zhang, FF Jin, MF Stuecker, AT Wittenberg, A Timmermann, HL Ren, Geophysical Research Letters, 43 (21), doi 10.1002/2016GL071190, 2016
38. Tropical Pacific SST drivers of recent Antarctic sea ice trends, A Purich, M England, W Cai, Y Chikamoto, A Timmermann, J Fyfe, Journal of Climate, doi: 10.1175 JCLI-D-16, 2016
39. Strong middepth warming and weak radiocarbon imprints in the equatorial Atlantic during Heinrich 1 and Younger Dryas, S Weldeab, T Friedrich, A Timmermann, R Schneider Paleoceanography 31, doi: 10.1002/2016PA002957, 2016
40. Potential tropical Atlantic impacts on Pacific decadal climate trends, Y Chikamoto, T Mochizuki, A Timmermann, M Kimoto, M Watanabe, Geophysical Research Letters 43, 10.1002/2016GL069544, 2016
41. The climate response of the Indo-Pacific warm pool to glacial sea level, PN Di Nezio, A Timmermann, JE Tierney, FF Jin, B Otto-Bliesner, Paleoceanography, doi: 10.1002/2015PA002890, 2016
42. Reply to "Comments on Combination Mode Dynamics of the Anomalous Northwest Pacific Anticyclone", MF Stuecker, FF Jin, A Timmermann, S McGregor J. Climate, doi: 10.1175/JCLI-D-15-0558, 2016
43. Late Pleistocene climate drivers of early human migration A Timmermann, To. Friedrich, Nature, 538 (92-95), doi: 10.1038/nature19365, 2016
44. Mixed-Mode Oscillations of El Niño–Southern Oscillation A Roberts, J Guckenheimer, E Widiasih, A Timmermann, CKRT Jones Journal of the Atmospheric Sciences 73, 1755-1766, 2016
45. Volcanic eruptions boost tropical Pacific biological productivity MO Chikamoto, A Timmermann, M Yoshimori, L F., A Laurian, Geophysical Research Letter 43, 10.1002/2015GL067359, 2016
46. Millennial to orbital-scale variations of drought intensity in the Eastern Mediterranean M Stockhecke, A Timmermann, R Kipfer, GH Haug, O Kwiecien Quaternary Science Reviews 133, 77-95, 2016
47. Charging El Niño with off-equatorial westerly wind events S McGregor, A Timmermann, FF Jin, WS Kessler Climate Dynamics 45, doi: 10.1007/s00382-015-2891-8, 2015
48. The El Nino-Southern Oscillation frequency cascade, MF Stuecker F -F Jin, and A Timmermann, Proceedings of the National Academy of Sciences, 112, doi:10.1073/pnas.1508622112 2015
49. Abrupt onset and prolongation of aragonite undersaturation events in the Southern Ocean, C Hauri, T Friedrich, A Timmermann, Nature Climate Change, 5, doi:10.1038/NCLIMATE2844, 2015
50. Future extreme sea level seesaws in the tropical Pacific, M Widlansky, A Timmermann, W Cai, Science Advances, 1 (8), doi:10.1126/sciadv.1500560, 2015
51. An Atlantic-Pacific ventilation seesaw across the last deglaciation, E Freeman, LC Skinner, A Tisserand, T Dokken, A Timmermann, Earth and Planetary Science Letters 424, 237-244, 2015
52. Skilful multi-year predictions of tropical trans-basin climate variability, Y Chikamoto, A Timmermann, JJ Luo, T Mochizuki, M Kimoto, Nature Communications, doi: 10.1038/ncomms7869, 2015
53. The response of ENSO flavors to mid-Holocene climate: Implications for proxy interpretation, C Karamperidou, PM Di Nezio, A Timmermann, FF Jin, KM Cobb, Paleoceanography, 30, doi, 10.1002/2014PA002742, 2015
54. Combination Mode Dynamics of the Anomalous Northwest Pacific Anticyclone, MF Stuecker, FF Jin, A Timmermann, S McGregor, Journal of Climate 28 (3), 1093-1111, 3, 2015
55. Decadal predictability of soil water, vegetation, and wildfire frequency over North America, Y Chikamoto, A Timmermann, S Stevenson, P DiNezio, S Langford, Climate Dynamics, 5, doi: 10.1007/s00382-015-2469-5, 2015
56. Abrupt changes in the southern extent of North Atlantic DeepWater during Dansgaard-Oeschger events, J Gottschalk, LC Skinner, S Misra, C Waelbroeck, L Menviel, A. Timmermann, Nature Geoscience, doi:10.1038/ngeo2558, 2015
57. Mechanisms rectifying the annual mean response of tropical Atlantic rainfall to precessional forcing, M Tigchelaar, A Timmermann, Climate Dynamics, doi: 10.1007/s00382-015-2835-3, 2015
58. Tropospheric Biennial Oscillation (TBO) indistinguishable from white noise, M Stuecker, A Timmermann, J Yoon, FF Jin, Geophysical Research Letters, doi:10.1002/2015GL065878, 2015
59. ENSO and greenhouse warming, Wenju Cai, Agus Santoso, Guojian Wang, Sang-Wook Yeh, Soon-Il An, Kim M. Cobb, Mat Collins, Eric Guilyardi, Fei-Fei Jin, Jong-Seong Kug, Matthieu Lengaigne, Michael J. McPhaden, Ken Takahashi, Axel Timmermann, Gabriel Vecchi, Masahiro Watanabe, Lixin Wu, Nature Climate Change 5, 849-859, 2015
60. Increased frequency of extreme La Niña events under greenhouse warming, W Cai, G Wang, A Santoso, MJ McPhaden, L Wu, FF Jin, A Timmermann, M Collins, G Vecchi, M Lengaigne, MH England, D Dommenget, K Takahashi and E Guilyardi, Nature Climate Change, doi: 10.1038/NCLIMATE2492, 2014
61. The Holocene temperature conundrum, Z Liu, J Zhu, Y Rosenthal, X Zhang, BL Otto-Bliesner, A Timmermann, Proceedings of the National Academy of Sciences 111 (34), E3501-E3505, 2014
62. Evolution and Forcing Mechanisms of El Niño over the Last 21,000, Z Liu, Z Lu, X Wen, BL Otto-Bliesner, A Timmermann, K. M. Cobb, Nature, 515, 550-553, 2014.
63. Millennial-scale Atlantic/East Pacific sea surface temperature linkages during the last 100,000 years, N Dubois, M Kienast, SS Kienast, A Timmermann, Earth and Planetary Science Letters 396, 134-142, 2014
64. Assessing divergent SST behavior during the last 21 ka derived from alkenones and G. ruber Mg/Ca in the Equatorial Pacific, A Timmermann, J Sachs, O Elison Timm, Paleoceanography, DOI: 10.1002/2013PA002598, 2014
65. Millennial-scale variability in Antarctic ice-sheet discharge during the last deglaciation, ME Weber, PU Clark, G Kuhn, A Timmermann, D Sprenk, R Gladstone, Nature 510, 134-138, 2014
66. The role of soil processes in δ18O terrestrial climate proxies, LC Kanner, NH Buenning, LD Stott, A Timmermann, D Noone, Global Biogeochemical Cycles 28 (3), 239-252, 2014
67. Recent intensification of wind-driven circulation in the Pacific and the ongoing warming hiatus, MH England, S McGregor, P Spence, GA Meehl, A Timmermann, W Cai, Nature Climate Change 4 (3), 222-227, 2014
68. Modeling Obliquity and CO2 Effects on Southern Hemisphere Climate during the Past 408 ka, A Timmermann, T Friedrich, OE Timm, MO Chikamoto, A Abe-Ouchi, Journal of Climate 27 (5), 1863-1875, 2014
69. CO2 radiative forcing and Intertropical Convergence Zone influences on western Pacific warm pool climate over the past 400 ka, K Tachikawa, A Timmermann, L Vidal, C Sonzogni, OE Timm, Quaternary Science Reviews 86, 24-34, 2014
70. Using palaeo-climate comparisons to constrain future projections in CMIP5, GA Schmidt, JD Annan, PJ Bartlein, BI Cook, E Guilyardi, JC Hargreaves, SP Harrison, M Kageyama, AN LeGrande, B Konecky, S Lovejoy, ME Mann, V Masson-Delmotte, C Risi, D Thompson, A Timmermann, LB Tremblay, and P Yiou, Climate of the Past 10 (1), 221-250, 2014
71. Deglacial ice/sheet meltdown: orbital pacemaking and CO2 effects, M Heinemann, A Timmermann, OE Timm, F Saito, A Abe-Ouchi, Climate of the Past 10, 1567–1579, 2014
72. An interhemispheric tropical sea level seesaw due to El Niño Taimasa, MJ Widlansky, A Timmermann, S McGregor, MF Stuecker, W Cai, Journal of Climate 27 (3), 1070-1081, 2014
73. Dynamics of the Atlantic meridional overturning circulation. Part 2: Forcing by winds and buoyancy, F Schloesser, R Furue, JP McCreary, A Timmermann, Progress in Oceanography 120, 154-176, 2014
74. Increasing frequency of extreme El Niño events due to greenhouse warming, W Cai, S Borlace, M Lengaigne, P Van Rensch, M Collins, G Vecchi, A Timmermann, Nature Climate Change 4, 111-116, 2014
75. Hindcasting the continuum of Dansgaard/Oeschger variability: mechanisms, patterns and timing, L Menviel, A Timmermann, T Friedrich, MH England, Climate of the Past 10 (1), 63-77, 2014
76. Recent Walker circulation strengthening and Pacific cooling amplified by Atlantic warming, S McGregor, A Timmermann, MF Stuecker, MH England, M Merrifield, Nature Climate Change 4, doi:10.1038/nclimate2330, 2014
77. ENSO seasonal synchronization theory, K Stein, A Timmermann, N Schneider, FF Jin, MF Stuecker, Journal of Climate, 27, 5285–5310, 2014
78. Improved Representation of Tropical Pacific Ocean/Atmosphere Dynamics in an Intermediate Complexity Climate Model, RL Sriver, A Timmermann, ME Mann, K Keller, H Goosse, Journal of Climate 27 (1), 168-185, 2014
79. Near collapse of the meridional SST gradient in the eastern equatorial Pacific during Heinrich Stadial 1, SS Kienast, T Friedrich, N Dubois, PS Hill, A Timmermann, AC Mix, Paleoceanography 28 (4), 663-674, 2013
80. Zonal phase propagation of ENSO sea surface temperature anomalies: Revisited, J Boucharel, A Timmermann, FF Jin Geophysical Research Letters 40 (15), 4048-4053, 2013
81. Information from paleoclimate archives. In Climate Change 2013: The Physical Science Basis. Contribution of Working Group I to the Fifth Assessment Report of the Intergovernmental Panel on Climate Change, V Masson-Delmotte, M Schulz, A Abe-Ouchi, J Beer, A Ganopolski, JF González Rouco, E Jansen, K Lambeck, J Luterbacher, T Naish, T Osborn, B Otto-Bliesner, T Quinn, R Ramesh, M Rojas, X Shao, and A Timmermann, 2013:. T.F. Stocker, D. Qin, G.-K. Plattner, M. Tignor, S.K. Allen, J. Doschung, A. Nauels, Y. Xia, V. Bex, and P.M. Midgley, Eds. Cambridge University Press, 383-464, doi::10.1017/CBO9781107415324.013.
82. Inferred changes in El Niño-Southern Oscillation variance over the past six centuries, S McGregor, A Timmermann, MH England, O Elison Timm, AT Wittenberg, Climate of the Past 9 2269-2284, 2013.
83. A combination mode of the annual cycle and the El Niño/Southern Oscillation, MF Stuecker, A Timmermann, FF Jin, S McGregor, HL Ren, Nature Geoscience, 6, 540–544, 2013
84. 37. Estimated strength of the Atlantic overturning circulation during the last deglaciation, SP Ritz, TF Stocker, JO Grimalt, L Menviel, A Timmermann, Nature Geoscience, 6, 208–212, 2013
85. Links between tropical rainfall and North Atlantic climate during the last glacial period, G Deplazes, A Lueckge, LC Peterson, A Timmermann, Y Hamann, KA Hughen, Nature Geoscience, 6, 213–217,2013
86. Changes in South Pacific rainfall bands in a warming climate, MJ Widlansky, A Timmermann, K Stein, S McGregor, N Schneider, MH England, Nature Climate Change, 3, 417–423, 2012
87. Millennial-scale glacial meltwater pulses and their effect on the spatiotemporal benthic d18O variability, T Friedrich, A Timmermann, Paleoceanography 27 (3), doi: 10.1029/2012PA002330, 2012
88. Dynamics of the Atlantic meridional overturning circulation. Part 1: Buoyancy-forced response, F Schloesser, R Furue, JP McCreary Jr, A Timmermann, Progress in Oceanography 101 (1), 33-62, 2012
89. More extreme swings of the South Pacific convergence zone due to greenhouse warming, W Cai, M Lengaigne, S Borlace, M Collins, T Cowan, MJ McPhaden, A Timmermann, Nature 488 (7411), 365-369, 2012
90. The Effect of the South Pacific Convergence Zone on the Termination of El Niño Events and the Meridional Asymmetry of ENSO, S McGregor, A Timmermann, N Schneider, MF Stuecker, MH England, Journal of Climate 25 (16), 5566-5586, 2012
91. Role of the Bering Strait on the hysteresis of the ocean conveyor belt circulation and glacial climate stability, A Hu, GA Meehl, W Han, A Timmermann, B Otto-Bliesner, Z Liu, WM Washington, Proceedings of the National Academy of Sciences 109 (17), 6417-6422, 2012
92. Climate change dynamics of present and past in the North Pacific and its northern marginal seas, N Harada, K Takahashi, A Timmermann, T Sakamoto, Deep Sea Research Part II: Topical Studies in Oceanography 61, 1-3, 2012
93. Sea surface temperature changes in the Okhotsk Sea and adjacent North Pacific during the last glacial maximum and deglaciation, N Harada, M Sato, O Seki, A Timmermann, H Moossen, J Bendle, Y Nakamura, K, Deep Sea Research Part II: Topical Studies in Oceanography 61, 93-105, 2012
94. Variability in North Pacific intermediate and deep water ventilation during Heinrich events in two coupled climate models, MO Chikamoto, L Menviel, A Abe-Ouchi, R Ohgaito, A Timmermann, Y Okazaki, N, Deep Sea Research Part II: Topical Studies in Oceanography 61, 114-126, 2012
95. Removing the North Pacific halocline: effects on global climate, ocean circulation and the carbon cycle, L Menviel, A Timmermann, O Elison Timm, A Mouchet, A Abe-Ouchi, MO Chikamoto, Deep Sea Research Part II: Topical Studies in Oceanography 61, 106-113, 2012
96. Quantifying the ocean's role in glacial CO2 reductions, MO Chikamoto, A Abe-Ouchi, A Oka, R Ohgaito, A Timmermann, Climate of the Past 8 (2), 545-563, 2012
97. Regional Patterns of Tropical Indo-Pacific Climate Change: Evidence of the Walker Circulation Weakening, H Tokinaga, SP Xie, A Timmermann, S McGregor, T Ogata, H Kubota, YM Okumura, Journal of Climate 25 (5), 1689-1710, 2012
98. Enhanced warming over the global subtropical western boundary currents, L Wu, W Cai, L Zhang, H Nakamura, A Timmermann, T Joyce, MJ McPhaden, M Nature Climate Change 2 (3), 161-166, 2012
99. Detecting regional anthropogenic trends in ocean acidification against natural variability, T Friedrich, A Timmermann, A Abe-Ouchi, NR Bates, MO Chikamoto, MJ Church, Nature Climate Change 2 (3), 167-171, 2012
100. Impacts of ocean gateway and basin width on tertiary tropical climate variability in a prototype model, SI An, JH Park, BM Kim, A Timmermann, FF Jin, Theoretical and Applied Climatology 107 (1-2), 155-164, 2012
101. The effect of topography-enhanced diapycnal mixing on ocean and atmospheric circulation and marine biogeochemistry, T Friedrich, A Timmermann, T Decloedt, DS Luther, A Mouchet, Ocean Modelling 39 (3), 262-274, 2011
102. Phase synchronization of the El Niño-Southern Oscillation with the annual cycle, K Stein, A Timmermann, N Schneider, Physical Review Letters 107 (12), 128501, 2011
103. Reduced interannual rainfall variability in East Africa during the last ice age, C Wolff, GH Haug, A Timmermann, JSS Damst_, A Brauer, DM Sigman, MA Cane, D, Science 333 (6043), 743-747, 2011
104. Evidence for 800years of North Atlantic multi-decadal variability from a Puerto Rican speleothem, A Winter, T Miller, Y Kushnir, A Sinha, A Timmermann, MR Jury, C Gallup, H, Earth and Planetary Science Letters 308 (1), 23-28, 2011
105. Deconstructing the Last Glacial termination: the role of millennial and orbital-scale forcings, L Menviel, A Timmermann, OE Timm, A Mouchet, Quaternary Science Reviews 30 (9), 1155-1172, 2011
106. The effect of explosive tropical volcanism on ENSO, S McGregor, A Timmermann, Journal of Climate 24 (8), 2178-2191, 2011
107. Interactions between marine biota and ENSO: a conceptual model analysis, M Heinemann, A Timmermann, U Feudel, Nonlinear Processes in Geophysics 18 (1), 29-40, 2011
108. Hypothesized link between glacial/interglacial atmospheric CO2 cycles and storage/release of CO2-rich fluids from deep-sea sediments, L Stott, A Timmermann, Geophysical Monograph Series 193, 123-138, 2011
109. Promotion of glacial ice sheet buildup 60?115 kyr BP by precessionally paced Northern Hemispheric meltwater pulses, A Timmermann, J Knies, OE Timm, A Abe-Ouchi, T Friedrich, Paleoceanography 25 (4), 2010
110. Climate and biogeochemical response to a rapid melting of the West Antarctic Ice Sheet during interglacials and implications for future climate, L Menviel, A Timmermann, OE Timm, A Mouchet, Paleoceanography 25 (4), 2010
111. Geochemical and climate modeling evidence for Holocene aridification in Hawaii: dynamic response to a weakening equatorial cold tongue, J Uchikawa, BN Popp, JE Schoonmaker, A Timmermann, SJ Lorenz, Quaternary Science Reviews 29 (23), 3057-3066, 2010
112. Seasonal Synchronization of ENSO Events in a Linear Stochastic Model, K Stein, N Schneider, A Timmermann, FF Jin, Journal of Climate 23 (21), 5629-5643, 2010
113. Warming seas in the Coral Triangle: coral reef vulnerability and management implications, E McLeod, R Moffitt, A Timmermann, R Salm, L Menviel, MJ Palmer, ER Selig, Coastal Management 38 (5), 518-539, 2010
114. The mechanism behind internally generated centennial-to-millennial scale climate variability in an earth system model of intermediate complexity, T Friedrich, A Timmermann, L Menviel, O Elison Timm, A Mouchet, DM Roche, Geoscientific Model Development 3 (2), 377-389, 2010
115. Wind effects on past and future regional Sea level trends in the Southern Indo-Pacific, A Timmermann, S McGregor, FF Jin, Journal of Climate 23 (16), 4429-4437, 2010
116. Deepwater formation in the North Pacific during the last glacial termination, Y Okazaki, A Timmermann, L Menviel, N Harada, A Abe-Ouchi, MO Chikamoto, A, Science 329 (5988), 200-204, 2010
117. Early Pliocene increase in thermohaline overturning: A precondition for the development of the modern equatorial Pacific cold tongue, S Steph, R Tiedemann, M Prange, J Groeneveld, M Schulz, A Timmermann, D, Paleoceanography 25 (2), 2010
118. The impact of global warming on the tropical Pacific Ocean and El Niño, M Collins, SI An, W Cai, A Ganachaud, E Guilyardi, FF Jin, M Jochum, M Lengaigne, S Power, A Timmermann, Nature Geoscience 3 (6), 391-397, 2010
119. Reconstructing surface temperature changes over the past 600 years using climate model simulations with data assimilation, H Goosse, E Crespin, A de Montety, ME Mann, H Renssen, A Timmermann, Journal of Geophysical Research 115 (D9), D09108, 2010
120. Mechanisms for the Onset of the African Humid Period and Sahara Greening 14.5-11 ka BP, Timm, P Koehler, A Timmermann, L Menviel, Journal of Climate 23 (10), 2612-2633, 2010
121. Impact of diurnal atmosphere-ocean coupling on tropical climate simulations using a coupled GCM, YG Ham, JS Kug, IS Kang, FF Jin, A Timmermann, Climate Dynamics 34 (6), 905-917, 2010
122. The inverse effect of annual-mean state and annual-cycle changes on ENSO, SI An, YG Ham, JS Kug, A Timmermann, J Choi, IS Kang, Journal of Climate 23 (5), 1095-1110, 2010
123. Towards a quantitative understanding of millennial-scale Antarctic warming events, A Timmermann, L Menviel, Y Okumura, A Schilla, U Merkel, O Timm, A Hu, B, Quaternary Science Reviews 29 (1), 74-85, 2010
124. A unified proxy for ENSO and PDO variability since 1650, S McGregor, A Timmermann, O Timm, Climate of the Past 6 (1), 1-17, 2010
125. Orbital modulation of millennial-scale climate variability in an earth system model of intermediate complexity, T Friedrich, A Timmermann, O Timm, A Mouchet, DM Roche, Climate of the Past Discussions 5 (4), 2019-2051, 2009
126. What Drives Climate Flip-Flops?, A Timmermann, L Menviel, Science 325 (5938), 273-274, 2009
127. Effects of biologically induced differential heating in an eddy/permitting coupled ocean-ecosystem model, U Loeptien, C Eden, A Timmermann, H Dietze, Journal of Geophysical Research: Oceans (1978-2012) 114 (C6), 2009
128. Radiocarbon age anomaly at intermediate water depth in the Pacific Ocean during the last deglaciation, L Stott, J Southon, A Timmermann, A Koutavas, Paleoceanography 24 (2), doi: 10.1029/2008PA001690, 2009
129. The Roles of CO2 and Orbital Forcing in Driving Southern Hemispheric Temperature Variations during the Last 21 000 Yr, A Timmermann, O Timm, L Stott, L Menviel, Journal of Climate 22 (7), 1626-1640, 2009
130. North Pacific climate response to freshwater forcing in the subarctic North Atlantic: Oceanic and atmospheric pathways, YM Okumura, C Deser, A Hu, A Timmermann, SP Xie, Journal of Climate 22 (6), 1424-1445, 2009
131. A mid-Holocene transition in the nitrogen dynamics of the western equatorial Pacific: Evidence of a deepening thermocline? M Kienast, MF Lehmann, A Timmermann, E Galbraith, T Bolliet, A Holbourn, C, Geophysical Research Letters 35 (23), L23610, 2008
132. Climate and marine carbon cycle response to changes in the strength of the Southern Hemispheric westerlies, L Menviel, A Timmermann, A Mouchet, O Timm, Paleoceanography 23 (4), 2008
133. Influences of Atlantic Climate Change on the Tropical Pacific via the Central American Isthmus, SP Xie, Y Okumura, T Miyama, A Timmermann, Journal of Climate 21 (15), 3914-3928, 2008
134. On the definition of seasons in paleoclimate simulations with orbital forcing, Timm, A Timmermann, A Abe-Ouchi, F Saito, T Segawa, Paleoceanography 23 (2), PA2221, 2008
135. Meridional reorganizations of marine and terrestrial productivity during Heinrich events, L Menviel, A Timmermann, A Mouchet, O Timm, Paleoceanography 23 (1), 2008
136. Effects of Salt Compensation on the Climate Model Response in Simulations of Large Changes of the Atlantic Meridional Overturning Circulation, TF Stocker, A Timmermann, M Renold, O Timm, Journal of Climate 20 (24), 5912-5928, 2007
137. Eastern tropical Pacific hydrologic changes during the past 27,000 years from D/H ratios in alkenones, K Pahnke, JP Sachs, L Keigwin, A Timmermann, SP Xie, Paleoceanography 22 (4), 2007
138. Southern hemisphere and deep-sea warming led deglacial atmospheric CO2 rise and tropical warming, L Stott, A Timmermann, R Thunell, Science 318 (5849), 435-438, 2007
139. Tropical air-sea interactions accelerate the recovery of the Atlantic meridional overturning circulation after a major shutdown, U Krebs, A Timmermann, Journal of Climate 20 (19), 4940-4956, 2007
140. The influence of a weakening of the Atlantic meridional overturning circulation on ENSO, A Timmermann, Y Okumura, SI An, A Clement, B Dong, E Guilyardi, A Hu, JH, Journal of Climate 20 (19), 4899-4919, 2007
141. Simulation of the Last 21 000 Years Using Accelerated Transient Boundary Conditions, Timm, A Timmermann, Journal of Climate 20 (17), 4377-4401, 2007
142. The effect of orbital forcing on the mean climate and variability of the tropical Pacific, A Timmermann, SJ Lorenz, SI An, A Clement, SP Xie, Journal of Climate 20 (16), 4147-4159, 2007
143. Modulation of the bipolar seesaw in the Southeast Pacific during Termination 1, F Lamy, J Kaiser, HW Arz, D Hebbeln, U Ninnemann, O Timm, A Timmermann, JR, Earth and Planetary Science Letters 259 (3), 400-413, 2007
144. Fast advective recovery of the Atlantic meridional overturning circulation after a Heinrich event, U Krebs, A Timmermann, Paleoceanography 22 (1), doi: 10.1029/2005PA001259, 2007
145. The Influence of ENSO on the Generation of Decadal Variability in the North Pacific, SI An, JS Kug, A Timmermann, IS Kang, O Timm, Journal of Climate 20 (4), 667-680, 2007
146. Ensemble-mean dynamics of the ENSO recharge oscillator under state-dependent stochastic forcing, FF Jin, L Lin, A Timmermann, J Zhao, Geophysical Research Letters 34 (3), 2007
147. Using paleoclimate proxy-data to select optimal realisations in an ensemble of simulations of the climate of the past millennium, H Goosse, H Renssen, A Timmermann, RS Bradley, ME Mann, Climate Dynamics 27 (2-3), 165-184, 2006
148. Sub-Milankovitch cycles in periplatform carbonates from the early Pliocene Great Bahama Bank, L Reuning, JJG Reijmer, C Betzler, A Timmermann, S Steph, Paleoceanography 21 (1), 2006
149. Predictability of coupled processes, A Timmermann, FF Jin, Predictability of Weather and Climate, 251-274, 2006
150. An initial intercomparison of atmospheric and oceanic climatology for the ICE-5G and ICE-4G models of LGM paleotopography, F Justino, A Timmermann, U Merkel, WR Peltier, Journal of Climate 19 (1), 3-14, 2006
151. The origin of the" European Medieval Warm Period", H Goosse, O Arzel, J Luterbacher, ME Mann, H Renssen, N Riedwyl, A Timmermann, E Xoplaki, H Wanner, Climate of the Past 2, 99-113, 2006
152. Mechanisms for millennial-scale global synchronization during the last glacial period, A Timmermann, U Krebs, F Justino, H Goosse, T Ivanochko, Paleoceanography 20 (4), doi: 10.1029/2004PA0010902005, 2005
153. Synoptic Reorganization of Atmospheric Flow during the Last Glacial Maximum, F Justino, A Timmermann, U Merkel, EP Souza, Journal of climate 18 (15), 2826-2846, 2005
154. ENSO Suppression due to Weakening of the North Atlantic Thermohaline Circulation, A Timmermann, SI An, U Krebs, H Goosse, Journal of Climate 18 (16), 3122-3139, 2005
155. Internal and forced climate variability during the last millennium: a model-data comparison using ensemble simulations, H Goosse, H Renssen, A Timmermann, RS Bradley, Quaternary Science Reviews 24 (12), 1345-1360, 2005
156. Biophysical feedbacks in the tropical Pacific, B Marzeion, A Timmermann, R Murtugudde, FF Jin, Journal of Climate 18 (1), 58-70, 2005
157. An organizing center for thermohaline excitability, J Abshagen, A Timmermann, Journal of Physical Oceanography 34 (12), 2756-2760, 2004
158. Modeling evidence for enhanced El Niño-Southern Oscillation amplitude during the Last Glacial Maximum, SI An, A Timmermann, L Bejarano, FF Jin, F Justino, Z Liu, AW Tudhope, Paleoceanography 19 (4), 2004
159. Glacial-interglacial contrast in climate variability at centennial-to-millennial timescales: observations and conceptual model, M Schulz, A Paul, A Timmermann, Quaternary Science Reviews 23 (20), 2219-2230, 2004
160. Nonlinear dimensionality reduction in climate data, AJ Gamez, CS Zhou, A Timmermann, J Kurths, Nonlinear Processes in Geophysics 11 (3), 393-398, 2004
161. Surface temperature control in the North and tropical Pacific during the last glacial maximum, A Timmermann, F Justino, FF Jin, U Krebs, H Goosse, Climate dynamics 23 (3-4), 353-370, 2004
162. Strong hemispheric coupling of glacial climate through freshwater discharge and ocean circulation, R Knutti, J Flueckiger, TF Stocker, A Timmermann, Nature 430 (7002), 851-856, 2004
163. The influence of the Galapagos Islands on tropical temperatures, currents and the generation of tropical instability waves, C Eden, A Timmermann, Geophysical Research Letters 31 (15), 2004
164. Intensification of the annual cycle in the tropical Pacific due to greenhouse warming, A Timmermann, FF Jin, M Collins, Geophysical Research Letters 31 (12), 2004
165. Is the wind stress forcing essential for the meridional overturning circulation?, A Timmermann, H Goosse, Geophysical Research Letters 31 (4), 2004
166. Coherent resonant millennial-scale climate oscillations triggered by massive meltwater pulses, A Timmermann, H Gildor, M Schulz, E Tziperman, Journal of Climate 16 (15), 2569-2585, 2003
167. Decadal ENSO amplitude modulations: A nonlinear paradigm, A Timmermann, Global and Planetary Change 37 (1), 135-156, 2003
168. Potential feedbacks between Pacific Ocean ecosystems and interdecadal climate variations, AJ Miller, MA Alexander, GJ Boer, F Chai, K Denman, DJ Erickson III, R Frouin, A. Gabruc, EA Laws, MR Lewis, Z Liu, R Murtugudde, S Nakamoto, DJ Neilson, JR Norris, JC Ohlmann, RI Perry, N Schneider, KM Shell, A Timmermann, Bulletin of the American Meteorological Society 84 (5), 617-633, 2003
169. Strong El Niño events and nonlinear dynamical heating, FF Jin, SI An, A Timmermann, J Zhao, Geophysical research letters 30 (3), 20-1-20-1, 2003
170. Cyclic Markov Chains with an Application to ENSO Predictability, R Pasmanter, A Timmermann, Nonlinear Processes Geophysics, 201-214, 2003
171. A nonlinear theory for El Niño bursting, A Timmermann, FF Jin, J Abshagen, Journal of the Atmospheric Sciences 60 (1), 152-165, 2003
172. Relaxation oscillators in concert: A framework for climate change at millennial timescales during the late Pleistocene, M Schulz, A Paul, A Timmermann, Geophysical Research Letters 29 (24), 2193, 2002
173. Phytoplankton influences on tropical climate, A Timmermann, FF Jin, Geophysical Research Letters 29 (23), 2104, 2002
174. Comments on "Noise-induced transitions in a simplified model of the thermohaline circulation" AH Monahan, A Timmermann, G Lohmann, Journal of Physical Oceanography 32 (3), 1112-1116, 2002
175. A nonlinear mechanism for decadal El Niño amplitude changes, A Timmermann, FF Jin, Geophysical Research Letters 29 (1), 1003, 2002
176. Empirical dynamical system modeling of ENSO using nonlinear inverse techniques, A Timmermann, HU Voss, R Pasmanter, Journal of Physical Oceanography 31 (6), 1579-1598, 2001
177. Changes of ENSO stability due to greenhouse warming, A Timmermann, Geophysical Research Letters 28 (10), 2061-2064, 2001
178. . Noise-induced transitions in a simplified model of the thermohaline circulation, A Timmermann, G Lohmann, Journal of Physical Oceanography 30 (8), 1891-1900, 2000
179. Modes of climate variability as simulated by a coupled general circulation model. Part I: ENSO-like climate variability and its low-frequency modulation, A Timmermann, M Latif, A Groetzner, R Voss, Climate Dynamics 15 (8), 605-618, 1999
180. Interannual to decadal predictability in a coupled ocean-atmosphere general circulation model, A Groetzner, M Latif, A Timmermann, R Voss, Journal of Climate 12 (8), 2607-2624, 1999
181. Detecting the nonstationary response of ENSO to greenhouse warming, A Timmermann, Journal of the Atmospheric Sciences 56 (14), 2313-2325, 1999
182. Increased El Niño frequency in a climate model forced by future greenhouse warming, A Timmermann, J Oberhuber, A Bacher, M Esch, M Latif, E Roeckner, Nature 398 (6729), 694-697, 1999
183. Northern hemispheric interdecadal variability: a coupled air-sea mode, A Timmermann, M Latif, R Voss, A Groetzner, Journal of Climate 11 (8), 1906-1931, 1998
184. Thermal photon production in heavy-ion collisions, N Arbex, U Ornik, M Pluemer, A Timmermann, RM Weiner, Physics Letters B 345 (3), 307-312, 1995
185. Photon interferometry of quark-gluon dynamics reexamined, A Timmermann, M Pluemer, L Razumov, RM Weiner, Physical Review C 5
