= Honorary Busan citizenship =

Honorary citizens of Busan City in South Korea

Awarded by (South Korea) Busan
- Type: Honorary citizenship
- Country: South Korea

Statistics
- First induction: 1966
- Total inductees: 282

Logo of Busan (2023–)

Honorary Busan citizenship has been granted to a mixture of South Koreans and foreign nationals since 1966. As of July 2025, 282 individuals have received the honor. To qualify, a nominee must have raised the status of Busan, contributed to resident's lives or cultural development, or contributed to science and technology or city administration, and either be a citizen of South Korea not residing in the city or a foreign national legally residing in the city. Individuals may be nominated by certain government officials or 30 or more residents of the city.

== Honorary citizens of Busan ==
Year	Name	Country
1966	Jin Gyecheon	Taiwan
1966	Charles P. Venable	United States
1967	Bu Junhu	Taiwan
1967	Mabel Culter	United States
1968	Margareta Lindblom	Sweden
1968	Ju Wijeong	Taiwan
1968	Ralph Lewis	United States
1968	Paul Jhalin	United States
1968	S. R. Dawson	United Kingdom
1969	Jang Jucheon	Taiwan
1969	Frank C. Wiatter	United States
1970	Gerhard Franzmann	Germany
1970	Yi Seo	Taiwan
1970	Igawa Katsuri	Japan
1970	Thomas Donahue	United States
1970	Sam Yorty	United States
1971	-	-
1972	Utsumi Toichi	Japan
1973	-	-
1974	Namik Kemal Santiirk	Turkey
1975	Wang Okwoon	Taiwan
1976	Bruce F. Hunt	United States
1977	Nobert Jasper	Germany
1978	Paul Koppelberg	Germany
1978	Lamar Stephenson	United States
1978	Manual Valentin Gamazo	Spain
1979	Wilbur Nelson	United States
1979	Thomas Bradley	United States
1979	Charles Wiggs	United States
1979	Yves Le Corre	France
1979	Kurt Schmidtke	Germany
1980	Izumida Yoshisugu	Japan
1980	Robert Lees	United States
1980	William Chandler	United States
1981	Kozaburo Fukuda	Japan
1981	Jang Saseung	Taiwan
1982	Aloysius Schwartz	United States
1982	Iren Theimar Branun	United States
1982	Richard Cloy	United States
1983	Heo Sudeok	Taiwan
1983	Hamanaka Shukatsu	Japan
1983	Finis B. Jeffery	United States
1983	Shirley Jeffery	United States
1984	Ruby Wheat	United States
1984	Sanae Hosoda	Japan
1984	Pasqual Maragall	Spain
1985	Raumord J.Morin	United States
1986	Jang Sogun	Taiwan
1987	Lester Walkley	United States
1987	Takeo Kimi	Japan
1987	Wakasugi Genki	Japan
1988	Yeo Youngmi	Taiwan
1989	William Chastain	United States
1990	Will Frazier	United States
1991	Yildirim Akbulut	Turkey
1991	Shigeru Uchio	Japan
1991	Rebekah Lambert	United States
1992	Kim Insu	South Korea
1992	Kim Doeon	South Korea
1992	Jang Sangjae	South Korea
1992	Seo Jeongjae	South Korea
1992	Hong Youngpyo	South Korea
1992	Kim Dongseop	South Korea
1993	Barbara H.Martin	Australia
1994	Sunarto Sumoprawiro	Indonesia
1994	Benjamin Hilly	Indonesia
1994	Harjoso Supeno	Indonesia
1994	Setyo Hartono	Indonesia
1995	-	-
1996	-	-
1997	Charles Townes	United States
1997	Kang Dongseok	South Korea
1997	Ancha Flubacher Rhim	Switzerland
1997	Lim Hyeonok	United States
1997	Tony Rayns	United Kingdom
1997	Wong Ain Ling	Taiwan
1997	Paul Yi	United States
1997	Akira Nishio	Japan
1998	Kiyoshi Ejima	Japan
1998	Jiang Zeng Chai	China
1999	Antoni Negre Villavecchia	Spain
2000	Yun Kang-ro	South Korea
2000	Shin Kyukho	South Korea
2001	-	-
2002	-	-
2003	Chung Mongjoon	South Korea
2003	Guus Hiddink	Netherlands
2004	Lee Yoongoo	South Korea
2004	Do Youngsim	South Korea
2004	Kim Dong-ho	South Korea
2005	Yoo Jae-geon	South Korea
2005	Yoon Jonghoon	South Korea
2005	Shin Hyunwook	South Korea
2005	Ahn Daehee	South Korea
2005	Kim Young-ki	South Korea
2005	Kim Kiseong	South Korea
2005	Liu Jinfeng	China
2005	Cho Yong-pil	South Korea
2005	Lee Honggoo	South Korea
2005	Park Inyong	South Korea
2005	Na Kyungryeol	South Korea
2005	Seol Seongdu	South Korea
2005	Jo Sumi	South Korea
2005	Park Jongcheol	South Korea
2005	Vladimir zrano vich Kurilov	Russia
2005	Valery Petrovich Dikarev	Russia
2005	Vladmir Vasilyevich Verkholyak	Russia
2005	Moon Sungjae	South Korea
2005	Ole von Beust	Germany
2005	Lee Heungbok	South Korea
2005	Lê Thanh Hải	Vietnam
2005	Helmut Korte	Germany
2005	Petra Helmut Korte	Germany
2005	Lee Hong-hee	South Korea
2005	Lim Seungkwan	South Korea
2005	Moon Hyegang	South Korea
2005	Lee Mongryong	South Korea
2005	Hwang Jinseop	South Korea
2005	Cha Taegyun	South Korea
2006	Moon Young-ho	South Korea
2006	Abe Takaya	Japan
2006	Eo Cheongsu	South Korea
2006	Viacheslav P. Tsupikov	Russia
2006	Jérôme Stoll	France
2006	Seol Jeongseon	South Korea
2006	Choe Jongmu	South Korea
2006	Kim Dowon	South Korea
2006	Seo Jinhyeon	South Korea
2006	Kim Houp	South Korea
2006	Heinz Wagner	Germany
2006	Lee Jongbaek	South Korea
2006	Jeon Bugwan	South Korea
2006	Ryu Usik	South Korea
2006	Park Jeonghwa	South Korea
2006	Kang Heerak	South Korea
2006	Song Jinho	South Korea
2006	Jeong Sanggon	South Korea
2007	Chu Junseok	South Korea
2007	Lee Insoo	South Korea
2007	Yang Wonmo	South Korea
2007	Yoon Myunggi	South Korea
2007	Son Moohyun	South Korea
2007	Jang Sugil	South Korea
2007	Ahn Eonsuk	South Korea
2007	Park Joohan	South Korea
2007	Park Sunggyu	South Korea
2007	Ahn Youngwook	South Korea
2007	Toby S. C. Dawson	United States
2007	Lee Deokhyung	South Korea
2007	Kim Wonsoo	South Korea
2007	Hirotaro Yamasaki	Japan
2007	Lee Sooja	South Korea
2007	Lee Seungheon	South Korea
2007	Won Taeho	South Korea
2007	Yang Seungtaek	South Korea
2008	Kwon Namhyuk	South Korea
2008	Lee Myunggyu	South Korea
2008	Park Sanggil	South Korea
2008	Kim Taehyun	South Korea
2008	Daisaku Ikeda	Japan
2008	Lee Youngtak	South Korea
2008	Ahn Kiseok	South Korea
2008	Choi Yong-rim	South Korea
2008	Jeron Kennis Royster	United States
2008	Choi Gongrim	South Korea
2008	Yoon Youngsik	South Korea
2008	Heo Byeongik	South Korea
2009	Kim Jungyu	South Korea
2009	Kim Soomin	South Korea
2009	Ha Jung Woong	South Korea
2009	Hiroyuki Inoue	Japan
2009	Tien Baojian	China
2009	Moon Hyonam	South Korea
2009	Kim Changhwan	South Korea
2009	Park Yongseok	South Korea
2009	Lee Dongsik	South Korea
2009	Kwon Hyukno	South Korea
2009	Park Jangkyung	South Korea
2009	Kim Jongho	South Korea
2010	Kim JungHwak	South Korea
2010	Baek Seongtae	South Korea
2010	Abdullah Gül	Turkey
2010	Heo Jang-wook	South Korea
2010	Kim Hoik	South Korea
2010	Kim Kyungsoo	South Korea
2010	Lee Kangdeok	South Korea
2010	Kang Guyoung	South Korea
2011	Cho Geun-ho	South Korea
2011	Jo Byeonghyeon	South Korea
2011	Walleri Yermolov	Russia
2011	Tamitsuji Shuitsu	Japan
2011	Trauner Anton Joseph	Germany
2011	Song Kwangjo	South Korea
2011	Hwang Kyoahn	South Korea
2011	Kwak Sangwook	South Korea
2011	Wolf Dieter Prix	Austria
2011	Ahn Changkyung	South Korea
2011	Hwang Gicheol	South Korea
2012	Yang Kyungjong	South Korea
2012	Seo Cheonho	South Korea
2012	Lee Jaesoo	South Korea
2012	Lee Wanggeun	South Korea
2012	Lee Jeonhwan	South Korea
2012	Seok Dong-hyun	South Korea
2012	Gu Okhoe	South Korea
2013	Tom Cruise	United States
2013	Rosamund Pike	United Kingdom
2013	Christopher McQuarrie	United States
2013	Yukio Yoden	Japan
2013	Lee Seonghan	South Korea
2013	Kim Hongil	South Korea
2013	Lee Deokhong	South Korea
2013	Kim Eunho	South Korea
2013	Kang Kiok	South Korea
2013	Lee Jaeseon	South Korea
2013	Hidetaka Omichi	Japan
2013	Miyazaki Satsuki	Japan
2013	Hamadoon Touré	Mali
2013	Son Jeongsu	South Korea
2013	Shin Yongsun	South Korea
2013	Kim Hyunwoong	South Korea
2013	Kim Heekwan	South Korea
2013	Lee Seungho	South Korea
2013	Park Hanki	South Korea
2013	Lee Ilhwan	South Korea
2013	Kim Yeongeun	South Korea
2013	Jeong Hoseop	South Korea
2014	Zhao Houlin	China
2014	Hwang Myeongsu	South Korea
2014	Lee Geumhyung	South Korea
2014	Venu Srinivasan	India
2015	Kim Kyungsoo	South Korea
2015	Baek Jongsu	South Korea
2015	Nam Sanggyu	South Korea
2015	Juan Orlando Hernández	Honduras
2015	Yoon Hyungbin	South Korea
2015	Park Seokjin	South Korea
2015	Eom Hyunseong	South Korea
2015	Go Deokgeun	South Korea
2015	Kim Jaebeom	South Korea
2016	Kwon Kiseon	South Korea
2016	Won Jeonghee	South Korea
2016	François Provo	France
2016	Lee Sangsik	South Korea
2016	Tomoaki Nakao	Japan
2016	Lee Jonghae	South Korea
2017	Choi Hyunmin	South Korea
2017	Kang Mingoo	South Korea
2017	Seo Jin Wook	South Korea
2017	Heo Youngbeom	South Korea
2017	Hwang Cheol-gyu	South Korea
2017	Jeong Jin-seop	South Korea
2017	Brad Cooper	United States
2017	Leo Gabriel Demay	Canada
2018	-	-
2019	Kon Masayuki	Japan
2019	Hiroshi Okamoto (岡本寛司)	Japan
2019	Carlos Carlanco	United States
2019	Mark Geoffrey Yeandle	United Kingdom
2019	Tri Rismaharini	Indonesia
2019	Danielle Kang	United States
2019	Lee Jae-yong	South Korea
2019	Vincent Courtenay	Canada
2019	Sébastien Guillaume	France
2019	Yeo Woon-tae	South Korea
2020	Darcy Paquet	United States
2020	Song Young-gil	South Korea
2021	Kang Shin-cheol	South Korea
2021	Woo Kyung Ha	South Korea
2021	Jo Han-kyung	South Korea
2021	Lee Young-seon	South Korea
2021	Ryu Kyung-hwa	South Korea
2021	Ban Min-gyu	South Korea
2021	Dawood Abdul Rahman Al-Hajri	United Arab Emirates
2021	Byeon Sunam	South Korea
2021	Wang Yilu	China
2022	James Raymond Grundy	United Kingdom
2022	Witold Bańka	Poland
2022	Yang Yang	China
2022	Olivier Niggli	Swiss
2022	René Bouchard	Canada
2022	Rafal Piechota	Poland
2022	Yu Daejong	South Korea
2022	Yu Wonha	South Korea
2023	Katuwana Vijithawansha Thero	Sri Lanka
2023	Yang Seongpil	South Korea
2024	-	-
2025	Neil. A. Koprowski	United States
2025	Axel Timmermann	Germany

== See also ==
- Honorary Citizen of South Korea
- List of honorary citizens of Seoul
