= Climate Dynamics =

- Discipline: Climatology
- Language: English
- Edited by: Jean-Claude Duplessy, Susanna Corti, Jian Lu, Jianping Li, Zhaohua Wu, V. Krishnamurthy, Kyung-Ja Ha

Publication details
- History: 1986-present
- Publisher: Springer Science+Business Media
- Frequency: Monthly
- Impact factor: 4.901 (2021)

Standard abbreviations
- ISO 4: Clim. Dyn.

Indexing
- CODEN: CLDYEM
- ISSN: 0930-7575 (print); 1432-0894 (web)
- LCCN: 89642379
- OCLC no.: 609893843

Links
- Journal homepage

Climate Dynamics is a peer-reviewed scientific journal published by Springer Science+Business Media. It covers all aspects of the dynamics of global climate systems, including analytical and numerical modeling research on the structure and behavior of the atmosphere, oceans, cryosphere, biomass, and land surface as interacting components of the dynamics of global climate. The journal also publishes reviews and papers emphasizing an integrated view of the physical and biogeochemical processes governing climate and climate change.

== Impact ==
According to the Journal Citation Reports, the journal has a 2020 impact factor of 4.375.

== Editors ==
The editors-in-chief are:

- J-C Duplessy (CNRS, Gif sur Yvette)
- E. K. Schneider (George Mason University)
- Ben Kirtman (University of Miami)
- Susanna Corti (Consiglio Nazionale delle Ricerche, Bologna)
- David G. DeWitt (International Research Institute for Climate and Society, Palisades, NY)
