= Lê Thanh Hải =

Vietnamese politician

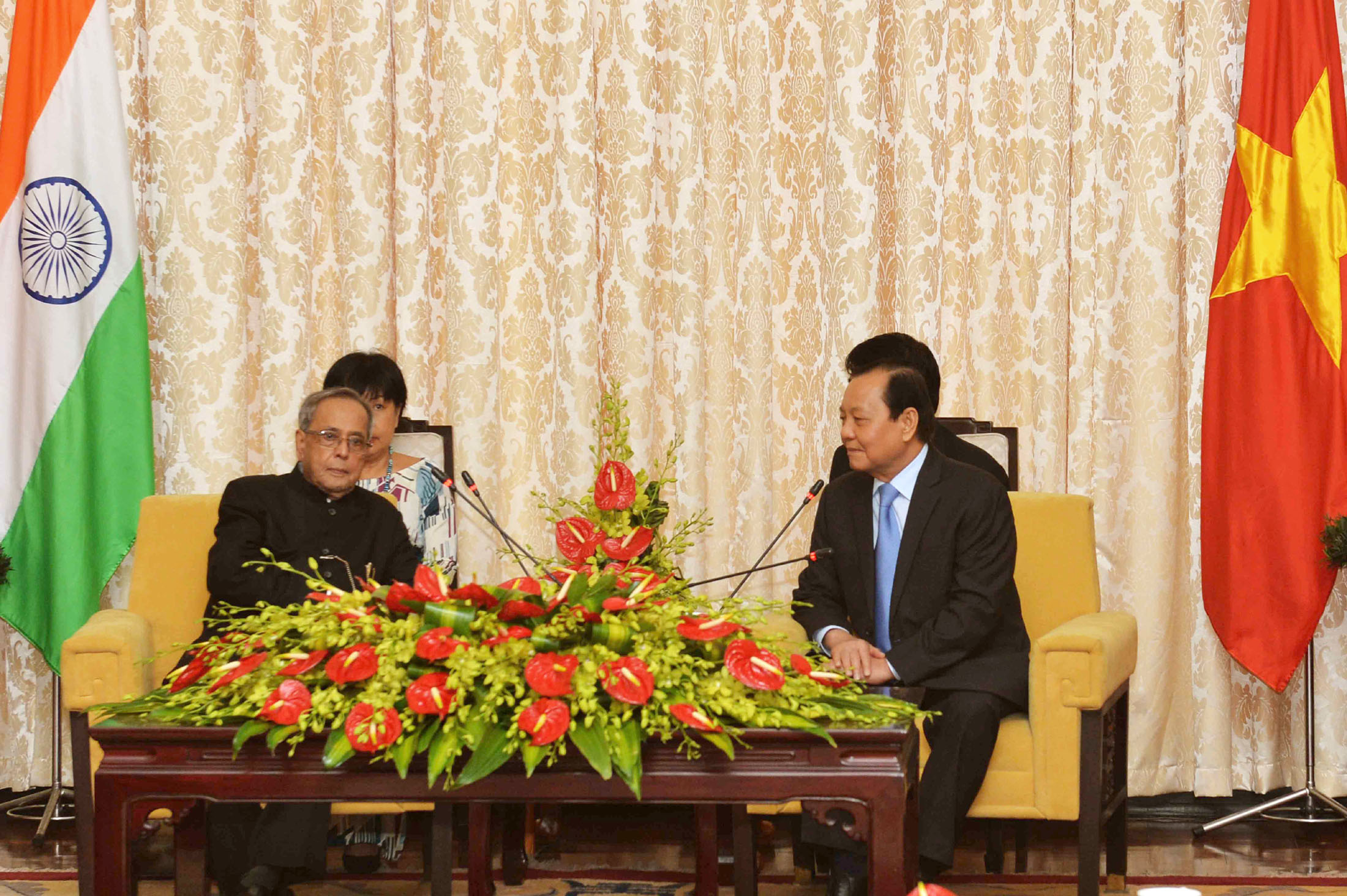
- Hải (right) with Pranab Mukherjee in 2014

Secretary of the Ho Chi Minh City Party Committee
- In office 28 June 2006 – 5 February 2016
- Preceded by: Nguyễn Minh Triết
- Succeeded by: Đinh La Thăng

Member of the Politburo
- In office 25 April 2006 – 27 January 2016

Personal details
- Born: 20 February 1950 (age 76) Tiền Giang province
- Party: Communist Party

Lê Thanh Hải (Vietnamese pronunciation: [le˧˧ tʰajŋ̟˧˧ haːj˧˩]; born 20 February 1950 in Tiền Giang province) served as Secretary of the Ho Chi Minh City Party Committee from 2005 to 2015. Lê Thanh Hải was a member of the 11th Politburo, in which he is ranked 6th.

== Early life ==
Lê Thanh Hải was born on 20 February 1950 in Tiền Giang province. In 1966, he went to Saigon as a welder and joined the propaganda team of the Sài Gòn – Gia Định Youth Union with the alias Hai Nhựt.

== Career ==
Lê Thanh Hải became member of the Communist Party of Vietnam in 1968. From 1968 to April 1975, he was deputy secretary of the communist party committee, member of the executive committee of the Sài Gòn – Gia Định Union, Member of the Standing Committee of the Party Committee, deputy head of the Youth Union Permanent member of Thanh Tan Youth Workers' Committee, Member of Phú Tân Sơn District People's Committee

== Honors ==
In 2005, Lê Thanh Hải received honorary Busan citizenship.
