= Bruce F. Hunt =

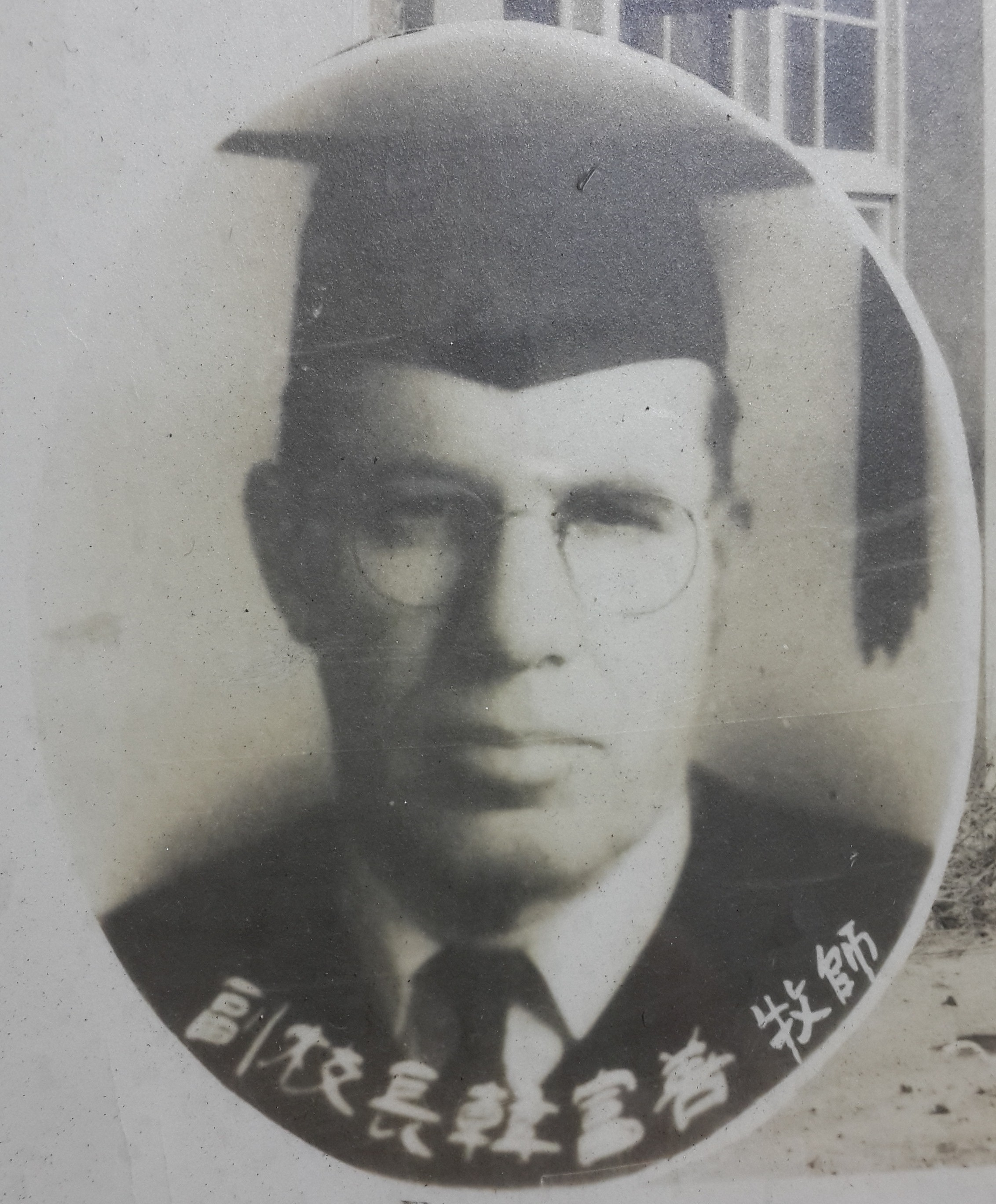
Bruce F. Hunt in Korea Seminary in Busan, S. Korea

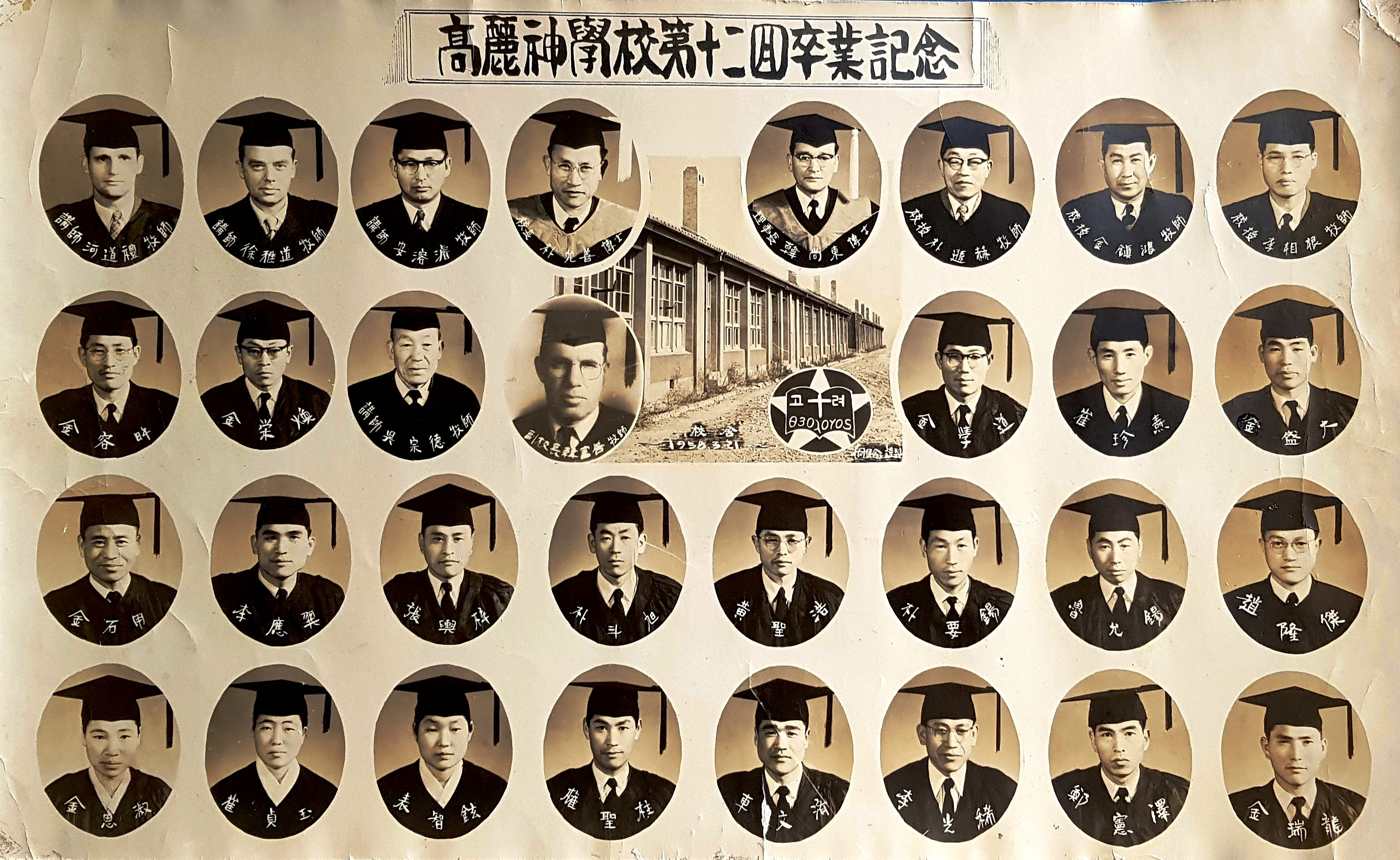
Students of Korea Seminary in Busan, S. Korea, 1958

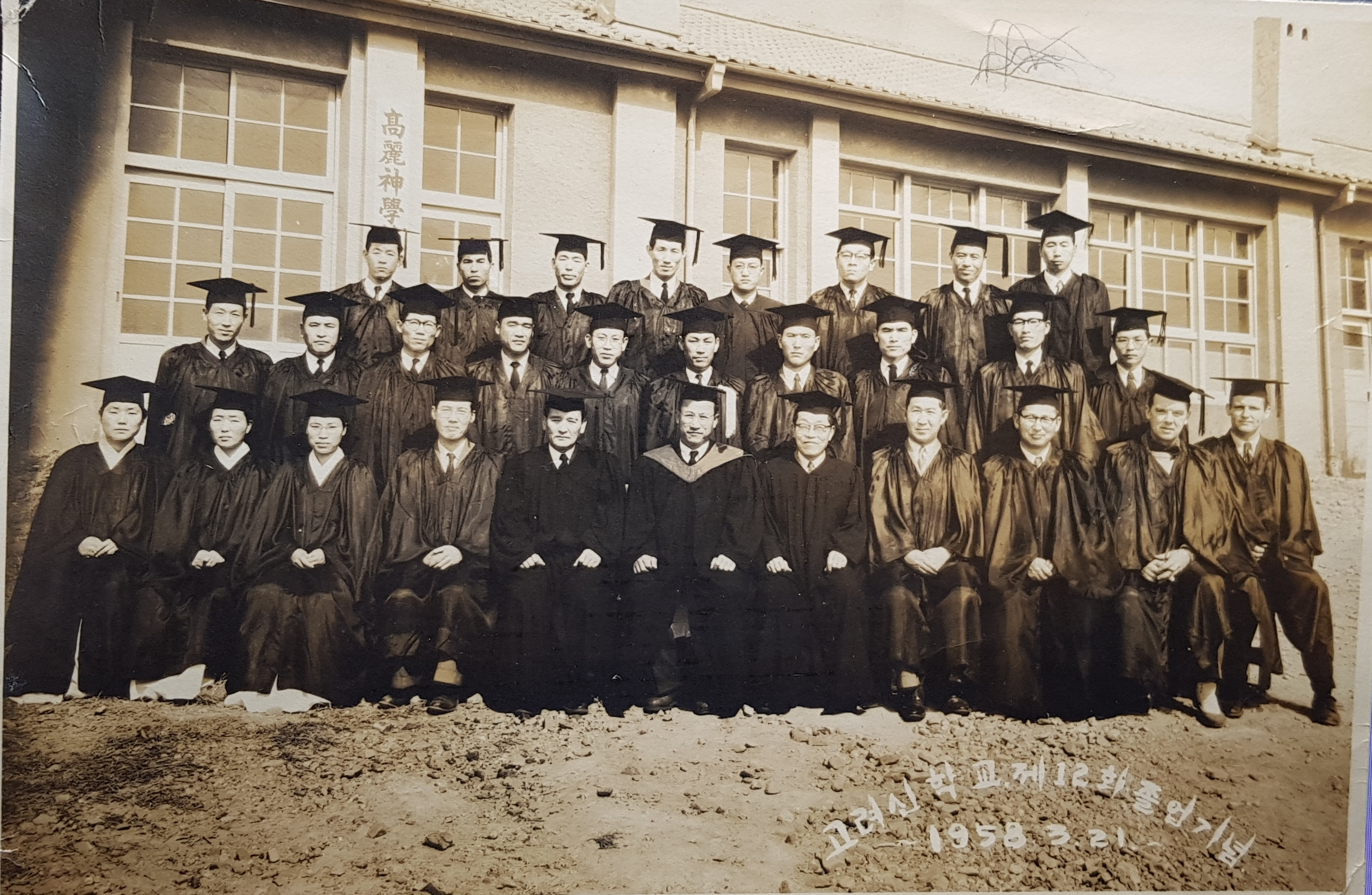
Graduation of Korea Seminary,1958

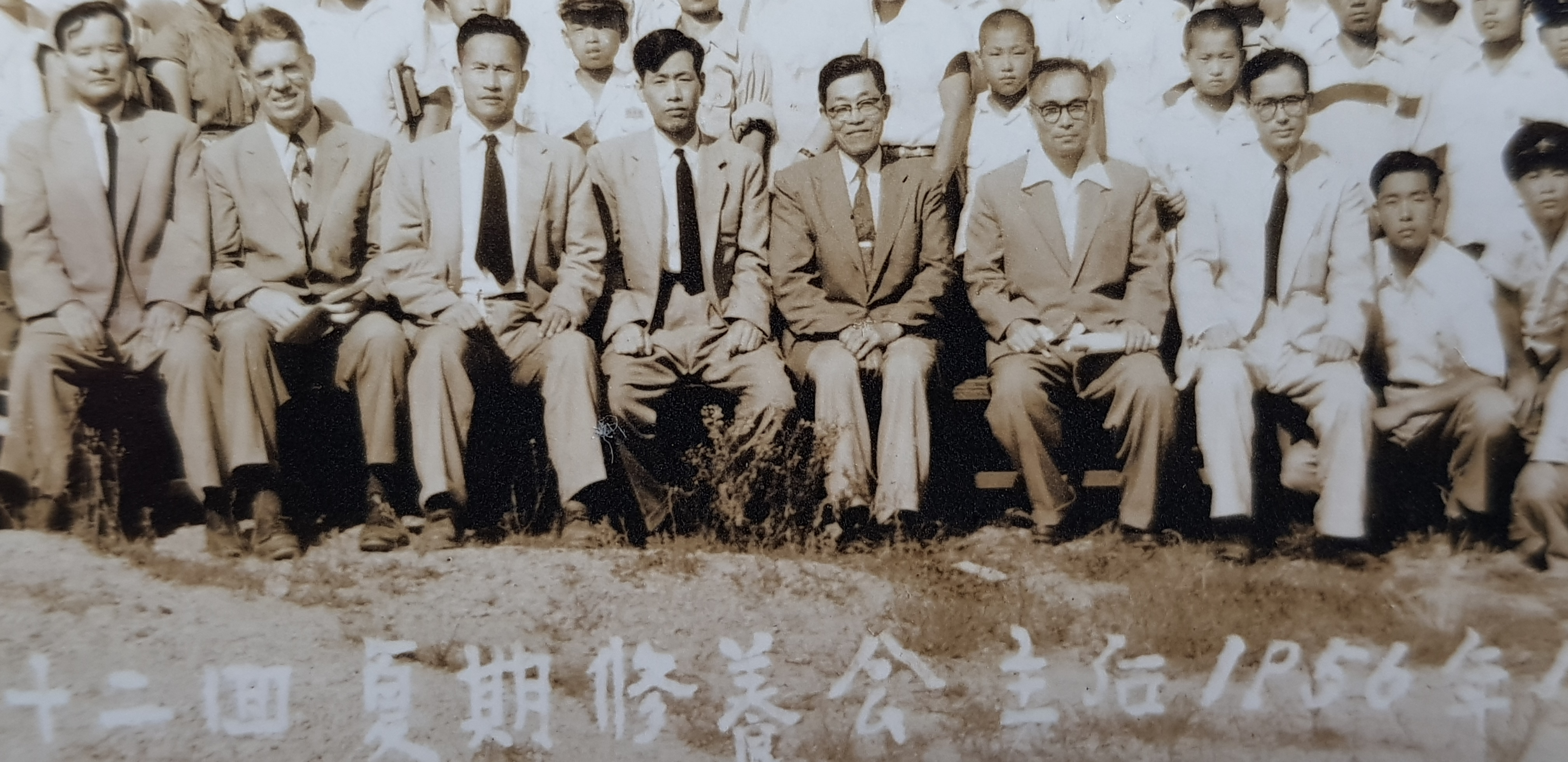
Professors of Korea Seminary with Bruce F. Hunt (second from left) 1956

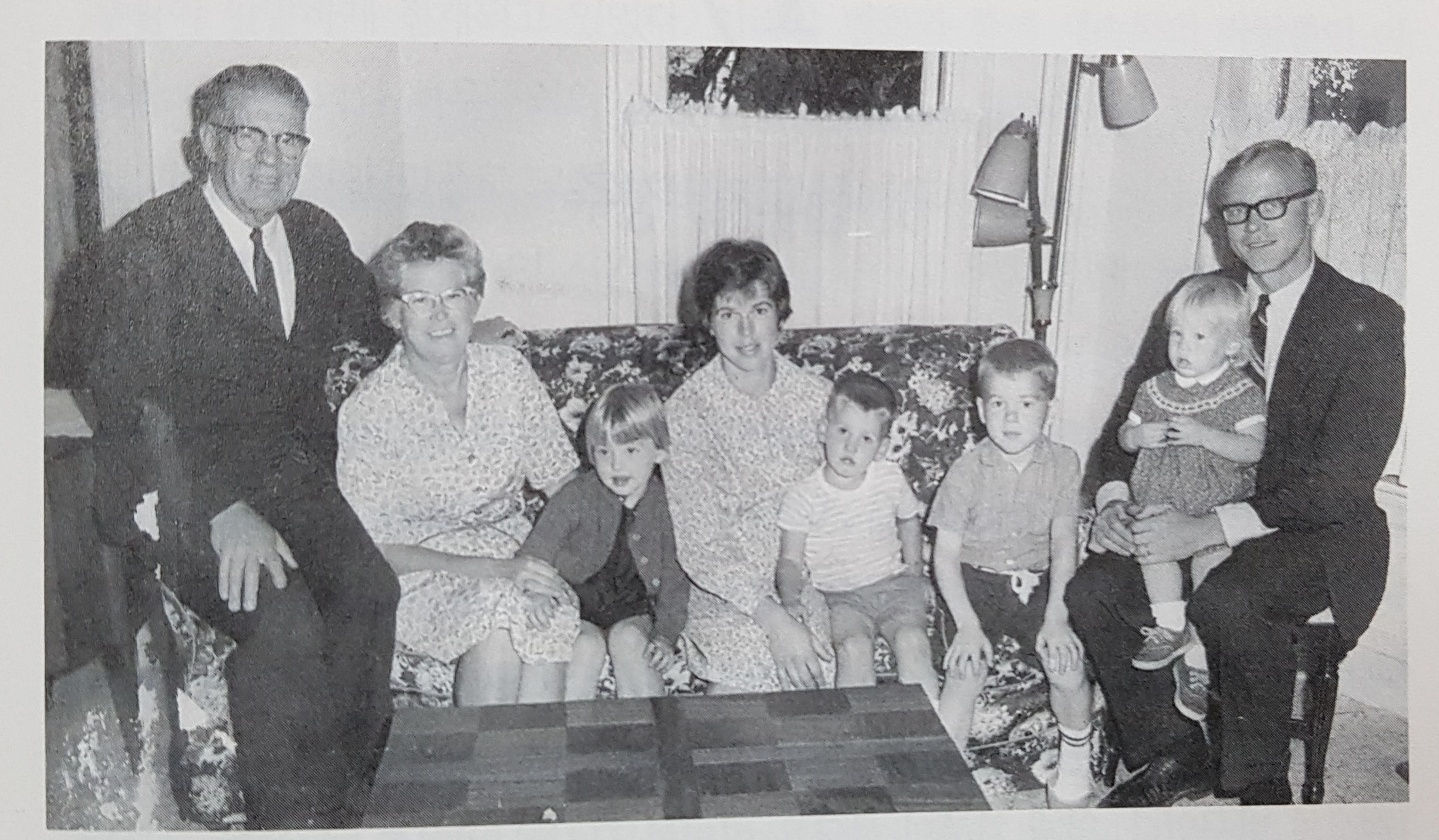
Bruce F. Hunt and his law in son Chip Stonehouse

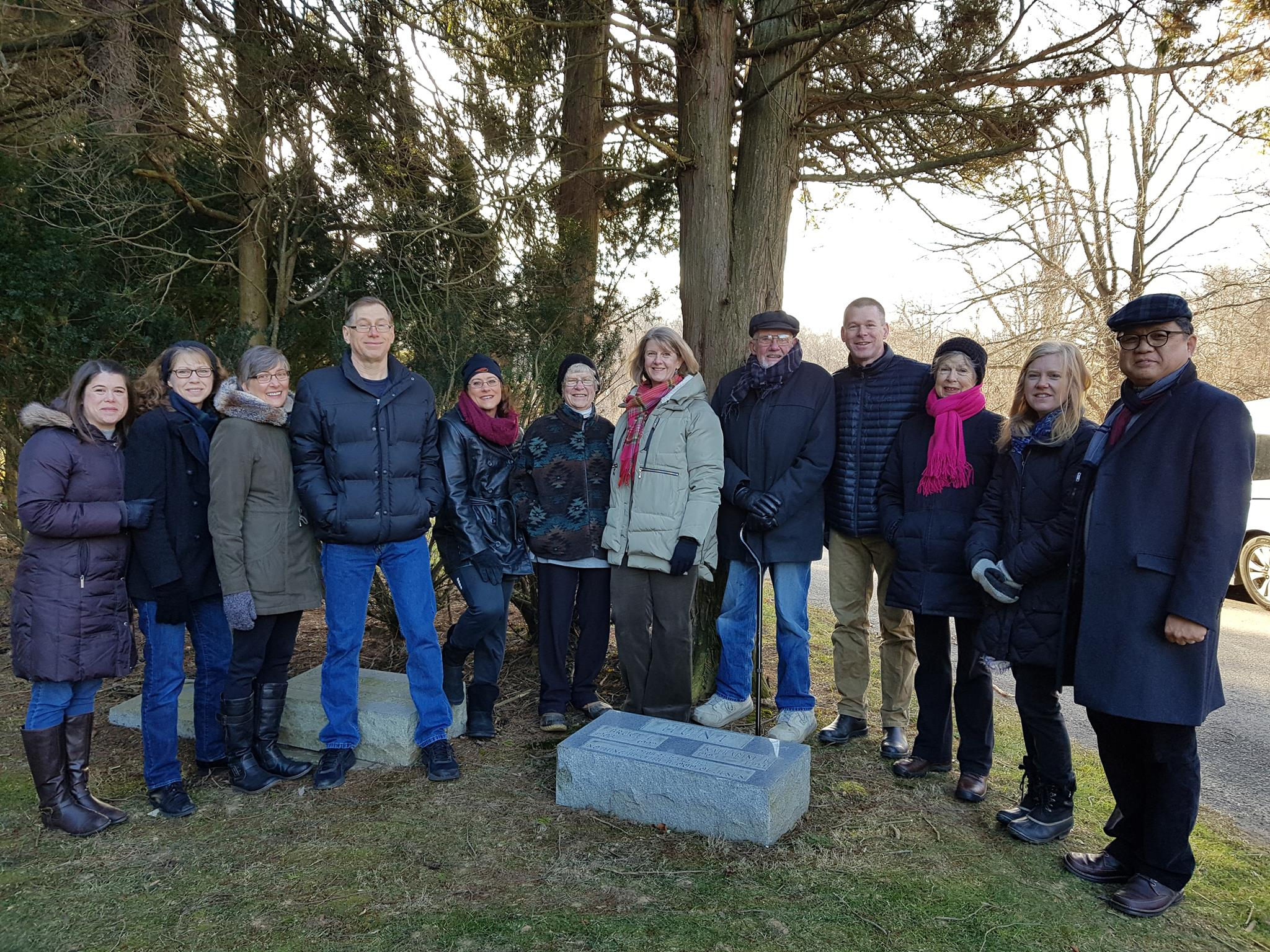
the descendant of Bruce F. Hunt(한부선)

Bruce F. Hunt (June 4, 1903 - July 26, 1992) was a missionary born in Korea, serving the Orthodox Presbyterian Church for 48 years, until 1976. He was a second generation missionary to Korea, following his father William B. Hunt. Bruce Hunt was a professor at Korea Seminary in Busan South Korea. He was detained for helping Korean Christians during the Japanese occupation without yielding to torture or intimidation.

== Education ==
Hunt was born in Pyongyang on June 4, 1903, to William Brewster Hunt (1869-1953) and Bertha Violet Finley Hunt. Due to the missionary work of his father, he participated in evangelism gatherings and Bible schools since childhood. After studying at Pyongyang Foreign School, he left to study in the US in June 1919, attending Soldan High School in St. Louis, Missouri. He was admitted to Wheaton College in Illinois in 1920, but during his college years, he went through a period of spiritual distress and eventually came to a turning point in his life by experiencing rebirth and devoting himself to the missions. He then transferred to Rutgers University, graduated, and matriculated at Princeton Theological Seminary. Hunt went to Korea as a missionary in the fall in 1928.

== Career ==
His first sabbatical was spent at Westminster Theological Seminary during 1935-36. In 1936, he left the PCUSA and became a founding member of the PCA (later OPC). As a member of the Presbyterian Independent Mission Board, under the leadership of J. Gresham Machen, Hunt served in Manchuria from 1936 to 1942. During that time, he became a missionary under the OPC Foreign Mission Board. Hunt returned to Korea in 1946. The Korean War again interrupted his work in 1950, but he was able to return once more in 1952. Hunt was the person who conducted the Nevius mission method and emphasized the characteristic of the Bible's centrality. Hunt had a great interest in Bible-centered evangelism and his theological tendency was strongly oriented toward Calvinism. He thoroughly believed that preserving the historical faith of the Korean Presbyterian Church against the challenge of liberal theology was the way to preserve the church. Late in life he moved to the Quarryville Nursing Home, near Philadelphia, Pennsylvania and died on July 26, 1992.
