= June-Yi Lee =

South Korean climatologist

June-Yi Lee is an atmospheric scientist at Pusan National University known for her use of models to investigate the atmosphere and the ocean under future climate scenarios.

== Education and career ==
Lee received a B.S. from Ewha Womans University in 1997. She earned an M.S. (1999) and a Ph.D. (2003) from Seoul National University. She then did postdoctoral work at NASA and the University of Hawaiʻi. As of 2022 she is an associate professor at Pusan National University, and an associate researcher at the University of Hawaii.

== Research ==
Lee's early work examined rainfall patterns and modeling of the Asian-Australian monsoon. She subsequently examined seasonal predictions within coupled ocean-atmosphere models, with a particular focus on seasonal oscillations and the impact on the Asian summer monsoon. More recently she examines how the monsoon is parameterized within the CMIP5 model. In 2021, she was the coordinating lead author for Working Group I, chapter 4 of the Intergovernmental Panel on Climate Change.

== Selected publications ==
- Timmermann, Axel; An, Soon-Il; Kug, Jong-Seong; Jin, Fei-Fei; Cai, Wenju; Capotondi, Antonietta; Cobb, Kim M.; Lengaigne, Matthieu; McPhaden, Michael J.; Stuecker, Malte F.; Stein, Karl; Wittenberg, Andrew T.; Yun, Kyung-Sook; Bayr, Tobias; Chen, Han-Ching; Chikamoto, Yoshimitsu; Dewitte, Boris; Dommenget, Dietmar; Grothe, Pamela; Guilyardi, Eric; Ham, Yoo-Geun; Hayashi, Michiya; Ineson, Sarah; Kang, Daehyun; Kim, Sunyong; Kim, WonMoo; Lee, June-Yi; Li, Tim; Luo, Jing-Jia; McGregor, Shayne; Planton, Yann; Power, Scott; Rashid, Harun; Ren, Hong-Li; Santoso, Agus; Takahashi, Ken; Todd, Alexander; Wang, Guomin; Wang, Guojian; Xie, Ruihuang; Yang, Woo-Hyun; Yeh, Sang-Wook; Yoon, Jinho; Zeller, Elke; Zhang, Xuebin (July 2018). "El Niño–Southern Oscillation complexity" (PDF). Nature. 559 (7715): 535–545. Bibcode:2018Natur.559..535T. doi:10.1038/s41586-018-0252-6. PMID 30046070. S2CID 50784105.
- Wang, Bin; Xiang, Baoqiang; Lee, June-Yi (22 January 2013). "Subtropical High predictability establishes a promising way for monsoon and tropical storm predictions". Proceedings of the National Academy of Sciences. 110 (8): 2718–2722. Bibcode:2013PNAS..110.2718W. doi:10.1073/pnas.1214626110. ISSN 0027-8424. PMC 3581955. PMID 23341624.
- Lee, June-Yi; Wang, Bin (January 2014). "Future change of global monsoon in the CMIP5". Climate Dynamics. 42 (1–2): 101–119. Bibcode:2014ClDy...42..101L. doi:10.1007/s00382-012-1564-0. S2CID 129777682.
- Lee, June-Yi; Wang, Bin; Wheeler, Matthew C.; Fu, Xiouhua; Waliser, Duane E.; Kang, In-Sik (January 2013). "Real-time multivariate indices for the boreal summer intraseasonal oscillation over the Asian summer monsoon region". Climate Dynamics. 40 (1–2): 493–509. Bibcode:2013ClDy...40..493L. doi:10.1007/s00382-012-1544-4. S2CID 55694944.

== Awards and honors ==
In 2018 Lee received the Climate Change Grand Leaders Award from the Climate Change Center. in 2020 she received the 30th Science and Technology Award from the Korean Federation of Science and Technology Society, in recognition of her paper on the 2016 heat wave in Korea. In 2021 she was named scientist of the year by the Korean Science Journalists Association.
