= Kyung-Ja Ha =

Climate physicist from South Korea

- Citizenship: South Korea
- Education: Pusan National University (B.S.), Seoul National University(M.S.), Yonsei University (Ph.D)
- Scientific career
- Fields: Climate physics, Climate change sciences, Monsoon dynamics, Planetary boundary layer modeling, Hydroclimate, Tropical-extratropical interaction
- Website: IBS Center for Climate Physics; Pusan National University GMCL

Kyung-Ja Ha is a climate physicist from South Korea. She has been a professor in the IBS Center for Climate Physics since 2017 and the Department of Atmospheric Science at Pusan National University since 1994, and has led the Global Monsoon Climate Lab(GMCL) since 2011. Her research interests include climate physics, monsoon dynamics, planetary boundary layer modeling, hydroclimate, and tropical-extratropical interaction. Prof. Ha's work has been cited about 7,800 times, with an h-index of 46 and an i10-index of 160. She served as president of the Korean Meteorological Society from 2022 to 2023, and has been involved in advisory roles at the Presidential Advisory Council on Science and Technology of South Korea(2022~2023). Currently, she is co-chair of the Expert Team on Climate Impact on Monsoon Weather in the WMO/WWRP Monsoon Panel since 2017, executive editor at Climate Dynamics Journals since 2021, and chair of the Local Advisory Committee of the 2024 Asia Oceania Geosciences Society. Also, She is chair of local organizing committee for BACO25. Through her research and leadership roles, she has contributed to the understanding of monsoon systems and climate dynamics.

== Education ==
She received a B.S. and an M.S. at Pusan National University and Seoul National University, respectively. She received a Ph.D. from Yonsei University in 1992.

== Research Interests ==
Her main research areas are monsoon climate, climate dynamics, and global hydroclimate change. She is the director of the Research Center for Climate Sciences at Pusan National University, which she led from 2014 to 2023. In addition to her research work, she has served in various leadership roles, including as Vice Chair of the National Committee of Future Earth in Korea, and as a board member and auditor for the APEC Climate Center.

== Career ==
She has been a professor at Pusan National University in South Korea since 1994. She has been honored with numerous awards, including the Excellent Scientist Korea Nobel Science Award in 2022 and the Unjae Academy Award from the Korean Meteorological Society in 2019. Her extensive publication record, with over 6,800 citations of her work according to Google Scholar, further attests to the impact of her research.

- 1984–1985: Research assistant at Yonsei University
- 1992–1993: Researcher, Institute for Basic Science, Yonsei University
- 1993: post-doctoral position at MRI/JMA, Japan (supervisor: Tatsushi Tokioka)
- 1994–present: Prof. of Atmospheric Sciences, Pusan Nat. Univ., Korea
- 1996: Visiting scholar CSRP at Texas A&M University (work with Prof. Gerald North), USA
- 1999–2000: Visiting assistant professor at College of Ocean & Atmospheric Sciences (COAS)/OSU (supervisor: Prof. Larry Mahrt), USA
- 2002–2003: Department Chair, Department of Atmospheric Sciences, College of Natural Sciences, Pusan National University
- 2002.01-2004.07: Committee Member, Committee of Public Relation, Pusan National University
- 2002–2004: Director, Women's studies Center, Pusan National University, Korea
- 2002–2005: Courtesy prof. of COAS, Oregon State Univ. USA
- 2003.05~2007.04: Committee Member, Budget Planning Committee, Ministerial Advisory Council, Ministry of Science and Technology
- 2003.09–2009.06: Director of Busan Women in Scientist and Engineers (Busan WISE) Center
- 2004–2005: Chief of education committee of Korean Meteorological Society
- 2004–2007: Minister Advisory Committee of Ministry of Science & Technology
- 2004–2014: Board Member of Korean Meteorological Society
- 2004.12-2005.08: Center Director, Busan Center for Youth Science and Technology
- 2005.09–2008.10: Committee Member, Central Council for Gifted Education Promotion, Ministry of Education and Human Resources Development
- 2005–2011: Auditor, APEC Climate Center, Busan, Korea
- 2006–2009: President of a branch for Busan & Kyungnam region, The Association of Korean Women Scientists and Engineering
- 2008: Chair of subdivision on fundraising, Local Advisory Committee of 2008 Asia Oceania Geosciences Society
- 2009–2011: Auditor, The Network of Promising Women Engineers & Scientists
- 2010: Lead author, chapter 5, Korean Climate Change Assessment Report
- 2010–2011: Vise President, The Association of Korean Woman Scientists and Engineers(KWSE)
- 2010.08–2011.08: Advisor, Policy Advisory Committee, Korea Meteorological Administration
- 2010.12–2012.05: Advisor, The Korean Federation of Science and Technology (KOFST)
- 2010–2016: Member of the 8, 9, 10th Korea-China Basic Science Exchange Committee (NRF-NSFC)
- 2011.01–2014.08: Board member, APEC Climate Center, Busan, Korea
- 2011–2017: Principal Investigator, Global Research Laboratory on "Global monsoon climate change", Korea national research foundation
- 2012: Committee, East Asian Climate(EAC)
- 2012–2013: Vice-president, Korean Meteorological Society, Korea
- 2013.01–2015.12: Co-Director, WISET Southeast Regional Center, Pusan National University
- 2014–2023: Director, Research Center for Climate Sciences, PNU, Korea
- 2014–present: Lead author, chapter 10, Korean Climate Change Assessment Report
- 2015–2023: Vice President, Busan-Ulsan Branch, Korean Federation of Science and Technology Societies (KOFST)
- 2016–2017: Vice-president, Korean Meteorological Society, Korea
- 2016.03–2019.02: Committee Member, Steering Committee for Science Education Standards Development for Future Generations, KOFAC
- 2016–present: Fellow, The Korean Academy of Science and Technology(KAST). Member of Steering committee on Science division of KAST
- 2016–present: Member, Korea committee of "Future Earth", ICSU
- 2017.01–2018.12: Committee member of Expert Committee on Energy and Environment, Korea National Science and Technology Council
- 2017–present: Professor, IBS Center for Climate and Physics
- 2017–present: Chair, Environmental Safe Division, Advisory Committee for National Life Science, KOFST
- 2017–present: WMO/WWRP Monsoon Panel, co-chair of Expert Team on Climate Impact on Monsoon Weather
- 2018–2019: President, Association of Women Professors, Pusan National University
- 2018–2020: Co-chair, Local Advisory Committee of 2020 Asia Oceania Geosciences Society
- 2018–2020: Vice-president, Korea Geoscience Union
- 2018–2021: Board member, The Busan National Science Museum
- 2020–2022: Advisory committee, Presidential Advisory Council on Science and Technology
- 2020–2024: Chair, Local Advisory Committee of 2024 Asia Oceania Geosciences Society
- 2021: Senior vice President of Korean Meteorological Society
- 2021: Co-Chair, The 22nd Northeastern Asian Symposium(on Approaches for Future Earth in Northeast Asia – Climate Change and Its Effects)
- 2021–2023: Committee Member, Science and Technology Promotion Council, Busan (3rd and 4th Terms)
- 2022–2023: President of Korean Meteorological Society
- 2022–present: PI in Korea, A3 foresight program(with Prof. Wenjie Dong in China, and Prof. Masahiro Watanabe in Japan)
- 2022–present: Advisory committee, Ministry of Environment
- 2022–present: Advisory Board Member, Supercomputing Center (Specialized Center), Ministry of Science and ICT
- 2022.4-2025.3 Outside Director, Nonghyup Financial Group Inc.
- 2023–present: Committee Member, Busan Regional Industry-Academia Cooperation Council
- 2023–present: Committee Member, Research Advisory Committee, Busan Development Institute(BDI)
- 2023–present: Committee Member, Science and Technology Distinguished Service Medal Review Committee, Ministry of Science and ICT
- 2023–present: chair, Local Organizing Committee of BACO25(IUGG 3 societies)
- 2025.1-present: Advisory committee, the Basic Research Promotion Council of the Ministry of Science and ICT
- 2025.1.1-2028.12.31: Member, the Global Precipitation EXperiment (GPEX) Lighthouse Activity Scientific Steering Group, World Climate Research Programme(WCRP)

== Honors and awards ==
- 2001: Songcheon Award (Best Academic Award), The Korean Meteorological Society
- 2003: Honor Award, Korea Ministry of Science & Technology
- 2008: Best Research Award, Korea Ministry of Education, Science & Technology
- 2011: Global Research Laboratory fund, Korea National Research Fund, for years of 2011–2017
- 2011: Korea 100 top researcher award, National Science & Technology Council
- 2011: The premium professor award, Pusan National University, Busan, Korea
- 2012: National Medal(Jinbo), Order of Science and Technology Merit
- 2012: The 11th Busan Science & Technology Award, Busan, Korea
- 2016: Editor contribution award, IAP/CAS, China
- 2019: Honor Award, Minister, Ministry of Science and ICT
- 2019: Unjae Academy Award, Korean Meteorological Society
- 2021: 64th Busan Cultural Award
- 2022: Excellent Scientist, Korea Nobel Science Award
- 2022: National Medal(Doyak), Order of Science and Technology Merit

== Editorial Affiliations ==
- 2000–2003: Editor in chief, editorial board of "Atmosphere", bulletin of Korean Meteorological Society
- 2008: Editor in Atmospheric Science, Vol 16, Advances in Geosciences, World Scientific
- 2008–present: Editor, Atmospheric Oceanic Sciences Letter, IAP/China Academy of Science
- 2016–2017: Lead Guest editor, special issue on "Asian Monsoon climate change", Asia-Pacific Journal of Atmospheric Sciences
- 2017–2018: "Atmosphere" open access, Guest Editor on Special Issue on Monsoons
- 2017–present: Editor, the Earth and Environmental Sciences section of the board, Nature Scientific Report
- 2021–present: Executive editor, Climate Dynamics

== Publications ==
- Publications - GMCL, Pusan National University

== Books ==
- Kyung-Ja Ha (2002). Atmospheric Thermodynamics. Sigma Press, Seoul. (in Korean)
- Young-Seop Kim; Kyung-Ik Kim; Kyung-Ja Ha; Hyang-Hee Um (2003). Essentials of Atmospheric Dynamics (Korean translation). Sigma Press, Seoul, 310 pp. (in Korean; translated work)
- Kyung-Ja Ha; Hyo-Sang Jung (2005). The Moving Laboratory. Lux Media (Lux Kids), Seoul. (in Korean)
- Jeong-Seon Kim; Kyung-Ja Ha; Yoon-Kyung Ha (2015). Vivid Science Issues 21. L Company, Seoul, 280 pp. (in Korean)
- Chih-Pei Chang; Kyung-Ja Ha; Richard H. Johnson; Daehyun Kim; Gabriel N. C. Lau; Bin Wang (eds.) (2019). The Multiscale Global Monsoon System. World Scientific, Singapore, 420 pp.
- Lin Wang; Haishan Chen; Jasti S. Chowdary; Kyung-Ja Ha; Yoshiyuki Kajikawa; Gill Martin (2021). The Asian Monsoon (eBook). Frontiers in Earth Science / Frontiers in Environmental Science, 230 pp.
- Kyung-Ja Ha; Kyung-Ik Kim (2024). Essentials of Atmospheric Science (3rd ed., 2nd printing). Pusan National University Press, Busan. (in Korean)
- Jiphyun Network (2024). The First Climate Science Class. Wisdom House, Seoul, 464 pp. (in Korean; contributing author)
- Kyung-Ja Ha; Ga-Young Yoo; Soo-Jong Jung; Tae-Won Park; Ja-Ho Koo (2024). Climate Change and Environmental Ecology. Cmass, Seoul, 200 pp. (in Korean)
- Kyung-Ja Ha; Gyu-Young Ko; Kyung-Cheol Gong; Young-Jin Kim; Gil-Seong Park; In-Gyu Park; Yong-Min Cho; Eun-Mi Chae (2025). Nine Experts on Ideas That Open Tomorrow. Gimmyoung Publishers, Seoul, 268 pp. (in Korean)
