= List of universities in Vietnam =

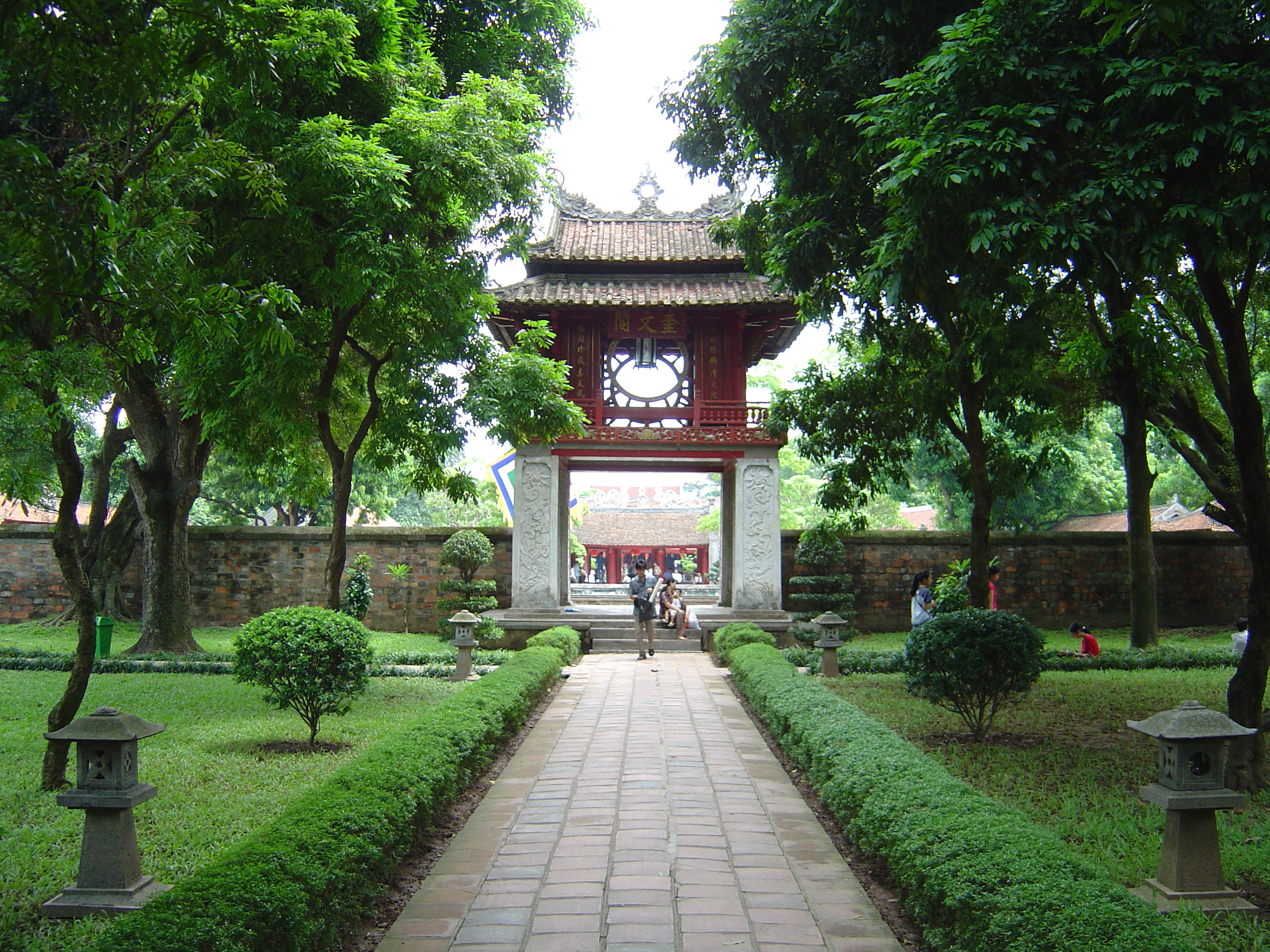
Temple of Literature, Hanoi, the temple hosts the Imperial Academy (Quốc Tử Giám, 國子監), Vietnam's first university

This is a list of universities in Vietnam. The public higher education system in Vietnam basically consists of 2 levels: university system (called đại học) and university (usually specialize in a fixed scientific field; called trường đại học). University systems in Vietnam consist of many member institutions, with each institution equivalent to a regular specialized university. In addition, in Vietnam, there are private universities operating under the management of the Ministry of Education and Training (in terms of expertise) and private enterprises (in terms of operation and management). Private universities in Vietnam are usually multidisciplinary universities, but in terms of decentralization in the education system, these private universities are only equivalent to a public specialized university.

All universities in Vietnam are managed by a corresponding central authority, most of which are managed by the Ministry of Education and Training. Some are managed by ministries and other government organizations such as the Ministry of Construction, the Ministry of Health, the Vietnam Women's Union, etc. However, these organizations only manage professional issues (consultations, specialized knowledge), and remains in consultation with the Ministry of Education. As for the private universities, all are under the management of the Ministry of Education.

The current Vietnamese government also maintains a national key university policy. This is a list of universities with high achievements and training quality, classified according to the scientific fields that the university offers. These universities will receive more benefits in operation and management, for example: priority to receive support packages to build training programs and facilities, approve projects to open new majors and education programs, being able to educate and self-award a doctoral degree without first approval from the Ministry of Education and Training.

== University systems ==
Vietnam currently exists 7 university systems (đại học) (Note: Roughly equivalent to collegiate universities in other countries), each university system divided into many member universities or constituent colleges (trường đại học), member schools (trường or khoa) or member institutes (viện) specializing in training and researching a specific group of disciplines to create their own strengths. The head of a university is called a director, and the head of a member university is called a rector. All 7 university systems are in the group of national key universities.

=== National universities ===
Vietnam National University (VNU; Đại học Quốc gia) is a special hierarchy of the Vietnamese higher education system. VNUs are not under the management of the Ministry of Education or any other organization, but operate completely independently, only under the control of the Prime Minister of Vietnam.

==== Vietnam National University, Hanoi ====
No.	Abbreviation	Member	Vietnamese name
1	UET	University of Engineering and Technology	Trường Đại học Công nghệ
2	VNU-UEd	University of Education	Trường Đại học Giáo dục
3	ULIS	University of Languages and International Studies	Trường Đại học Ngoại ngữ
4	HUS	University of Sciences	Trường Đại học Khoa học Tự nhiên
5	HUSSH	University of Social Sciences and Humanities	Trường Đại học Khoa học Xã hội và Nhân văn
6	UEB	University of Economics and Business	Trường Đại học Kinh tế
7	VNU-UMP	University of Medicine and Pharmacy	Trường Đại học Y Dược
8	VNU-UL	University of Law	Trường Đại học Luật
9	VJU	Vietnam–Japan University	Trường Đại học Việt Nhật
—	VNU-IS	International School	Trường Quốc tế
—	HSB	School of Business and Management	Trường Quản trị và Kinh doanh
—	SIS	School of Interdisciplinary Sciences	Trường Khoa học liên ngành và Nghệ thuật

==== Vietnam National University, Ho Chi Minh City ====
No.	Abbreviation	Member	Vietnamese name
10	HCMUT	University of Technology	Trường Đại học Bách khoa
11	AGU	An Giang University	Trường Đại học An Giang
12	HCMUS	University of Science	Trường Đại học Khoa học Tự nhiên
13	HCMUSSH	University of Social Sciences and Humanities	Trường Đại học Khoa học Xã hội và Nhân văn
14	HCMIU	International University	Trường Đại học Quốc tế
15	UEL	University of Economics and Law	Trường Đại học Kinh tế – Luật
16	UIT	University of Information Technology	Trường Đại học Công nghệ Thông tin
—	UHS	School of Medicine (Note: Development plan up to 2030: University of Health Sciences)	Khoa Y
—	SPAS	School of Political and Administration Sciences	Khoa Chính trị – Hành chính
—	–	Branch of VNU-HCM in Ben Tre Province	Phân hiệu Đại học Quốc gia TP.HCM tại Bến Tre
—	HCMIER	Institute of Environment and Resource (Note: Development plan up to 2030: University of Environment Technology)	Viện Môi trường và Tài nguyên

=== Regional universities ===
Regional universities (đại học vùng) are university systems under the management of the Ministry of Education and Training. Their organization and operation are similar to VNUs, but the directors will work with the Minister of MOET instead of the Prime Minister. Can Tho University is completing the project of upgrading to the fourth regional university.

==== University of Da Nang ====
No.	Abbreviation	Member	Vietnamese name
17	DUT	University of Technology	Trường Đại học Bách khoa
18	DUE	University of Economics	Trường Đại học Kinh tế
19	DUEd	University of Education	Trường Đại học Sư phạm
20	DNUTE	University of Technology and Education	Trường Đại học Sư phạm Kỹ thuật
21	VKU	Vietnam–Korea University of Information and Communication Technology (Note: Co-administered by the Vietnamese Ministry of Education and the Korean Ministry of Education.)	Trường Đại học Công nghệ Thông tin và Truyền thông Việt – Hàn
22	DNUFL	University of Foreign Languages	Trường Đại học Ngoại ngữ
—	–	Branch of the University of Da Nang in Kon Tum Province	Phân hiệu Đại học Đà Nẵng tại Kon Tum
—	–	School of Medicine and Pharmacy	Khoa Y Dược
—	–	School of Physical Education	Khoa Giáo dục Thể chất
—	–	School of National Defense and Security Training	Khoa Giáo dục Quốc phòng và An ninh

==== Hue University ====
No.	Abbreviation	Member	Vietnamese name
23	HUSC	University Science College	Trường Đại học Khoa học
24	HUE	University of Economics	Trường Đại học Kinh tế
25	HUL	University of Law	Trường Đại học Luật
26	HUA	University of Arts	Trường Đại học Nghệ thuật
27	HUFLIS	University of Foreign Languages and International Studies	Trường Đại học Ngoại ngữ
28	HUAF	University of Agriculture and Forestry	Trường Đại học Nông Lâm
29	HUEd	University of Education	Trường Đại học Sư phạm
30	YDH	University of Medicine and Pharmacy	Trường Đại học Y Dược
—	–	School of Tourism	Trường Du lịch
—	–	Faculty of Technology and Engineering	Khoa Kỹ thuật và Công nghệ
—	–	Faculty of International Studies	Khoa Quốc tế
—	–	Branch of Hue University in Quang Tri Province	Phân hiệu Đại học Huế tại Quảng Trị

==== Thai Nguyen University ====
No.	Abbreviation	Member	Vietnamese name
31	TNUICT	University of Information and Communication Technology	Trường Đại học Công nghệ thông tin và Truyền thông
32	TNUS	University of Science	Trường Đại học Khoa học
33	TNUEBA	University of Economics and Business Administration	Trường Đại học Kinh tế và Quản trị kinh doanh
34	TNUT	University of Technology	Trường Đại học Kỹ thuật Công nghiệp
35	TNUAF	University of Agriculture and Forestry	Trường Đại học Nông Lâm
36	TNUEd	University of Education	Trường Đại học Sư phạm
37	TNUMP	University of Medicine and Pharmacy	Trường Đại học Y Dược
—	–	School of Foreign Languages	Trường Ngoại ngữ
—	–	Faculty of International Studies	Khoa Quốc tế
—	–	Branch of Thai Nguyen University in Lao Cai Province	Phân hiệu Đại học Thái Nguyên tại Lào Cai
—	–	Branch of Thai Nguyen University in Ha Giang Province	Phân hiệu Đại học Thái Nguyên tại Hà Giang

=== Specialized university systems ===
On December 5, 2022, the Prime Minister issued Decision No. 1512/QD-TTg on the transformation of Trường Đại học Bách khoa Hà Nội into Đại học Bách khoa Hà Nội. Accordingly, Hanoi University of Science and Technology became the sixth university system in Vietnam.

Currently, some universities such as National Economics University, University of Economics Ho Chi Minh City are preparing projects to become university systems, and are waiting for the approval of Ministry of Education and Training.

No.	University system	Abbreviation	School	Vietnamese name
38	Hanoi University of Science and Technology: Abbreviation: HUST; Vietnamese: Đại học Bách khoa Hà Nội	SoICT	School of Information and Communication Technology	Trường Công nghệ Thông tin và Truyền thông
38	Hanoi University of Science and Technology: Abbreviation: HUST; Vietnamese: Đại học Bách khoa Hà Nội	SMS	School of Material Science	Trường Vật liệu
38	Hanoi University of Science and Technology: Abbreviation: HUST; Vietnamese: Đại học Bách khoa Hà Nội	SME	School of Mechanical Engineering	Trường Cơ khí
38	Hanoi University of Science and Technology: Abbreviation: HUST; Vietnamese: Đại học Bách khoa Hà Nội	SCLS	School of Chemistry and Life Science	Trường Hóa và Khoa học sự sống
38	Hanoi University of Science and Technology: Abbreviation: HUST; Vietnamese: Đại học Bách khoa Hà Nội	SEEE	School of Electrical and Electronic Engineering	Trường Điện – Điện tử
38	Hanoi University of Science and Technology: Abbreviation: HUST; Vietnamese: Đại học Bách khoa Hà Nội	SEM	School of Economics and Management	Trường Kinh tế
39	National Economics University: Abbreviation: NEU; Vietnamese: Đại học Kinh tế Quốc dân	NCB	College of Business	Trường Kinh doanh
39	National Economics University: Abbreviation: NEU; Vietnamese: Đại học Kinh tế Quốc dân	NCEPA	College of Economics and Public Administration	Trường Kinh tế và Quản lý công
39	National Economics University: Abbreviation: NEU; Vietnamese: Đại học Kinh tế Quốc dân	NCT	College of Technology	Trường Công nghệ
40	University of Economics Ho Chi Minh City: Abbreviation: UEH; Vietnamese: Đại học Kinh tế TP. Hồ Chí Minh	CoB	College of Business	Trường Kinh doanh
40	University of Economics Ho Chi Minh City: Abbreviation: UEH; Vietnamese: Đại học Kinh tế TP. Hồ Chí Minh	CELG	College of Economics, Law and Government	Trường Kinh tế, Luật và Quản lý nhà nước
40	University of Economics Ho Chi Minh City: Abbreviation: UEH; Vietnamese: Đại học Kinh tế TP. Hồ Chí Minh	CTD	College of Technology and Design	Trường Công nghệ và Thiết kế
40	University of Economics Ho Chi Minh City: Abbreviation: UEH; Vietnamese: Đại học Kinh tế TP. Hồ Chí Minh	–	Branch of UEH in Vinh Long Province	Phân hiệu Đại học Kinh tế TP.HCM tại Vĩnh Long

=== Private university systems ===
On October 7, 2024, the Deputy Prime Minister issued Decision No. 1115/QĐ-TTg on the transformation of Trường Đại học Duy Tân into Đại học Duy Tân. Accordingly, Duy Tan University became the first private university system and the eighth university system in Vietnam generally.

After six months, in April 2025, the Prime Minister issued Decision No. 775/QĐ-TTg on the transformation of Trường Đại học Phenikaa into Đại học Phenikaa. Phenikaa University became the tenth private university systems, after the transformation of National Economics University.

No.	University system	Abbreviation	School	Vietnamese name
41	Duy Tan University: Abbreviation: DTU; Vietnamese: Đại học Duy Tân	SET	School of Engineering and Technology	Trường Công nghệ và Kỹ thuật
41	Duy Tan University: Abbreviation: DTU; Vietnamese: Đại học Duy Tân	SBE	School of Business & Economics	Trường Kinh tế & Kinh doanh
41	Duy Tan University: Abbreviation: DTU; Vietnamese: Đại học Duy Tân	SCS	School of Computer and Science	Trường Khoa học máy tính
41	Duy Tan University: Abbreviation: DTU; Vietnamese: Đại học Duy Tân	LHSS	School of Languages – Social Humanities	Trường Ngôn ngữ & Xã hội Nhân văn
41	Duy Tan University: Abbreviation: DTU; Vietnamese: Đại học Duy Tân	HTI	Hospitality and Tourism School	Trường Du lịch
41	Duy Tan University: Abbreviation: DTU; Vietnamese: Đại học Duy Tân	IS	International School	Trường Đào tạo Quốc tế
41	Duy Tan University: Abbreviation: DTU; Vietnamese: Đại học Duy Tân	CMP	College of Medicine & Pharmacy	Trường Y Dược
42	Phenikaa University: Abbreviation: PKA; Vietnamese: Đại học Phenikaa	PSE	Phenikaa School of Engineering	Trường Kỹ thuật Phenikaa
42	Phenikaa University: Abbreviation: PKA; Vietnamese: Đại học Phenikaa	–	Phenikaa School of Economics	Trường Kinh tế Phenikaa
42	Phenikaa University: Abbreviation: PKA; Vietnamese: Đại học Phenikaa	–	Phenikaa School of Information Technology	Trường Công nghệ thông tin Phenikaa
42	Phenikaa University: Abbreviation: PKA; Vietnamese: Đại học Phenikaa	–	Phenikaa School of Medicine and Pharmacy	Trường Y – Dược Phenikaa
42	Phenikaa University: Abbreviation: PKA; Vietnamese: Đại học Phenikaa	–	Phenikaa School of Foreign Languages and Social Sciences	Trường Ngoại ngữ - Khoa học xã hội Phenikaa

== Public universities at central level ==
List of universities in Vietnam divided by management organizations including ministries, associations or central-level special units in Vietnam.

Universities in bold are on the national key university list.

=== Ministry of Education and Training ===
Universities governed by the Ministry of Education and Training
No.	Location	English name	Vietnamese name	Abbreviation
43	Hanoi	National Academy of Education Management	Học viện Quản lý Giáo dục	NAEM
44	Hanoi	Hanoi University	Trường Đại học Hà Nội	HANU
45	Hanoi	University of Transportation and Communication	Trường Đại học Giao thông Vận tải	UTC
46	Hanoi	Hanoi University of Mining and Geology	Trường Đại học Mỏ – Địa chất Hà Nội	HUMG
47	Hanoi	Hanoi Open University	Trường Đại học Mở Hà Nội	HOU
48	Hanoi	Hanoi University of Industrial Fine Arts	Trường Đại học Mỹ thuật Công nghiệp	UAD
49	Hanoi	Foreign Trade University	Trường Đại học Ngoại thương	FTU
50	Hanoi	**Hanoi National University of Education**	**Trường Đại học Sư phạm Hà Nội**	**HNUE**
51	Hanoi	Hanoi Pedagogical University 2	Trường Đại học Sư phạm Hà Nội 2	HPU2
52	Hanoi	National University of Arts Education	Trường Đại học Sư phạm Nghệ thuật Trung ương	NUAE
53	Hanoi	Hanoi University of Physical Education and Sports	Trường Đại học Sư phạm Thể dục thể thao Hà Nội	HNUPES
54	Hanoi	Thuongmai University (Note: University of Commerce, Commerce University)	Trường Đại học Thương mại	TMU
55	Hanoi	Hanoi University of Civil Engineering	Trường Đại học Xây dựng Hà Nội	HUCE
56	Ho Chi Minh City	Ho Chi Minh City University of Law	Trường Đại học Luật Thành phố Hồ Chí Minh	ULaw
57	Ho Chi Minh City	Ho Chi Minh City University of Agriculture and Forestry	Trường Đại học Nông Lâm Thành phố Hồ Chí Minh	NLU / HCMUAF
58	Ho Chi Minh City	Ho Chi Minh City Open University	Trường Đại học Mở Thành phố Hồ Chí Minh	HCMOU
59	Ho Chi Minh City	Ho Chi Minh City University of Technology and Education	Trường Đại học Sư phạm Kỹ thuật Thành phố Hồ Chí Minh	HCMUTE
60	Ho Chi Minh City	**Ho Chi Minh City University of Education**	**Trường Đại học Sư phạm Thành phố Hồ Chí Minh**	**HCMUE**
61	Ho Chi Minh City	Ho Chi Minh City University of Physical Education and Sports	Trường Đại học Sư phạm Thể dục Thể thao Thành phố Hồ Chí Minh	HCMUPES
62	Cần Thơ	**Can Tho University**	**Trường Đại học Cần Thơ**	**CTU**
63	Lâm Đồng	Dalat University	Trường Đại học Đà Lạt	DLU
64	Đồng Tháp	Dong Thap University	Trường Đại học Đồng Tháp	DTU
65	Kiên Giang	Kien Giang University	Trường Đại học Kiên Giang	KGU
66	Khánh Hòa	Nha Trang University	Trường Đại học Nha Trang	NTU
67	Bình Định	Quy Nhon University	Trường Đại học Quy Nhơn	QNU
68	Hưng Yên	Hung Yen University of Technology and Education	Trường Đại học Sư phạm Kỹ thuật Hưng Yên	HYUTE
69	Sơn La	Tay Bac University (Note: University of the Northwest)	Trường Đại học Tây Bắc	TBU
70	Đắk Lắk	Tay Nguyen University (Note: University of the Central Highlands)	Trường Đại học Tây Nguyên	TNU
71	Bình Dương	Vietnamese–German University (Note: Co-administered by the Vietnamese Ministry of Education and the German Ministry of Education.)	Trường Đại học Việt Đức	VGU
72	Nghệ An	**Vinh University**	**Trường Đại học Vinh**	**VU**

=== Ministry of Health ===
Universities governed by the Ministry of Health
No.	Location	English name	Vietnamese name	Abbreviation
73	Hanoi	**Hanoi Medical University**	**Trường Đại học Y Hà Nội**	**HMU**
74	Hanoi	Hanoi University of Pharmacy	Trường Đại học Dược Hà Nội	HUP
75	Hanoi	Hanoi University of Public Health	Trường Đại học Y tế Công cộng	HUPH
76	Hanoi	Vietnam University of Traditional Medicine	Học viện Y – Dược học cổ truyền Việt Nam	VUTM
77	Ho Chi Minh City	**Ho Chi Minh City University of Medicine and Pharmacy**	**Đại học Y Dược Thành phố Hồ Chí Minh**	**YDS**
78	Haiphong	Haiphong University of Medicine and Pharmacy	Trường Đại học Y Dược Hải Phòng	HPMU
79	Thái Bình	Thai Binh University of Medicine and Pharmacy	Trường Đại học Y Dược Thái Bình	TBUMP
80	Cần Thơ	Can Tho University of Medicine and Pharmacy	Trường Đại học Y Dược Cần Thơ	CTUMP
81	Nam Định	Nam Dinh University of Nursing	Trường Đại học Điều dưỡng Nam Định	NDUN
82	Hải Dương	Hai Duong Medical Technology University	Trường Đại học Kỹ thuật Y tế Hải Dương	HMTU
83	Da Nang	Da Nang University of Medical Technology and Pharmacy	Trường Đại học Kỹ thuật Y Dược Đà Nẵng	DUMTP

=== Ministry of Culture, Sports and Tourism ===
Universities governed by the Ministry of Culture, Sports and Tourism
No.	Location	English name	Vietnamese name	Abbreviation
84	Hanoi	Vietnam National Academy of Music	Học viện Âm nhạc Quốc gia Việt Nam	VNAM
85	Hanoi	Vietnam Academy of Dance	Học viện Múa Việt Nam	VNAD
86	Hanoi	Hanoi University of Culture	Trường Đại học Văn hoá Hà Nội	HUC
87	Hanoi	Vietnam University of Fine Arts	Trường Đại học Mỹ thuật Việt Nam	VNUFA
88	Hanoi	Hanoi Academy of Theatre and Cinema	Trường Đại học Sân khấu Điện ảnh Hà Nội	SKDA
89	Ho Chi Minh City	Ho Chi Minh City Conservatory of Music	Nhạc viện Thành phố Hồ Chí Minh	HCMCONS
90	Ho Chi Minh City	Ho Chi Minh City University of Culture	Trường Đại học Văn hoá Thành phố Hồ Chí Minh	VHS
91	Ho Chi Minh City	Ho Chi Minh City University of Fine Arts	Trường Đại học Mỹ thuật Thành phố Hồ Chí Minh	HCMUFA
92	Ho Chi Minh City	The University of Theatre and Cinema Ho Chi Minh City	Trường Đại học Sân khấu Điện ảnh Thành phố Hồ Chí Minh	SKDAHCM
93	Ho Chi Minh City	University of Sports Ho Chi Minh City	Trường Đại học Thể dục Thể thao Thành phố Hồ Chí Minh	USH
94	Huế	Hue Academy of Music	Học viện Âm nhạc Huế	–
95	Bắc Ninh	Bac Ninh University of Physical Education and Sports	Trường Đại học Thể dục Thể thao Bắc Ninh	UPES1
96	Da Nang	Da Nang Sports University	Trường Đại học Thể dục Thể thao Đà Nẵng	DSU

=== Ministry of Industry and Trade ===
Universities governed by the Ministry of Industry and Trade
No.	Location	English name	Vietnamese name	Abbreviation
97	Ho Chi Minh City	Industrial University of Ho Chi Minh City	Trường Đại học Công nghiệp Thành phố Hồ Chí Minh	IUH
98	Ho Chi Minh City	Ho Chi Minh City University of Industry and Trade	Trường Đại học Công Thương Thành phố Hồ Chí Minh	HUIT
99	Hanoi	Hanoi University of Industry	Trường Đại học Công nghiệp Hà Nội	HaUI
100	Hanoi	Viet – Hung Industrial University	Trường Đại học Công nghiệp Việt – Hung	VIU
101	Hanoi	Electric Power University	Trường Đại học Điện lực	EPU
102	Quảng Ninh	Quang Ninh University of Industry	Trường Đại học Công nghiệp Quảng Ninh	QNUI
103	Phú Thọ	Viet Tri University of Industry	Trường Đại học Công nghiệp Việt Trì	VUI
104	Nam Định	University of Economics – Technology for Industries	Trường Đại học Kinh tế – Kỹ thuật Công nghiệp	UNETI
105	Hải Dương	Sao Do University	Trường Đại học Sao Đỏ	SDU

=== Ministry of Transportation ===
No.	Location	English name	Vietnamese name	Abbreviation
106	Hanoi	University of Transport Technology	Trường Đại học Công nghệ Giao thông Vận tải	UTT
107	Ho Chi Minh City	University of Transportation Ho Chi Minh City	Trường Đại học Giao thông Vận tải Thành phố Hồ Chí Minh	UTH
108	Ho Chi Minh City	Vietnam Aviation Academy	Học viện Hàng không Việt Nam	VAA
109	Hải Phòng	**Vietnam Maritime University**	**Trường Đại học Hàng hải Việt Nam**	**VMU**

=== Ministry of Construction ===
University governed by the Ministry of Construction
No.	Location	English name	Vietnamese name	Abbreviation
110	Hanoi	Hanoi Architectural University	Trường Đại học Kiến trúc Hà Nội	HAU
111	Ho Chi Minh City	University of Architecture Ho Chi Minh City	Trường Đại học Kiến trúc Thành phố Hồ Chí Minh	UAH
112	Phú Yên	Mien Trung University of Civil Engineering (Note: Central Vietnam University of Civil Engineering)	Trường Đại học Xây dựng Miền Trung	MUCE
113	Vĩnh Long	Mien Tay Construction University (Note: Southwestern Vietnam University of Civil Engineering)	Trường Đại học Xây dựng Miền Tây	MTU

=== Ministry of Home Affairs ===
Universities governed by the Ministry of Home Affairs
No.	Location	English name	Vietnamese name	Abbreviation
114	Hanoi	University of Labour and Social Affairs	Trường Đại học Lao động – Xã hội	ULSA
115	Hanoi	**National Academy of Public Administration** (Note: From Jan 1st 2023, the Hanoi University of Home Affairs is merged into the Vietnam National Academy of Public Administration)	**Học viện Hành chính Quốc gia**	**NAPA**
116	Nam Định	Nam Dinh University of Technology and Education	Trường Đại học Sư phạm Kỹ thuật Nam Định	NDUTE
117	Vĩnh Long	Vinh Long University of Technology and Education	Trường Đại học Sư phạm Kỹ thuật Vĩnh Long	VLUTE
118	Nghệ An	Vinh University of Technology and Education	Trường Đại học Sư phạm Kỹ thuật Vinh	VinhUTE

=== Ministry of Agriculture and Rural Development ===
Universities governed by the Ministry of Agriculture and Rural Development
No.	Location	English name	Vietnamese name	Abbreviation
119	Hanoi	**Vietnam National University of Agriculture**	**Học viện Nông nghiệp Việt Nam**	**VNUA**
120	Hanoi	Vietnam National University of Forestry	Trường Đại học Lâm nghiệp	VNUF
121	Hanoi	Thuyloi University (Note: University of Water Resources)	Trường Đại học Thuỷ lợi	TLU
122	Bắc Giang	Bac Giang University of Agriculture and Forestry	Trường Đại học Nông Lâm Bắc Giang	BGUAF

=== Ministry of Finance ===
No.	Location	English name	Vietnamese name	Abbreviation
123	Hanoi	Academy of Finance	Học viện Tài chính	AOF
124	Ho Chi Minh City	University of Finance and Marketing	Trường Đại học Tài chính – Marketing	UFM
125	Quảng Ngãi	University of Finance and Accountancy	Trường Đại học Tài chính – Kế toán	UFA
126	Hưng Yên	University of Finance and Business Administration	Trường Đại học Tài chính – Quản trị kinh doanh	UFBA

=== Vietnam Buddhist Sangha ===
The Vietnam Buddhist Sangha is the national organization of Buddhism Community in Vietnam, only orthodox religious organization in Vietnam that is allowed to organize and train religious studies (Buddhism) programs at undergraduate and graduate levels. The Vietnam Buddhist Academy system is managed independently by the Sangha through the Central Board of Education for Monks and Nuns. The Sangha actively develops training programs and enrollment regulations for each Academy and at the same time reports to the Government on enrollment and training results annually.

No.	Location	English name	Vietnamese name	Abbreviation
127	Hanoi	Vietnam Buddhism Academy in Hanoi	Học viện Phật giáo Việt Nam tại Hà Nội	VBA-HN
128	Ho Chi Minh City	Vietnam Buddhist Academy, Ho Chi Minh City	Học viện Phật giáo Việt Nam tại Thành phố Hồ Chí Minh	VBA-HCM
129	Huế	Vietnam Buddhism Academy in Hue	Học viện Phật giáo Việt Nam tại Huế	VBA-H
130	Cần Thơ	Vietnam Khmer Theravada Buddhist Academy	Học viện Phật giáo Nam tông Khmer	VKTBA

=== Ministry of Natural Resources and Environment ===
No.	Location	English name	Vietnamese name	Abbreviation
131	Hanoi	Hanoi University of Natural Resources and Environment	Trường Đại học Tài nguyên và Môi trường Hà Nội	HUNRE
132	Ho Chi Minh City	Ho Chi Minh City University of Natural Resources and Environment	Trường Đại học Tài nguyên và Môi trường Thành phố Hồ Chí Minh	HCMUNRE

=== State Bank of Vietnam ===
No.	Location	English name	Vietnamese name	Abbreviation
133	Hanoi	Banking Academy of Vietnam	Học viện Ngân hàng	BAV
134	Ho Chi Minh City	Ho Chi Minh City University of Banking	Trường Đại học Ngân hàng Thành phố Hồ Chí Minh	HUB

=== Vietnam General Confederation of Labor ===
No.	Location	English name	Vietnamese name	Abbreviation
135	Hanoi	Vietnam Trade Union University	Trường Đại học Công đoàn	TUU
136	Ho Chi Minh City	Ton Duc Thang University	Trường Đại học Tôn Đức Thắng	TDTU

=== Vietnam Academy of Science and Technology ===
No.	Location	English name	Vietnamese name	Abbreviation
137	Hanoi	Graduate University of Sciences and Technology	Học viện Khoa học và Công nghệ	GUST
138	Hanoi	University of Science and Technology of Hanoi (Note: Established within the framework of the MOU between the Vietnamese and French governments)	Trường Đại học Khoa học và Công nghệ Hà Nội	USTH

=== Other Vietnamese government's organizations ===
No.	Organization	English name	Vietnamese name	Abbreviation	Location
139	Central Committee of the Communist Party of Vietnam	Ho Chi Minh National Academy of Politics	Học viện Chính trị Quốc gia Hồ Chí Minh	HCMA	Hanoi
140	Central Committee of the Communist Party of Vietnam	**Academy of Journalism and Communication** **(Note: Academy of Journalism and Communication is managed by Ho Chi Minh National Academy of Politics.)**	**Học viện Báo chí và Tuyên truyền**	**AJC**	Hanoi
141	Ministry of Planning and Investment	Academy of Policy and Development	Học viện Chính sách và Phát triển	APD	Hanoi
142	Ministry of Foreign Affairs	Diplomatic Academy of Vietnam	Học viện Ngoại giao	DAV	Hanoi
143	Ministry of Information and Communication	Posts and Telecommunications Institute of Technology	Học viện Công nghệ Bưu chính Viễn thông	PTIT	Hanoi
144	Ministry of Justice	Hanoi Law University	Trường Đại học Luật Hà Nội	HLU	Hanoi
145	Vietnam Textile Corporation	Hanoi Industrial Textile Garment University	Trường Đại học Công nghiệp Dệt may Hà Nội	HICT	Hanoi
146	Supreme People's Court of Vietnam	Vietnam Court Academy	Học viện Toà án	VCA	Hanoi
147	Ho Chi Minh Communist Youth Union Central Committee	Vietnam Youth Academy	Học viện Thanh thiếu niên Việt Nam	VYA	Hanoi
148	Central Vietnam Women's Union	Vietnam Women Academy	Học viện Phụ nữ Việt Nam	VWA	Hanoi
149	National Ethnic Committee	Vietnam Academy for Ethnic Minorities	Học viện Dân tộc	VAEM	Hanoi
150	Vietnam Academy of Social Sciences	Graduate Academy of Social Sciences	Học viện Khoa học Xã hội	GASS	Hanoi
151	The Supreme People's Procuracy of Vietnam	Hanoi Procuratorate University	Trường Đại học Kiểm sát Hà Nội	HPU	Hanoi
152	Ministry of Science and Technology	Vietnam Institute of Science Technology and Innovation	Học viện Khoa học, Công nghệ và Đổi mới sáng tạo	VISTI	Hanoi
153	Petrovietnam	Petro Vietnam University	Trường Đại học Dầu khí Việt Nam	PVU	Bà Rịa–Vũng Tàu

== Academies, universities and colleges of the military, police ==
=== Military academies, universities and colleges ===
Military academies and universities are professionally managed by the Ministry of National Defense. The Minister of National Defense sets admission standards for each academy such as candidate's background, entry health, quota,... Meanwhile, the Ministry of Education and Training supports the academies. organize and operate teaching and management activities, as well as on behalf of the Ministry of National Defense, receive input enrollment documents and manage output graduation records.

Academies in bold are on the national key university list.

No.	Location	English name	Vietnamese name
1	Hanoi	Border Guard Academy	Học viện Biên phòng
2	Hanoi	Vietnam People's Army - Political Academy	Học viện Chính trị - Quân đội Nhân dân Việt Nam
3	Hanoi	Military Logistics Academy	Học viện Hậu cần
4	Hanoi	Military Science Academy	Học viện Khoa học Quân sự
5	Hanoi	Military Cryptography Technical Academy	Học viện Kỹ thuật Mật mã Quân sự
6	Hanoi	**Military Technical Academy**	**Học viện Kỹ thuật Quân sự**
7	Hanoi	Air Force – Air Defense Academy	Học viện Phòng không – Không quân
8	Hanoi	**Military Medical Academy**	**Học viện Quân y**
9	Hanoi	National Defense Academy	Học viện Quốc phòng
10	Hanoi	Political Officer's University	Trường Đại học Sĩ quan Chính trị
11	Hanoi	First Army Officer's University – Tran Quoc Tuan University	Trường Đại học Sĩ quan Lục quân 1 – Đại học Võ bị Trần Quốc Tuấn
12	Hanoi	Communications Officer's University	Trường Đại học Sĩ quan Thông tin Liên lạc
13	Hanoi	Artillery Officer's University	Trường Đại học Sĩ quan Pháo binh
14	Hanoi	Chemical Defense Officer's University	Trường Đại học Sĩ quan Phòng hoá
15	Hanoi	Special Agent Force Officer's University	Trường Đại học Sĩ quan Đặc công
16	Hanoi	Military University of Culture - Arts	Trường Đại học Văn hoá Nghệ thuật Quân đội
17	Hanoi	Military Industrial College	Trường Cao đẳng Công nghiệp Quốc phòng
18	Hanoi	College of Automotive Technology and Engineering	Trường Cao đẳng Công nghệ và Kỹ thuật Ô tô
19	Hanoi	Military Medical College 1	Trường Cao đẳng Quân y 1
20	Vĩnh Phúc	Tank - Armor Officer's University	Trường Đại học Sĩ quan Tăng – Thiết giáp
21	Đồng Nai	Second Army Officer's University – Nguyen Hue University	Trường Đại học Sĩ quan Lục quân 2 –Đại học Võ bị Nguyễn Huệ
22	Lâm Đồng	Vietnam Army Academy	Học viện Lục quân
23	Khánh Hòa	Naval Academy	Học viện Hải quân
24	Khánh Hòa	Air Force Officer's University	Trường Đại học Sĩ quan Không quân
25	Bình Dương	Engineer Officer University – Ngo Quyen University	Trường Trường Đại học Sĩ quan Công binh – Đại học Ngô Quyền
26	Ho Chi Minh City	Vinhempich Military Technical Officer University – Tran Dai Nghia University	Trường Đại học Sĩ quan Kỹ thuật Quân sự – Đại học Trần Đại Nghĩa
27	Ho Chi Minh City	Military Medical College 2	Trường Cao đẳng Quân y 2
28	Ho Chi Minh City	Naval Technical College	Trường Cao đẳng Kỹ thuật Hải quân

=== Police academies, universities ===
These Universities and Institutes also operate similarly to the military academies above. However, the governing body of police academies is the Ministry of Public Security instead of the Ministry of National Defense.

No.	Location	English name	Vietnamese name
29	Hanoi	Vietnam People's Security Academy (T01/C500)	Học viện An ninh nhân dân
30	Hanoi	Vietnam People's Police Academy (T02/T18/T32)	Học viện Cảnh sát nhân dân
31	Hanoi	Vietnam People's Public Security - Political Academy (T03/T29)	Học viện Chính trị - Công an nhân dân Việt Nam
32	Hanoi	International Academy (B06)	Học viện Quốc tế
33	Hanoi	Vietnam Police Fire Prevention and Fighting University (T06/K56)	Trường Đại học Cảnh sát Phòng cháy chữa cháy
34	Bắc Ninh	Vietnam People's Public Security – Technical - Logistics University (T07/T36)	Trường Đại học Kỹ thuật – Hậu cần - Công an Nhân dân Việt Nam
35	Ho Chi Minh City	Vietnam People's Security University (T04/T47)	Trường Đại học An ninh nhân dân
36	Ho Chi Minh City	Vietnam People's Police University (T05/T48)	Trường Đại học Cảnh sát nhân dân

== Public universities at local level ==
These are local universities, under the management of the government and the people's committees of the provinces. These universities are usually multidisciplinary but small in size.

No.	English name	Vietnamese name	Location
154	Hanoi Metropolitan University	Trường Đại học Thủ đô Hà Nội	Hanoi
155	Ho Chi Minh City Cadre Academy	Học viện Cán bộ Thành phố Hồ Chí Minh	Ho Chi Minh City
156	Saigon University	Trường Đại học Sài Gòn	Ho Chi Minh City
157	Pham Ngoc Thach University of Medicine	Trường Đại học Y khoa Phạm Ngọc Thạch	Ho Chi Minh City
158	Haiphong University	Trường Đại học Hải Phòng	Haiphong
159	Can Tho University of Technology	Trường Đại học Kỹ thuật – Công nghệ Cần Thơ	Cần Thơ
160	Bac Lieu University	Trường Đại học Bạc Liêu	Bạc Liêu
161	Thu Dau Mot University	Trường Đại học Thủ Dầu Một	Bình Dương
162	Dong Nai University	Trường Đại học Đồng Nai	Đồng Nai
163	Ha Tinh University	Trường Đại học Hà Tĩnh	Hà Tĩnh
164	Hai Duong University	Trường Đại học Hải Dương	Hải Dương
165	Khanh Hoa University	Trường Đại học Khánh Hoà	Khánh Hòa
166	Nghe An University of Economics	Trường Đại học Kinh tế Nghệ An	Nghệ An
167	Vinh Medical University	Trường Đại học Y khoa Vinh	Nghệ An
168	Hoa Lu University	Trường Đại học Hoa Lư	Ninh Bình
169	Hung Vuong University	Trường Đại học Hùng Vương	Phú Thọ
170	Phu Yen University	Trường Đại học Phú Yên	Phú Yên
171	Quang Binh University	Trường Đại học Quảng Bình	Quảng Bình
172	Quang Nam University	Trường Đại học Quảng Nam	Quảng Nam
173	Pham Van Dong University	Trường Đại học Phạm Văn Đồng	Quảng Ngãi
174	Ha Long University	Trường Đại học Hạ Long	Quảng Ninh
175	Thai Binh University	Trường Đại học Thái Bình	Thái Bình
176	Hong Duc University	Trường Đại học Hồng Đức	Thanh Hóa
177	University of Culture, Sports and Tourism in Thanh Hoa	Trường Đại học Văn hoá, Thể thao và Du lịch Thanh Hoá	Thanh Hóa
178	Tien Giang University	Trường Đại học Tiền Giang	Tiền Giang
179	Tra Vinh University	Trường Đại học Trà Vinh	Trà Vinh
180	Tan Trao University	Trường Đại học Tân Trào	Tuyên Quang

== Private universities ==
Private universities in Vietnam are set up by private companies/corporations and provide higher education services similar to public universities. The Vietnamese government allows corporations to set up private universities on the condition that they will be jointly managed by the Ministry of Education and Training and the Board of Directors of the corporation. The Ministry of Education and Training manages educational expertise, and issues related to building training programs, teaching and managing students,... while the Board of Directors manages issues about financial expenditure, investment attraction, and operational structure of the university.

No.	English name	Vietnamese name	Abbreviation
181	CMC University	Trường Đại học CMC	CMCU
182	University of Technology and Management	Trường Đại học Công nghệ và Quản lý Hữu nghị	UTM
183	Dai Nam University	Trường Đại học Đại Nam	DNU
184	Dong Do University	Trường Đại học Đông Đô	DDU
185	FPT University	Trường Đại học FPT	FPTU
185	Hoa Binh University	Trường Đại học Hoà Bình	HBU
186	Hanoi University of Business and Technology	Trường Đại học Kinh doanh và Công nghệ Hà Nội	HUBT
187	Nguyen Trai University	Trường Đại học Nguyễn Trãi	NTU
188	Phenikaa University	Trường Đại học Phenikaa	PNKU
189	Finance and Banking University	Trường Đại học Tài chính Ngân hàng	FBU
190	Thanh Do University	Trường Đại học Thành Đô	TDU
191	Thang Long University	Trường Đại học Thăng Long	TLU
192	VinUniversity	Trường Đại học VinUni	VinUni
193	Ho Chi Minh City University of Technology	Trường Đại học Công nghệ Thành phố Hồ Chí Minh	HUTECH
149	Gia Dinh University	Trường Đại học Gia Định	GDU
195	Hoa Sen University	Trường Đại học Hoa Sen	HSU
196	Hong Bang International University	Trường Đại học Quốc tế Hồng Bàng	HIU
197	Hung Vuong University Ho Chi Minh City	Trường Đại học Hùng Vương Thành phố Hồ Chí Minh	HVUH
198	University of Economics and Finance	Trường Đại học Kinh tế – Tài chính Thành phố Hồ Chí Minh	HEF
199	Ho Chi Minh City University of Foreign Language and Information Technology	Trường Đại học Ngoại ngữ – Tin học Thành phố Hồ Chí Minh	HUFLIT
200	Nguyen Tat Thanh University	Trường Đại học Nguyễn Tất Thành	NTTU
201	Van Lang University	Trường Đại học Văn Lang	VLU
202	Van Hien University	Trường Đại học Văn Hiến	VHU
203	Saigon International University	Trường Đại học Quốc tế Sài Gòn	SIU
204	Saigon Technology University	Trường Đại học Công nghệ Sài Gòn	STU
205	Ba Ria – Vung Tau University	Trường Đại học Bà Rịa – Vũng Tàu	BR-VTU
206	Dong A Technology University	Trường Đại học Công nghệ Đông Á	DATU
207	University of Kinh Bac	Trường Đại học Kinh Bắc	UKB
208	Bac Ha International University	Trường Đại học Quốc tế Bắc Hà	BIU
209	Binh Duong University	Trường Đại học Bình Dương	BDU
210	Binh Duong Economics and Technology University	Trường Đại học Kinh tế – Kỹ thuật Bình Dương	BETU
211	Eastern International University	Trường Đại học Quốc tế Miền Đông	EIU
212	Quang Trung University	Trường Đại học Quang Trung	QTU
213	Phan Thiet University	Trường Đại học Phan Thiết	PTU
214	Nam Can Tho University	Trường Đại học Nam Cần Thơ	NCTU
215	Tay Do University	Trường Đại học Tây Đô	TDU
216	Dong A University	Trường Đại học Đông Á	DAU
217	Da Nang Architecture University	Trường Đại học Kiến trúc Đà Nẵng	DAU
218	Buon Ma Thuot Medical University	Trường Đại học Y khoa Buôn Ma Thuột	BMTU
219	Dong Nai Technology University	Trường Đại học Công nghệ Đồng Nai	DTU
220	Mien Dong Institute of Technology	Trường Đại học Công nghệ Miền Đông	MITU
221	Lac Hong University	Trường Đại học Lạc Hồng	LHU
222	Thanh Dong University	Trường Đại học Thành Đông	TDU
223	Vo Truong Toan University	Trường Đại học Võ Trường Toản	VTTU
224	Chu Van An University	Trường Đại học Chu Văn An	CVAU
225	Thai Binh Duong University	Trường Đại học Thái Bình Dương	TBDU
226	Yersin University	Trường Đại học Yersin Đà Lạt	YU
227	Long An University of Economics and Industry	Trường Đại học Kinh tế Công nghiệp Long An	EILAU
228	Tan Tao University	Trường Đại học Tân Tạo	TTU
229	Luong The Vinh University	Trường Đại học Lương Thế Vinh	LTVU
230	Van Xuan University of Technology	Trường Đại học Công nghệ Vạn Xuân	VXUT
231	Industrial University of Vinh	Trường Đại học Công nghiệp Vinh	IUV
232	Phan Chau Trinh University	Trường Đại học Phan Châu Trinh	PCTU
233	TUETECH University	Trường Đại học Kinh tế – Công nghệ Thái Nguyên	TUETECH
234	Phu Xuan University	Trường Đại học Phú Xuân	PXU
235	Cuu Long University	Trường Đại học Cửu Long	CLU
236	Pacific Vietnam University	Trường Đại học Thái Bình Dương	PVNU
237	Trung Vuong University	Trường Đại học Trưng Vương	TVU

== Foreign-invested Universities ==
This list includes universities in Vietnam but established and managed by international organizations or foreign governments. Unlike universities established under the cooperation between the Vietnamese government and foreign governments (e.g. VGU, VJU, VKU, etc.), the universities in this list are under the independent management of a foreign organization/government. The Vietnamese government does not interfere in the operation of the school, however, it has the right to ask the directors to explain their management activities to ensure compliance with the provisions of Vietnamese law. Normally, these universities have the right to enroll students by separate methods, independent of the general regulations of the Vietnamese Ministry of Education.

No.	Name	Abbreviation	Campus	Type of operation
1	The Royal Melbourne Institute of Technology University in Vietnam	RMU	Ho Chi Minh City and Hanoi City	Overseas campus of Royal Melbourne Institute of Technology, Australian in Vietnam.
2	British University Vietnam	BUV	Hưng Yên	Delivering and awarding degrees from the University of London, the University of Staffordshire, the University of Stirling, Arts University Bournemouth, Bournemouth University, and Manchester Metropolitan University.
3	Tokyo Human Health Sciences University Vietnam	THU	Hưng Yên	
4	The American University of Vietnam	AUV	Da Nang City	Offering American-style college education and credit-transfer programs.
5	Fulbright University Vietnam	FUV	Ho Chi Minh City	Vietnam's first private, nonprofit institutions of higher education. Delivering national undergraduate and postgraduate degrees.
