= Cyrtodactylus chungi =

Scientific classification
- Kingdom: Animalia
- Phylum: Chordata
- Class: Reptilia
- Order: Squamata
- Suborder: Gekkota
- Family: Gekkonidae
- Genus: Cyrtodactylus
- Species: C. chungi

Binomial name
- Cyrtodactylus chungi Ostrowski, Le, Ngo, Pham, Phung, Nguyen & Ziegler, 2021

Species of reptile

Cyrtodactylus chungi is a species of gecko known only from two specimens found in the Ta Kou Nature Reserve in Binh Thuan province, Vietnam. It is also known as Chung's bent-toed gecko. C. chungi is part of the Cyrtodactylus irregularis species-group and is sister species to Cyrtodactylus cattienensis.

Both C. chungi's scientific and common names are named for Dr. Ngo Dac Chung, a herpetologist at Hue University.
