= Hanoi Vocational Education and Training Company =

Hanoi Vocational Education and Training Company (HAVETCO) is an international & educational institution specialized in language, education and career services. The company, licensed under the Vietnamese Ministry of Education, has its main office in Hanoi, Vietnam and is a member of Vietnamese Vocational Training Association (VVTA).

== History ==
HAVETCO was established in Hanoi in 1995, as an education consultancy company specialized in sending students abroad. In 2003, a Language Training Centre was set up offering a variety of English, French, Chinese, Japanese and Russian language courses.

== Philosophy ==
HAVETCO aims to provide Vietnamese students outstanding language skills and access to top international academic institutions.

== See also ==
- Education in Vietnam
- List of universities in Vietnam
- Vocational schools of the Ministry of Industry
- Hanoi
- Vietnam
