= University of Economics Ho Chi Minh City =

University in Vietnam

- Đại học Kinh tế Thành phố Hồ Chí Minh
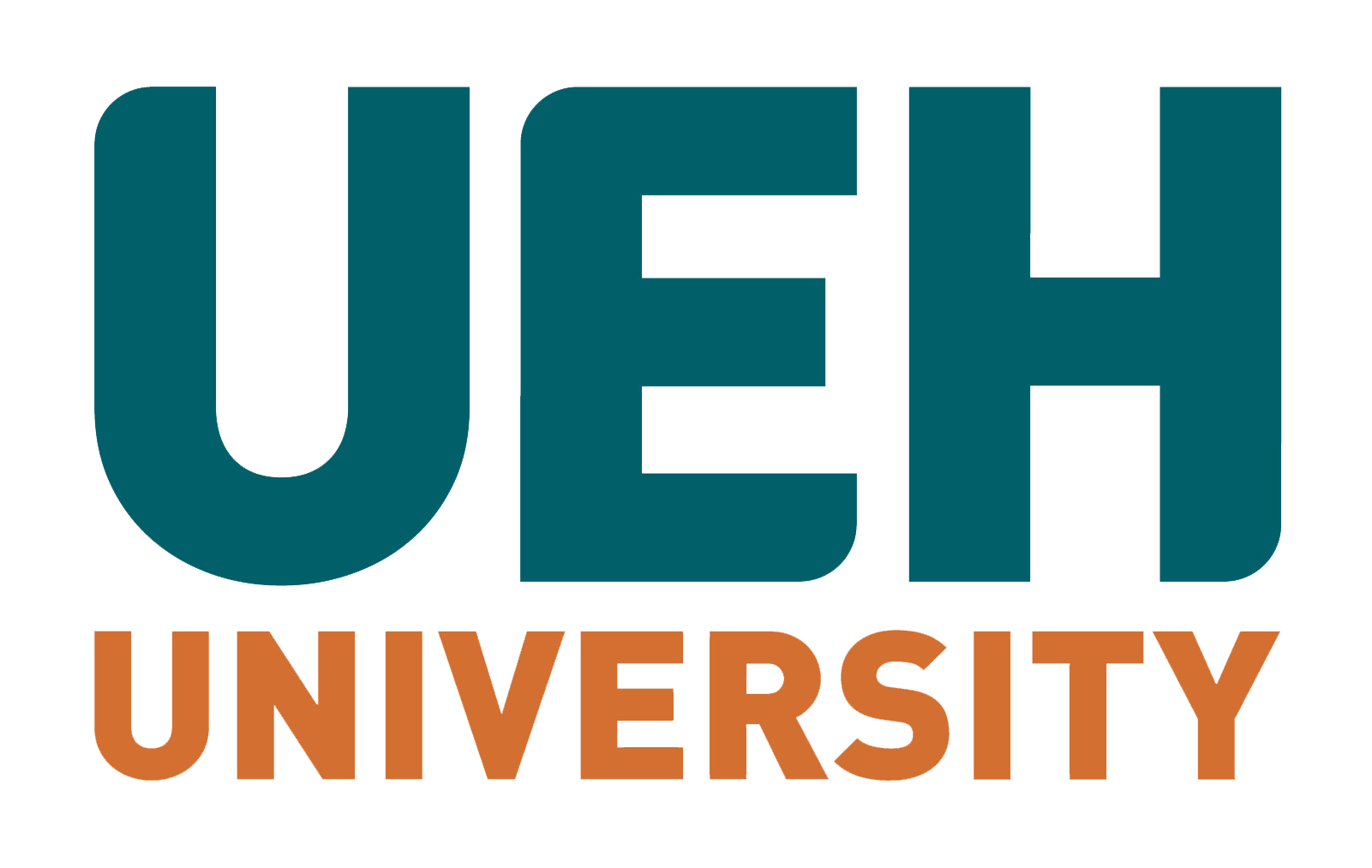
- Other name: UEH University
- Motto: Unbounded creativity - Empowered futures - Holistic values
- Type: Public National Key Universities of Vietnam
- Established: October 27, 1976
- President: Su Dinh Thanh
- Faculty: 767 full-time
- Students: 30,747
- Undergraduates: 20,000
- Postgraduates: 10,000
- Location: 59C Nguyễn Đình Chiểu Street & 17 Phạm Ngọc Thạch Street, Xuân Hòa, Ho Chi Minh City, Vietnam; 10.7840°N 106.6942°E
- Campus: Urban
- Website: ueh.edu.vn

The University of Economics Ho Chi Minh City (UEH; Vietnamese: Đại học Kinh tế Thành phố Hồ Chí Minh), known redundantly as the UEH University, is a multidisciplinary university which was established in 1976 in Ho Chi Minh City, Vietnam. It is one of the National Key Universities of Vietnam and is a member of The Best 1,000 Business Schools in the World. From its inception until now, the school has been a renowned center of scientific research in Vietnam, providing undergraduate and postgraduate education for students from the country and neighboring Laos and Cambodia. CYM Group, a student academic club of the University of Economics Ho Chi Minh City is the first student group in Vietnam to set a Guinness World Record.

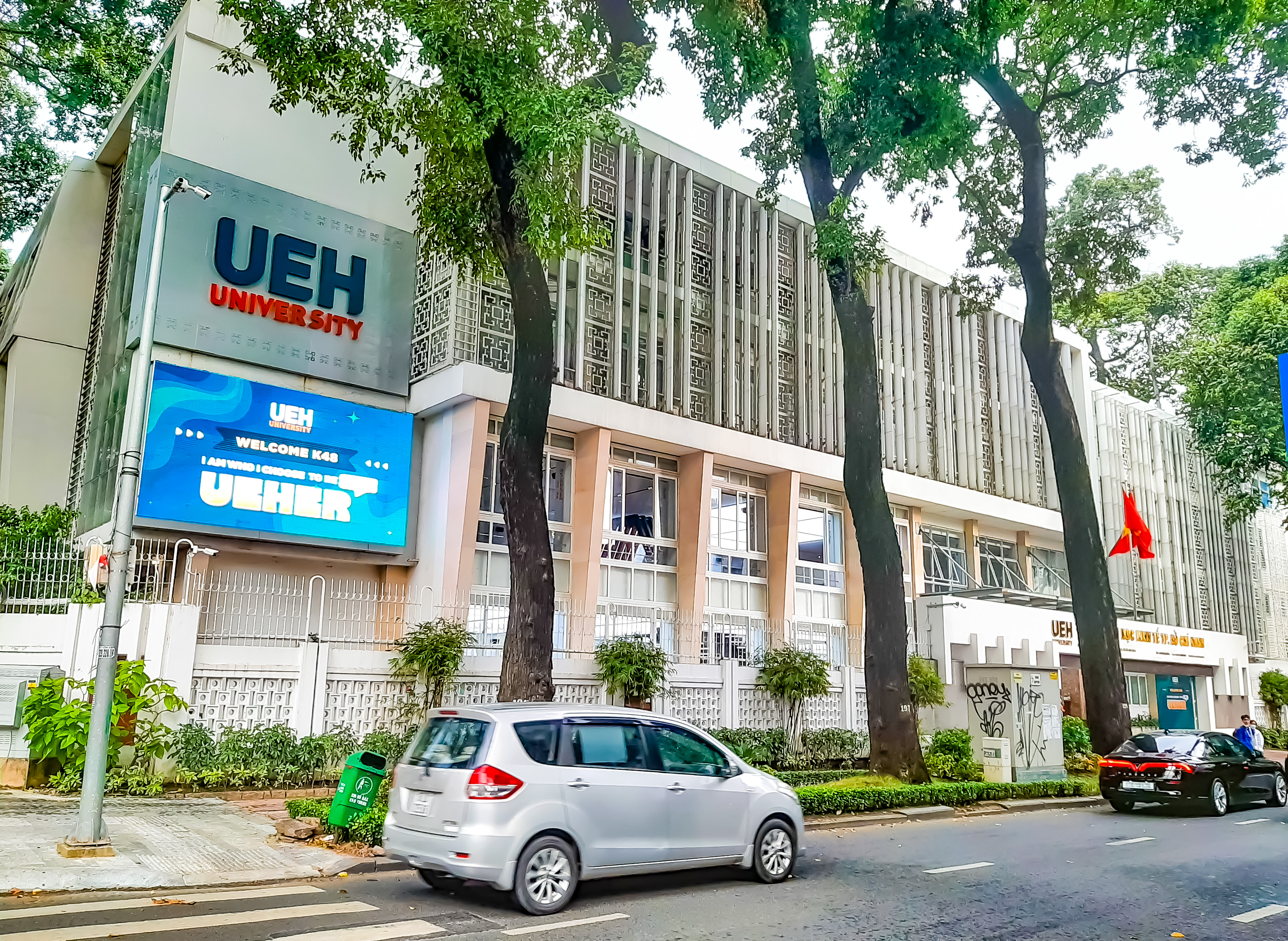
Headquarter (Campus A) main entrance in District 3

The university now provides graduate and postgraduate education (master's, doctoral programs) to over 50,000 students/year. University of Economics Ho Chi Minh City celebrated its 45th anniversary on October 27, 2021, with the theme “UEH Toward Future University”.

== History ==
In 1996, the Prime Minister of Vietnam issued Decision No 2819/GD-ĐT to merge Hochiminh City University of Economics, the University of Finance–Accounting and Ho Chi Minh City University's Faculty of Economics into the University of Economics as a member of Vietnam National University, Ho Chi Minh City (VNU-HCM).

In 2000, the Prime Minister signed the structural transform decision to detach the University of Economics from VNU-HCM into the University of Economics Ho Chi Minh City (UEH) under the administration of the Ministry of Education and Training, Vietnam (MoET).

On the 4th of October 2023, the Prime Minister Trần Hồng Hà signed Decision 1146/QĐ-TTg, initiating the transformation of the University of Economics Ho Chi Minh City (UEH) into a University. This decision places UEH among 7 higher education institutions in Vietnam that operate in accordance with the model of a “multi-disciplinary and multi-major university” in alignment with the global system of advanced universities. This represents a significant developmental step, built upon nearly five decades of accumulated endogenous capacity. It aligns with the practical requirements in Vietnam and the development trend in university development. This foundation relies on the appropriate utilization of internal resources, and the simultaneous establishment of cooperative relationships with domestic and international partners. The ultimate goal is to fulfill the mission, vision and orientation that have been consistently and specifically shaped at each stage of UEH’s journey.

== Staff ==
As in 2021, the school has nearly 800 lecturers, the students/teachers rate on a reach 22:1; Include 25 Professors, 53 Associate Professors, 07 People's Teachers, 35 Excellent Teachers, 255 Ph.D., 371 Masters, and 179 international experts.

== Students and alumni ==
=== Current students ===
UEH University is training nearly 52,000 students and trainees under the system grades: regular college or university degree two formal, non-formal college or university degree two non-formal and complete knowledge college, high school, graduate students, which is the largest university system of government.

=== Alumni ===
Graduates of the university since its establishment include:

- 200,000 Bachelors
- 5,355 Masters
- 439 Doctorates

== Achievements and awards ==
=== Achievements ===
- Eduniversal: Top 1,000 Best Business Schools and Top 100 Best MBA program in the world
- QS World University Rankings: Top 551+ Best Universities in Asia
- SCImago Institutions Rankings: #376 Best Universities in Asia in Research Performance, Innovation, and Societal Impact
- U-Multirank: Top 25 Performing Universities in income from continuous professional development (since 2016)
- Webometrics Ranking of World Universities: Top 11 Best Universities in Vietnam

=== Awards ===
President of Vietnam awarded for UEH:Hero of LaborOrder of IndependenceLabor Order

- Hero of Labor (Vietnam) title in 2006
- Independence Order in 2021
- 3 Labor Order in 1986, 1991 and 1996
- 3 Labor Order for UEH's labor union in 1996, 2001 and 2006
- 2 Labor Order for UEH's Ho Chi Minh Communist Youth Union in 1997 and 2002
- Labor Order for UEH's Students Union in 2006
- Labor Order for UEH's achievement gratitude and charitable social work in 2000.

== Campuses and branches ==
=== In Ho Chi Minh City ===
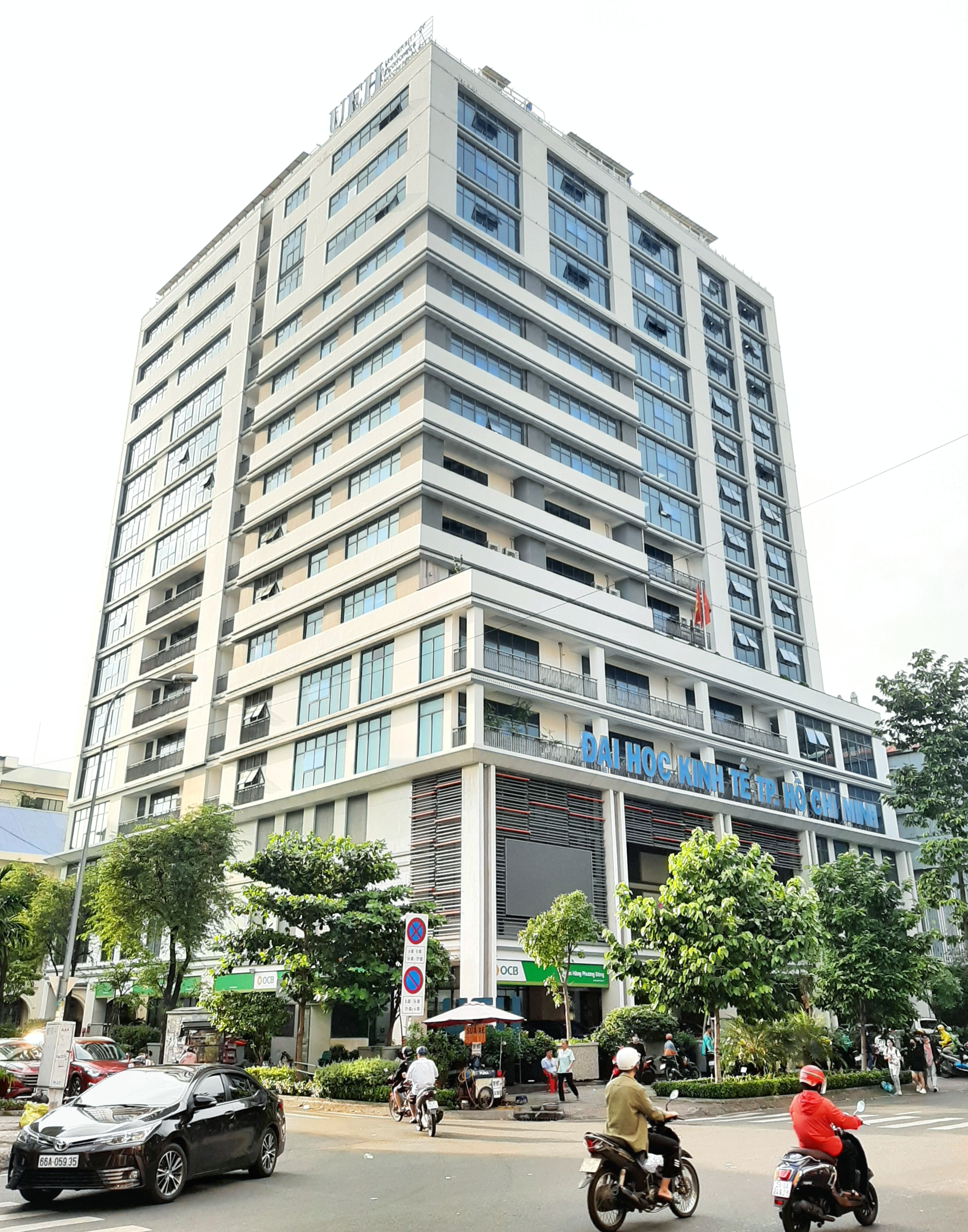
Campus B on Nguyễn Tri Phương Blvd, Diên Hồng, Ho Chi Minh City

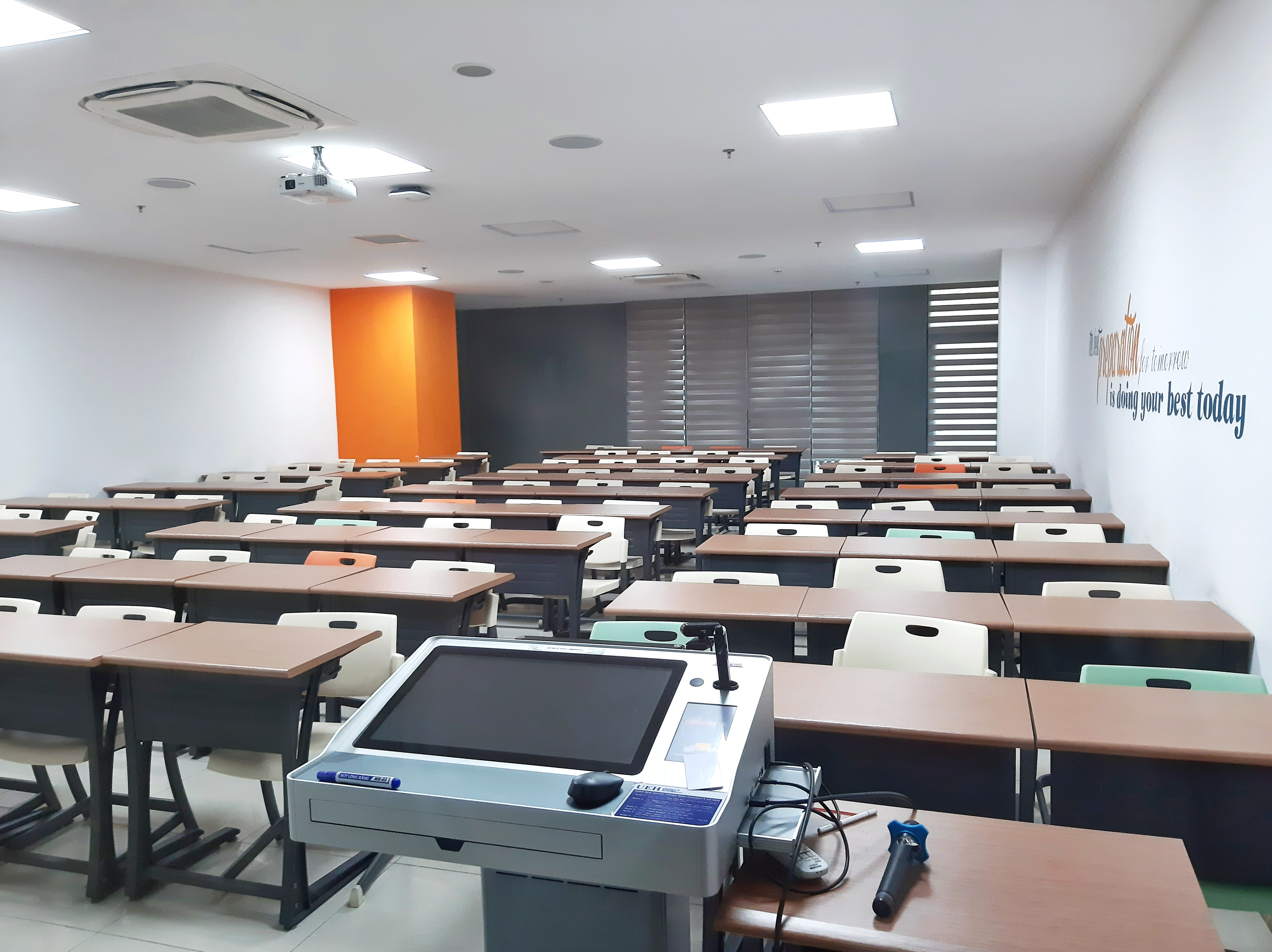
Lecture room at Campus B1

UEH operates with 10 campuses in Ho Chi Minh City, most of them are urban campuses:

- Campus A (headquarter): 59C Nguyễn Đình Chiểu St., Xuân Hòa
- Campus B (comprises B1 and B2 Tower): 279 Nguyễn Tri Phương Blvd., Diên Hồng
- Campus C: Headquarters of Centre Franco-Vietnamien de Formation à la Gestion (CFVG), 91 February 3rd Blvd., Vườn Lài
- Campus D: 196 Trần Quang Khải St., Tân Định
- Campus E: 54 Nguyễn Văn Thủ St., Tân Định
- Campus H: 1A Hoàng Diệu St., Phú Nhuận
- Campus I: 17 Phạm Ngọc Thạch St., Xuân Hòa (next to headquarter)
- Campus N: Nguyễn Văn Linh Parkway, Fuctional Area No. 15, South Saigon New Town, Bình Hưng
- Campus V: UII - UEH Institute of Innovation, Institute of Smart Cities and Management (ISCM) and UEH Boutique Hotel: No. 232/6 Võ Thị Sáu St., Xuân Hòa
- UEH Sports Center: 144 Phạm Đức Sơn St., Phú Định

The UEH Boutique Hotel at Campus V was established in 2020, following the conversion of the university’s former guesthouse. It meets standards equivalent to a 3-star hotel and serves an academic purpose: providing students in tourism and hospitality programs with a venue to apply their professional knowledge. Spanning an area of 500 m², the hotel comprises a ground floor and three upper levels, housing 35 guest rooms. It is fully equipped and qualified to provide front-office, reception, and accommodation services for domestic and international experts, scientists, and scholars visiting the university for work or research purposes.

To facilitate travel between campuses, in February 2022, the university officially launched an express bus service called "UEH Shuttle Bus" designed for staff, faculty, and students. The service connects campuses A, B, and N with the university’s dormitories, operating 10 trips daily; tickets can be booked in advance via a mobile application. This makes it the first university in Ho Chi Minh City to offer such a service.

=== Branches ===
Since the end of 2019, UEH has incorporated the Vĩnh Long College of Economics and Finance and has managed the UEH branch in Vĩnh Long, located at 1B Nguyễn Trung Trực, Tân Hạnh (former Vĩnh Long City), Vĩnh Long province.

The university is also preparing to launch the UEH branch project in South Nha Trang, Khánh Hòa province. The campus is named UEH Nexus Campus Nha Trang.

=== Library ===
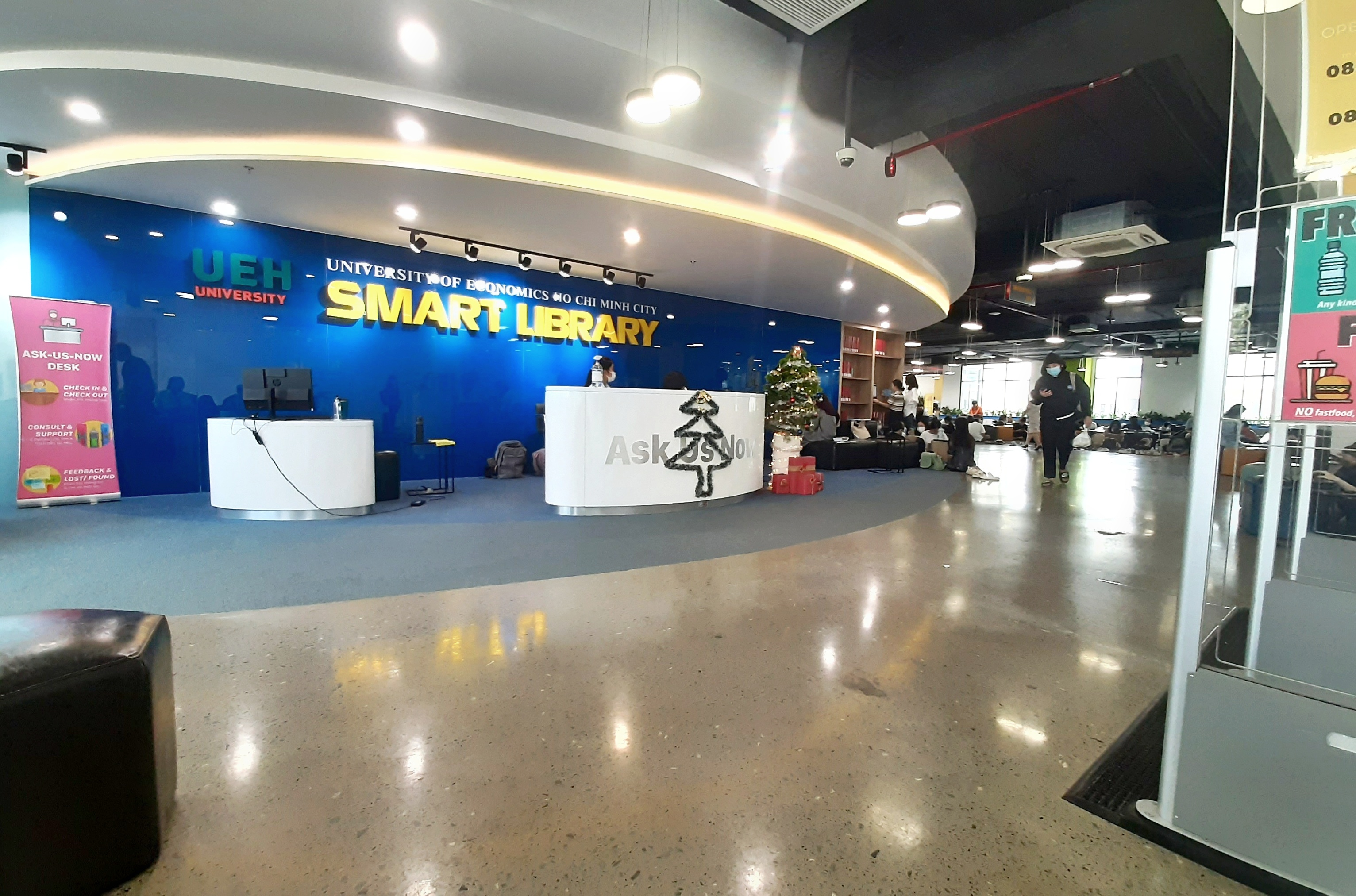
Smart Library at Campus B

The university currently operates two libraries, located at Campuses B and N, offering a combined reading capacity of over 1,000 seats. The UEH Smart Library at Campus B comprises 15 reading rooms spanning a total area of 1,315 m². The library’s collection currently holds 398,000 volumes covering various fields of economics, including 600 titles sourced from Harvard. Furthermore, the library provides access to databases from over 90 university publishers, such as: University of Oxford, University of Cambridge, Harvard University, etc. This is a digital library, featuring modern infrastructure and automation across all its operations. Users can search for books, borrow items, and reserve rooms—all using a smartphone with an internet connection.

The interior of the library is designed in a modern style and equipped with various cameras, electronic sensors, and other devices that collect data on factors such as fine particulate matter, temperature, humidity, noise levels, and light intensity. By leveraging IoT technology, the system gathers information, including the number of people present in the library and air quality, to make appropriate adjustments.

The university also has a dedicated library building planned for the Campus N grounds, which is currently in the preparatory stages of construction.

=== Dorms ===
The university has two dormitories located in the center of Ho Chi Minh City, covering a total area of 6,376 m² and comprising 227 rooms with a capacity of approximately 1,600 students (3.8 m² per student):

- 135 Trần Hưng Đạo Boulevard, Cầu Ông Lãnh, has a total capacity of 765 students, area per room is around 25–30 m².
- 43-45 Nguyễn Chí Thanh Street, An Đông, has a total capacity of 804 students, area per room is 30 m².

The UEH branch in Vĩnh Long manages one dormitory located at 1B Nguyễn Trung Trực, Tân Hạnh, has a total capacity of 414 students.

== Schools and institutes ==
=== College of Business ===
- Faculty of Finance
- Faculty of Accounting
- Faculty of Management
- Faculty of International Business and Marketing
- Faculty of Banking
- Faculty of Tourism
- Institute of Human Resources Development

=== College of Economics, Law, and Government ===
- Faculty of Economics
- Faculty of Government
- Faculty of Law
- Faculty of Public Finance
- Faculty of Foreign Languages of Economics
- Institute of Public Policy
- Institute of Economic Development Research

=== College of Technology and Design ===
- Faculty of Economic Mathematics and Statistics
- Faculty of Business Information Technology
- Institute of Smart City and Management
- Institute of Applied Mathematics
- Institute of Intelligent & Interactive Technology

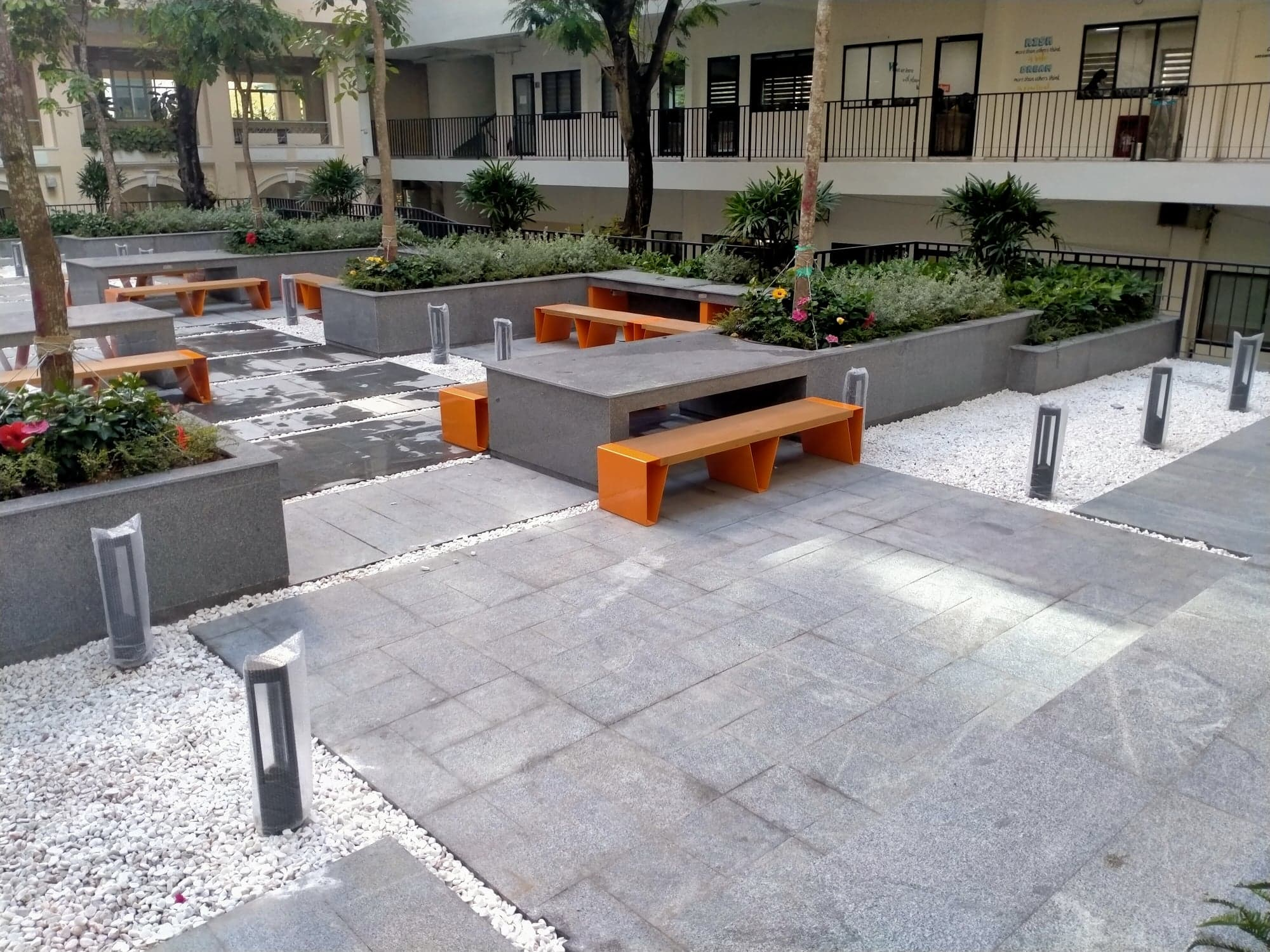
Small park inside the campus B

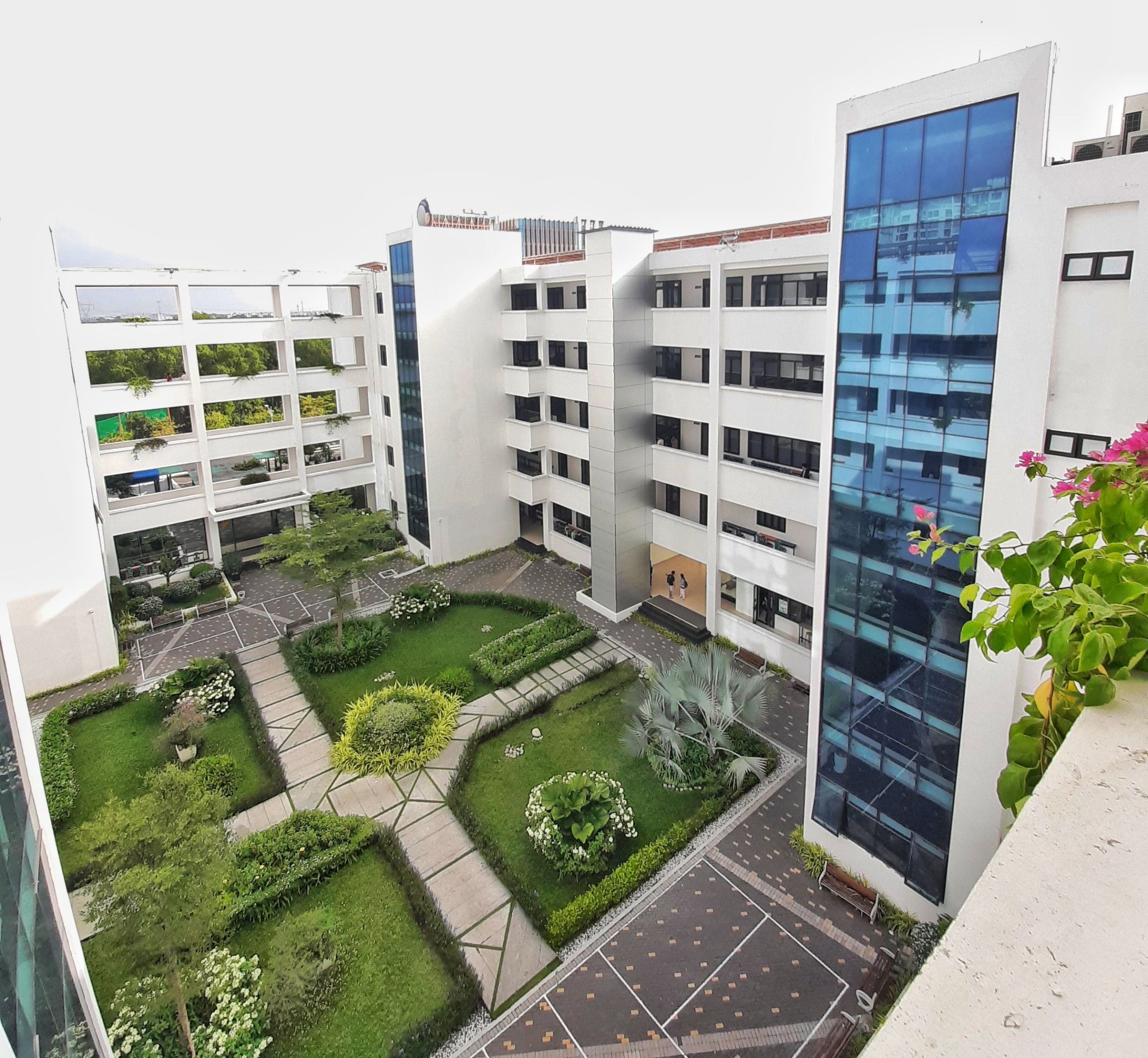
Campus N2, Zone B – Saigon South Urban Development, Bình Hưng, Bình Chánh district

=== UEH Vĩnh Long Campus ===
- Faculty of Accounting
- Faculty of Finance and Banking
- Faculty of Management
- Faculty of Information Technology
- Mekong Center of International Education

=== Other faculties and institutes ===
- Institute of Socio - Political Studies
- International Language and Country Studies Institute
- Center for Excellence in Management Development
- Journal of Economic Development
- International School of Business
- Health and Agricultural Policy Research Institute (HAPRI)

== International cooperation ==
Students will study half-time at UEH University and half-time abroad, and receive a degree from a foreign partner.

- CFVG - France Vietnamese Centre For Management Education: MBA, Master's degree in Economics, Banking - Finance, and Marketing
- Vietnam – The Netherlands Program with Erasmus University Rotterdam; Master's degrees and Joint Doctorate Programme (JDP)
- Vietnam – The New Zealand Program (Victoria University of Wellington): Bachelor's degree in Commerce and Administration
- UEH University - Western Sydney University Program: Master's degree in Business Administration and Commerce, Doctoral program in Economics

== See also ==
- Fulbright economics teaching program (University of Economics)
- List of universities in Vietnam
- List of colleges in Ho Chi Minh City
