= Natalia Kholod =

Natalia Kholod is a Ukrainian strategist, expert in anti-crisis communications, founder and executive director of WARTO Communications Agency. She works with UNIDO to rebuild the Ukrainian city destroyed or affected by the Russian invasion.

== Education ==
From 1996 to 2001, Natalia Kholod studied at the Ukrainian State University of Food Technologies, specializing in the automation of production and enterprises. In 2001-2003, she received a master's degree in economics and personnel management at the Interregional Academy of Personnel Management. From 2003 to 2006, she studied at the National Academy of Public Administration under the President of Ukraine and received a master's degree in Public Administration in the field of information policy and information technology.

== Career ==
Natalia started her career in 2002 in political election campaigns. Also, until 2006, Natalia Kholod advised the Cherkasy Regional State Administration and the head of the region on public communications.

In May 2005, Natalia Kholod founded the WARTO communications agency, which is still in operation today. In 2012, Natalia launched the Academy of Healthy Hearts, a volunteer educational movement.

In July 2019, Natalia's agency developed a communication strategy for the Dobrobut Medical Center, which aimed to change the public's negative perception of cancer. This project won the international Effie Awards in two nominations.

She was the head of Ukraine's State Healthcare Agency in 2019-2021. In 2020, Natalia's WARTO Agency, together with USAID and the Mariupol City Council, created a communication strategy for The Strategy 2030 project, which became a finalist at the Effie Europe Awards 2022 in December 2022.

In 2021, Natalia Kholod began cooperation with UNIDO, which continues to this day. At the end of February 2022, Natalia Kholod, launched the CSR program "First Communication Assistance to Business", which helps businesses during Russia's war against Ukraine. In 2023, the WARTO team became an ambassador of Ukraine at the annual conference of the Association of Independent Agencies AMIN EMEA in Valencia and at the PRCA International Summit 2023 in London.
