= Vietnam National University =

Vietnam National University may refer to:

- Vietnam National University, Hanoi
- Vietnam National University, Ho Chi Minh City
- List of national key universities of Vietnam
