= National Key Universities of Vietnam =

List of Universities in Vietnam

National key academies, universities (Vietnamese: Đại học, Học viện trọng điểm quốc gia) are Vietnam's national (so-called leading regional and national) universities, colleges, research-oriented institutes and academies which are given priority by the government to autonomy such as: be self-printed and doctoral degrees; have full authority to send officials to study abroad, except for cases of studying with the state budget; be actively invited and receive lecturers and foreign students to study and teach; It is suggested to open training disciplines not included in the training list. In addition, the Principal will decide the budget for equipment investment and capital construction without having to go through the Ministry of Education and Training of Vietnam.

Currently, in Vietnam, there are 20 higher education institutions selected to be built into national key universities including 2 national university systems, 3 regional university systems and 14 specialized universities and academies according to fields and key national branches.

According to the government's plan, national key research universities will be built with advanced training and research qualifications to be the driving force for the development of Vietnam's university network. More than 75% of teaching staff will have a doctorate level.

== List of national key academies, universities ==
National Key Universities of Vietnam
| No. | Type | University system | Location | Description |
|---|---|---|---|---|
| 1 | National university | Vietnam National University, Hanoi | Hanoi | One of the earliest and largest multidisciplinary institutions in Northern Vietnam, specializing in training, pure scientific research, and its applications. |
| 2 | National university | Vietnam National University, Ho Chi Minh City | Ho Chi Minh City | One of the earliest and largest multidisciplinary institutions in Southern Vietnam, specializing in training, pure scientific research, and its applications. |
| 3 | Regional university | Hue University | Huế | The largest university system in the North Central Coast. |
| 4 | Regional university | Da Nang University | Da Nang | The largest university system in Central Vietnam. |
| 5 | Regional university | Thái Nguyên University | Thái Nguyên, Thái Nguyên province | The largest university system in northern midlands and mountainous. |
| 6 | Regional university | Vinh University | Vinh, Nghệ An province | The second largest university in the North Central Coast. |
| 7 | Regional university | Nha Trang University | Khánh Hòa province | One of the three leading multidisciplinary universities in Central Vietnam in terms of training. |
| 8 | Regional university | Tay Nguyen University | Đắk Lắk province | The largest university in the Central Highlands . |
| 9 | Regional university | Can Tho University | Cần Thơ | The largest university in the Mekong Delta. |
| 10 | Specialized university system | Hanoi National University of Education | Hanoi | The leading university in the field of education in Northern Vietnam. |
| 11 | Specialized university system | Ho Chi Minh City University of Education | Ho Chi Minh City | The leading university in the field of education in Southern Vietnam. |
| 12 | Specialized university system | Hanoi University of Science and Technology | Hanoi | The leading university in engineering and technology in Northern Vietnam. |
| 13 | Specialized university system | Hanoi University of Civil Engineering | Hanoi | The leading university in the fields of engineering and construction in Northern Vietnam. |
| 14 | Specialized university system | Vietnam Maritime University | Haiphong | The leading university in the field of transport and logistics schools of Vietnam |
| 15 | Specialized university system | Ho Chi Minh City University of Technology and Engineering | Ho Chi Minh City | The leading university in engineering and technology in Southern Vietnam. |
| 16 | Specialized university system | University of Transport and Communications | Hanoi | The leading university in engineering and transportation in Northern Vietnam. |
| 17 | Specialized university system | Posts and Telecommunications Institute of Technology | Hanoi | The leading university in technology in Northern Vietnam. |
| 18 | Specialized university system | Hanoi Medical University | Hanoi | The leading university in the field of medical schools in Northern Vietnam. |
| 19 | Specialized university system | Hanoi Law University | Hanoi | The leading university in Law in Northern Vietnam. |
| 20 | Specialized university system | Ho Chi Minh City University of Law | Ho Chi Minh City | The leading university in Law in Southern Vietnam. |
