= Vietnam Maritime University =

University in Haiphong, Vietnam

Coordinates: 20.837335°N 106.695632°E

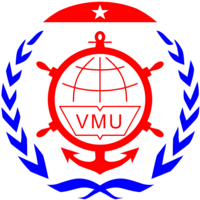
- Established: April 1, 1956
- Principal: Dr. Phạm Xuân Dương
- Location: 484 Lạch Tray, Phường Lê Chân, Haiphong
- Campus: Urban
- Website: eng.vimaru.edu.vn

Vietnam Maritime University (VMU; Vietnamese: Trường Đại học Hàng hải Việt Nam) is a university in Haiphong operated by the Ministry of Transport. The university was established on 1 April 1956 as Haiphong Maritime University. As of 2025, this is the only maritime university in Vietnam. The university has over 1000 staffs, of which, 450 are faculty staffs. The university provides undergraduate and graduate education of shipbuilding, maritime navigation, nautical technology. It has a second campus in Vung Tau city.

== History ==
As established on April 1, 1956 at scale of vocational school.

Nowadays, the university is educating 31 undergraduate majors, 11 majors at master level, 8 majors at doctorate level with the total number of 25.959 full-time students; 983 lecturers and administrative staffs. In which, there are 27 professors, 91 D.Sc & Ph.D. and 494 M.Sc., 338 captains and chief engineers and hundreds of qualified maritime officers and seafarers.

Prof.Dr. Phạm Xuân Dương - Acting president of VMU

== Faculties ==
1. Faculty of Maritime Navigation (Khoa Hàng Hải)
2. Faculty of Ship Machinery (Khoa Máy tàu biển)
3. Faculty of Electricity and Electronic Engineering (Khoa Điện - Điện tử)
4. Faculty of Shipbuilding (Khoa Đóng tàu)
5. Faculty of Mechanical Engineering (Viện cơ khí)
6. Faculty of Economics (Khoa Kinh tế)
7. Faculty of Structural Engineering (Khoa Công trình)
8. Faculty of IT (Khoa Công nghệ thông tin)
9. Faculty of Foreign Studies (Khoa Ngoại ngữ)
10. Faculty of International School of Education (Viện đào tạo quốc tế - ISE)
11. Faculty of Environment Engineering (Viện Môi trường)
12. Faculty of Finance Management (Khoa Quản trị - Tài chính)
13. Faculty of Postgraduate (Viện đào tạo sau đại học)
14. VMU Maritime Vocational College (Trường Cao đẳng nghề VMU)

=== International School of Education ===
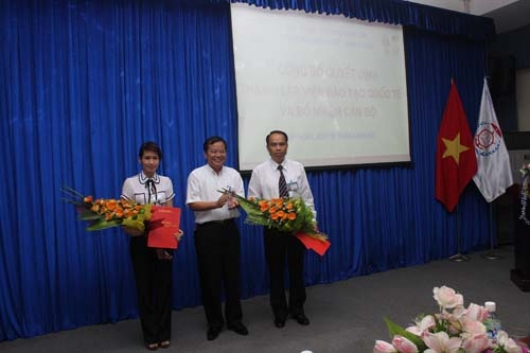
Dr. Le Quoc Tien - Head of General Administration Dept was appointed as Dean of International School of Education, Dr. Nguyen Thanh Thuy - Deputy Chair of Department of Maritime Economics, Director of Logistics Education and Training Centre, was appointed as Vice Dean of International School of Education .

Introduction: International Training Institute under the Maritime University, the English name is: International School of Education, referred to as the ISE function: Organize and manage projects with joint training foreign; imports of advanced programs; support students to study abroad and international student exchanges; supply human resources and implement collaborative scientific research. International Training Institute includes two majors: the maritime economy and globalization, international business and logistics. International Training Institute has the following tasks:

1. Organization and implementation of joint training program universities, graduate school or institute (as authorized by the School) signed with universities or educational institutions abroad.
2. Management of advanced training programs at the University.
3. Equipped with foreign language skills and prepare human resources to meet the requirements of the training program of international cooperation.
4. Links to organizations, institutions and foreign implementation of short-term training programs and certification of knowledge, expertise and professional in the field of science and technology, education, and business management.
5. Organize or co-organized conferences, seminars domestically and internationally about the contents of the field activities of the Institute.
6. Join, advice, propose solutions for the problems caused by the need for economic development, social set out in the fields of a activities of the Institute.
7. studying counseling services for organizations and individuals in need.
8. Perform other duties as assigned by the Principal.

Speaking at the decision announced Dr. Liang Gong Me - Party Secretary, Rector assigned for International Training Institute have developed policies, and quickly drafting rules work to the approval of the Principal, search personnel could meet the mission requirements of the institute and parallel to it, the service continues to perform well. Principal desirable in future international training institute will develop better meet the trust of leadership, staff, teachers and school employees.

- ISE
- After nearly two years of operation, the Institute of International Education has been gradually collaborative effort with universities in the world in which international training institute is developing joint training program with the following partners:

==== University of Applied Sciences (IMC) - Krems, Austria ====
University of Applied Sciences and IMC, Krems is the private schools in the system of Higher Education and Postgraduate top of the Republic of Austria, the system links more than 100 universities and training in 9 languages with special programs at the university and postgraduate. Where there are more than 2,000 students in Austria and thousands of students from other countries are studying and looking for career development opportunities to participate in an intensive training program with international standards of IMC-Krems . Training Program Master of Management degree by the University of Science and Application IMC, Krems by the Institute of International Education - Vietnam Maritime University undertook implementation will soon be deployed in the near future .

In addition, the Institute of International Education study advice, offer scholarships University, Graduate School, organized the exchange program students and Students majoring in "Maritime Economics and Globalization" is equipped with the following knowledge:

- Vietnam Maritime University.
- Khảo sát đồng phục sinh viên viện đào tạo quốc tế.

== Achievements ==
- Notable Achievements of Vietnam Maritime University over 63 years

- Third-Class Resistance Order
- Third-Class Military Exploit Order
- Third-Class Independence Order
- Second-Class Independence Order
- First-Class Independence Order
- Third-Class Labor Order
- Second-Class Labor Order
- First-Class Labor Order
- Title of "Labor Hero" during the Renovation Era
- Ho Chi Minh Order
- Title of "Hero of the People's Armed Forces"

- In 2005:

- Government Emulation Flag, Decision No. 138/QD-TTg, February 25, 2006, by the Prime Minister.
- Certificate of Merit from the Minister of Transport, No. 138/QD-BGTVT, December 1, 2004.
- Three groups and five individuals awarded Certificates of Merit from the Minister of Transport, No. 3623/QD-BGTVT, November 26, 2004.
- Thirty individuals awarded the title of Outstanding Transport Worker, No. 3489/QD-BGTVT, September 20, 2005.

- In 2006:

- Government Emulation Flag, No. 100/QD-TTG, January 19, 2006, by the Prime Minister.
- First-Class Independence Order, No. 216/2006/CTN, February 15, 2006, by the President.
- Title of "Labor Hero," No. 420/2006/QD-CTN, March 24, 2006, by the President.
- Outstanding Emulation Flag from the Ministry of Transport, No. 57/QD-BGTVT, January 11, 2007.
- Emulation Flag from the Vietnam General Confederation of Labor, No. 561/QD-TLD, March 27, 2006, by Chairwoman Cù Thị Hậu.
- Emulation Flag from the Hai Phong City Federation of Labor, No. 86/QD-LDLĐ, from the Chairman of Hai Phong Federation of Labor.
- Certificate of Merit from the Ministry of Education and Training, No. 7566/QD-BGD&ĐT, December 22, 2006, by Minister Nguyễn Thiện Nhân.
- Two individuals awarded Third-Class Labor Orders.
- One individual awarded the national title of "Outstanding Worker."
- One People’s Teacher and five Distinguished Teachers recognized.

- In 2007:

- Government Emulation Flag, No. 08/QD-TTg, January 22, 2008, by Prime Minister Nguyễn Tấn Dũng.
- Outstanding Emulation Flag from the Ministry of Transport, No. 24/QD-BGTVT, January 4, 2008, by the Minister of Transport.
- Certificate of Merit from the Ministry of Education and Training, No. 115/QD-BGD&ĐT, January 5, 2007, by Deputy Minister Phạm Vũ Luận.
- Certificate of Merit from the People’s Committee of Hai Phong City, No. 226/QD-UBND, November 15, 2007, by Chairman Trịnh Quang Sử.
- Certificate of Merit from the Ministry of Education and Training for the University, No. 6378/QD-BGĐT, October 3, 2007, by Minister Nguyễn Thiện Nhân.
- Certificate of Merit from the Minister of Labor, Invalids, and Social Affairs, No. 1057/QD-BLĐTBXH, by Minister Nguyễn Thị Hằng.

- In 2008:

- Certificate of Merit from the Prime Minister, No. 100/QD-TTg, January 22, 2008, by Deputy Prime Minister Nguyễn Sinh Hùng.
- One group awarded the Third-Class Labor Order, No. 1573/QD-CTN by Vice President Nguyễn Thị Doan.
- Outstanding Emulation Flag from the Ministry of Transport, No. 3927/QD-BGTVT, December 29, 2008, by Minister Hồ Nghĩa Dũng.
- Certificate of Merit from the Prime Minister for one individual, No. 1565/QD-TTg, November 7, 2008, by Deputy Prime Minister Nguyễn Sinh Hùng.
- ISO Gold Cup.
- Certificate of Merit from the Vietnam Education Union, No. 411/QD-KTCĐGD, September 29, 2009, by Chairman Nguyễn Cảnh Dương.
- Certificate of Merit from the Hai Phong City People’s Committee for the University, No. 137/QD-UBND, August 19, 2008.
- Another Certificate of Merit from Hai Phong City People’s Committee, by Chairman Trịnh Quang Sử.

- In 2009-2010:

- Outstanding Emulation Flag from the Ministry of Transport.
- Emulation Flag from the Central Committee of the Ho Chi Minh Communist Youth Union.
- Emulation Flag from the Vietnam General Confederation of Labor, No. 94/QD-TLD, January 8, 2010, by Chairman Đặng Ngọc Tùng.
- First-Class Labor Order awarded to one group, No. 1142/QD-CTN, by Vice President Nguyễn Thị Doan.
- Second-Class Labor Order for one group (University Union), No. 388/QD-CTN, April 1, 2010.
- Third-Class Labor Order for one individual, No. 388/QD-CTN, April 1, 2010.
- One individual (Principal) awarded the title of National Outstanding Worker, No. 1260/QD-TTg, July 22, 2010.
- Prime Minister’s Certificate of Merit for two individuals, No. 31/QD-TTg, January 9, 2009.
- Certificate of Merit from the Minister of Transport for the University, No. 2589/QD-BGTVT, September 8, 2009.
- The Party Committee recognized for five consecutive years as a clean and strong Party.
- Certificate of Merit from the People’s Committee of Hai Phong City, No. 61/QD-UBND, January 29, 2010, by the Chairman of Hai Phong People’s Committee.

- In 2013:

- Certificate of Merit from the Chairman of Hai Phong People's Committee, No. 2101/QD-CT, October 21, 2013, for outstanding performance in the 2013-2014 academic year.
- Certificate of Merit from the Minister of Education and Training, No. 5831/QD-BGDDT, December 11, 2013, for excellence in organizing student scientific research activities.
- Certificate of Merit from the Minister of Education and Training, No. 5379/QD-BGDDT, November 14, 2013, for outstanding achievements in 2013.
- Certificate of Merit from the Minister of Transport, No. 3108/QD-BGTVT, October 29, 2013, for excellent achievements in 2013.
- Certificate of Merit from the Minister of Public Security, No. 16/QD-BCA, January 2, 2013, for outstanding contributions to the national security protection movement.

- In 2014:

- Government Emulation Flag for 2013, Decision No. 40/QD-TTg, January 8, 2014.
- Certificate of Merit from the Chairman of Hai Phong People's Committee, No. 170/QD-CT, January 6, 2014, for excellence in people-to-people diplomacy.
- Certificate of Merit from the Minister of Health, No. 2734/QD-BYT, July 24, 2014, for achievements in organizing the 2014 Red Journey.
- Second-Class Labor Order awarded by the President for the university’s Youth Union, No. 670/QD-CTN, March 14, 2014, for contributions to education and training.
- Two individuals awarded Second-Class Labor Orders, No. 670/QD-CTN, March 14, 2014, for contributions to education and training.
- Three individuals awarded Certificates of Merit from the Prime Minister, No. 295/QD-TTg, February 26, 2014, for contributions to national development and defense.
- Government Emulation Flag awarded for leading the national patriotic emulation movement in the transport sector, Decision No. 40/QD-TTg, January 8, 2014.

- In 2015:

- Government Emulation Flag for outstanding performance in 2015, Decision No. 2516/QD-TTg, December 31, 2015.

- In 2016:

- On April 1, 2016, the university was awarded the title of "Hero of the People's Armed Forces."

- In 2018:

- On April 1, 2018, the university received a certificate of accreditation from the Ministry of Education and Training and ranked among the top 15 universities in Vietnam.

- In 2019:

- On May 23, 2019, Associate Professor Phạm Xuân Dương was appointed as Rector of Vietnam Maritime University by Deputy Minister of Transport Nguyễn Văn Công.

== See also ==
- Universities in Vietnam
- Education in Vietnam
