= Dong Thap University =

Coordinates: 10°25′14″N 105°38′36″E

- Đại học Đồng Tháp
- Type: Public university
- Established: January 10, 2003; 23 years ago
- Rector: Hồ Văn Thống
- Undergraduates: ~8,000
- Address: 783 Phạm Hữu Lầu, Ward 6, Cao Lãnh, Đồng Tháp Province, Vietnam
- Campus: Rural
- Website: www.dthu.edu.vn

Dong Thap University (DThU) (Vietnamese: Đại học Đồng Tháp) is a Vietnamese public university based in the city of Cao Lãnh in Đồng Tháp province. It is one of the educational and research institutions in the Mekong Delta region of Vietnam.

== History ==
The school was established in 1989 as a normal school under the moniker Dong Thap Pedagogical College (Vietnamese: Trường Cao đẳng Sư phạm Đồng Tháp). On January 10, 2003, officials released a decree that upgraded the school's official status from vocational college to a university. On September 4, 2008, officials expanded the school's scope and approved a change in name to Dong Thap University. In 2017, the university's degree programs received full accreditation and certification by the Vietnam National University system. In the 2016–2017 academic year, it became the first university in the Mekong Delta certified to meet the quality standards by the Ministry of Education and Training.

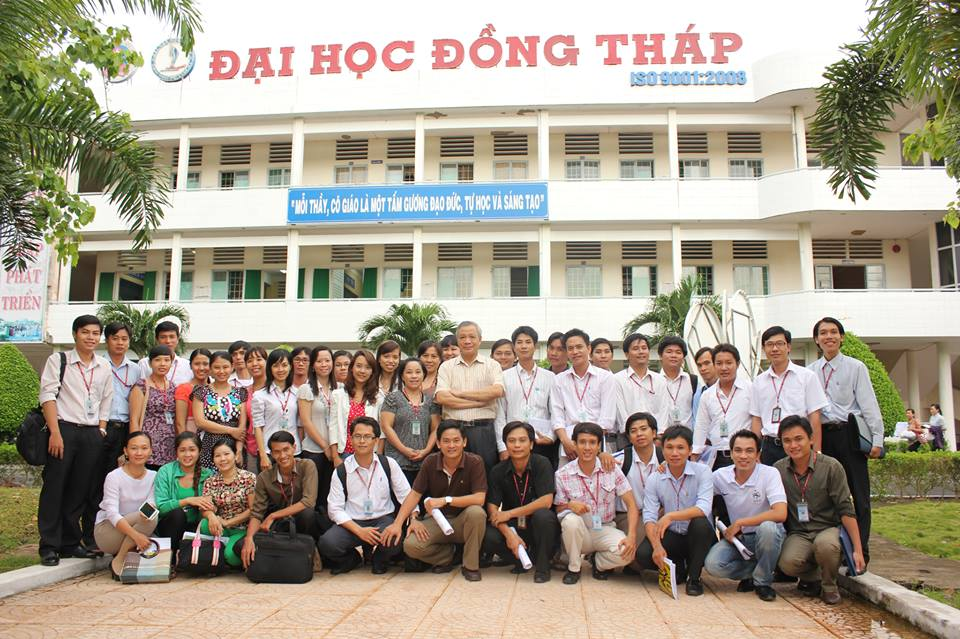
Class photo in front of campus

== Description ==
The current rector of the university is Ho Van Thong. The school offers 32 undergraduate major and 6 graduate degrees. In 2016, the rectors claimed that 92% of the school's lecturers held postgraduate qualifications.

=== Admissions ===
In 2019, the university announced it would refund the tuition of graduates from their Math, Chemistry, and Primary School Pedagogy departments if they are not able to secure a job after graduating with a degree from the university. The rector's announcement was made as an effort to both showcase the high rates of employment among their alumni and the efforts the university was making to create a job pipeline

In 2021, Dong Thap began interviewing applicants to assess them on criteria beyond test scores, as an effort to identify high performing students that may not meet Vietnamese score-focused educational conventions.

=== Student body ===
The university has approximately 8,000 students enrolled. Students organize a number of activities and clubs, such as a campus-wide book club and a championship futsal team. The school also has employs a human resources unit solely focused on ensuring graduating students have jobs after graduation.

=== Research ===
The university publishes its own "Dong Thap University Journal of Science".

== School of Education ==
- Faculty of Primary and Preschool Education
- Faculty of Mathematics and Computer Science Education
- Faculty of Natural Sciences Education
- Faculty of Social Sciences Education
- Faculty of Political Education and Educational Management
- Faculty of Physical Education - Arts Pedagogy

== Faculties ==
- Faculty of Foreign Languages
- Faculty of Technology and Engineering
- Faculty of Economics and Law
- Faculty of Agriculture, Natural Resources, and Environment
- Faculty of Culture - Tourism, and Social Work

== Offices ==
- Office of Personnel and Legal Affairs
- Office of Administration and General Services
- Office of Planning and Finance
- Office of Academic Affairs
- Office of Graduate Studies
- Office of Party and Students Affairs
- Office of Quality Assurance
- Office of International Affairs and Communications
- Office of Science and Technology
- Office of Equipment and Infrastructure Development

== Centres ==
- Centre for Partnership and Professional Development
- Foreign Languages and Informatics Centre
- Centre for Innovation, Entrepreneurship, and Events
- Le Vu Hung Resources Centre
- DThU Services Centre
- Hoa Hong Pedagogical Practice Kindergarten
- Pedagogical Practice Integrated School (Under the Establishment Decision of the Dong Thap Provincial People's Committee)
