= Irregular bow-fingered gecko =

Conservation status
- Data Deficient (IUCN 3.1)

Scientific classification
- Kingdom: Animalia
- Phylum: Chordata
- Class: Reptilia
- Order: Squamata
- Suborder: Gekkota
- Family: Gekkonidae
- Genus: Cyrtodactylus
- Species: C. irregularis

Binomial name
- Cyrtodactylus irregularis (M.A. Smith, 1921)

Synonyms
- Gymnodactylus peguensis var. irregularis M.A. Smith, 1921; Gymnodactylus irregularis — Wermuth, 1965; Cyrtodactylus irregularis — Rösler, 2000

Species of lizard

The irregular bow-fingered gecko (Cyrtodactylus irregularis) is a species of lizard in the family Gekkonidae. The species is endemic to Vietnam.

== Description ==
C. irregularis may attain a snout-to-vent length (SVL) of 79 mm (3.1 in). Dorsally, it is grayish-brown, with dark brown, white-edged, angular spots or crossbands. A curved band extends across the nape of the neck from eye to eye. Ventrally, it is whitish.

== Reproduction ==
C. irregularis is oviparous.
