= Academy of Public Administration and Governance =

- Học viện Hành chính và Quản trị công
- Former name: School of Administration
- Motto: ● Proud of tradition - Looking to the future - For career development ● Study for real, take real exams to get a real job in real life.
- Type: Academy (public school)
- Established: May 29, 1959
- Director: Nguyễn Bá Chiến
- Location: Hà Nội city, Đà Nẵng city, Đắk Lắk province and Hồ Chí Minh city (Saigon), Vietnam
- Colors: Crimson Red; Delft Blue
- Nicknames: Oxford Xuân La - Xuân Đỉnh; School of 3 regions
- Website: apag.edu.vn

Academy of Public Administration and Governance (APAG; Vietnamese: Học viện Hành chính và Quản trị công), formerly National Academy of Public Administration (NAPA), is a special-class public service unit within Vietnam's national education system, operating under the Ho Chi Minh National Academy of Politics. As a key national academy, it serves as Vietnam's central institution for training and fostering officials, civil servants, and state managers in public administration, leadership, and management.

NAPA also conducts research and provides policy consultation for the Ministry of Home Affairs and the Government of Vietnam.

On September 15, 2022, the Vietnamese government issued Decree No. 63/2022/ND-CP to merge Hanoi University of Home Affairs into NAPA. This merger, formalized by Decision No. 27/2022/QD-TTg on December 19, 2022, took effect on January 1, 2023.

== History ==
School of Administration (May 1959 – September 1961)

On May 29, 1959, Deputy Prime Minister and Minister of Home Affairs Phan Ke Toai signed Decree No. 214-NV to establish the School of Administration under the Ministry of Home Affairs, tasked with training district-level government officials. Initially based in Phu Luu village, Xuan Hong commune, Tu Son district, Bac Ninh province, the school held its first training course from October 16, 1959, to January 16, 1960, for 216 district and provincial officials. Deputy Prime Minister Phan Ke Toai presided over the opening and closing ceremonies, with lectures delivered by prominent Party and government leaders, including Truong Chinh, Hoang Quoc Viet, and Tran Huu Duc.

Central School of Administration (September 1961 – May 1980)

On September 29, 1961, according to Decree No. 130-CP of the Government, the School of Administration was renamed the Central School of Administration.

The headquarters of the Central School of Administration was built on a land area of about 15,000 m^{2}, address at: No. 77 Nguyen Chi Thanh Street, Lang Ha Ward, Dong Da District, Hanoi City. On May 18, 1961, construction began on the project, and on April 25, 1962, the project was completed and put into use. The National Academy of Public Administration is currently working at this facility.

When the American empire expanded the war to the North, from September 1965 to the end of 1968, Truong evacuated to Dong Coi commune, Thuan Thanh district, He Bac province. Here, the School continues to open training classes for district-level government officials to serve the resistance war against the US to save the country.

Since mid-1972, the Government has advocated separating the government from the Ministry of Home Affairs and transferring it to the Prime Minister's Office of Internal Affairs. The Ministry of Home Affairs at this time only does war invalids and social affairs, so the School only conducts training for war invalids and social workers.

In the South, in May 1974, the Southern Government Cadre School was established in the Eastern war zone with Nguyen Ngoc Sat (aka Ba Linh) as Principal. After the South was liberated, on October 30, 1976, the Prime Minister issued Decision No. 213-CP to establish the Central Administrative School Branch in the South. The branch belongs to the Central Organizing Committee of the Communist Party of Vietnam of the Government of Vietnam, located at the location of the National Academy of Administration of the former Saigon Republic of Vietnam, No. 10, Street 03/02, Ward 12, District 10, Ho Chi Minh City - Saigon (National Academy of Public Administration facility today). The branch is headed by Doanh Thang Lung (also known as Ba Lung) and Nguyen Ngoc Sat (also known as Ba Linh) as Vice Principals (there is no Principal).

On March 30, 1977, the Government Council issued Decision No. 81/CP to transfer the Central Administrative School from under the Ministry of Home Affairs to under the Central Organizing Committee of the Communist Party of Vietnam of the Government of Vietnam. The Central School of Administration continues its mission of training government officials to serve in the work of protecting peace and building the country.

On August 30, 1977, the Government Council issued Decision No. 231-CP transferring the Central Administrative School from the Central Organizing Committee of the Communist Party of Vietnam of the Government of Vietnam to directly under the Prime Minister's Office. The school is responsible for training and fostering senior state management officials in central agencies; presidents, vice presidents, members of the People's Committees of provinces, districts and the equivalent; officers in charge of departments and agencies of provinces and cities; officials doing organizational work at the provincial and city levels; teaching staff at Administrative Schools (now Political Schools) of provinces and cities. According to the above decision, the Central School of Administration has branches in charge of the following areas:

– The Central Administrative School official headquarters located in Hanoi city is responsible for training and fostering officials for the Northern provinces.

– The Central Administrative School branch located in Ho Chi Minh city is responsible for training and fostering officials for the Southern provinces.

– The Central Administrative School branch located in Quang Nam - Da Nang province is responsible for training and fostering officials for the Central provinces.

But in reality, the Central School of Administration only has two campuses in Hanoi city and Ho Chi Minh city operating under the direct direction of Duong Van Phuc - Deputy Head of the Government Office.

Central School of Administration and Economics (May 1980 - June 1981)

On May 12, 1980, the Government Council issued Decision No. 142-CP merging the Central School of Administration and the Central School of Economics into the Central School of Administration and Economics. Professor Mai Huu Khue - former Principal of the School of Economics and Planning - was appointed Principal. Implementing the Agreement signed between the Government of Vietnam and the Government of the Soviet Union, the School opened training courses on economic management for middle and senior officials taught by Soviet professors.

Central School of Administration (June 1981 – November 1990)

On June 8, 1981, the Government Council issued Decision No. 233-CP separating the Central School of Administration and Economics into two schools: Central School of Administration and Central School of Economic Management. Central School of Administration belongs to the Government. Duong Van Dat - former Deputy Minister of Finance - was appointed Principal.

On September 26, 1981, the Council of Ministers (now the Government) issued Decision No. 91/HDBT on the tasks and organizational structure of the Central School of Administration. From here, the school has a relatively complete legal basis to operate, has continuously strived to improve, made basic advances, consolidated and unified the school campus in Hanoi city and its branch. School in Ho Chi Minh City, bringing together Administrative Schools (now Political Schools) of provinces and cities, forming a system of Administrative Schools with the task of fostering and training state administrative management officials. from central to local levels, creating momentum for further development of the university in the new period.

On April 9, 1987, Professor Doan Trong Truyen - former Minister and General Secretary of the Council of Ministers - was appointed Rector according to Decision No. 121-CT of the Chairman of the Council of Ministers. The school has transformed the content and methods of training government officials to suit practical requirements and expanded international cooperation.

National School of Administration (November 1990 – July 1992)

On November 1, 1990, the Central School of Administration was renamed the National School of Administration by Decision No. 381-CT of the Chairman of the Council of Ministers (now the Government of Vietnam). The school, in collaboration with relevant agencies, proposed a project to reform national administration.

On December 1, 1991, Prof. Dr. Nguyen Duy Gia, former Governor of the State Bank of Vietnam and Vice Principal of the National School of Administration, was appointed Principal.

National Academy of Public Administration (July 1992 - May 2007)

On July 6, 1992, the National School of Administration was renamed the National Academy of Administration according to Decree No. 253-HDBT of the Council of Ministers (now the Government). Professor, Dr. Nguyen Duy Gia was appointed Director of the academy. From here, the National Academy of Public Administration functions as a center for civil servant training and administrative scientific research of the whole country, has strong comprehensive development and achievements in many aspects. ; There are obvious changes in the scale and quality of training and fostering for state officials and civil servants.

On December 16, 1997, Prof. Dr. Nguyen Duy Gia resigned as Director. Prof.Dr. Vu Huy Tu - former Deputy Head of the Government Office, deputy director of the academy - was assigned the responsibility of Deputy Executive Director according to Decision No. 108/TTg of the Prime Minister.

On September 25, 1998, Dr. Nguyen Ngoc Hien - former Deputy Minister of Justice - was appointed Director according to Decision No. 885/TTg of the Prime Minister.

On December 31, 2006, Dr. Nguyen Ngoc Hien resigned as Director of the academy.

On January 1, 2007, Associate Professor. Dr. Nguyen Huu Khien - Deputy Director of the academy was assigned the responsibility of Deputy Executive Director according to Decision No. 09/QD-BNV dated January 8, 2007 of the Minister of Home Affairs on assignment to perform executive tasks. working activities of the National Academy of Public Administration.

- Decision No. 123/2002/QD-TTg dated September 19, 2002 of the Prime Minister, the academy was transferred from an agency under the Government to the Ministry of Home Affairs.

On November 13, 2003, the Prime Minister issued Decision No. 234/2003/QD-TTg on the functions, tasks, powers and organizational structure of the National Academy of Public Administration. Among them, determine:

– The National Academy of Public Administration is a public service organization of the Ministry of Home Affairs and is under the state management of the Ministry of Home Affairs.

– The National Academy of Public Administration is a national center, autonomous and responsible for organizational structure, staffing and finance according to the provisions of law; Performing functions: training and fostering cadres, civil servants, state employees, administrative civil servant positions at all levels, cadres, grassroots civil servants, reserve civil servants, teaching staff Students and researchers specializing in public administration and management; Research administrative science and advise the Government in the field of Public Administration and State Management.

– The National Academy of Public Administration has a seal depicting the Vietnamese National Emblem.

– National Academy of Public Administration has training and fostering systems:

+ Training system, fostering knowledge about Public Administration and State Management.

+ Pre-service training system.

+ University training system specializing in formal, informal and post-graduate administration with majors in the field of Public Administration and State Management.

+ Training and fostering system for lecturers and researchers in Public Administration and State Management.

+ Specialized training and fostering system.

– The National Academy of Public Administration has its headquarters located in the Northern region (Hanoi city) and branch campuses in the following regions: Southern region (Ho Chi Minh City), Centralern region (Hue city of Thua Thien - Hue province) and the Central Highlands region of the Centralern region (Buon Ma Thuot city of Dak Lak province)

Academy of Public Administration (May 2007 - June 2014)

From May 2007 to June 2014, the National Academy of Public Administration and the Ho Chi Minh National Academy of Politics were merged according to Decision No. 60-QD/TW dated May 7, 2007 of the Politburo. The National Academy of Administration was renamed the Academy of Administration under the Ho Chi Minh National Academy of Politics and Administration.

Associate Professor, Dr. Nguyen Trong Dieu - former Deputy Minister of Home Affairs was appointed Director of the Academy of Public Administration according to Decision No. 529-QDNS/TW dated August 18, 2007 of the Central Executive Committee.

From July 1, 2009, to 2014, Associate Professor, Dr. Nguyen Dang Thanh - Deputy Director of Ho Chi Minh National Academy of Politics and Administration - Secretary of the Party Committee of Ho Chi Minh National Academy of Politics and Administration was appointed Appointed as Director of the Academy of Administration.

National Academy of Public Administration [Vietnam] (July 2014 - now)

On December 10, 2013, the Government of Vietnam issued Resolution No. 121/NQ-CP, which resolved: "Separating the Academy of Administration from the Ho Chi Minh National Academy of Politics and Administration to the Ministry of Home Affairs". service according to Conclusion No. 64-KL/TU dated May 28, 2013 of the 7th Conference of the 11th Party Central Committee; Document No. 176-CV/TU dated October 23, 2013 of the Secretariat and called the National Academy of Public Administration".

On the afternoon of July 8, 2014, at the National Academy of Public Administration, the Ministry of Home Affairs and the Ho Chi Minh National Academy of Politics held the Handover Ceremony of the National Academy of Public Administration from the Ho Chi Minh National Academy of Politics. Minh returned to the Ministry of Home Affairs under the chairmanship of deputy director of the Ho Chi Minh National Academy of Politics - Associate Professor, PhD. Truong Thi Thong and Deputy Minister of Home Affairs - Dr. Nguyen Tien Dinh.

On January 23, 2018, Prime Minister Nguyen Xuan Phuc signed Decision No. 05/2018/QD-TTg regulating the functions, tasks, powers and organizational structure of the National Academy of Public Administration, in which regulations: The academy "is a special-class key public service unit under the national education system under the Ministry of Home Affairs; a national center that performs the functions of training, capacity building, and innovation." Knowledge and skills in administration, leadership and management for officials, civil servants and public employees; human resource training; administrative scientific research and consulting for the Ministry of Home Affairs in the field of Public Administration and State Administration".

Merging Hanoi University of Home Affairs into the National Academy of Public Administration [Vietnam] (January 1, 2023 - now)

On September 15, 2022, the Government of Vietnam issued Decree No. 63/2022/ND-CP regulating the functions, tasks, powers and organizational structure of the Ministry of Home Affairs. In particular, the regulation stipulates that Hanoi University of Home Affairs merges into the National Academy of Public Administration (Vietnam). On December 19, 2022, the Prime Minister of Vietnam issued Decision No. 27/2022/QD-TTg regulating the functions, tasks, powers and organizational structure of the National Academy of Public Administration (Vietnam) under the Ministry of Home Affairs. Among them, the decision to merge Hanoi University of Home Affairs into the National Academy of Public Administration (Vietnam). These merger regulations and decisions will officially be implemented on January 1, 2023.

Hanoi University of Home Affairs is responsible for transferring all of the school's existing personnel, finances, and assets to the academy. The National Academy of Public Administration is responsible for receiving, arranging, arranging, managing and using personnel, finance and assets of Hanoi University of Home Affairs according to regulations; Develop a plan for financial autonomy, a plan for managing and handling finances and assets according to the provisions of law and submit it to competent authorities for approval. The National Academy of Public Administration receives and organizes the implementation of training and fostering tasks of Hanoi University of Home Affairs, ensuring the rights of practitioners and students; issue diplomas and certificates to trainees and students according to the provisions of law; Inheriting all rights and obligations of Hanoi University of Home Affairs, which has been implemented. Speaking at the conference, Minister of Home Affairs Pham Thi Thanh Tra emphasized that this is an important and meaningful event in the development and growth of the National Academy of Public Administration, and is also a step forward. turning point in the development of Hanoi University of Home Affairs and emphasized that in recent times, the two units have tried and overcome many difficulties and challenges to cultivate and build a glorious tradition. That process has made a very important contribution to the development of the Home Affairs sector, the Ministry of Home Affairs, the Party and the State.

December 30, 2022, Decision No. 1279/QD-BNV of the Transfer of Directorship of the National Academy of Public Administration to associate professor, Dr. Nguyen Ba Chien and Decision No. 1278/QD-BNV supplementing Appointed Mr. Nguyen Quoc Suu as Permanent Deputy Director of the National Academy of Public Administration.

On January 31, 2023, Minister of Home Affairs Pham Thi Thanh Tra signed Decision No. 39/QD-BNV, officially appointing associate professor, Dr. Nguyen Ba Chien - who once held the position of acting director of the Academy National Administration and former Principal of Hanoi University of Home Affairs became Director of the National Academy of Administration.

== Previous names ==
- National Academy of Public Administration (Vietnam) has gone through many different names:

- School of Administration (period from 1959 to 1961).
- Central School of Administration (1961 to 1980).
- Central School of Administration and Economics (1980 to 1981).
- Central School of Administration (1981 to 1990).
- National School of Administration (1990 to 1992).
- (Vietnam) National Academy of Public Administration (1992 to 2007).
- Academy of Public Administration (2007 to 2014).
- (Vietnam) National Academy of Public Administration (2014 to 2023).
- Academy of Public Administration and Governance (2023 to present)

== Current leadership ==
- Academy Board of Directors:
  - (Vietnam) National Academy of Public Administration:
    - Associate Professor. Dr. Nguyen Ba Chien - Director.
    - Associate Professor. Dr. Nguyen Quoc Suu - Standing Deputy Director.
    - Associate Professor. Dr. Luong Thanh Cuong - Deputy Director.
    - Dr. Lai Duc Vuong - Deputy Director.
    - Dr. Nguyen Dang Que - Deputy Director.
- Board of Directors of Branches:
  - Branch of the (Vietnam) National Academy of Public Administration in the Central region:
    - Associate Professor, PhD. Nguyen Hoang Hien - Acting Director of the institute.
    - Dr. Tran Dinh Chin - Deputy Director of the institute.
  - Branch of the (Vietnam) National Academy of Public Administration in the Central Highlands region:
    - Dr. Thieu Huy Thuat - Deputy Director of the institute.
  - Branch of the (Vietnam) National Academy of Public Administration in the Southern region (in Ho Chi Minh City):
    - Associate Professor. Dr. Huynh Van Thoi - Acting Director of the institute.
    - Dr. Truong Cong Hoa - Deputy Director of the Standing Institute.
    - Dr. Nguyen Thi Phuong - Deputy Director of the institute.

== Organizational structure ==
Faculties, departments, and affiliated units

I. Subordinate and affiliated units (Department level):

1. Room Office.
2. Personnel Organization Department.
3. Planning and Finance Department.
4. International Cooperation Department.
5. Training Management Board.
6. Training Management Board.
7. Faculty of Administration.
8. Faculty of State and Law.
9. Faculty of Social Management.
10. Faculty of Economic Management.
11. Faculty of Human Resource Management.
12. Department of Archives and Office Administration.
13. Faculty of Interdisciplinary Sciences.
14. Faculty of Foreign Languages - Informatics.
15. Institute of Administrative Sciences Research.
16. State Management Journal.
17. Technology Center and Library.
18. Testing Center and quality assurance of training and development.
19. Branch of the (Vietnam) National Academy of Public Administration in the Centralern region
20. Branch of the (Vietnam) National Academy of Public Administration in the Central Highlands region.
21. Branch of the (Vietnam) National Academy of Public Administration in the Southern region (in Ho Chi Minh city).

II. Units established by the Academy Director (department level):

1. Party - Union Office.

Socio - political organizations

- Union of (Vietnam) National Academy of Public Administration.
- Communist Youth Union of the (Vietnam) National Academy of Public Administration.
- Association of Students and Alumni of the (Vietnam) National Academy of Public Administration.
- Veterans Association of the (Vietnam) National Academy of Public Administration.
- Association of Former Teachers of the (Vietnam) National Academy of Public Administration.

== Education program ==
The academy organizes 4 training systems:

After university.

Training cadres, civil servants and public employees.

Specialized training.

- Regular university system and joint training:

- 14 majors for bachelor's degrees:
1. Office Administration major.
2. Human Resource Management major.
3. Law major.
4. Department of State Administration major.
5. Party Construction and State Government sector major.
6. Department of Archives major.
7. Department of Political Science major.
8. Information Systems industry major.
9. Information and Library industry major.
10. Cultural Management major.
11. Department of Cultural Studies major.
12. Tourism & Travel Service Management major.
13. English Language Department major.
14. Department of Economics major.

- Postgraduate training system:

- 7 majors for master's degrees:
1. Public Administration Management major (also known as Public Administration major).
2. Public Policy major.
3. Banking and Financial sector major.
4. Constitutional Law and Administrative Law major.
5. Economic Management major.
6. Cultural Management major.
7. Department of Archives major.
- 1 major for PhD degree:
1. Public Administration Management major (also known as Public Administration major).

== Training cooperation ==
The National Academy of Public Administration (Vietnam) has actively engaged in international cooperation and training, establishing partnerships with prestigious institutions such as École nationale d'administration(since replaced by Institut national du service public), Université du Québec (Canada), Tampere University (Finland), University of Tokyo (Japan), and the Lee Kuan Yew School of Public Policy (Singapore).

The academy offers master's programs in public administration and public financial management in collaboration with internationally renowned institutions. It also conducts short courses in English for officials from countries including Laos, Cambodia, Bangladesh, and India, focusing on administrative reform, state management, and regional integration. The academy has become a key hub for public management training in the region and is a state-level member of several international organizations like the Eastern Regional Organization of Public Administration (EROPA)

== Directors ==
No.	Director	Time in office
1	Tô Quang Đẩu	1959 - 1961
2	Nguyễn Văn Ngọc	1961 - 1963
3	Lưu Văn Xằn	1963 - 1974
4	Mai Trọng Định	1974 - 1980
5	Mai Hữu Khuê	1980 - 1981
6	Dương Văn Dật	1981 - 1987
7	Đoàn Trọng Truyến	1987 - 1990
8	Nguyễn Duy Gia	1991 - 1997
9	Nguyễn Ngọc Hiến	1998 - 2006
10	Nguyễn Trọng Điều	2006 - 2009
11	Nguyễn Đăng Thành	2009 - 2014
12	Trần Anh Tuấn	2014 - 2015
13	Triệu Văn Cường	2015 - 2017
14	Đặng Xuân Hoan	2017 - 2023
15	Nguyễn Bá Chiến	2023 - present

== Achievement ==
National Academy of Public Administration (Vietnam) and Hanoi University of Home Affairs (former) were honored to receive many awards from the Party and State of Vietnam such as:

- Vietnam Labor Medal.
- Vietnam Independence Medal.
- Vietnam Resistance Medal.
- Vietnam Victory Medal.
- Vietnam Ho Chi Minh Medal.
- Vietnam Gold Star Medal.
- Laos Friendship Medal.
- Laos Freedom Medal (Itxala Medal).
- Laos Labor Medal.
- Title of Vietnamese Labor Hero.
- Title of Hero of the Vietnam People's Armed Forces.
- Title of Outstanding Teacher in Vietnam.
- Title of Vietnam People's Teacher.
- Medal for the cause of building trade unions of the Vietnam General Confederation of Labor.
- Medal for the cause of vocational education from the Ministry of Education and Training.
- Medal for the Cause of Culture, Sports and Tourism of the Ministry of Culture, Sports and Tourism.
- Medal for the cause of state organization of the Ministry of Home Affairs.
- Medal for the cause of protecting the Party from the Party Committee of central agencies.
- Medal for National Security Protection from the Ministry of Public Security.
- Medal of Archives of the Ministry of Home Affairs.
- Medal for the cause of Vietnamese Journalism from the Vietnam Journalists Association.
- Hung Vuong Medal of the People's Committee of Ha Bac province and Vinh Phu province.
- Certificate of Merit from the Prime Minister of Vietnam.
- Certificate of Merit from the Government of Vietnam.
- Certificate of Merit from the Ministry of Home Affairs.
- Certificate of Merit from the Ministry of Education and Training.
- Certificate of Merit from the Ministry of Public Security.
- Many certificates of merit and awards from the Hanoi People's Committee, the Central Executive Committee of the Ho Chi Minh Communist Youth Union and the Vietnam General Confederation of Labor (Vietnam Trade Union).
- The school's Party Committee has been awarded the title "Clean Party" and "Strong Party" for many years.
- The school's Trade Union and Communist Youth Union have won many titles for many years in a row.
- The unit has won emulation flags and awards for 8 consecutive years from the Ministry of Home Affairs, the Ministry of Education and Training and the Government of Vietnam.

== Notable alumni and students ==
1. Nguyễn Xuân Phúc - Former Politburo member, Former Prime Minister of the Socialist Republic of Vietnam Vietnamese meaning, Former President of the Socialist Republic of Vietnam.
2. Nguyễn Thiện Nhân - Former Politburo member, Former Secretary of Ho Chi Minh City Party Committee, Former Deputy Prime Minister of the Socialist Republic of Vietnam.
3. Trương Thị Mai - Politburo member, Standing member of the Secretariat, Head of the Central Organizing Committee of the Communist Party of Vietnam, Former Permanent Secretary of the Ho Chi Minh Communist Youth Union, Former Chairman of the National Assembly Social Affairs Committee of the Socialist Republic of Vietnam, Former Head of the Central Mass Mobilization Committee of the Communist Party of Vietnam.
4. Trần Lưu Quang - Member of the Party Central Committee, Deputy Prime Minister of the Socialist Republic of Vietnam.
5. Nguyễn Lâm Thành - Member of the Party Central Committee, Vice Chairman of the National Assembly Ethnic Council of the Socialist Republic of Vietnam.
6. Võ Thị Ánh Xuân - Member of the Party Central Committee, Vice President of the Socialist Republic of Vietnam.
7. Trương Tấn Sang - Former Politburo member, Former Secretary of Ho Chi Minh City Party Committee, Former Head of the Central Judicial Reform Steering Committee of the Communist Party of Vietnam, Former President of the Socialist Republic of Vietnam.
8. Nguyễn Phú Trọng - Politburo member, Former President of the Socialist Republic of Vietnam, Former Chairman of the National Assembly of the Socialist Republic of Vietnam, General Secretary of the Central Committee of the Communist Party of Vietnam.
9. Nguyễn Tấn Dũng - Former Politburo member, Former Governor of the State Bank of Vietnam, Former Permanent Deputy Prime Minister of the Government of the Socialist Republic of Vietnam, Former Prime Minister of the Socialist Republic of Vietnam Vietnamese meaning.
10. Nguyễn Hồng Diên - Member of the Party Central Committee, Minister of Ministry Industry and Trade.
11. Lê Hùng Dũng - Former Chairman of Vietnam Youth Tourism Company Limited, Former Chairman of Vietnam Football Federation - VFF.
12. Võ Văn Thưởng - Former Politburo member, Former Head of the Central Propaganda Department of the Communist Party of Vietnam, Former Standing Secretary of the Central Committee of the Communist Party of Vietnam, Former Head of the Central Judicial Reform Steering Committee of the Communist Party of Vietnam, Former President of the Socialist Republic of Vietnam.
13. Hun Sen - Former Prime Minister of Cambodia, President of the Cambodian People's Party, President of the Senate, Chairman of the Supreme Advisory Council of the King of Cambodia.
