= Huế University =

Public university in Huế, Vietnam

Coordinates: 16°27′30″N 107°34′47″E

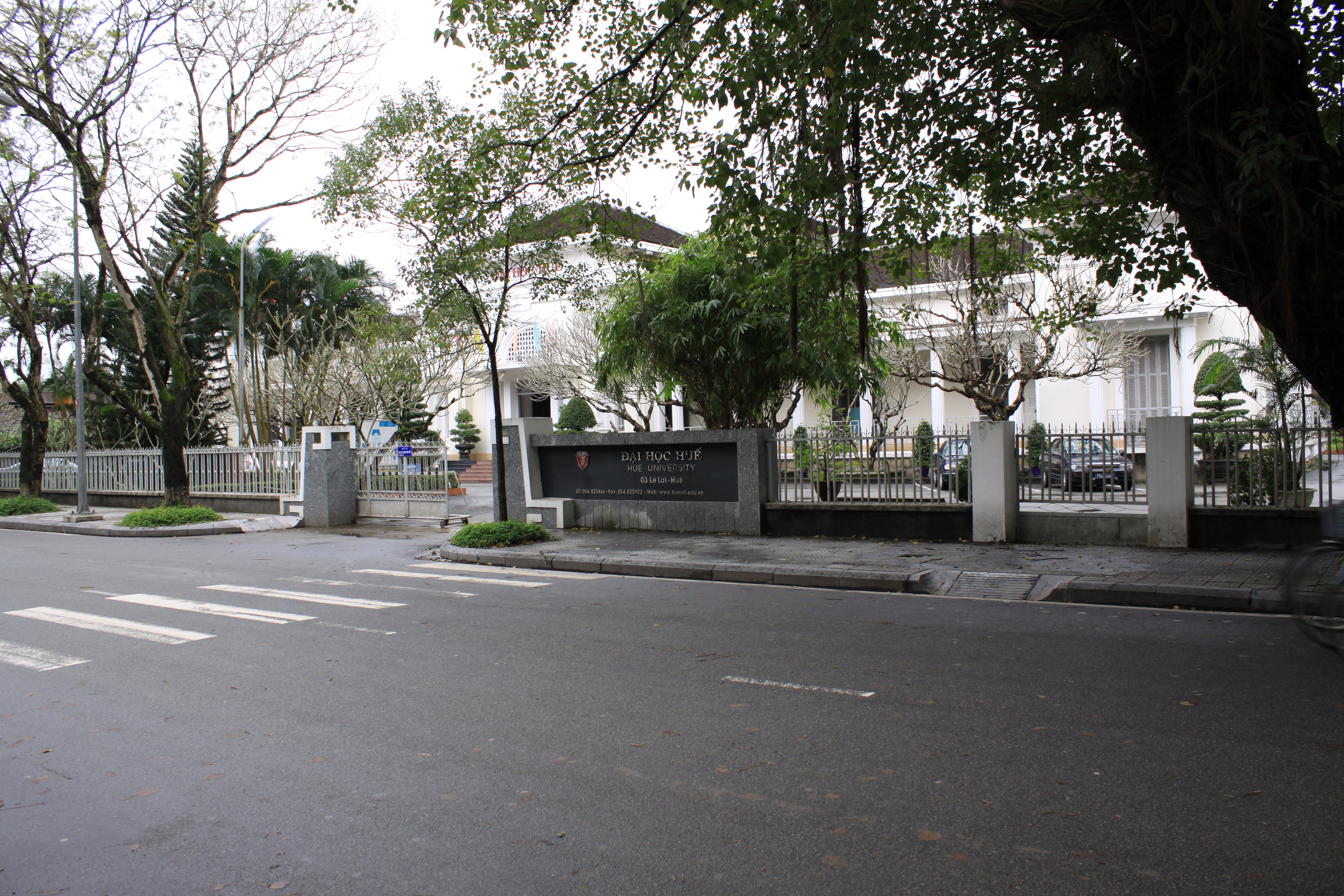
- Established: 1957
- President: Prof. Dr. Nguyen Vu Quoc Huy (as the Acting Director)
- Location: Huế, Viet Nam
- Website: https://hueuni.edu.vn

Huế University (Vietnamese: Đại học Huế) is a public, research-oriented university system located in Huế, the former imperial capital of Vietnam; it is one of the important regional universities of Vietnam. In Vietnam, universities are classified into two classes: university system (two types are national university and regional university) and university (or college).

== History ==
During the division of Vietnam; Huế University, formerly known as The University of Huế (Viện Đại học Huế), was established by a decree of South Vietnamese President Ngô Đình Diệm in March 1957. Under the academic division, it originally comprised four colleges: Science, Literature, Law, and Education. The first rector was Professor Nguyễn Quang Trình (March 1, 1957–July 1957), succeeded by Father Cao Văn Luận. By 1959, the university had added a preparatory medical program. In 1961, its Medical School was also established.

During the Vietnam War, Huế University became a focal point of intense fighting between US Marines and communist forces during the Tet Offensive. News coverage depicted scenes of urban warfare as Marines fought to gain control of two city blocks around the university and the provincial headquarters. The university and surrounding buildings were heavily damaged as Marines blasted holes through homes and university structures, encountering resistance from communist forces manning machine guns.

After the reunification of the country in 1975, independent universities were established in Hue on the basis of the existing faculties of The University of Hue. According to the Government Decree No. 30/ND-CP dated 4 April 1994, Hue University has been re-established by reorganizing all Hue-based universities. Hue University is responsible for training students at undergraduate and postgraduate levels, conducting research and applying science and technology in a multitude of disciplines to serve the construction and development of the country in general and Central Vietnam and Western Highlands in particular.

== Organization structure ==
- University Council
- Science and Education Council
- Council for Information Technology applications
- Council for Quality Assurance
- Academic member colleges and schools
  - University of Sciences, Hue University
  - University of Education, Hue University
  - University of Agriculture and Forestry, Hue University
  - University of Medicine and Pharmacy, Hue University
  - University of Arts, Hue University
  - University of Economics, Hue University
  - University of Foreign Languages, Hue University
  - University of Law, Hue University
  - School of Tourism and Hospitality
  - School of Physical Education
  - International School
  - School of Engineering and Technology
  - Hue University Quang Tri Branch
- Administrative departments
  - Office for university administration
  - Academic Affairs
  - Science, Technology and International Relations
  - Planning and Finance
  - Personnel and Organisation
  - Student Relations
  - Facility Management
  - Testing
  - Legalism
  - Inspection
- Centers
  - Center for Educational QA
  - Institute for Bio Technology
  - Institute for Natural Resources and Environment
  - Center for International Education
  - Center for Incubation and Tech Transfer
  - Distance Education Center
  - Learning Resource Centre
  - ICT Center
  - Student Service Center
  - National Defence Education Center

== Rankings ==
QS World University Rankings ranked Huế University in the 451-500 band of top universities in Asia and 6th in Vietnam for 2019. The QS World University Rankings ranked the university 348th in Asia in 2025.

== See also ==
- List of universities in Vietnam
