= Vietnam Aviation Academy =

- Học Viện Hàng Không Việt Nam
- Type: Public
- Established: 17 July 2006
- Location: Ho Chi Minh City, Vietnam
- Campus: Urban
- Website: https://vaa.edu.vn/

Vietnam Aviation Academy (abbreviated VAA, Vietnamese: Học Viện Hàng Không Việt Nam) is a Vietnamese university specializing in aviation-related courses. The university is operated by the Ministry of Construction.

The academy has two campuses in Ho Chi Minh City, located in Tân Bình District and Phú Nhuận District. It also has a campus in Cam Ranh, Khánh Hòa Province. It offers bachelor's degrees in business administration, electronics and telecommunications engineering, and air traffic management.
