= Vinh University =

Public university in Vinh, Vietnam

- Trường Đại học Vinh
- Type: Public
- Established: July 16, 1959
- Academic staff: 1,046 (731 lecturers)
- Students: 16,362
- Undergraduates: 14,066
- Postgraduates: 2,120
- Doctoral students: 176
- Location: 182 Lê Duẩn, Vinh, Nghệ An, Vietnam
- Campus: Multiple (5 campuses)
- Website: vinhuni.edu.vn

Vinh University (Vietnamese: Trường Đại học Vinh) is a public university in North Central Vietnam. It is a multidisciplinary institution providing high-quality human resources and serving as a center for scientific research, innovation, and policy consultation for Nghệ An Province and the North Central region. The university is recognized as one of Vietnam's key national universities and is being developed into a multi-member university system. It operates under the Ministry of Education and Training and is one of eight institutions selected for teacher training and educational management development nationwide.

== History ==
Vinh University was established on July 16, 1959, by Decree No. 375/NĐ of the Minister of Education as the Vinh Pedagogical University Branch (Phân hiệu Đại học Sư phạm Vinh). It initially focused on teacher training with 17 lecturers and 158 students in Mathematics-Physics and Literature-History departments. The first rector was Professor Nguyễn Thúc Hào, who led the university's early development.

In 1962, it was renamed Vinh Pedagogical University. On April 25, 2001, it was upgraded to Vinh University by Prime Ministerial Decision No. 62/2001/QĐ-TTg, expanding to multidisciplinary training while maintaining a core focus on pedagogy. Over the years, it has grown significantly, celebrating its 65th anniversary in 2024.

== Academics ==
Vinh University offers training at multiple levels: undergraduate (57 programs), master's (38 specialties), and doctoral (17 specialties), with a total enrollment of nearly 35,000 students, including 22,000 full-time students. It uses a credit-based system and has partnerships for joint programs with institutions in China, Thailand, and others.

Undergraduate programs include bachelor's in pedagogy (e.g., Mathematics, Physics, History), sciences (e.g., Data Science, Biology, Political Science), engineering (e.g., Information Technology, Civil Engineering, Chemical Engineering), architecture, and veterinary medicine. Master's and doctoral programs cover fields like mathematics, physics, chemistry, history, education management, and more.

Admission benchmarks for 2025 ranged from 19 to 28.4 points, with Pedagogy History having the highest at 28.4.

The university is a member of the CDIO Initiative and an associate member of the ASEAN University Network-Quality Assurance (AUN-QA), with two programs accredited by AUN-QA in 2020-2021.

== Campuses and facilities ==
Vinh University operates across five campuses with modern facilities, ranked among the top in Vietnam. The total planned area is 130 hectares, with 44.12 hectares in use.

- Campus 1 (Main): 182 Lê Duẩn, Vinh, Nghệ An (14 ha) – Administrative offices, classrooms, labs, library, dormitories, sports facilities.
- Campus 2: Vinh Phú and Vinh Lộc wards, Nghệ An (19.2 ha) – Institutes of Engineering, Agriculture, National Defense Education Center, student village.
- Campus 3: Đan Hải Commune, Hà Tĩnh (9.3 ha) – Brackish aquaculture practice center.
- Campus 4: Hưng Nguyên Commune, Nghệ An (1.4 ha) – Freshwater aquaculture practice center.
- Campus 5: Additional research and training bases.

Dormitories accommodate over 4,200 students.

== Rankings ==
- SCImago Institutions Rankings (2025): Top 10 in Vietnam (5,187 globally, 719 in Asia).
- QS Asia University Rankings (2025): 951–1300.
- Webometrics (2022): 18th in Vietnam.
