= Nha Trang University =

Coordinates: 12.2703°N 109.1997°E

- Trường Đại học Nha Trang
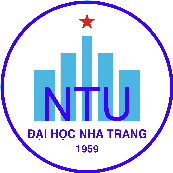
- Former names: Fisheries Faculty of Hanoi Institute of Agriculture and Forestry; School of Fisheries; University of Sea-product Technology; University of Fisheries
- Motto: Luôn tự đổi mới, Hướng tới tương lai
- Motto in English: Always Self-renewal, Towards the Future
- Type: Public
- Established: 1959
- Chairman: Dr. Khong Trung Thang
- President: Assoc. Prof. Dr. Trang Si Trung
- Vice-president: Dr. Quach Hoai Nam; Dr. Tran Doan Hung
- Academic staff: 450 (2021)
- Administrative staff: 250 (2021)
- Students: 17,281 (2021)
- Undergraduates: 16,500 (2021)
- Postgraduates: 781 (2021)
- Doctoral students: 31 (2021)
- Location: 02 Nguyen Đinh Chieu, Nha Trang, Khanh Hoa, Vietnam
- Campus: Urban 20 hectares (49 acres) (Nha Trang campus)
- Website: www.ntu.edu.vn

Nha Trang University is a university in Nha Trang, Khánh Hòa Province, in Vietnam's South Central Coast. It is a multidisciplinary university offering 36 programs for bachelor degrees, 16 programs for master's degrees, and 6 programs for doctoral degrees.

== History ==
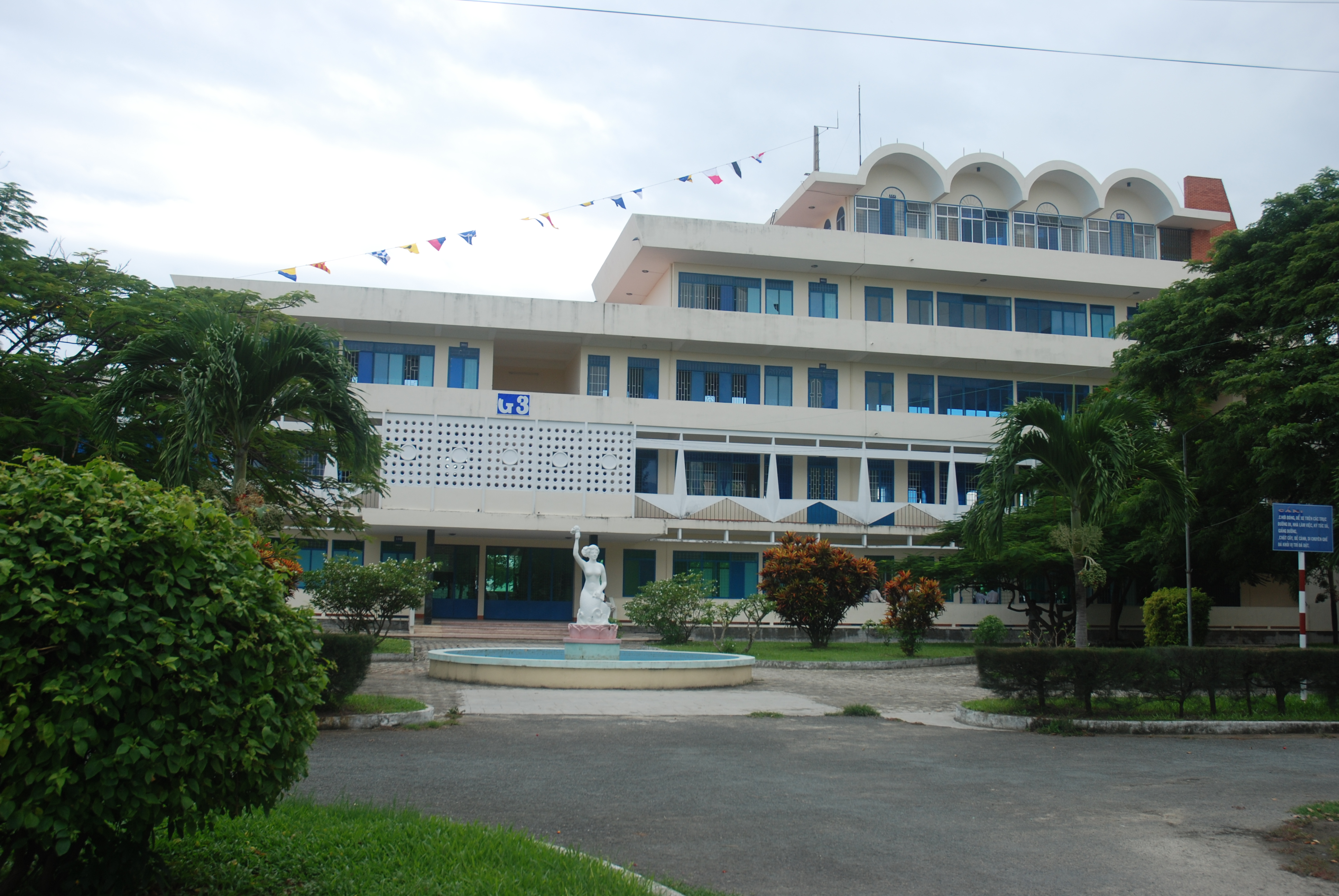
A corner of Nha Trang University campus

== Faculties and Institutes ==
Nha Trang University has the following faculties:

- Faculty of Food Technology
- Faculty of Information Technology
- Faculty of Transportation Engineering
- Faculty of Mechanical Engineering
- Faculty of Electrical & Electronic Engineering
- Faculty of Economics
- Faculty of Civil Engineering
- Faculty of Accounting and Finance
- Faculty of Social Sciences and Humanities
- Faculty of Foreign Languages
- Faculty of Tourism
- Institute for Biotechnology & Environment
- Institute for Aquaculture
- Institute for Marine Science & Fishing Technology
- Institute for Ship Research and Development (UNINSHIP)
- Center for Aquatic Animal Health and Breeding
- Center for Software Technology R & D
- Center for Foreign Languages
- Center for Military and Security Education
