= Thảo Griffiths =

Vietnamese-American activist (born 1978)

Thảo Griffiths (Nguyễn Thị Thu Thảo) was born in 1978 in Ha Giang, Vietnam. From 2007 to 2016 she was Country Director for Vietnam Veterans of America Foundation (VVAF) - an American Non-Governmental Organization which was awarded the Nobel Peace Prize in 1997 with close partnership with the Ministry of Defense of Vietnam on banning landmines.

== Profile ==
She was born in 1978 in a poor family with both parents being teachers. After having graduated from secondary school, she passed the entrance examination and studied at Foreign Language Specialized School (University of Languages and International Studies - Vietnam National University, Hanoi).

She studied at Diplomatic Academy of Vietnam later on but came back to Ha Giang to work as an Assistant to Senior Technical Advisor for United Nations Development Programme in 1999.

In 2002, she received the scholarship for Master of Engineering in Systems Engineering from RMIT University.

She was a Fulbright scholar in 2004 - 2006 with the major of International Relations at American University.

In 2004, she was the Country Manager of VOXIVA Incorporation in Vietnam.

In 2007, she worked as an advisor for Microsoft Corporation about strategic relationship-building and IT-related advocacy in Vietnam.

In 2011, she became the first Vietnamese Rotary Peace Fellow.

In 2013, she was an Eisenhower Fellow.

In 2014, she was one of the first two Vietnamese fellows to participate in the Conversations organized by the Gordon Cook Foundation at the Windsor Castle in England.

In 2016, she joined the Master of Advanced Studies programme by the Geneva Centre for Security Policy (GCSP) and the Global Studies Institute (GSI) of the University of Geneva as a fellow.

== Career and contributions ==
As Country Director for the Vietnam Veterans of America Foundation (VVAF) since 2007, Thao Griffiths has managed programs relating to continuous post-conflict issues including Agent Orange contamination, unexploded ordnances (UXO) and mental health issues.

Thao Griffiths has had several years of work experience in development and humanitarian assistance in post-conflict situations. She works across sectors including NGOs, academia, businesses, and government including extensive work with the US Department of State and Vietnam Ministry of National Defense. In addition, she focuses on explored climate change, the inequality between rich and poor, deforestation, and human rights.

Some organizations she has worked with including IFAD, SIDA, and UNDP with the poverty reduction programs, and Environmental Defense Fund (EDF), US-Vietnam Trade Council, and VVAF. In private sector, she was consultant for Bombardier Inc (Canada), Planned Systems International PSI (USA), VOXIVA Inc. (USA), and Microsoft Asia Pacific.

== Family ==
She has two children with PhD. Patrick Griffiths who lives in Australia.
