= VNU University of Social Sciences and Humanities =

- Trường Đại học Khoa học Xã hội và Nhân văn, Đại học Quốc gia Hà Nội
- Former names: University of Literature, University of Hanoi, College of Social Sciences and Humanities
- Motto: Trân trọng quá khứ, nắm giữ tương lai
- Motto in English: Honoring the Past, Embracing the Future
- Type: Public
- Established: October 10, 1945; 81 years ago
- Parent institution: Vietnam National University, Hanoi
- Rector: Hoàng Anh Tuấn
- Location: Hanoi, Vietnam
- Colors: Red, Yellow, Blue
- Website: ussh.vnu.edu.vn

VNU University of Social Sciences and Humanities (VNU-USSH; Vietnamese: Trường Đại học Khoa học Xã hội và Nhân văn, Đại học Quốc gia Hà Nội), or Hanoi University of Social Sciences and Humanities, is a research university in Hanoi, Vietnam, and a member university of Vietnam National University, Hanoi.

== History ==
In October 1945, President Hồ Chí Minh signed the decree to establish the University of Literature (Ban Đại học Văn khoa, or Trường Đại học Văn khoa) - the precursor of the current VNU-USSH. In April 1956, the University of Hanoi (Trường Đại học Tổng hợp Hà Nội) was established. During this period, fundamental foundation for the disciplines of social sciences and humanities as well as the university's tradition and reputation were laid.

In September 1995, the VNU University of Social Sciences and Humanities (formerly College of Social Sciences and Humanities) was established on the basis of social sciences and humanities from University of Hanoi, and became an official member of Vietnam National University, Hanoi (VNU) - the country's leading comprehensive training and research center.

== Rectors (1995 - present) ==
| No. | Name | Term of office | Speciality |
|---|---|---|---|
| 1 | Phùng Hữu Phú | 1995 - 1999 | Scientific Communism |
| 2 | Phạm Quang Long | 1999 - 2001 | Literature |
| 3 | Phạm Xuân Hằng | 2001 - 2006 | Historical Documents |
| 4 | Nguyễn Văn Khánh | 2006 - 2015 | Vietnam's History |
| 5 | Phạm Quang Minh | 2015 - 2020 | Southeast Asian Studies |
| 6 | Hoàng Anh Tuấn | 2021–present | History |

== Programs ==
=== Undergraduate programs ===
- Anthropology
- Archival Science
- History
- Hotel Management
- International Studies
- Information Studies
- Journalism
- Library Science
- Linguistics
- Literature
- Management Science
- Oriental Studies
- Office Management
- Philosophy
- Political Science
- Psychology
- Religious Studies
- Sino-Nom Studies
- Social Work
- Sociology
- Tourism and Travel Management
- Vietnamese Studies

=== Graduate programs ===
==== Master's Programs ====
- Anthropology
- Archaeology
- Archival Science
- Asian Studies
- Clinical Psychology
- Foreign Literature
- Historiography and Historical Sources
- History of Communist Party of Vietnam
- Ho Chi Minh Studies
- International Relations
- Japan Studies
- Journalism
- Library - Information Science
- Linguistics
- Literary Theories
- Management of Public Action and Enterprises
- Management Science
- Media and Communications Management
- Office Management
- Philosophy
- Political Science
- Psychology
- Psychology for the Development of Infants and Adolescents
- Religious Studies
- Science and Technology Management
- Scientific Socialism
- Sino-Nom Studies
- Social Work
- Sociology
- Theories, History and Criticism of Film and Television
- Tourism
- Vietnam History
- Vietnamese Cultural History
- Vietnamese Folklore
- Vietnamese Literature
- Vietnamese Studies
- World History

==== Doctoral programs ====
- Anthropology
- Archaeology
- Archival Science
- Chinese Studies
- Contrastive and Comparative Linguistics
- Dialectical and Historical Materialism
- Foreign Literature
- History of Communist Party of Vietnam
- Historiography and Historical Sources
- Ho Chi Minh Studies
- International Relations
- Japan Studies
- Journalism
- Library - Information Science
- Linguistics
- Literary Theories
- Political Science
- Psychology
- Religious Studies
- Science and Technology Management
- Scientific Socialism
- Sino-Nom Studies
- Social Work
- Sociology
- Southeast Asian Studies
- Vietnamese Ethnic Minorities’ Linguistics
- Vietnam's History
- Vietnamese Folklore
- Vietnamese Language Studies
- Vietnamese Literature
- World History

== School, faculties and division ==
- School of Journalism and Communication
- Faculty of Anthropology
- Faculty of Archives and Office Management
- Faculty of History
- Faculty of Information and Library Science
- Faculty of International Studies
- Faculty of Linguistics
- Faculty of Literature
- Faculty of Management Science
- Faculty of Oriental Studies
- Faculty of Philosophy
- Faculty of Political Science
- Faculty of Psychology
- Faculty of Sociology
- Faculty of Tourism
- Faculty of Vietnamese Studies and Language
- Division of Religious Studies
- High School for Gifted Students in Social Sciences and Humanities

== Institute, museum and centers ==
- Institute for Policy and Management
- Museum of Anthropology
- Center for applied information Technology and Training
- Center for Arts and Culture Studies and Application
- Center for Asian-Pacific Area Studies and International Relations
- Center for Assisting and Consulting Psychology
- Center for Chinese Studies
- Center for Contemporary Religious Studies
- Center for Education Quality Assurance
- Center for Foreign Languages and Educational Cooperation
- Center for Gender, Population, Environment and Social Affairs
- Center for Information Technology training and application
- Center for Vietnamese Language and Culture
- Hanoi Sejong Center for Korean language
- Research Center for the Development of Minorities in Mountainous Regions and the Red River Basin

== Administrative offices ==
- Office for Academic Affairs
- Office for Cooperation and Development
- Office for General Administration
- Office for Graduate Affairs
- Office for Inspection and Legal Affairs
- Office for Personnel Affairs
- Office for Planning and Finance
- Office for Politics and Student Affairs
- Office for Research Affairs
- Journal of Social Sciences and Humanities

== Notable people ==
For over 70 years, the university has represented the convergence of many notable people. Individuals such as President Hồ Chí Minh, Prime Minister Phạm Văn Đồng, General Võ Nguyên Giáp, scholars including professors Đào Duy Anh, Trần Đức Thảo, Đinh Xuân Lâm, Hà Văn Tấn, Phan Huy Lê, Trần Quốc Vượng and generations of academics who are attributed to have founded and developed the social sciences and humanities in Vietnam, and brought international attention to Vietnam.

VNU-USSH has educated and hosted many prominent modern Vietnamese politicians, including General Secretary - President Nguyễn Phú Trọng and Secretary Phạm Quang Nghị.

In addition, journalist and commentator Trương Anh Ngọc, currently working at the Vietnam News Agency, previously studied at this university.
