= Vietnam University Admission Rankings =

The University Admission Rankings is a national ranking of Vietnamese high schools based on the average grades of the annual university entrance exam. The statistics is published by the Ministry of Education and Training.

== 2012 Ranking ==
| Rank | Province/City | High school | Number of university applicants | Average grade |
|---|---|---|---|---|
| 1 | Ho Chi Minh City | High School for Gifted, Vietnam National University, HCMC(*) | 499 | 21.61 |
| 2 | Hanoi | High School for Gifted Students, Hanoi National University of Education (*) | 426 | 21.50 |
| 3 | Hanoi | Foreign Language Specialized School (*) | 468 | 21.48 |
| 4 | Da Nang | Lê Quý Đôn High School for the Gifted | 344 | 21.42 |
| 5 | Bình Định Province | Lê Quý Đôn Gifted High School | 383 | 21.22 |
| 6 | Nam Định | Le Hong Phong High School | 707 | 21.15 |
| 7 | Nghệ An Province | Phan Boi Chau Gifted High School | 516 | 21.08 |
| 8 | Vĩnh Phúc Province | Vĩnh Phúc Gifted High School | 468 | 21.05 |
| 9 | Hanoi | High School for the Gifted Students, Vietnam National University, Hanoi(*) | 468 | 20.96 |
| 10 | Hà Tĩnh | Hà Tĩnh Gifted High School | 309 | 20.79 |
| 11 | Hanoi | Hanoi – Amsterdam High School | 508 | 20.75 |
| 12 | Ho Chi Minh City | Le Hong Phong High School | 1026 | 20.67 |
| 13 | Bình Phước Province | Quang Trung Gifted High School | 285 | 20.62 |
| 14 | Bắc Ninh | Bắc Ninh Gifted High School | 332 | 20.36 |
| 15 | Hải Dương | Nguyễn Trãi Gifted High School | 471 | 20.13 |
| 16 | Thái Bình | Thái Bình Gifted High School | 497 | 20.06 |
| 17 | Ho Chi Minh City | Tran Dai Nghia High School | 488 | 20.03 |
| 18 | Thanh Hóa | Lam Son High School | 424 | 19.91 |
| 19 | Hai Phong | Tran Phu Gifted High School | 713 | 19.86 |
| 20 | Khánh Hòa Province | Le Qui Don Gifted High School | 299 | 19.76 |
| 21 | Đồng Nai | Luong The Vinh Gifted High School | 497 | 19.63 |
| 22 | Hưng Yên Province | Hưng Yên Gifted High School | 484 | 19.60 |
| 23 | Thừa Thiên–Huế Province | Quoc Hoc – Hue High School for the Gifted | 1058 | 19.56 |
| 24 | Phú Yên Province | Luong Van Chanh High School For The Gifted | 713 | 19.86 |
| 25 | Hà Nam Province | Bien Hoa Gifted High School | 359 | 19.42 |
| 26 | Phú Thọ Province | Hung Vuong Gifted High School | 596 | 19.25 |
| 27 | Long An Province | Long An Gifted High School | 316 | 19.20 |
| 28 | Bà Rịa–Vũng Tàu province | Le Quy Don High School for the Gifted | 346 | 19.07 |
| 29 | Hanoi | Nguyễn Huệ Gifted High School | 838 | 19.05 |
| 30 | Ho Chi Minh City | Nguyen Thuong Hien High School | 1202 | 19.03 |

(*) denotes a national public magnet high school.

== 2011 Ranking ==
| Rank | Province/City | High school | Number of university applicants | Average grade |
|---|---|---|---|---|
| 1 | Bình Phước Province | Quang Trung Gifted High School | 281 | 21.72 |
| 2 | Hanoi | High School for Gifted Students, Hanoi University of Science(*) | 538 | 21.71 |
| 3 | Hà Tĩnh Province | Hà Tĩnh Gifted High School | 308 | 21.37 |
| 4 | Hanoi | High School for Gifted Students, Hanoi National University of Education(*) | 393 | 21.18 |
| 5 | Vĩnh Phúc Province | Vĩnh Phúc Gifted High School | 314 | 21.12 |
| 6 | Bắc Ninh Province | Bắc Ninh Gifted High School | 707 | 20.96 |
| 7 | Thái Bình Province | Thái Bình Gifted High School | 458 | 20.75 |
| 8 | Ho Chi Minh City | High School for the Gifted | 418 | 20.51 |
| 9 | Thanh Hóa | Lam Son High School | 400 | 20.22 |
| 10 | Ho Chi Minh City | Le Hong Phong High School | 881 | 20.21 |
| 11 | Hưng Yên Province | Hưng Yên Gifted High School | 405 | 20.13 |
| 12 | Nam Định Province | Le Hong Phong High School | 752 | 20.12 |
| 13 | Nghệ An Province | Phan Boi Chau Gifted High School | 489 | 20.09 |
| 14 | Da Nang | Lê Quý Đôn Gifted High School | 380 | 19.87 |
| 15 | Hải Dương | Nguyễn Trãi Gifted High School | 461 | 19.81 |
| 16 | Hanoi | Foreign Language Specialized School (*) | 370 | 19.80 |
| 17 | Hanoi | Hanoi – Amsterdam High School | 624 | 19.71 |
| 18 | Khánh Hòa Province | Le Qui Don Gifted High School | 218 | 19.65 |
| 19 | Hà Nam Province | Bien Hoa Gifted High School | 360 | 19.59 |
| 20 | Bắc Giang Province | Bắc Giang Gifted High School | 364 | 19.48 |
| 21 | Long An | Long An Gifted High School | 161 | 19.43 |
| 22 | Hai Phong | Tran Phu Gifted High School | 715 | 19.25 |
| 23 | Quảng Ninh Province | Hạ Long Gifted High School | 373 | 19.16 |
| 24 | Đồng Nai Province | Luong The Vinh Gifted High School | 504 | 18.94 |
| 25 | Bình Định Province | Lê Quý Đôn Gifted High School | 534 | 18.93 |
| 26 | Phú Thọ Province | Hung Vuong Gifted High School | 655 | 18.83 |
| 27 | Đắk Lắk Province | Nguyễn Du Gifted High School | 621 | 18.62 |
| 28 | Ho Chi Minh City | Nguyen Khuyen High School | 3,254 | 18.43 |
| 29 | Ho Chi Minh City | Tran Dai Nghia High School | 491 | 18.42 |
| 30 | Thừa Thiên–Huế Province | Quoc Hoc – Hue High School for the Gifted | 1,016 | 18.38 |

(*) denotes a national public magnet high school.
