= Vietnam National University, Hanoi =

Research university in Hanoi, Vietnam

- Đại học Quốc gia Hà Nội
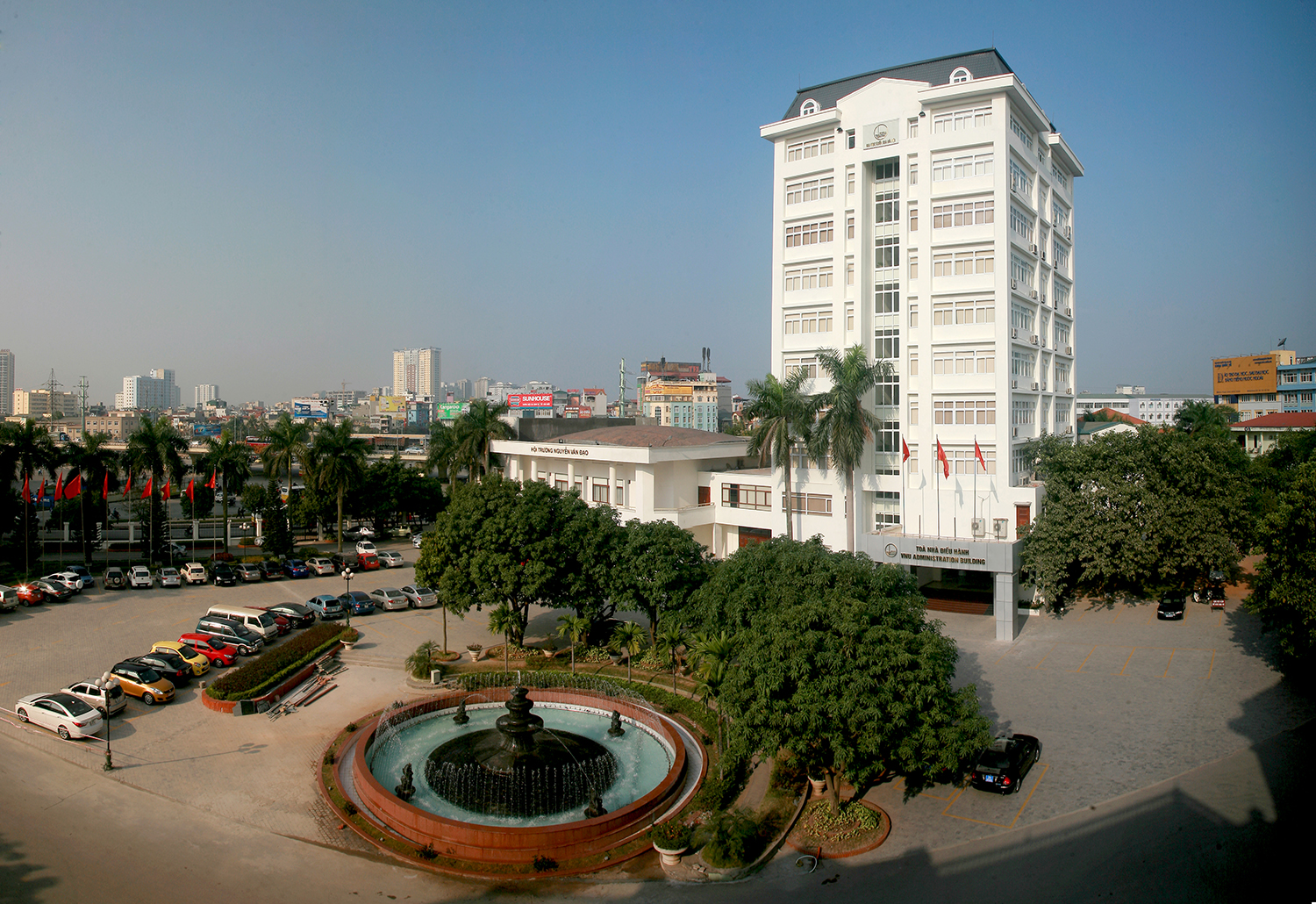
- Administration building
- Former names: University of Indochina (1906–1945); Vietnam National University College, University of Indochina (1945–1956); University of Hanoi (1956–1993)
- Motto: Ab uno disce omnes
- Motto in English: Excellence through Knowledge
- Type: Public; state-owned University
- Established: 16 May 1906; 120 years ago
- Academic affiliations: AUN, AUF, SATU
- President: Hoang Minh Son
- Faculty: 2,220 (2022)
- Administrative staff: 2,443 (2022)
- Students: 49,948 (2022)
- Undergraduates: 45,224 (2022)
- Postgraduates: 8,250 (2021)
- Location: Hanoi, Vietnam; 21°02′25″N 105°46′54″E
- Campus: Urban Suburban
- Colors: Pale green
- Website: en.vnu.edu.vn

University rankings

Global – Overall
- QS World: 761-770 (2026)
- THE World: 1201-1500 (2026)

Global – Business and economics
- THE Business and Economics: 601-800 (2026)

Global – Liberal arts
- QS Social Sciences and Management: 353 (2026)
- THE Social Sciences: 801-1000 (2026)

Global – Life sciences and medicine
- THE Life Sciences: 1001+ (2026)

Global – Science and engineering
- QS Chemistry: 601-700 (2026)
- QS Engineering & Tech.: 401-450 (2026)
- QS Natural Sciences: 451-500 (2026)
- THE Computer Science: 1001+ (2026)
- THE Engineering: 1001-1250 (2026)
- THE Physical Sciences: 1001-1250 (2026)

Regional – Overall
- QS Asia: 158 (2026)
- THE Asia: 501-600 (2025)

Vietnam National University, Hanoi (VNU; Vietnamese: Đại học Quốc gia Hà Nội, lit. 'Hanoi National University') is a public research university system in Hanoi, Vietnam. It has 12 member universities and schools. VNU is one of two Vietnam's national universities, the other one being Vietnam National University, Ho Chi Minh City.

VNU was ranked 158th in Asia by the QS University Rankings 2026. For some consecutive years, it has maintained the No.1 position in Viet Nam’s only domestic university ranking system, the Vietnam’s University Rankings (VNUR).

The President of Vietnam National University, Hanoi is appointed and dismissed by the Prime Minister of Vietnam. The position belongs to the first-tier leadership group under the management of the Central Secretariat of the Communist Party of Vietnam, and is institutionally equivalent to the rank of Vice Minister of ministries and ministerial-level agencies.

== History ==
Throughout its history, the university has had several name changes: the University of Indochina (Université Indochinoise, 東洋大學 or Đại học Đông Dương; established in 1906), Vietnam National University (Trường Đại học Quốc gia Việt Nam; November 1945), and the University of Hanoi (Trường Đại học Tổng hợp Hà Nội; June 1956). In 1993, Vietnam National University, Hanoi (Đại học Quốc gia Hà Nội) was created by merging the University of Hanoi, Hanoi National University of Education (HNUE) and College of Foreign Languages.

This university was home to the country's first business school.

The institution owns four high schools - three of which are for gifted students in foreign languages (Foreign Language Specialized School), natural science (High School for Gifted Students, Hanoi University of Science), social science (High School for Gifted Students in Social Sciences and Humanities), and the fourth school (High School of Educational Sciences) applies advanced educational technology in teaching; and a middle school (ULIS Middle School).

== Campus ==
=== Location ===
Vietnam National University, Hanoi (VNU) has 7 campuses across 7 districts of Hanoi, namely:

1. Cầu Giấy campus
2. Hoàn Kiếm campus
3. Thanh Xuân campus
4. Hai Bà Trưng campus
5. Hòa Lạc campus, Thạch Thất district (current headquarters)
6. Nam Từ Liêm campus
7. Ba Vì campus

== Board of directors ==
- President: Bùi Thế Duy
- Vice President: Nguyễn Hoàng Hải
- Vice President: Phạm Bảo Sơn
- Vice President: Nguyễn Hiệu
- Vice President: Đào Thanh Trường

== Member institutions ==
Vietnam National University, Hanoi includes the following members (universities, schools):

- VNU University of Science (VNU-HUS)
  - High School for Gifted Students, Hanoi University of Science (HSGS)
- VNU University of Social Sciences and Humanities (VNU-USSH)
  - High School for Gifted Students, VNU University of Social Sciences and Humanities(HSSH)
- VNU University of Languages and International Studies (VNU-ULIS)
  - ULIS Middle School
  - Foreign Language Specialized School (FLSS)
- VNU University of Engineering and Technology (VNU-UET)
- VNU University of Economics and Business (VNU-UEB)
- VNU University of Education (VNU-UEd)
  - High school of Education Sciences (HES)
- VNU University of Medicine and Pharmacy (VNU-UMP)
- VNU Vietnam Japan University (VNU-VJU)
- VNU University of Law (VNU-UL)
- VNU School of Business and Management (VNU-HSB)
- VNU International School (VNU-IS)
- VNU School of Interdisciplinary Sciences and Arts (VNU-SIS)

== Alumni ==
=== Politicians ===
- Nguyễn Phú Trọng (General Secretary of the CPV 2011-2024)
- Võ Nguyên Giáp (PAV General, Minister of Defence 1948-1980)
- Trường Chinh (Chairman of the National Assembly of Vietnam 1960-1981, later Chairman of the Council of State of Vietnam 1981-1987)
- Lê Minh Hưng (Prime Minister of Vietnam)
- Trương Thị Mai (Head of the Central Organization Commission of the CPV 2021-2024)
- Phạm Quang Nghị (Secretary of the Party Committee in Ha Noi city 2011-2016)
- Tô Huy Rứa (Head of the Organizing Commission of the CPV 2011-2016)
- Lê Quốc Minh (current Editor-in-chief of Nhân Dân)
- Ngô Xuân Lịch (former Minister of Defence)
- Nguyễn Kim Sơn (former Minister of Education and Training)
- Phùng Xuân Nhạ (former Minister of Education and Training)
- Đinh Tiến Dũng (former Minister of Finance)
- Mai Tiến Dũng (former Minister, Chairman of the Office of the Government)
- Nguyễn Thị Thanh (Vice Chairman of National Assembly of Vietnam)
- Nguyễn Xuân Thắng (Director of Ho Chi Minh National Academy of Politics)
- Nguyễn Quang Thuấn (Chairman of Vietnam Academy of Social Sciences)
- Nguyễn Văn Hiệu (Chairman of Vietnam Academy of Science and Technology)

=== Other fields ===
- Ngô Bảo Châu (the first Vietnamese mathematician to have received the Fields Medal)
- Hà Văn Tấn (historian, archaeologist, and scholar of Buddhism)
- Đinh Xuân Lâm (historian)
- Lại Văn Sâm (journalist)
- Phan Huy Lê (professor of history)
- Trần Quốc Vượng (historian, archaeologist, and culturologist)
- Hà Đình Đức (biologist)
- Hoàng Thị Ý Nhi (poet)
- Đàm Thanh Sơn (theoretical physicist)
- Hoàng Tụy (applied mathematician, one of two founders of the mathematical institutions of Vietnam, the "father of global optimization")
- Trần Quang Đức (art historian, calligrapher, author, and translator)
- Đào Duy Anh (historian and lexicographer)
- Bùi Bích Phương (Miss Vietnam in 1988)
- Thanh Thảo (poet and journalist)
- Vũ Hà Văn (mathematician and the Percey F. Smith Professor of Mathematics at Yale University)
- Phạm Xuân Nguyên (writer and literary translator)
- Trần Lập (rock musician)
- Hieu Minh Ngo (a Vietnamese cyber security specialist and a former hacker and identity thief)
- Bảo Ninh (Vietnamese novelist)

== Awards ==
President of Vietnam awarded for Vietnam National University, Hanoi:

- Gold Star Order title in 2006
- 3 Order of Ho Chi Minh
- 5 Hero of Labor (Vietnam)
- 27 Independence Order
- 5 Labor Order
