= Trần Quốc Vượng =

Trần Quốc Vượng may refer to:

- Trần Quốc Vượng (historian)
- Trần Quốc Vượng (politician)
