= VNU University of Medicine and Pharmacy =

Public university in Hanoi, Vietnam

- Trường Đại học Y Dược, Đại học Quốc gia Hà Nội
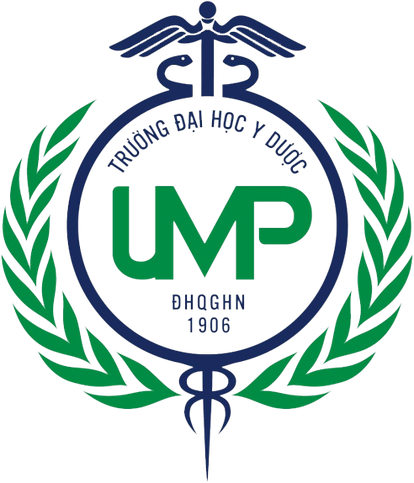
- Global Symbol of VNU University of Medicine and Pharmacy

Location
- Y1, 2B Phạm Văn Đồng, Dịch Vọng Hậu, Cầu Giấy; Hanoi; Vietnam
- Coordinates: 21°02′25″N 105°46′54″E

Information
- Former name: School of Medicine and Pharmacy, Vietnam National University, Hanoi (2010-2020)
- Type: Public Medical University
- Motto: Cùng kiến tạo cơ hội và chia sẻ thành quả (Creating opportunities and share results together)
- Established: May 2010; 15 years ago
- Principal: Prof. MD. PhD. Le Ngoc Thanh
- Staff: 86 (2023)
- Faculty: 260 (2023)
- Enrollment: 640 students / year
- Language: Vietnamese, English
- Colors: Light Green; White; Dark Blue
- Newspaper: VNU Journal of Science: Medical and Pharmaceutical Sciences
- Website: ump.vnu.edu.vn

VNU University of Medicine and Pharmacy (VNU-UMP; Vietnamese: Trường Đại học Y Dược, Đại học Quốc gia Hà Nội) is a university specializing in medicine and pharmacy in Vietnam, a member of Vietnam National University, Hanoi.

== History ==
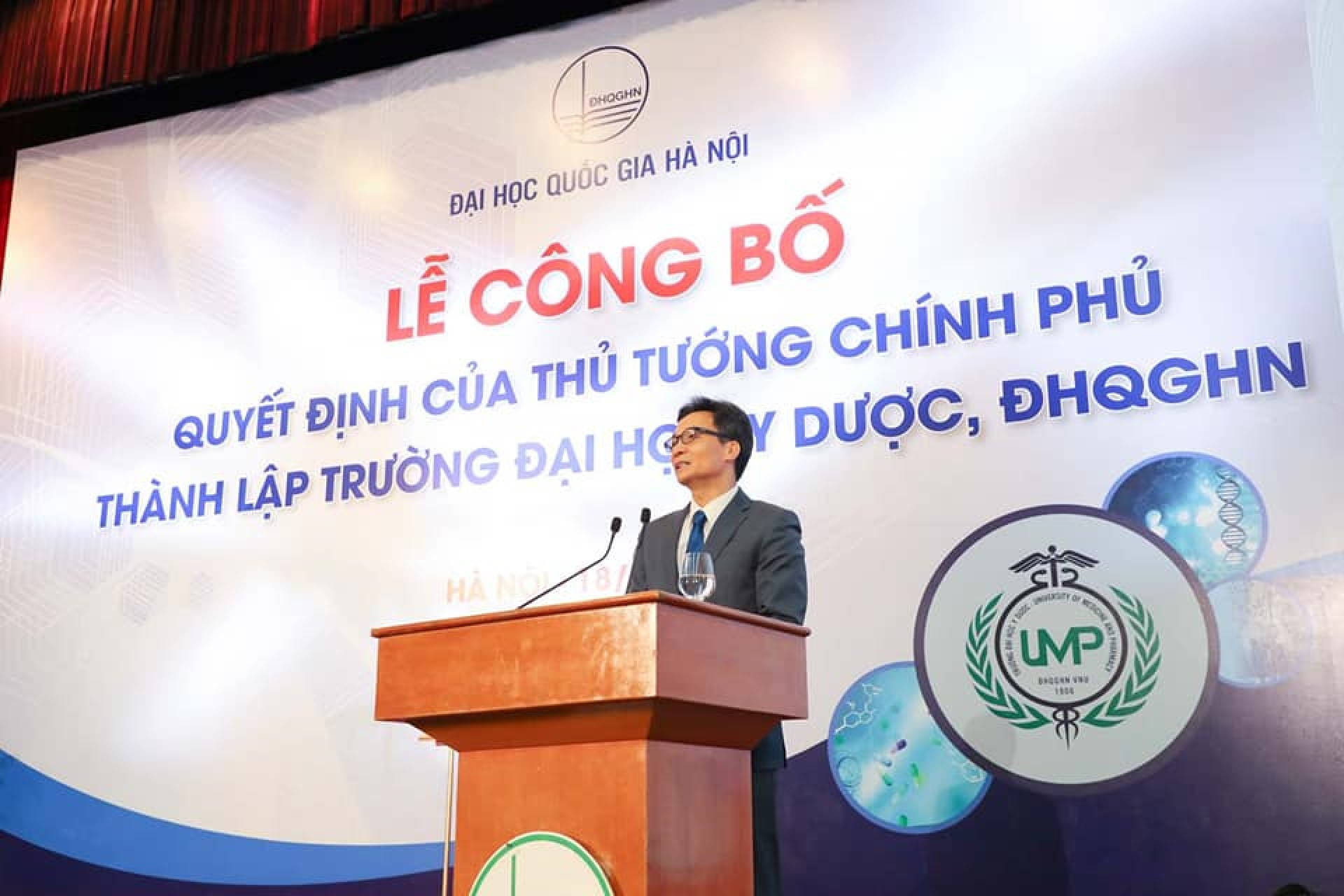
Former Deputy Prime Minister Vu Duc Dam at the founding ceremony of University of Medicine and Pharmacy, November 18, 2020.

On May 20, 2010, Prof. PhD. Mai Trong Nhuan (Former Director of VNU-HN) signed Decision to establish the School of Medicine and Pharmacy - Vietnam National University - Hanoi.

In 2012, VNU organized admission to training two majors: General Medicine and Pharmacy.

On October 27, 2020, the University of Medicine and Pharmacy was established by the Prime Minister on the basis of inheriting the School of Medicine and Pharmacy, approved by the Director of the Vietnam National University, Hanoi.

On December 23, 2022, University of Medicine and Pharmacy - Vietnam National University, Hanoi held a ceremony to announce the decision to establish the Faculty of Odonto-Stomatology.

On May 24, 2023, the University of Medicine and Pharmacy Vietnam National University - Hanoi held a ceremony to announce the decision to establish the Faculty of Pharmacy.

On November 20, 2023, the University of Medicine and Pharmacy Vietnam National University - Hanoi held a ceremony to announce the decision to establish the Faculty of Medicine.

== Facility ==
- Xuân Thủy

Dịch Vọng Hậu, Cầu Giấy, Hanoi, Vietnam.

- Hòa Lạc

Thạch Hòa, Thạch Thất, Hanoi, Vietnam.

- Medical and Pharmaceutical University Hospital

Thanh Xuân Bắc, Thanh Xuân, Hanoi, Vietnam .
Hoàng Liệt, Hoàng Mai, Hanoi, Vietnam .

== Medical & Graduate education ==
=== Undergraduate programs (06) ===
- Medicine.
- Odonto-stomatology.
- Nursing.
- Pharmacy
- Medical laboratory Technique.
- Medical Imaging Technique.

=== PhD degree programs (10) ===
- Pediatrics.
- Ophthalmology.
- Odonto-stomatology.
- Surgery.
- Anesthesiology.
- Otorhinolaryngology.
- Internal medicine.(Choose 1 of 3 majors: Internal Medicine, Sports Medicine, Stroke & Cerebrovascular Disease)
- Obstetrics and gynaecology.
- Oncology.
- Radiology and Nuclear medicine.

=== Residency programs (13) ===
- Oncology.
- Surgery.
- Diagnostic Medical Imaging.
- Ophthalmology.
- Internal medicine.
- Obstetrics and gynaecology.
- Pediatrics.
- Otorhinolaryngology.
- Anesthesiology.
- Plastic surgery.
- Infectious diseases.
- Emergency medicine.
- Odonto-stomatology.

== Affiliated faculties (03) ==
- Faculty of Odonto - Stomatology (09 teaching departments, 01 dental clinics, 01 management department)
- Faculty of Pharmacy (08 teaching department)
- Faculty of Medicine (41 teaching departments, 01 management department)

== Affiliated teaching hospitals and research institutes ==
Besides the Medical and Pharmaceutical University Hospital - Vietnam National University, Hanoi; VNU University of Medicine and Pharmacy also relies on affiliated teaching hospitals for clinical education. Medical students primarily complete their clinical experiences at the following hospitals. Clinical faculty at VNU University of Medicine and Pharmacy generally hold a concurrent appointment as a physician or a surgeon at one of the affiliated hospitals.

- Bach Mai Hospital
- Vietnam – Germany Hospital
- National Hospital of Obstetrics and Gynecology
- Hanoi Obstetrics and Gynecology Hospital
- Vietnam National Hospital of Pediatrics
- National Hospital of Odonto-Stomatology, Hanoi
- National Otorhinorarynology Hospital of Vietnam
- Vietnam National Eye Hospital
- E Hospital
- Vietnam National Lung Hospital
- Vietnam National Cancer Hospital
- Hanoi Heart Hospital
- Vietnam National Hospital of Dermatology and Venereology
- National Hospital of Endocrinology, Hanoi
- Vietnam National Hospital of Tropical Diseases
- Vietnam National Psychiatric Hospital No.1
- Vietnam National Hospital of Traditional Medicine
- Vietnam National Institute of Drug Quality Control
- Vietnam National Institute of Hematology and Blood Transfusion
- Central Military Hospital 108
- Vietnam – Cuba Hospital
- Ha Dong General Hospital
- Saint Paul Hospital (Hanoi)
- Vietnam Sport Hospital
- Vietnam National Institute of Medicinal Materials
- Vietnam National Institute of Forensic Medicine
- VNU Center for Educational Testing
- Soc Son District Health Center

== See also ==
- Vietnam National University, Hanoi
- Vietnam National University, Ho Chi Minh City
- Hanoi Medical University
- Ho Chi Minh City Medicine and Pharmacy University

== Sources ==
- News and magazines
