= High School for Gifted Students in Social Sciences and Humanities =

High school in Hanoi, Vietnam

Coordinates: 20.9954°N 105.8071°E

- Trường Trung học phổ thông chuyên Khoa học Xã hội và Nhân văn

Location
- 336 Nguyễn Trãi St. Hanoi; Vietnam

Information
- Type: Public
- Established: 9 October 2019
- School district: Thanh Xuân
- Principal: Assoc. Prof Dr. Nguyễn Quang Liệu
- Grades: 10-12
- Website: hssh.ussh.vnu.edu.vn

High School for Gifted Students in Social Sciences and Humanities (Vietnamese: Trường Trung học phổ thông chuyên Khoa học Xã hội và Nhân văn), is a public high school for gifted students located in Hanoi.

== History ==
On 9 October 2019, the People's Council of Hanoi City issued a decision to establish High School for Gifted Students in Social Sciences and Humanities under University of Social Sciences and Humanities, VNU.

Since the 2020/2021 school year, the school has been enrolling students for literature, history and geography major classes.

== Admission and class systems ==
=== Admission ===
Before being admitted to the school, all applicants are required to do an entrance exam which includes mathematics, English, literature (normal) and one of the three offered major subjects (literature, history and geography).

Normally, mathematics and English are multiple choice exams, while literature and the chosen major subjects are usually essay exams.

To be allowed to do the entrance exam, applicants must:

- Have graduated from middle school.
- Have a satisfiable academic performance and conduct in their middle school overall report.

From the 2024/2025, High School for Gifted Students in Social Sciences and Humanities stopped offering classes of the high-quality system due to a circular enacted by the Ministry of Education and Training which prohibits gifted high schools from offering such classes.

=== Class systems ===
The school has two academic systems:

- Gifted system (Note: For students who passed all subjects in the entrance exam.)
  - Literature major classes
  - History major classes
  - Geography major classes
- High-quality system (Note: For students who failed the exam for their chosen major subject but still have a high score on their Maths, Literature and English exams; discontinued since 2024.)

== Faculty ==
=== School administrators ===
Principal: Assoc. Prof Dr. Nguyễn Quang Liệu
Vice Principal: Dr. Diêu Thị Lan Phương
