= VNU University of Economics and Business =

- Trường Đại học Kinh tế, Đại học Quốc gia Hà Nội
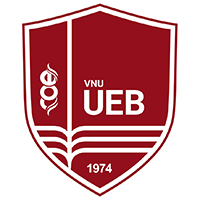
- Former names: University of Economics and Business
- Motto: Đường tới thành công
- Motto in English: "The Road to Success"
- Type: Public
- Parent institution: Vietnam National University, Hanoi
- Chairman: Nguyen Truc Le
- Rector: Le Trung Thanh

VNU University of Economics and Business (VNU-UEB; Vietnamese: Trường Đại học Kinh tế, Đại học Quốc gia Hà Nội), or University of Economics and Business, is a member of Vietnam National University, Hanoi. The university was established under Decision 290/QD-TTg of the Prime Minister on 6 March 2007. However, its historical origin dates back to 1974 with the establishment of the Political Economy Department at the Vietnam National University, Hanoi. The college then underwent several transformations before becoming the University of Economics and Business in 2007.

== History ==
November 1974: Faculty of Political Economy - Vietnam National University, Hanoi.

September 1995: Department of Economy - University of Social Science and Humanities - Vietnam National University, Hanoi.

July 1999: School of Economics - Vietnam National University, Hanoi.

March 2007: University of Economics and Business - Vietnam National University, Hanoi.

== Training programs ==
UEB offers a wide range of studies and applied research with majors in Economics and Business Administration.

1. Undergraduate programs:

- Full-time: International Economics, Business Administration, Banking and Finance, Development Economics, Economics and Accounting .
- Training program for outstanding students: Economics, International economics, Business Administration, Banking and Finance, Development Economics, Accounting
- International training program: Business Administration.
- Part-time: International Economics,

2. Postgraduate programs:

- Master's degree: International Economics, Business Administration, Banking and Finance, Political Economy, Accounting, Economic Management, Public Policy and Development, Management of Financial Organizations.
- Doctorate degree: International Economics, Business Administration, Political Economy, Banking and Finance, Economic Management.

3. Joint international programs:

- Bachelor of Business Administration (with Troy University, US).
- Master of Business Administration (with Troy University and North Central University, US).
- Master in Economic Expertise and Management of International Projects (with Paris 12 University, France).
- Doctorate in Business Administration (with North Central U., US).
- Doctorate in Economics and Business Administration (with Massey University, New Zealand).

== Affiliated faculties and institutions (06) ==
- Faculty of Political Economics
- Faculty of Financial Banking
- Faculty of Accounting and Audit
- School of Business Administration
- Faculty of International Economics and Business
- Faculty of Development
