= Quốc Học – Huế High School for the Gifted =

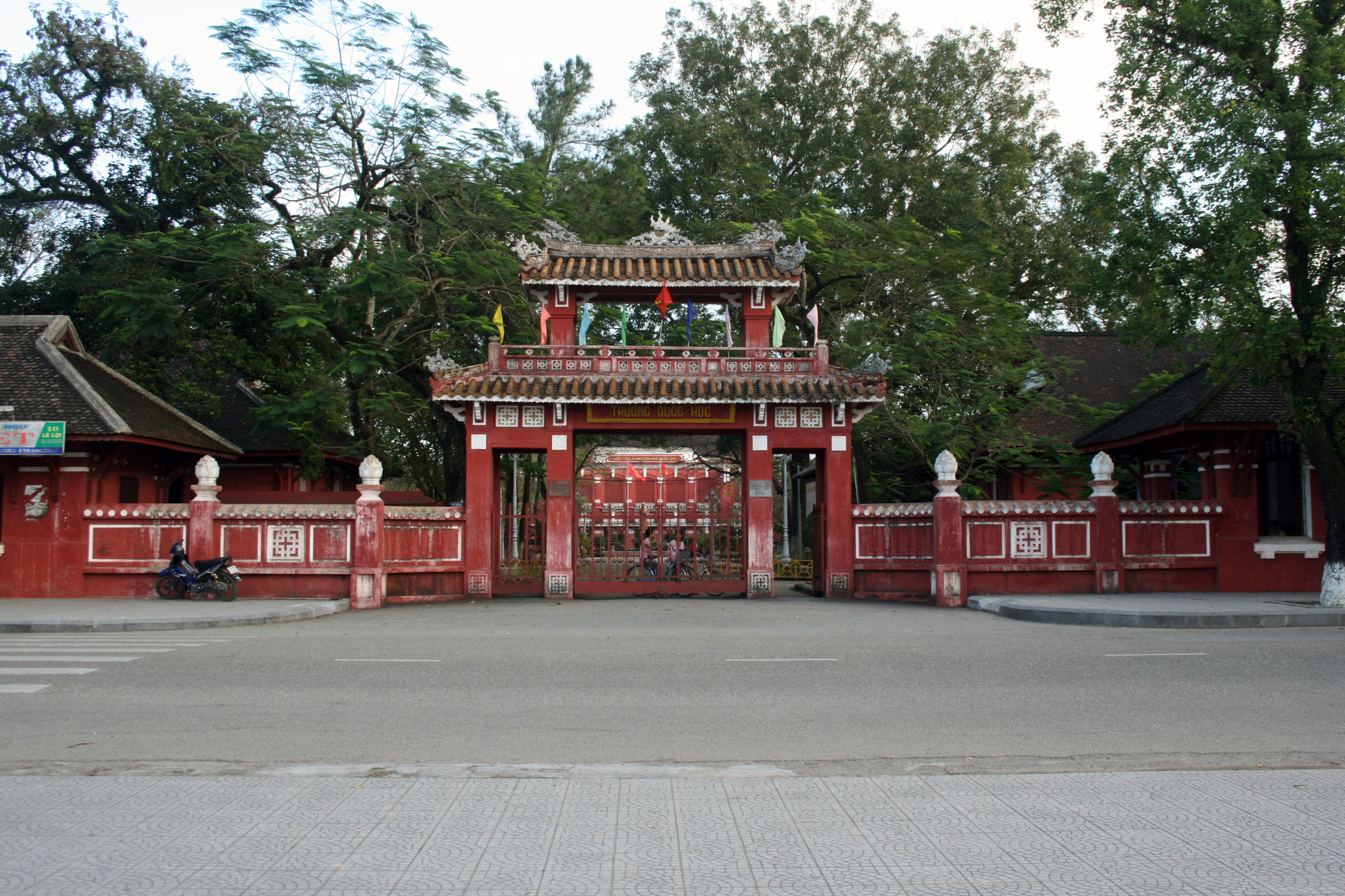
- Quốc Học – Huế High School gate

Location
- 12 Lê Lợi Street; Huế; Vietnam

Information
- Type: Public, Magnet school
- Motto: Hiền tài là nguyên khí quốc gia (Talents and Virtues are the nation's sap)
- Established: 1896
- Principal: Nguyen Phu Tho
- Faculty: 150
- Grades: (10-12)
- Enrollment: approx. 1400

Quốc Học – Huế High School for the Gifted or simply "the Quốc Học of Huế" is a national magnet and gifted high school in Huế, Vietnam. Founded on October 23, 1896, Quốc Học - Huế is the third oldest high school in Vietnam. The school is recognized for its strong academic results, students' qualities and staffs' levels. For a long time, Quốc Học – Huế has always been ranked in the top three high schools in the nation in terms of the quality of education. Other schools include Chu Van An High School in Hanoi and Lê Hồng Phong High School in Ho Chi Minh City. The school is also famous for the notable political leaders who graduated from it, and Ho Chi Minh who was dismissed from it in 1908 for revolutionary activities.

Quốc Học – Huế ranked first nationally in the 2012 Vietnam university admission ranking.

Many school graduates have got admitted to prestigious universities and colleges in the world, including: MIT, National University of Singapore, Nanyang Technological University, University of Cambridge, KAIST, The University Of Chicago, etc.

== History ==
On 17 September 1896 (the 8th year of Thành Thái reign), Quốc Học – Huế High school was established in conformation to the royal verdict and the verdict of the French Resident-Superior in Indochina on 18 November 1896. The school was constructed on the place of a previous squadron headquarters – a royal navy headquarters (1806 or the 5th year of Gia Long's reign).

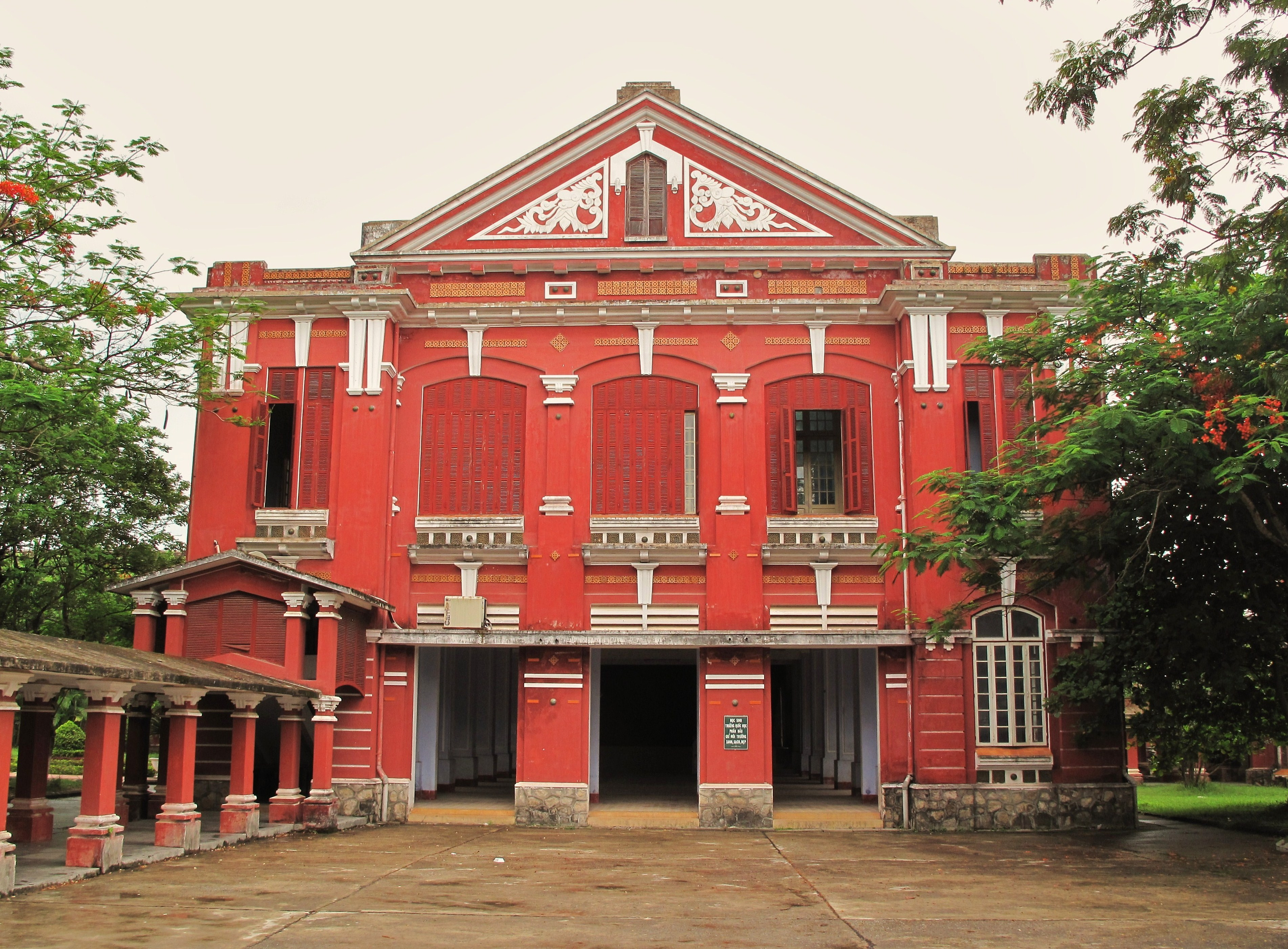
Quốc Học main building.

Quốc Học – Huế High school was established to coach the students, who would serve the feudal colonial government, and the study curriculum then was harmonized with the purpose, French was the main subject. The acceptable students by Quốc Học High School are: the sons of the relatives of the Emperor, the sons of royal families, the sons of mandarins, the students of Thanh Nhon school and Quoc Tu Giam school.

In 1915, Quốc Học – Huế was reconstructed. The rows of thatch roofed apartments were torn down and restored by two rows of buildings, the walls made of brick, and the roof covered with tiles. According to the western European architecture, the construction was solid, and comfortable. Most of the architecture in the school still exist.

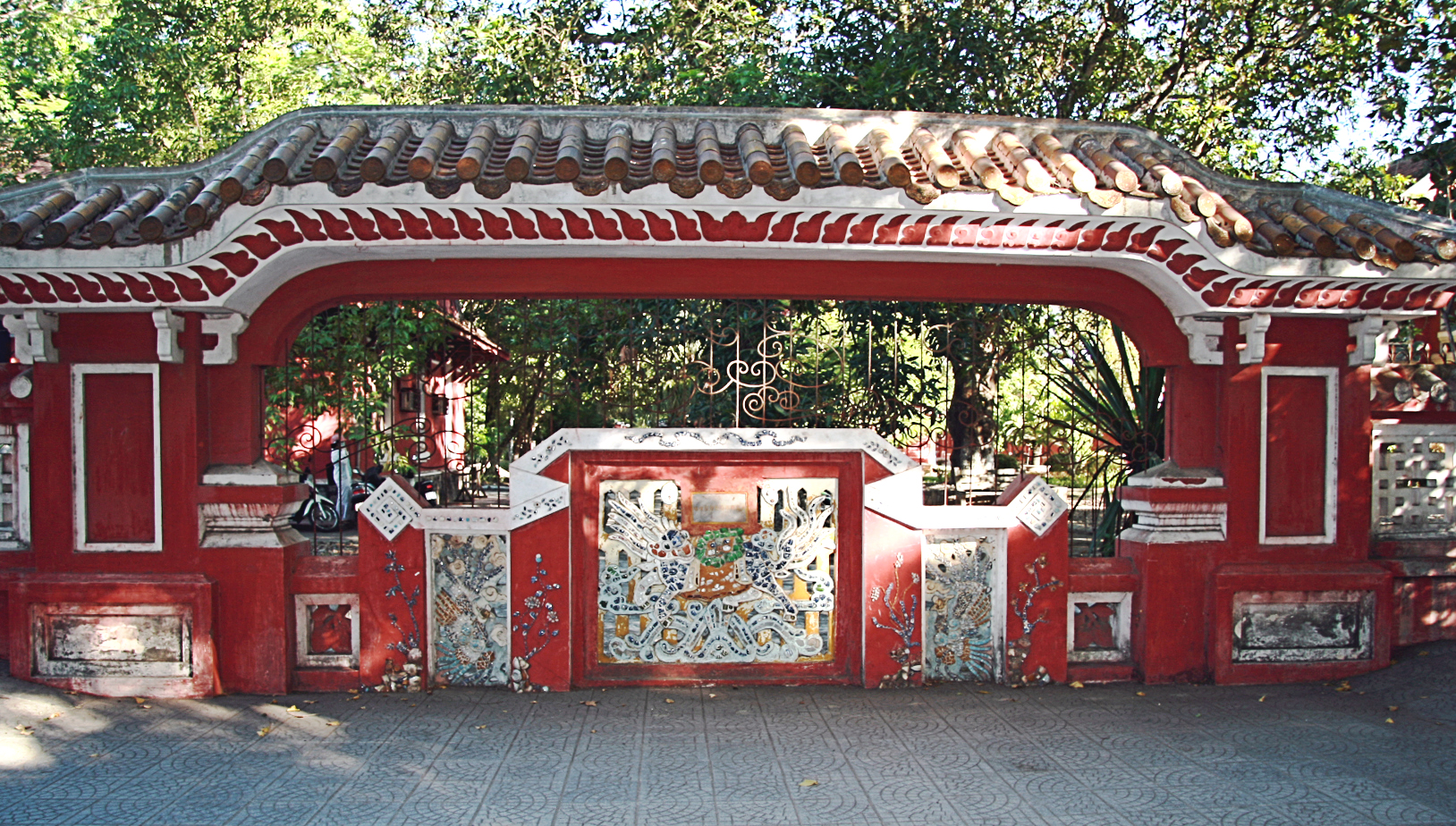
A Trấn phong shaped like a Longma on the school campus.

In 1932, Quốc Học – Huế opened many specialized classes and became known as Khải Định Lycee. On 19 December 1946, during the confrontation against French Colonialists, the school was moved into two places: One branch called "Binh Tri Thien School" was located in Huong Khe, Hà Tĩnh province and the other branch called "Huynh Thuc Khang School", was located in Đức Thọ, Hà Tĩnh Province. The branch came back to Huế after ten years of disruption, and was conquered by French Colonialists as a barrack on April 29, 1955. Later Quốc Học - Huế was reinstated and restarted its normal operation.

Since the academic year of 1994-95, Quốc Học has been designated as one of the three National High School of high proficiency declared by the Prime Minister (the other two schools are Lê Hồng Phong High School of Ho Chi Minh City and Chu Van An High School of Hanoi).

In 2009, Quốc Học – Huế High School was officially renamed as Quốc Học – Huế High School for the Gifted, which made it become the first and the only Gifted High School of Thừa Thiên–Huế Province.

== School campus ==
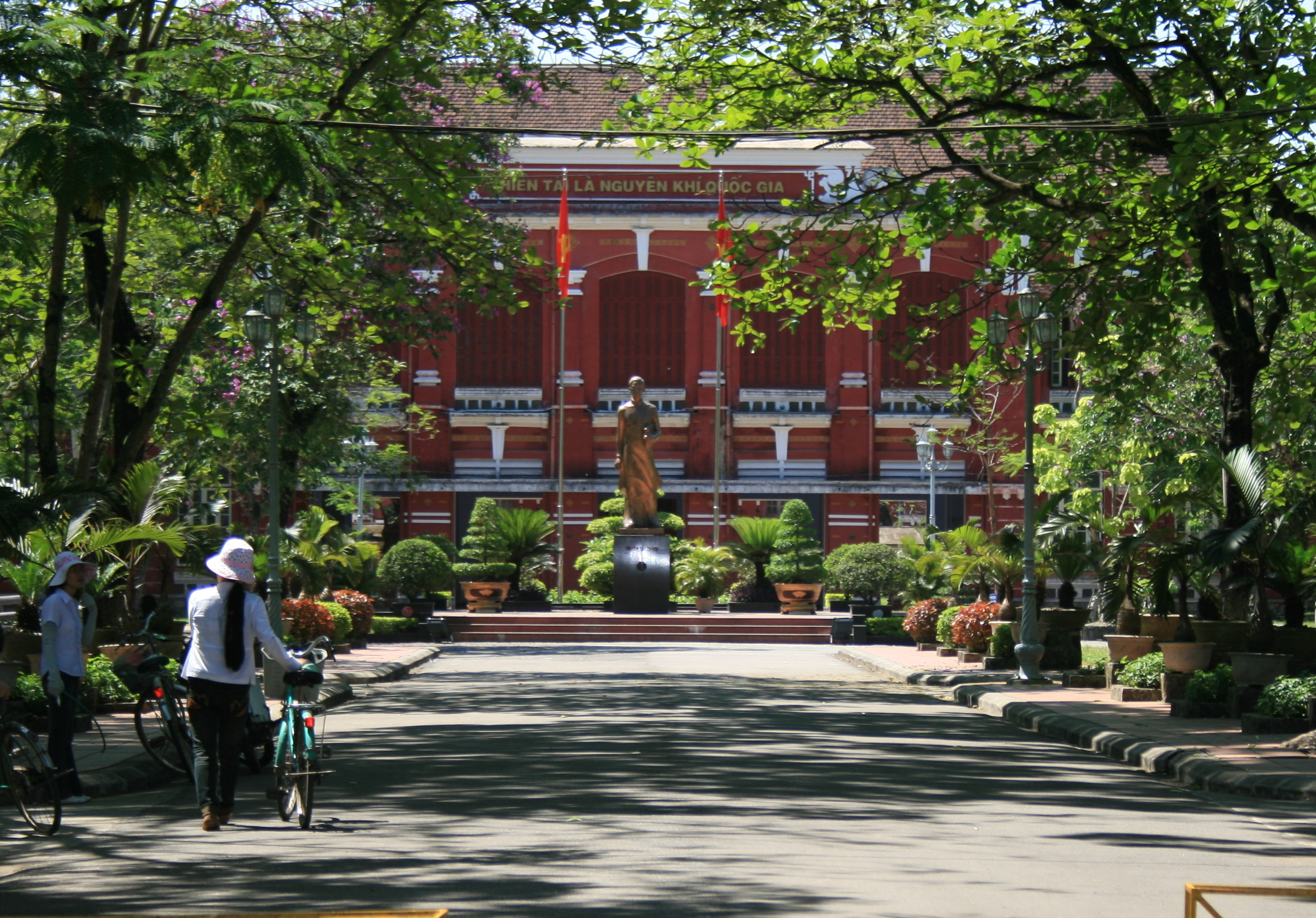
Nguyễn Tất Thành statue on campus.

=== Location ===
The school was built on the site once known as the Admiral's Palace, a royal naval base established in 1806 (the fifth year of Emperor Gia Long's reign). Quốc Học – Huế is located on the bank of Hương River. It is one of the largest high school campuses of Vietnam with many large shady trees, stone benches, and French architectural-designed buildings.

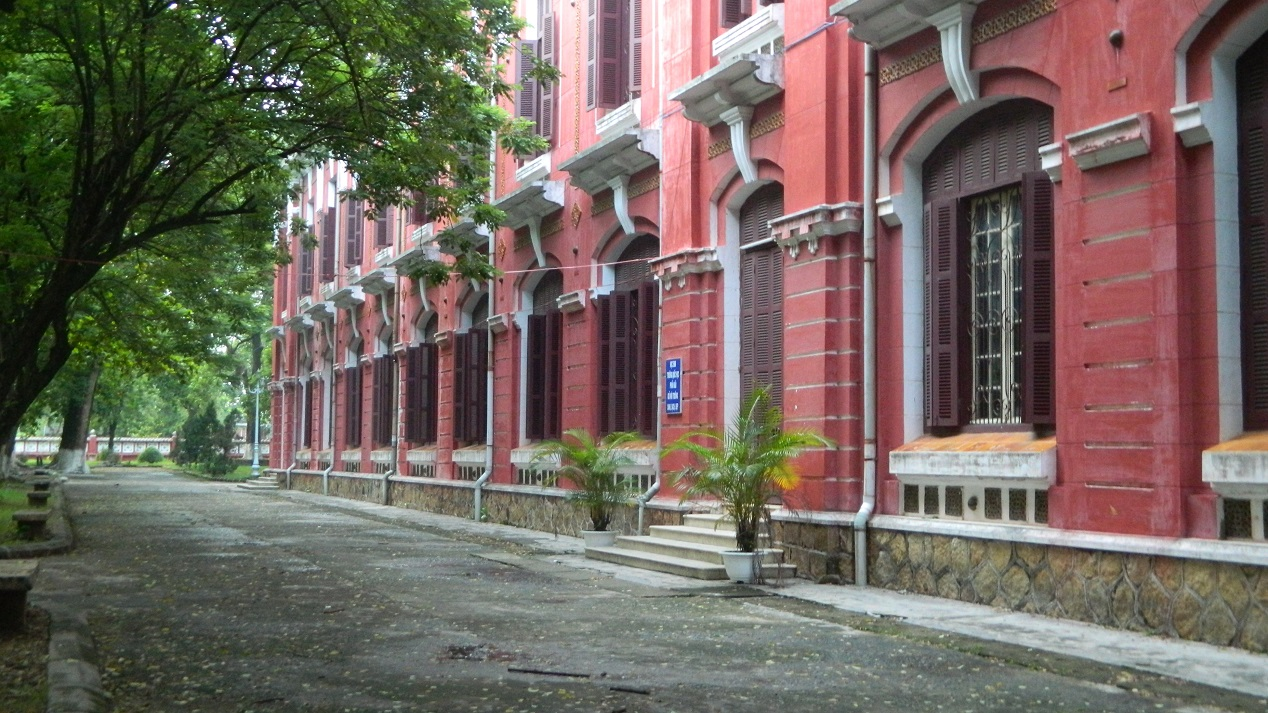
Classrooms at Quốc Học – Huế.

=== Academic facilities ===
The school has one library which opens 6 days per week, two English labs, two French labs, four computer rooms and many science labs. It has 45 over 50 classrooms with modals, projectors, computers and speakers equipped.

=== Sport and other facilities ===
Quốc Học – Huế has one big soccer field, one basketball court, one tennis court, five badminton courts, one swimming pool, one medium stadium, one hall and one cafeteria . The school dormitory can accommodate over 60 students. All of the students come from other provinces and remote areas.

== Admissions ==
Admissions to Quốc Học is extremely competitive. In order to be considered, all applicants must meet the pre-requisite of good academic strength and good moral character in the last grade of junior high school. Most importantly, applicants must pass an entrance examination with decent scores in two required subjects (Math, Vietnamese Literature), and two other self-chosen subjects, in addition to one subject of the specialized classes. Every year, Quốc Học High School attracts more than 6,000 candidates from Thừa Thiên–Huế and other central provinces from whom nearly 400 are selected to be students.

== Educational models and programs ==
=== Academics ===
Since the academic year of 2012-2013, the school only organizes the specialized classes which follows the target of becoming a featured specialized school without the traditional ordinary classes. The specialized classes focus on one particular subject that students chose when they submitted their applications. Recently, Quoc Hoc - Huế has organizes about 40 classes of the following subjects: Mathematics, Physics, Chemistry, Biology, Computer Science, Vietnamese Literature, History, Geography, English, Japanese and French. The students in these classes have more academic hours than the students of other schools. The curriculum is extremely demanding, statistically equivalent to that of junior level through senior level in universities. This is why it is more difficult for students to be admitted in the specialized classes. The total number of students in one specialized class is limited under 30 in order for the students in the former to perform experiments easily and to receive more attention and directions from teachers. Quốc Học - Huế has 150 faculty staff members, which 40 hold a master's degree.

=== Academic achievements ===
- Over the last 116 years, Quốc Học – Huế also has been known as a place that promotes the traditions of patriotism, industriousness, and respect for the time-honored values of teacher-student relationships. In the academic year 2007–08, the percentage of students having passed the graduating exams was 100% and 96.6% were admitted into universities.
- Quốc Học – Huế students have won awards nationally and internationally, including International Mathematical Olympiad (IMO) and International Physics Olympiad (IPhO).

=== International co-operations and overseas study opportunities for students ===
- Every year since 2000, the school has had some exchanged students studying in the United States of America. Quốc Học – Huế also cooperates with Ritsumeikan Kesho School in Japan. In addition, the school exchanges with some schools in Singapore and Thailand.

== Student life ==
=== Athletics ===
Annually, the traditional football, badminton and swimming competitions are held to encourage the students the sportive spirit.

=== Arts and culture ===
The school has opened more than 10 different kinds of extra-curricular clubs which meet the students' hobbies, such as Quốc Học media club - Humans of Quoc Hoc (HQH), Quoc Hoc – Huế Music Club, Quốc Học Artsy Zone (QAZ), Quốc Học – Huế Red-Cross Club, Quoc Hoc – Huế Club for Soft Skills, Ho Chi Minh Communism Youth Union of Quốc Học – Huế, Quốc Học – Huế Basketball Club - Windteam, Quốc Học – Huế PingPong Club, The Anecdotist Debate Club (TAD), The Dandelion - Quoc Hoc Model United Nations club, etc. Now, since 2020, it has opened 25 clubs in total. In addition, numerous events and festivals are organized annually or occasionally to draw publicity as well as benefit students' life, most prominent of which are Quoc Hoc Anniversary Festival on every 23 October, Quoc Hoc Prom Night, FIFTEEN - event for Quoc Hoc's first year students.

== Notable alumni ==
=== Politics ===
- Hồ Chí Minh - former President of the Democratic Republic of Vietnam (Dismissed 1908 for revolutionary activities)
- Ngô Đình Diệm - former President of the Republic of Vietnam
- Trần Phú - The First General Secretary of the Communist Party of Vietnam
- Phạm Văn Đồng - former Prime Minister of the Socialist Republic of Vietnam
- Võ Nguyên Giáp - former commander-in-chief of the Vietnam People's Army
- Nguyễn Chí Diểu - former Secretary of the Communist Party of Ho Chi Minh City, Vietnam
- Hải Triều - Theorist of Marxist idealism

=== Culture ===
- Trần Hoàn (songwriter)
- Phạm Tuyên (songwriter)
- Huy Cận (poet)
- Xuân Diệu (poet)
- Tố Hữu (poet)
- Tôn Thất Tiết (music composer)
- Lưu Trọng Lư (poet, writer, play writer)

=== Science & Education ===
- Lê Tự Quốc Thắng (Thang T. Q. Le) - Professor in Mathematics, Georgia Institute of Technology, known for Le-Murakami-Ohtsuki invariant.
- Tạ Quang Bửu - Minister for National Defence (8/1947 – 7/1948), Minister of Education (10/1965 – 7/1976)
- Đặng Thai Mai - Minister for Education (3/1946 – 11/1946)
- Đào Duy Anh - Historian and lexicographer
- Đặng Văn Ngữ - Medical doctor and researcher
- Tôn Thất Tùng - Medical doctor and researcher
- Lê Viết Quốc - Machine learning pioneer

== Accreditation ==
- Since 1990, Quốc Học High School has been recognized as a historical place in Huế City.
- Since the academic year of 1994-1995, Quốc Học has been designated as one of the three National High School of high proficiency declared by the Prime Minister (the other two schools are Lê Hồng Phong High School of Ho Chi Minh City and Chu Van An High School of Hanoi).
- In 2000, the school was unanimously nominated as a candidate to receive the title of "Hero of Labour" by the people's Committees of Thừa Thiên Huế Province and by the Province Education and Training Service.
- Quốc Học High School was awarded twice for the Order of Independence of First Grade by the President of Vietnam in 1996 and 2007, while Chu Van An of Hanoi and Lê Hồng Phong of Ho Chi Minh City was awarded once.
