= VNU University of Engineering and Technology =

- Trường Đại học Công nghệ, Đại học Quốc gia Hà Nội
- Type: Public
- Established: 2004
- Parent institution: Vietnam National University, Hanoi
- Rector: Nguyễn Việt Hà
- Faculty: 179
- Administrative staff: 55
- Undergraduates: 3361 (2017)
- Location: Hanoi, Vietnam; 21°02′18″N 105°46′55″E
- Campus: Suburban
- Website: e.uet.vnu.edu.vn
- Location within Vietnam

VNU University of Engineering and Technology (VNU-UET; Vietnamese: Trường Đại học Công nghệ, Đại học Quốc gia Hà Nội), or Hanoi University of Engineering and Technology, is a member of Vietnam National University, Hanoi (VNU). Established on 25 May 2004 from the Faculty of Technology, it has grown over the years into one of the top universities in Vietnam for Information Technology and Engineering majors.

== Academics ==
=== Faculty and School ===
- Faculty of Information Technology
- Faculty of Electronics and Telecommunications
- Faculty of Engineering Physics and Nanotechnology
- Faculty of Mechatronics and Automation
- School of Aerospace Engineering
- Faculty of Agricultural Technology
- Department of Engineering and Technology in Construction and Transportation

=== Research Institutes, Key Labs, and Centers ===
- Intelligent Sorfware Engineering (iSE)
- Advanced Institute of Engineering and Technology (AVITECH)
- Laboratory on Smart Integrated Systems (SISLAB)
- Laboratory for Micro-Nano Technology (Micro-Nano Lab)
- Center of Electronics and Telecommunications
- Center of Multidisciplinary Integrated Technologies for Field Monitoring (FIMO)
