= Trương Anh Ngọc =

Vietnamese journalist (born 1976)

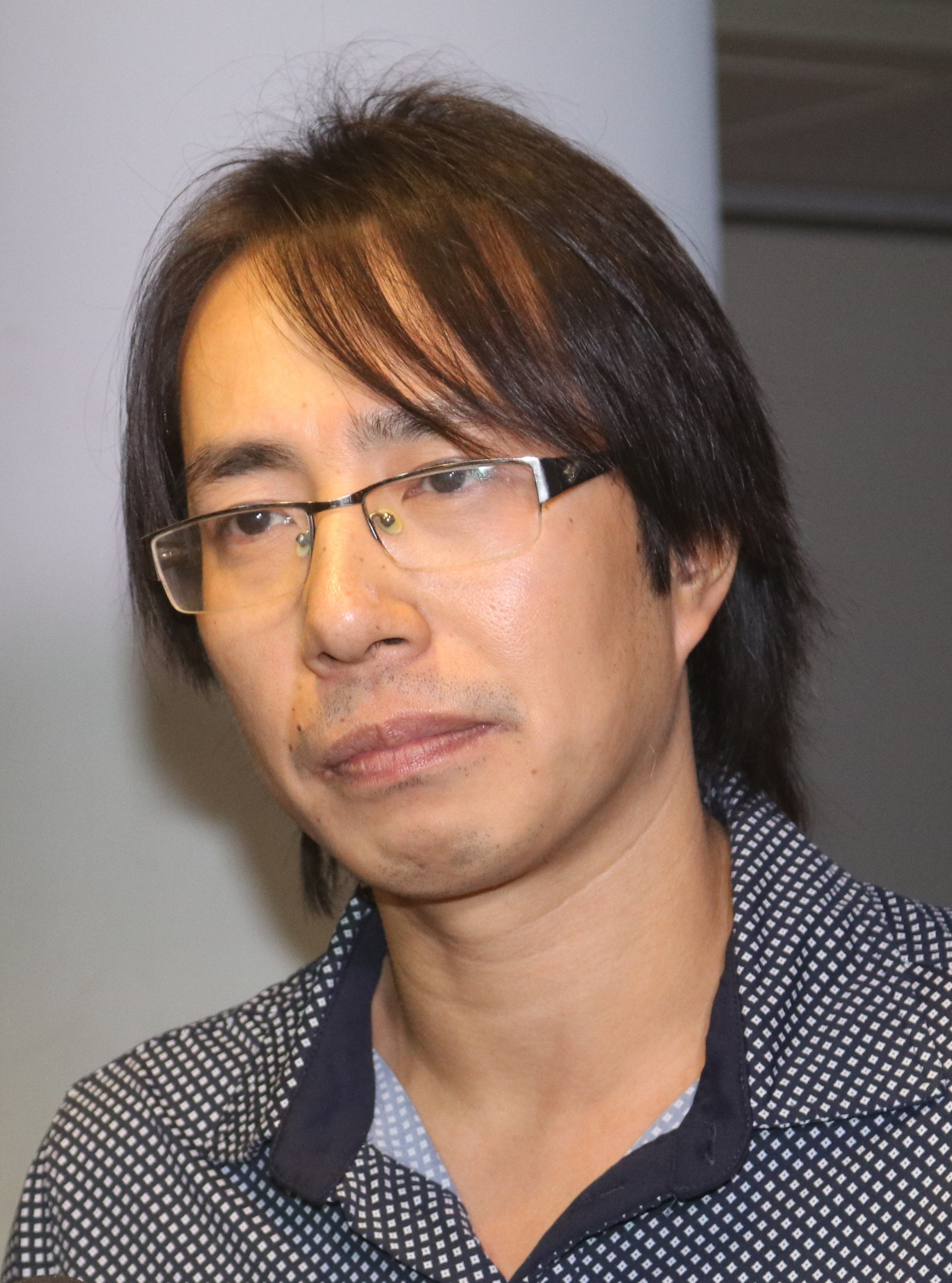
- Born: Trương Anh Ngọc; January 19, 1976 (age 50); Hanoi, North Vietnam
- Other name: Chị Thỏ Ngọc
- Education: VNU University of Social Sciences and Humanities; Nanyang Technological University
- Occupations: International reporter; Sports editor; Football commentator; Writer
- Years active: 1998–present
- Organization(s): Hanoi Radio Television (1998–2002), Vietnam News Agency (2002–present)
- Notable work: Nước Ý, câu chuyện tình của tôi (2012); Phút 90++ (2013); Nghìn ngày nước Ý, nghìn ngày yêu (2017); Hẹn hò với Paris (2018); Đi khi ta còn trẻ (2022)
- Spouse: Nguyễn Thanh Thủy (m. 2002)
- Children: Trương Anh Thư (born 2003)
- Website: Trương Anh Ngọc on Facebook

Trương Anh Ngọc (born January 19, 1976) is a Vietnamese international news reporter, sports reporter, football commentator, writer and journalist. Anh Ngọc is known as one of the top sports reporters in Vietnam, especially about football and especially Italian football. In addition, he is also famous as one of the favorite commentators through many tournaments and as a reporter covering major domestic and international sports events. Since 2010, he is the first and only Vietnamese reporter to be invited by the prestigious magazine France Football to vote for the Ballon d'Or title.

Besides being a sports reporter, Anh Ngoc's main job is an international news reporter. He was the head of the permanent office of Vietnam News Agency in Italy in the period 2007–2010 and 2013–2016. During the period 2010–2013 and 2016 up to now, he has also worked as an editor and then as editorial secretary for the Thể thao & Văn hóa newspaper, in addition, he is also a collaborator of many television stations and many major newspapers and magazines. Since February 2011, he owns a separate column in the newspaper Thể thao & Văn hóa called Anh Ngọc & Calcio, followed by a weekly show of the same name from September 2012 on the system of Tổng Công ty Truyền hình Cáp Việt Nam (VTVCab). He is also the one who launched the movement "Cheerful football with culture" in the Vietnamese football community in early 2013. From 2018, he returned to work as a commentator for Serie A on TV channel FPT.

Besides being a reporter, Anh Ngoc has also released autobiographical books about his journey of discovery and work. The first book Nước Ý, câu chuyện tình của tôi was released in May 2012 to very positive reviews from fans. Subsequent autographs Phút 90++ (2013), Nghìn ngày nước Ý, nghìn ngày yêu (2017), Hẹn hò với Paris (2018) and Đi khi ta còn trẻ (2022) all have a certain amount of success.
