= VNU Vietnam Japan University =

Joint education initiative

- Trường Đại học Việt Nhật, Đại học Quốc gia Hà Nội
- Type: Public
- Established: September 9, 2016; 9 years ago
- Affiliations: VNU Hanoi
- Rector: Dr Nguyen Hoang Anh
- Location: Hanoi, Vietnam; 21°02′N 105°46′E
- Website: vju.vnu.edu.vn
- Location within Vietnam

VNU Vietnam Japan University (VNU-VJU, Vietnamese: Trường Đại học Việt Nhật, Japanese: 日越大学, romanized: Nichi-Estu Daigaku) is the seventh university under the Vietnam National University, Hanoi (VNU). It was established in 2014 following a joint declaration issued by Vietnamese and Japanese governments. Vietnam Japan University collaborates with other Japanese universities and corporations around the world. The main campus of the university is under construction in Hoa Lac Hi-tech Park in Hanoi, Vietnam. The government of Japan invests heavily in Vietnamese higher education, and the VJU is an important part of the program. One goal of this initiative is to give international students access to Japanese higher education and the Japanese job market. One reason for the initiative with respect to VJU is that success with respect to these goals has so far been limited. By design, the VJU is meant to grow into an international university with programs capable of supplying qualified technical graduates to both industry and the public sector.

== History ==
- 2006: The Vietnamese Minister of Education and Training Nguyễn Thiện Nhân requested that the Japan-Vietnam Parliamentarian's Friendship League investigate and plan the establishment of a training institution in cooperation with Japanese companies.
- 2009: A proposal was made at the 1st Conference of the Presidents of Universities of Vietnam and Japan to establish a university that embodied the cultural and educational cooperation between Vietnam and Japan.
- 2010: The governments of Vietnam and Japan issued a joint declaration to consider the establishment of a high-quality university that incorporated Japanese characteristics in Vietnam.
- 2013: The Vietnamese Prime Minister Nguyễn Tấn Dũng and Japanese Prime Minister Shinzō Abe agreed to accelerate the establishment of Vietnam Japan University.
- 2014: Nguyễn Tấn Dũng issued Decision No. 1186/QD - TTG on the establishment of Vietnam Japan University under the Vietnam National University, Hanoi.
- 2015: VNU and Japan International Cooperation Agency (JICA) signed a cooperation agreement, "The Technical Cooperation Project for the Establishment of the Master Programs of Vietnam-Japan University 2015-2020."
- 2016: the opening ceremony and the first entrance ceremony were held on September 9.

== Programs and coordinating universities ==
As of May 2018, there were 7 masters programs and Japanese language courses (common programs) at VJU, with each program having a coordinating Japanese university:

- Area Studies -The University of Tokyo
- Environmental Engineering -The University of Tokyo and Ritsumeikan University
- Business Administration -Yokohama National University
- Global Leadership - Waseda University
- Infrastructure Engineering -The University of Tokyo
- Public Policy -University of Tsukuba
- Nanotechnology -Osaka University
- Climate Change and Development -Ibaraki University
- Japanese language course (common course) -Waseda University

== Partner universities ==
- The University of Kitakyushu
- Kyoto University
- Kobe University
- Showa Women's University
- Takushoku University
- Nagasaki University
- Hosei University

== Rector ==
- Professor Dr. Furuta Motoo became the first foreign rector of the member university of Vietnam National University, Hanoi, in 2016.
