= Bắc Ninh High School for the Gifted =

Bắc Ninh High School for Gifted Students
- Trường Trung học phổ thông chuyên Bắc Ninh
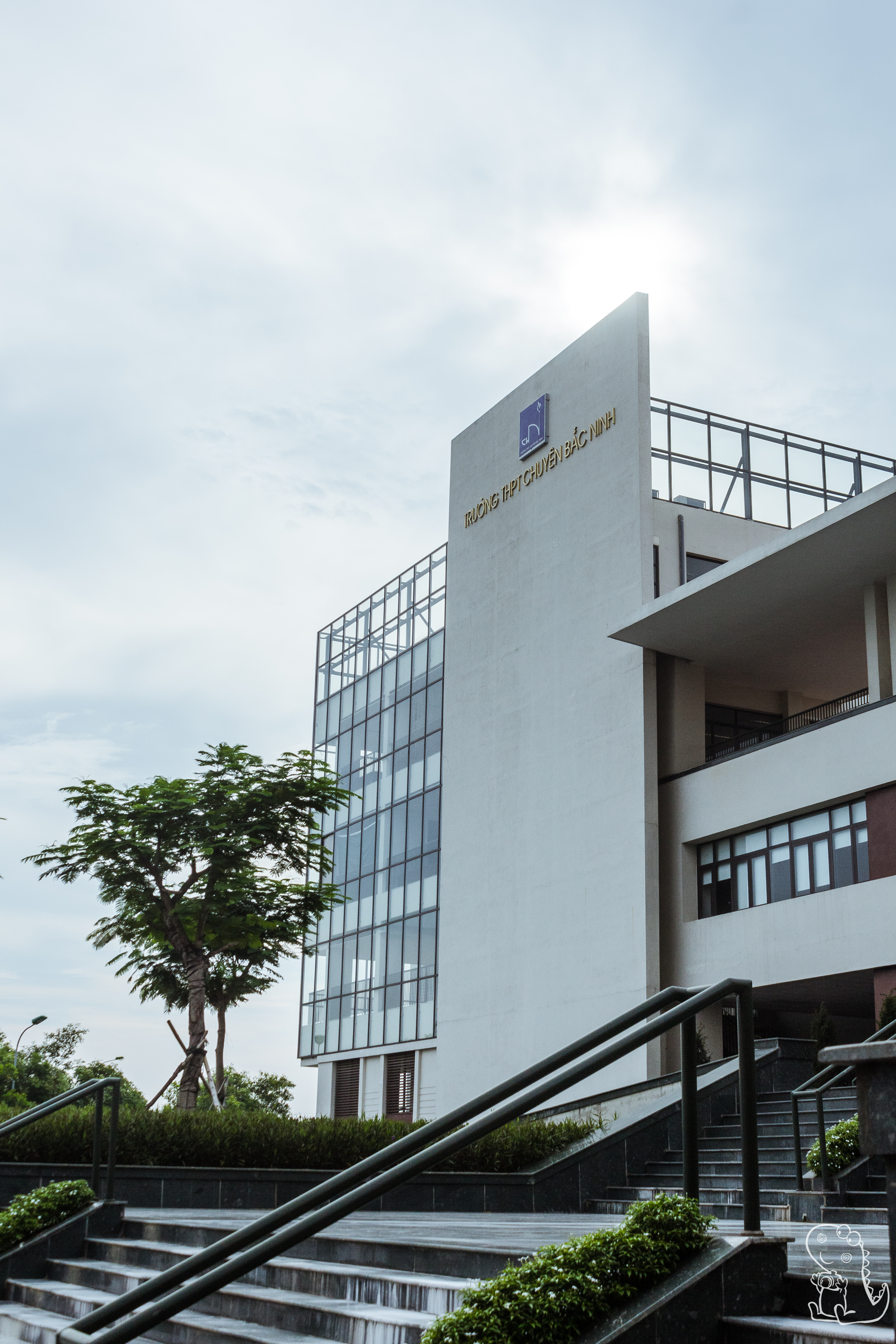

Location
- 4 Hồ Ngọc Lân street, Kinh Bắc ward Bắc Ninh, Bắc Ninh Province; Vietnam
- Coordinates: 21.19082°N 106.06126°E

Information
- Type: Public, Gifted, Advanced Curriculum
- Founded: 1993
- Principal: Hà Huy Phương
- Grades: 10, 11, 12
- Gender: Co-educational
- Enrolment: ~900
- Campus type: Urban
- Color: Blue
- Website: thptchuyenbacninh.bacninh.edu.vn (Vietnamese)

Bắc Ninh High School for Gifted (Vietnamese: Trường Trung học phổ thông chuyên Bắc Ninh) is a high school in Bắc Ninh province, Vietnam. It is established in 1993 as Bac Ninh Gifted School (Secondary and Senior High School). Since 1995, this is the only gifted high school in Bắc Ninh province. The school has many students who have won awards nationally and medalists from International Science Olympiad.

On 22 August 2016, The Bac Ninh High School for Gifted, the most modern in Vietnam, was inaugurated in Bac Ninh city to welcome 1,200 students in the new academic year. The school is built at a cost of 583 billion VND (US$30 million) to international standards. Covering 3.9 hectares (9.6 acres), it comprises a 9-storey main building, a 3-storey hall with 500 seats, a 5-storey building for classrooms and a library, a 12-storey dormitory, and an over 3,000 square metres (32,000 sq ft) sporting hall. The school applies a specialized education model, aiming to develop students’ talents in particular fields, while still ensuring an overall curriculum.

== Images ==
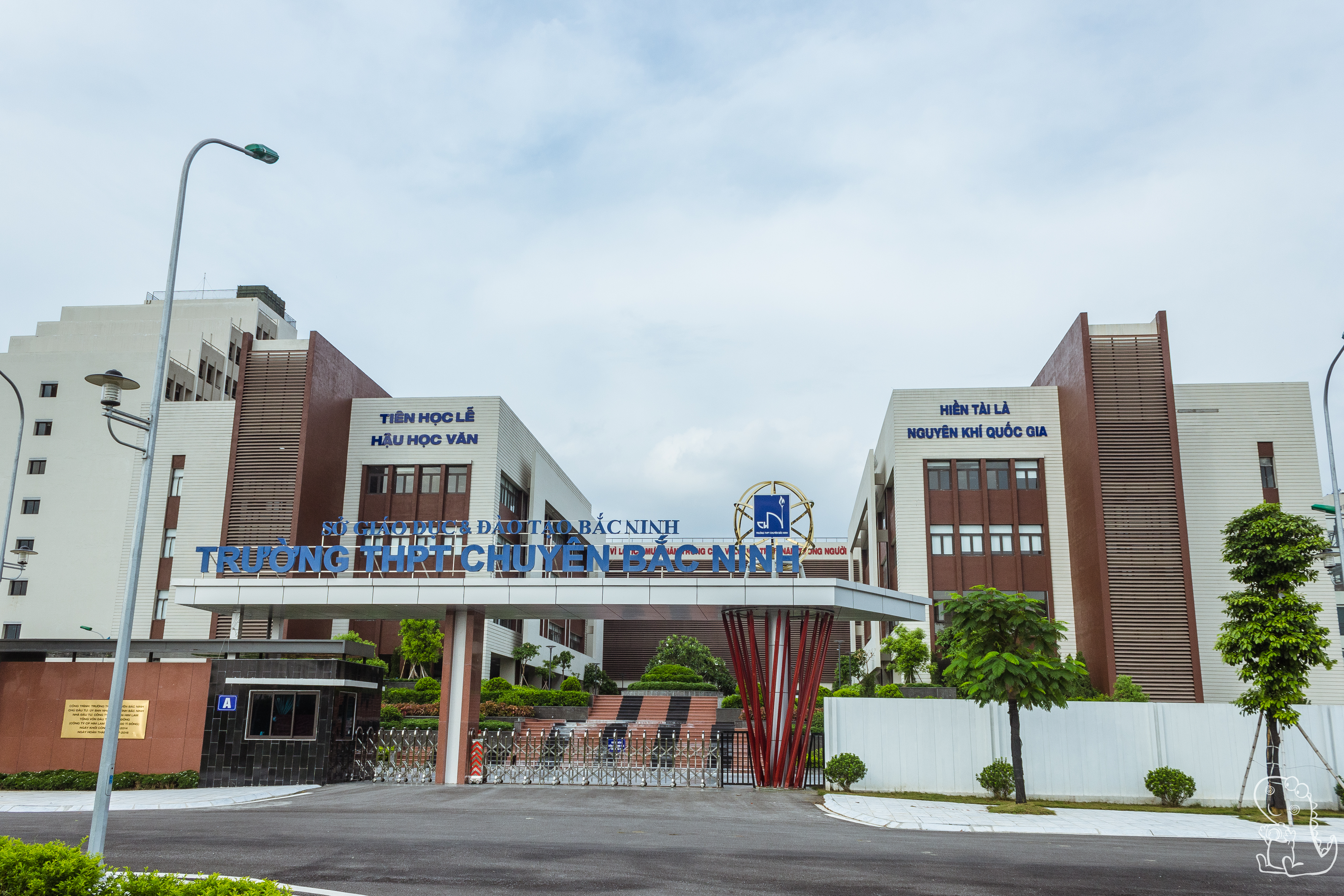
Entrance

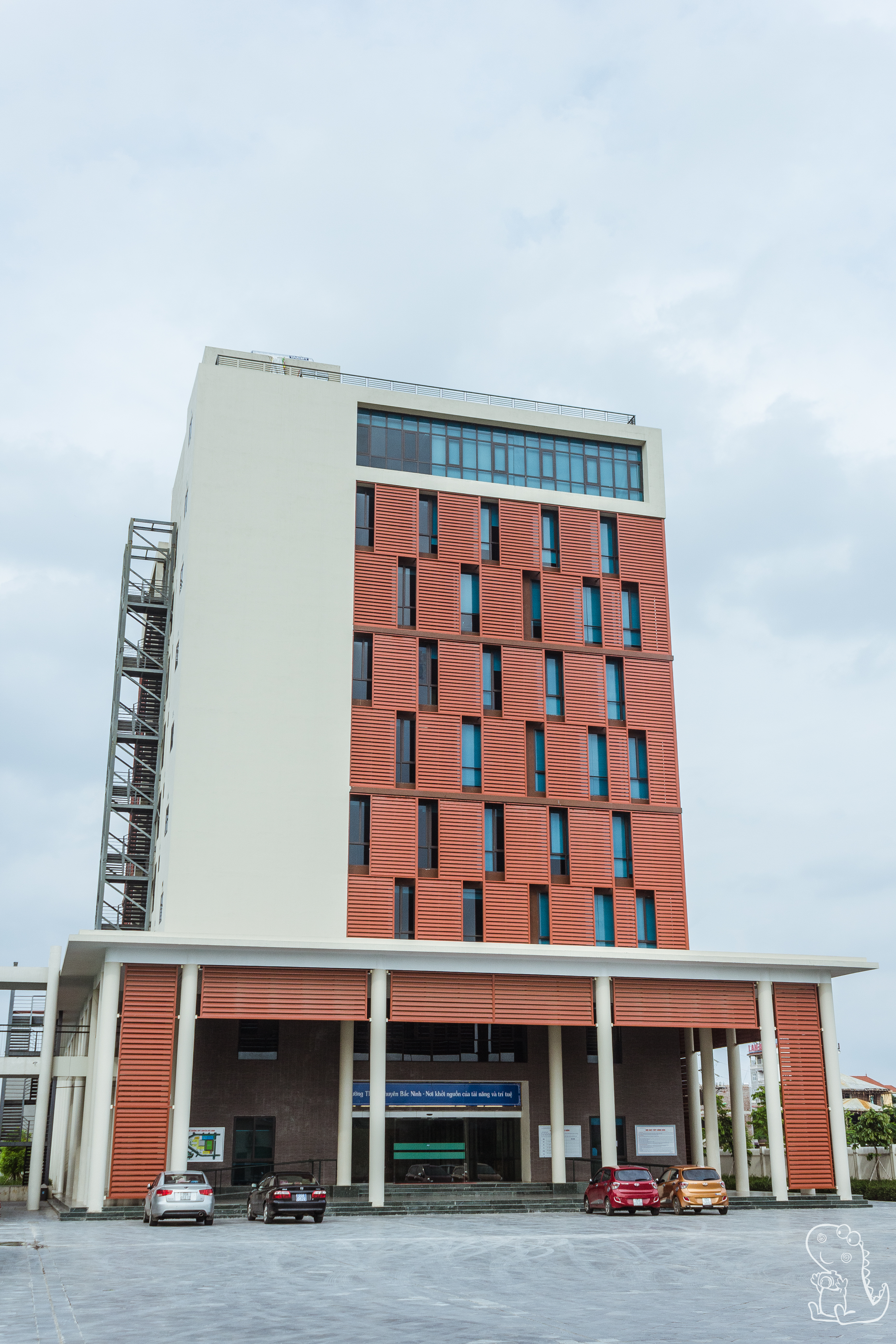
Operation office

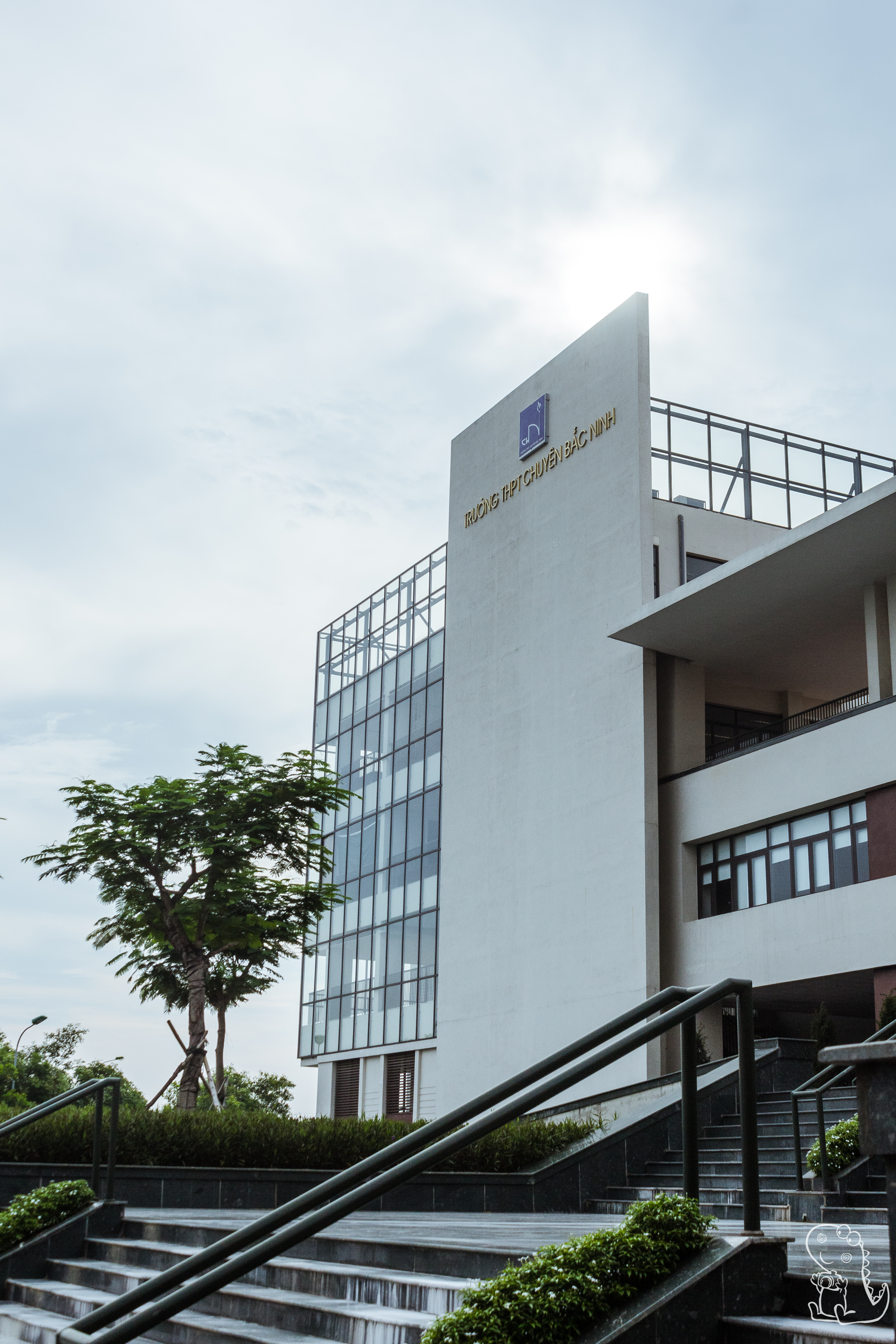
Block 1

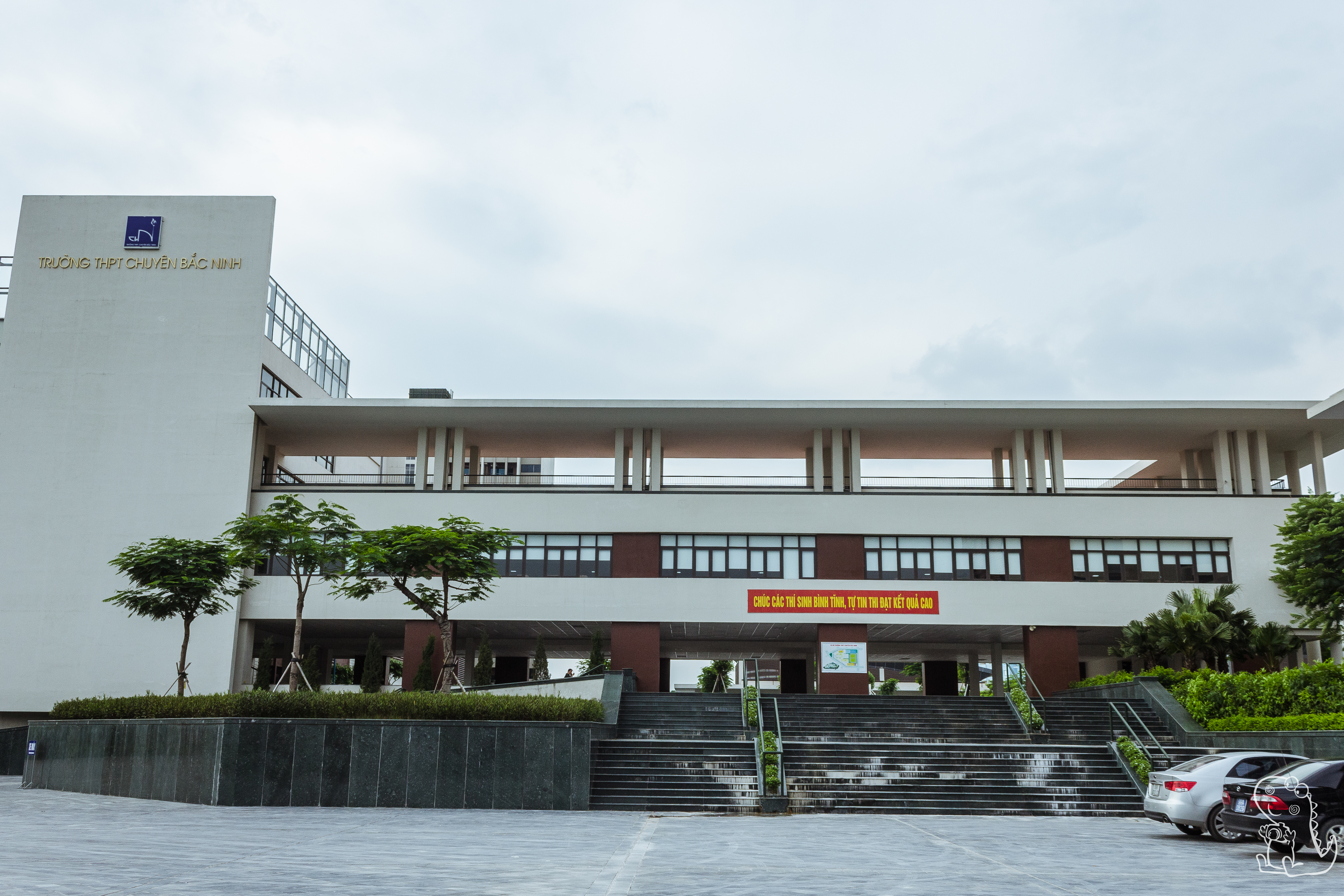
Block 2

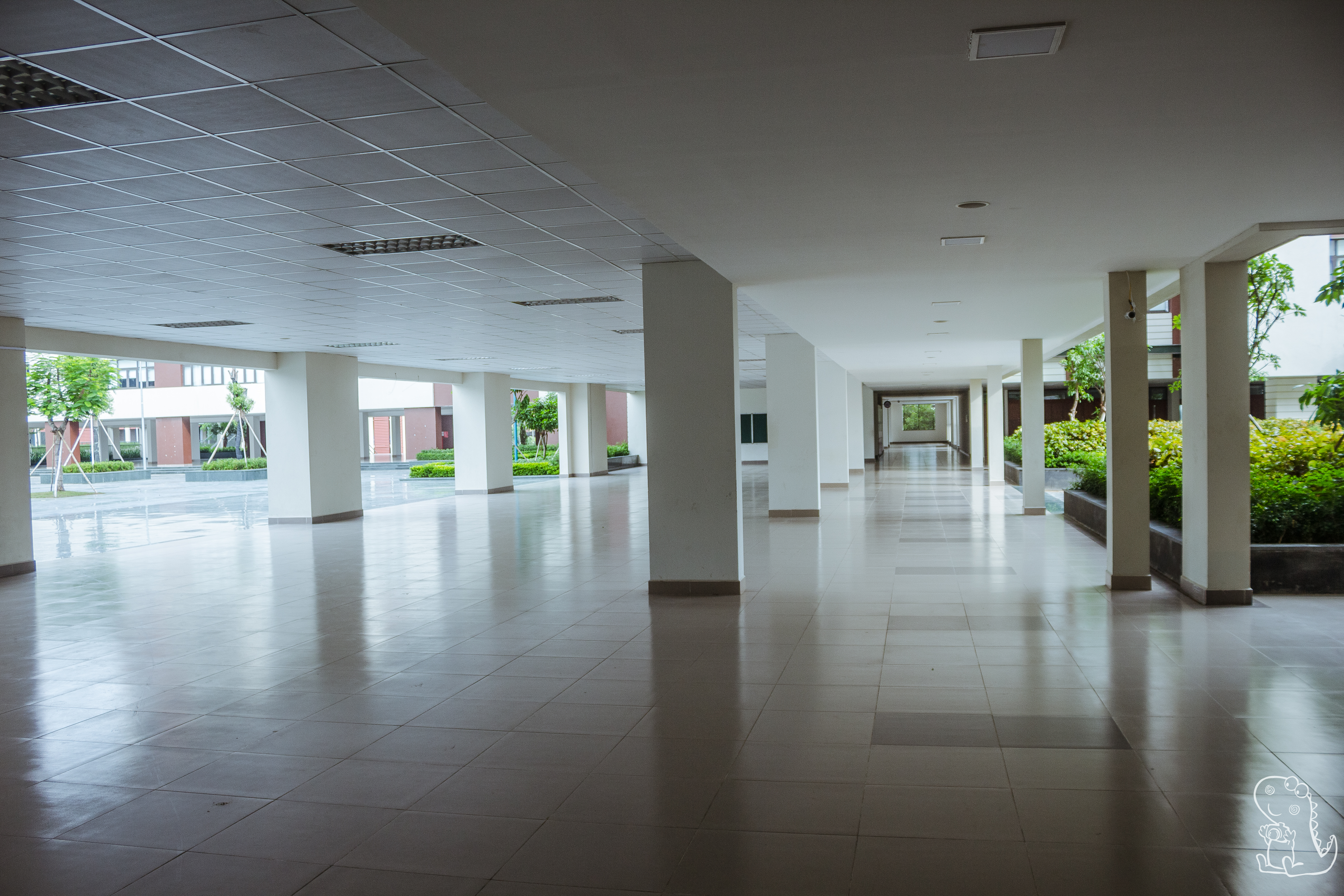
Lobby

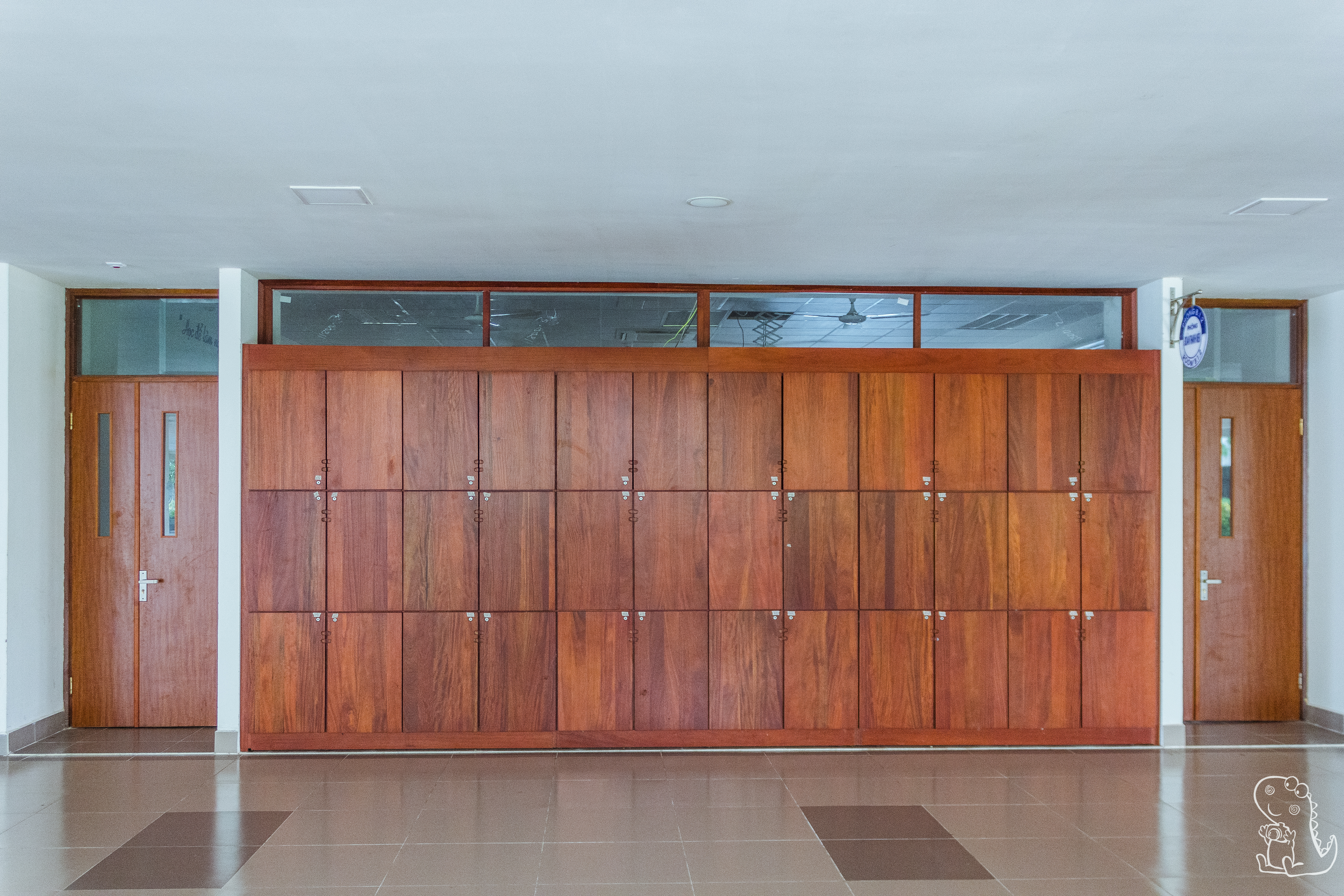
Wardrobe

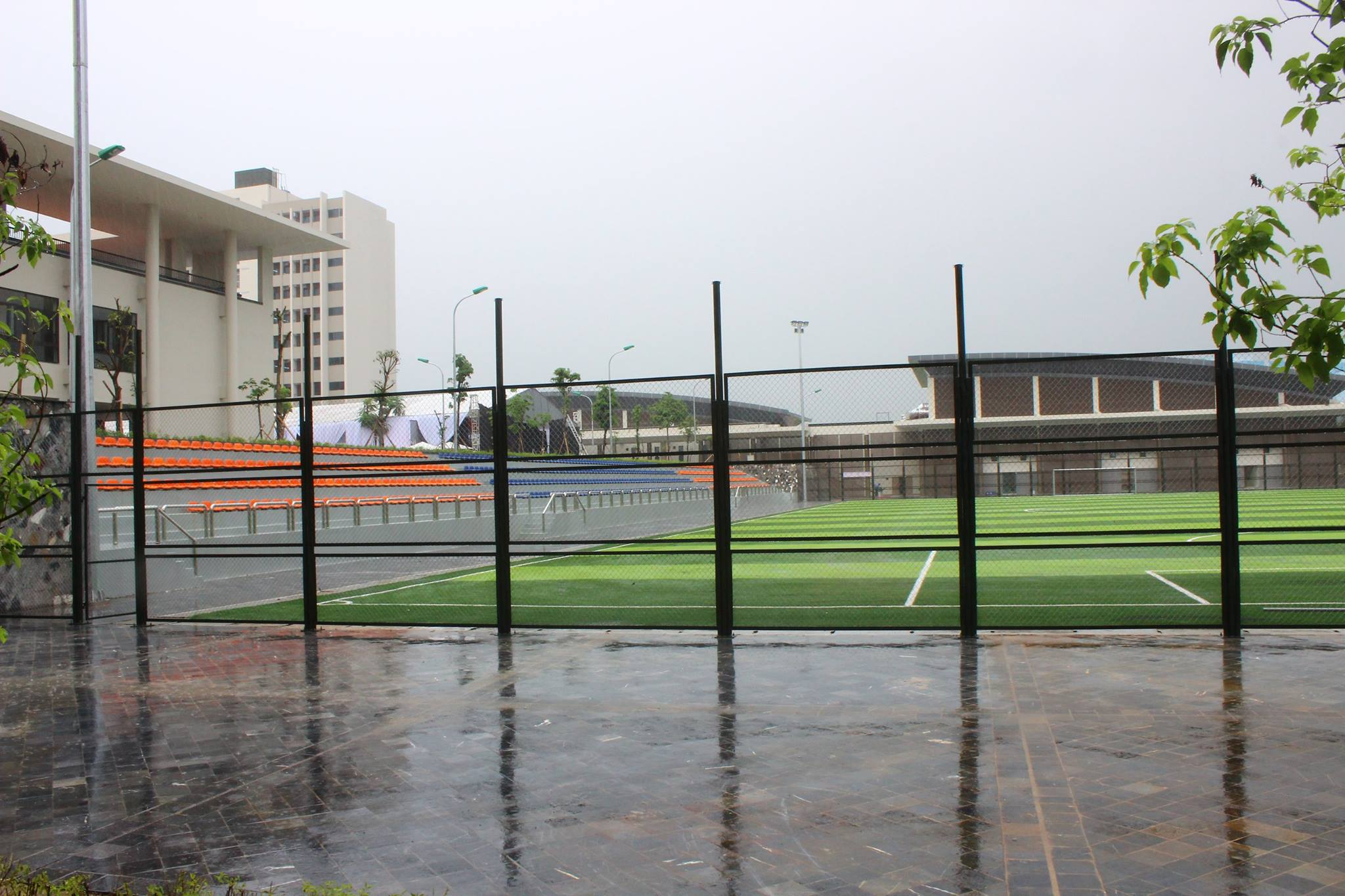
Football pitch

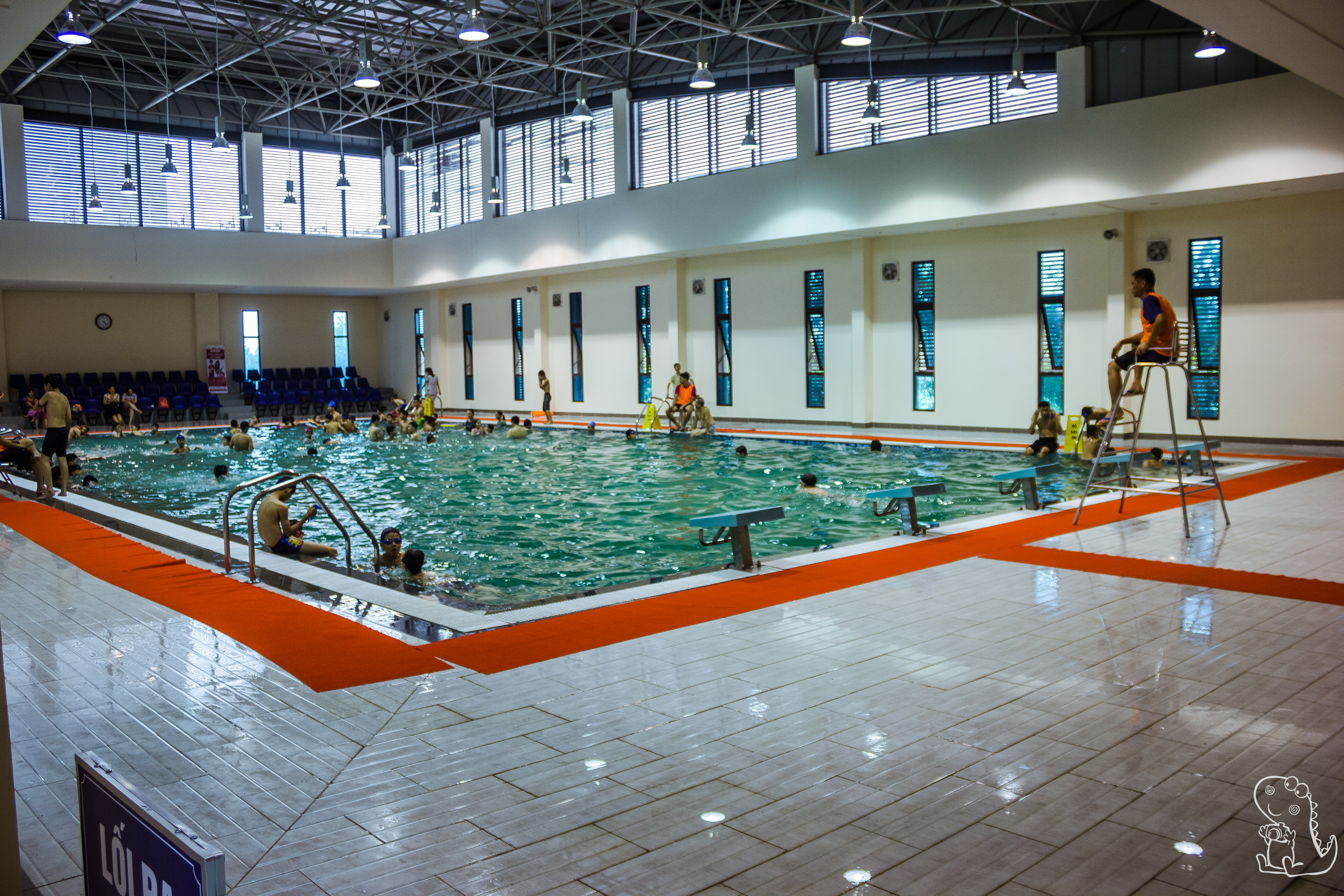
Swimming pool
