= VNU University of Languages and International Studies =

University of linguistic studies located at VNU Cau Giay campus at Hanoi

- Trường Đại học Ngoại ngữ, Đại học Quốc gia Hà Nội
- Former name: College of Foreign Languages
- Motto in English: Creating Opportunities Together
- Type: Public
- Established: 8 November 1955; 70 years ago
- Parent institution: Vietnam National University, Hanoi
- Rector: Nguyen Xuan Long
- Undergraduates: 6158
- Postgraduates: 549
- Other students: 1192
- Location: 2, Pham Van Dong Road, Cau Giay district, Hanoi, Vietnam; 21°02′22″N 105°46′54″E
- Campus: Urban
- Colors: Blue
- Website: www.ulis.vnu.edu.vn

VNU University of Languages and International Studies (VNU-ULIS; Vietnamese: Trường Đại học Ngoại ngữ, Đại học Quốc gia Hà Nội; formerly College of Foreign Languages), or Hanoi University of Languages and International Studies, is one of the nine colleges that comprise Vietnam National University, Hanoi. The school offers undergraduate and graduate degrees in pedagogy and linguistic studies in Arabic, English, French, German, Japanese, Korean, Mandarin Chinese, Russian, and Southeast Asian. The college is located at VNU Cau Giay campus.

ULIS was originally known as the School of Foreign Languages until the 1950s. In 1958, the School of Foreign Languages was merged into Hanoi University of Education, forming its Faculty of Foreign Languages. As one of the three first members of Vietnam National University, Hanoi University of Foreign Language Education since 1993 has been widely known as the University of Languages and International Studies – Vietnam National University, Hanoi (ULIS - VNU). Its international and national staff has enlarged since 2012 and now includes lecturers from many countries including Japan, Russia, France, Germany, Taiwan, Korea, and the United States.

As of 2014, VNU-ULIS offers bachelor's degrees in Translation, Interpreting, and Teacher Education in English, Japanese, Korean, German, Russian, French, Chinese, and Arabic. Students can also join a double major program with many of VNU other universities such as 'International Business' or 'English-Finance and Banking', and 'Economics and Business,' etc.

Graduate programs are offered in English linguistics, as well as French, Japanese, Chinese, and Russian Linguistics. There are also graduate courses where students can receive a masters in Theory and Methodology in Teaching, either for English, French, Russian, or Chinese. Master's degree level courses in English are also offered with a partnership program with Waikato University in New Zealand. Doctorates are offered in English Linguistics, Russian Linguistics, and French.

VNU-ULIS enjoys close international connections with Taiwan, South Korea, the United States, and Japan. Staff and student exchange programs have been successful like the KOICA and the Korean Foundation. ULIS has expanded cooperation with a variety of Korean institutions including the University of Seoul, Yonsei, Chungang, Kookmin, Kyunghee, Hansung, and Inha. ULIS students studying Korean receive valuable scholarships from Korean corporations such as Lotte, Kumho, Samsung, Daewoo, Miwan, Keb, LG, Posco, Booyang, Sellex and others.

Many partnerships have been set up through the Japanese Foundation as well. The Japanese Foundation is an arm of the Japanese Ministry of Foreign Affairs and has been active with ULIS with special guests and lectures, student trips, and short training courses in Japan. Other connections with Japan include University of Kumamoto Gakuen (considered a sister university to ULIS), Daikaku, Nagaoka, Tokyo Foreign Language University, as well as several agreements with various business firms from Japan. VNU-ULIS was the first institution in Vietnam to offer degrees in Japanese Language Teacher Education.

VNU-ULIS is the only institution in Vietnam to have a bachelor program in German language teacher education. The joint ULIS-Southern New Hampshire University (USA) English program constitutes the institution's intensive English studies program.

There are also other joint agreements where students can earn credit or a degree from various partner institutions such as the University of Picardie Jules Verne in France. Students can also spend two years at the ULIS campus and then another two years in China and receive degree credit from Shanxi Normal University, Huadong Normal University.

Besides the various programs and international agreements, several training and research centers follow under the ULIS umbrella organization. These include the Centre for Foreign Language Education Research and Quality Assurance, Centre for Research and Application of Information Technology in Teaching and Learning Foreign Languages, Centre for Distance Training and Teacher Development, and the Centre for International Education. The university also has close ties with the Foreign Languages Specializing School (FLSS). This school, established in 1969 and affiliated under the ULIS administration, is considered to be one of the best high schools for foreign language study in Vietnam. The national public magnet institution, Foreign Languages Specializing High School is also a part of the VNU University of Languages and International Studies.
