= Trần Quốc Vượng (historian) =

Trần Quốc Vượng (Vietnamese pronunciation: [t͡ɕən˨˩ kuək̚˧˦ vɨəŋ˧˨ʔ]; 12 December 1934 – 8 August 2005) was a Vietnamese historian, archaeologist, and culturologist. He was part of the generation including Hà Văn Tấn, and Phan Huy Lê that had formed the foundation of Vietnamese History Studies since the 1950s. Since 1956, he was Professor of University of Social Sciences and Humanities - Vietnam National University, Hanoi and gave lectures on Vietnamese Ancient-Middle History, Archaeology, and Culturology until 2005.

== Biographical Notes ==
Born on December 12, 1934, in Kinh Mon Village, Hải Dương province, Trần Quốc Vượng graduated as Bachelor of History-Geography at University of Hanoi. He was then invited to teach at the University of Hanoi (later known as University of Social Sciences and Humanities, Vietnam National University, Hanoi). He studied archaeology during 1959-60 and together with renowned Archaeology Institute director and professor Hà Văn Tấn led the way in unearthing Vietnam's archaeological history. He was made a Full Professor in 1980.

He held the Rockefeller Foundation visiting fellowship named Rockefeller Residency Fellowships in the Humanities at Cornell University's Centre for Southeast Asian Studies during 1990-91. At Cornell, he focused his research on the "Evolution and Structure of Vietnamese Folk Culture."

Professor Trần Quốc Vượng's many posts included deputy general secretary of the Association of Vietnamese Folklorists and first president of the Hanoi History Association.

Professor Trần Quốc Vượng, who wrote about a variety of subjects ranging from history, archaeology to folklore, was among the first to begin a systematic study of Vietnam's culture. In 1960, he translated and provided notes to Đại Việt sử lược (ancient Chinese: 大越史略), or Sketches of Vietnam's History, one of the country's most ancient surviving works. In 1973, he was the chief author of the two-edition Danh nhân Hà Nội (Hanoi's Famous Personalities) and in 1975, in collaboration with Vũ Tuân Sán he wrote Hà Nội Nghìn Xưa, or Thousand-year Hanoi. In 1976, he worked with Lê Văn Hảo and Dương Tất Từ to write Mùa xuân và phong tục Việt Nam (Vietnam or Spring and Vietnam's Customs). All were expressions of his desire to contribute all his knowledge to recording his country's history.

== Notable works ==
- Việt Nam khảo cổ học 1991
- "Popular Culture and High Culture in Vietnamese History." (1992)
- Trong cõi (California, 1993)
- Theo dòng lịch sử (1995)
- Some aspects of Vietnam culture (USA、1995)
- Tìm hiểu văn hoá dân gian Hà Nội (1997)
- Việt Nam, cái nhìn địa văn hoá (1998)
- Vietnam folklore and history (North Illinois, 1998)
- Essay into the Vietnam past (New York, 1999)
- Ngành nghề, tổ nghề, làng nghề Việt Nam (1999)
- Làng nghề, phố nghề Thăng Long, Hà Nội (2000)
- Văn hoá Việt Nam, tìm tòi và suy ngẫm (2000)
- Trên mảnh đất nghìn năm văn vật (2001)
- Tìm hiểu bản sắc văn hoá xứ Huế (2001)
- Confucianism in East Asia (Seoul 2001)
- Khoa Sử và tôi (2001)
- Tìm hiểu bản sắc văn hoá xứ Quảng (2002)
- Tìm hiểu bản sắc văn hoá dân gian Nam Bộ (2004)
- Hà Nội như tôi hiểu (2005)
- Con người – Môi trường – Văn hoá (2005)
