= Phan Huy Lê =

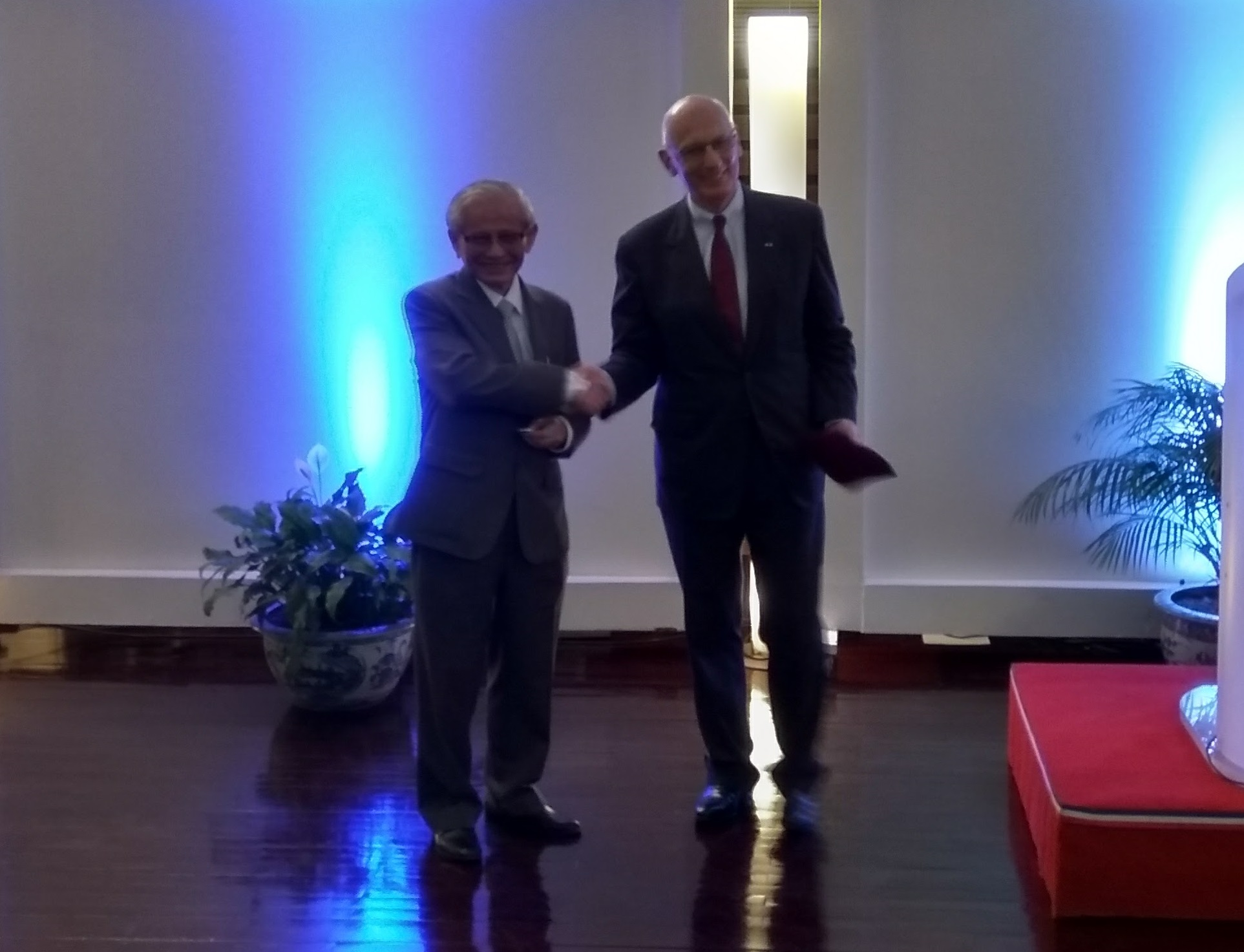
Historian Phan Huy Le (left) receive a medal from Professor Michel Zink at the French Embassy in Vietnam, 2017

Phan Huy Lê (Vietnamese pronunciation: [faːn˧˧ hwi˧˧ le˧˧]; Thạch Châu, Lộc Hà district, Hà Tĩnh province, 23 February 1934 – 23 June 2018) was a Vietnamese historian and professor of history at the Hanoi National University.

He authored of many studies on village society, landholding patterns and peasant revolution in particular, and in Vietnamese history in general.

Phan was director of the Center for Vietnamese and Intercultural Studies at Vietnam National University, Hanoi.

Phan belonged to the school of historians, including also Trần Quốc Vượng distinguishing 'Vietnamese-ness' without relation to Chinese influences.
