= Hà Văn Tấn =

Vietnamese historian (1937–2019)

Hà Văn Tấn (Vietnamese pronunciation: [haː˨˩ van˧˧ tən˧˦]; 16 August 1937 – 27 November 2019) was a Vietnamese historian, archeologist, and scholar of Buddhism. He was born in Tiên Điền, Nghi Xuân, Hà Tĩnh, and became a professor at Vietnam National University, Hanoi.
