= Foreign Language Specialized School =

Public magnet high school in Hanoi, Vietnam

- Trường Trung học phổ thông chuyên Ngoại ngữ

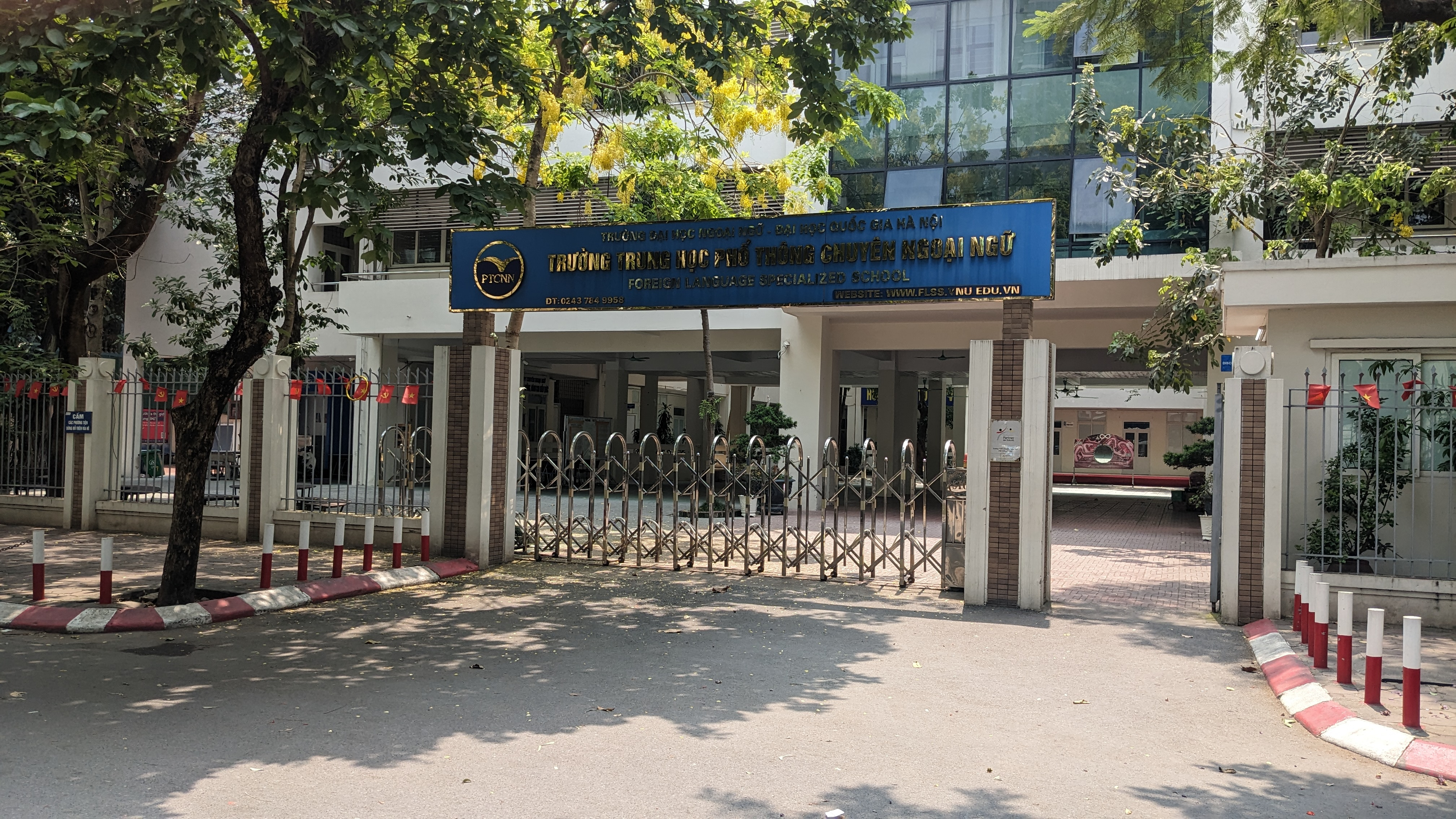
- School gate in 2026.

Location
- 2 Pham Van Dong Road; Cau Giay, Hanoi; Vietnam

Information
- Type: Public
- Established: 1969
- Principal: Dr. Nguyễn Phú Chiến
- Faculty: 130
- Grades: 10-12
- Enrollment: 2,028 (2025-2026)
- Website: flss.vnu.edu.vn

Foreign Language Specialized School (Vietnamese: Trường Trung học phổ thông chuyên Ngoại ngữ), commonly known as FLSS or CNN, is a public magnet high school and university-preparatory school in Hanoi, Vietnam. A child high school of VNU University of Languages and International Studies, the school is one of four nationally-owned gifted high schools in Hanoi. Currently, FLSS is Vietnam's only high school specialized in teaching foreign languages (Chinese, English, French, German, Japanese, Korean and Russian). Students can also choose to study the above languages, excluding the student's already-specialized language, (Note: For example, if the student's specialization is Korean, the second applied language must be any language other than Korean.) alongside Italian and Spanish as a Second Foreign Language subject.

FLSS ranks third nationally in the 2012 Vietnam university admission ranking. Admission to FLSS is by competitive examination only, which until 2016 consisted of three subjects: specialized foreign language (self-declared by examinees), mathematics, and literature. Since 2017, the admission process has adopted a more comprehensive approach. There are now three parts to the admission exams: one on declared foreign language, one on mathematics and natural science subjects, and one on literature and social science subjects. Non-English language exams require an interview round beside the written tests. FLSS is one of the most selective high schools in Vietnam with an acceptance rate of approximately 11% in 2017.

A student from FLSS/CNN is usually referred to as a CNNer.

== History ==
FLSS's official logo until July 15, 2009

- Foreign Language Specialized School was first founded as a program for foreign language specialized high school classes in 1969 by a decision from the head of the Ministry of Education and Training with direct administration from VNU University of Languages and International Studies (formerly College of Foreign Languages). Ngo Ngoc Buu, Ph.D. was appointed to be the first program director (1969-1970).
- In December 1969, Class of 1972 had to evacuate to Tho Trai, Tien Son, Ha Bac.
- In 1971, teachers and students returned to the College of Foreign Languages in Hanoi, and classes took place in cottages, commonly known as the "Banana Garden." The President of the College of Foreign Languages appointed Nguyen Thao Luoc, Ph.D. to be the new program director (1971-1977).
- In 1972, during the Vietnam War, two evacuations took place, one to Hong Ha, Dan Phuong, Son Tay, and one to Quang Trung, An Thi, Hai Hung.
- In 1973, the school returned to the College of Foreign Languages.
- In 1977, Vu Thi Viet, Ph.D. became the new program director (1977-1990).
- In 1986, classes for ethnic minority students were opened (through nomination without actual admission).
- In 1987, the program started college-preparatory classes.
- In 1988, the program extended to a semi-public model with tuition-based classes.
- In 1989, FLSS students first participated in National Competition for Foreign Language. The program extended to Middle School levels (contribution to tuition required) the same year.
- In 1990, The President of the College of Foreign Languages officially founded the Foreign Language Specialized School based on the program. Nguyen Phu Cuong, Ph.D. became the first headmaster of FLSS (1990-1998).
- In 1992, based on the middle school level and the tuition-based high school level classes, the People's Committee of Hanoi adopted the proposal to open FLSS semi-public middle school and high school.
- In 1993, French intensive courses for first graders were first introduced.
- In 1994, FLSS was awarded the Third-degree Labor Medal from Vietnam Central Government. French intensive courses were extended to sixth graders.
- In 1995, FLSS opened its English intensive courses for first graders.
- In 1997, based on language-intensive courses for the elementary level, the People's Committee of Hanoi signed the order on the opening of Doan Thi Diem private elementary school.
- In 1998, the College of Foreign Languages designated Nguyen Thi Chi, Ph.D. as the school's first headmistress. In the same year, as the public segment of the school moved to the new area built for gifted schools, the semi-public and private schools officially separated themselves from FLSS.
- The school was awarded the Second-degree Labor Medal in 1999 and the First-degree one in 2004.
- In 2005, German and Japanese specialised classes were first opened. By this time, FLSS offered specialization in six languages: English, Russian, French, Chinese Mandarin, German, and Japanese.
- In 2007, Le Thi Chinh, Ph.D. was appointed as FLSS's second headmistress.
- In 2008, FLSS was awarded the National Labor Union Award and the Prime Minister's Honor. In September of the same year, FLSS included second foreign language training in the mandatory curriculum (in addition to their specialized foreign language, students are required to take on one assigned foreign language).
- The school celebrated its 40th anniversary in the 2009 fall semester.
- In 2009, FLSS first participated in the National Competition for Chinese Mandarin. Students also took some of the Natural Science classes in English for the first time this year.
- In 2012, Nguyen Thanh Van, Ph.D. was appointed as the next FLSS's headmaster.
- In 2017, Korean was added to the teaching program, becoming the seventh language taught at FLSS. The format of the entrance test has also been changed into multiple-choice for Maths and Natural Sciences (including Physics, Chemistry, and Biology) and the Vietnamese language and Literature, and Social Sciences (including History, Geography, and Civic Education).
- In 2020, during the COVID-19 pandemic, online schooling was employed for extended and punctuated periods.
- In 2021, the official Fandom website was added to the school’s semiofficial semiironic semiotics.

== Curriculum ==
The school offers seven foreign languages in its curriculum. Russian, English, and Mandarin Chinese were its three initial linguistic subjects before the 1980-1981 semester. French, German, Japanese were added afterwards. Korean has been taught since 2015 as a second foreign language and since 2017 as one of the primary. Students are arranged into classes specializing in one primary foreign language. Since the academic year 2008-2009, two foreign language courses (one specialized and one elective) have been required for every FLSS student. Since the academic year 2009-2010, FLSS has implemented teaching Maths through English.
