= List of high schools for the gifted in Vietnam =

In Vietnamese secondary education, high schools for the gifted or specialized high schools (trường trung học phổ thông chuyên or trường THPT chuyên) are designated public schools for secondary students to express gifted potentials in natural sciences, social sciences, and/or foreign languages. Schools for the gifted fall into two categories: provincial schools and university-affiliated schools. The first high schools for the gifted were initiated in 1966, and since then each province of Vietnam now has at least one high school for the gifted. Entrance to a high school for the gifted are based on test results and is extremely competitive.

In the early times, schools for the gifted focused on natural sciences (mostly Mathematics, followed by Physics, Chemistry, and Information technology). With the increase in competition in other fields like social sciences (History, Geography, Vietnamese literature), gifted schools nowadays are broader in terms of majors such as English, Biology, etc. Gifted schools often produce high secondary graduation rates and university entrance results, as well as numerous national and international academic prizes (including the International Science Olympiad).

== List of high schools for the gifted in Vietnam ==
As mentioned above, high schools for the gifted in Vietnam are divided into two categories: provincial and university-affiliated.

=== University-affiliated schools ===
School	Vietnamese name	Established	Affiliation	Location
HNUE High School for Gifted Students	Trường Trung học phổ thông chuyên Đại học Sư phạm	1966	Hanoi National University of Education	Cầu Giấy district, Hanoi
HUS High School for Gifted Students	Trường Trung học phổ thông chuyên Khoa học Tự nhiên	1965	VNU University of Science	Thanh Xuân district, Hanoi
Foreign Language Specialized School	Trường Trung học phổ thông chuyên Ngoại ngữ	1969	VNU University of Languages and International Studies	Cầu Giấy district, Hanoi
High School for Gifted Students in Social Sciences and Humanities	Trường Trung học phổ thông chuyên Khoa học Xã hội và Nhân văn	2019	VNU University of Social Sciences and Humanities	Thanh Xuân district, Hanoi
VNU-HCM High School for the Gifted	Trường Phổ thông Năng khiếu	1996	Vietnam National University, Ho Chi Minh City	District 5, Ho Chi Minh City
HUSC High School for Gifted Students	Trường Trung học phổ thông chuyên Khoa học Huế	1976	University of Science, Hue University	Huế, Thừa Thiên Huế province
Vinh University High School for Gifted Students,	Trường Trung học phổ thông chuyên Đại học Vinh	1966	Vinh University	Vinh, Nghệ An province

=== Local high schools for the gifted ===
The following list is sorted alphabetically by location rather than name.

School	Established	Affiliation	Location
Hanoi – Amsterdam High School	1985	Hanoi	Cầu Giấy district
Nguyễn Huệ High School for the Gifted	1947	Hanoi	Hà Đông district
Chu Văn An National High School	1908	Hanoi	Tây Hồ district
Sơn Tây High School for the Gifted	1959	Hanoi	Sơn Tây Town
Lê Hồng Phong High School for the Gifted	1927	Ho Chi Minh City	District 5
Trần Đại Nghĩa High School for the Gifted	2000	Ho Chi Minh City	District 1
Trần Phú High School for the Gifted	1986	Haiphong	Hải An district
Lê Quý Đôn High School for the Gifted	1986	Da Nang	Sơn Trà district
Lý Tự Trọng High School for the Gifted	1990	Cần Thơ	Cái Răng district
Thoại Ngọc Hầu High School for the Gifted	1948	An Giang province	Long Xuyên
Thủ Khoa Nghĩa High School for the Gifted	1950	An Giang province	Châu Đốc
Lê Quý Đôn High School for the Gifted	1991	Bà Rịa–Vũng Tàu province	Vũng Tàu
Bạc Liêu High School for the Gifted	1991	Bạc Liêu province	Bạc Liêu
Bắc Giang High School for the Gifted	1991	Bắc Giang province	Bắc Giang
Bắc Kạn High School for the Gifted	2003	Bắc Kạn province	Bắc Kạn
Bắc Ninh High School for the Gifted	1995	Bắc Ninh province	Bắc Ninh
Bến Tre High School	1990	Bến Tre province	Bến Tre
Hùng Vương High School for the Gifted	1996	Bình Dương province	Thủ Dầu Một
Lê Quý Đôn High School for the Gifted	2000	Bình Định province	Quy Nhon
Chu Văn An High School for the Gifted	2016	Bình Định province	Hoài Nhơn town
Quang Trung High School for the Gifted	2003	Bình Phước province	Đồng Xoài
Bình Long High School for the Gifted	2012	Bình Phước province	Bình Long town
Trần Hưng Đạo High School for the Gifted	1992	Bình Thuận province	Phan Thiết
Phan Ngọc Hiển High School for the Gifted	1991	Cà Mau province	Cà Mau
Cao Bằng High School for the Gifted	2001	Cao Bằng province	Cao Bằng
Nguyễn Du High School for the Gifted	1994	Đắk Lắk province	Buôn Ma Thuột
Nguyễn Chí Thanh High School for the Gifted	2013	Đắk Nông province	Gia Nghĩa
Lê Quý Đôn High School for the Gifted	1995	Điện Biên province	Điện Biên Phủ
Lương Thế Vinh High School for the Gifted	1994	Đồng Nai province	Biên Hòa
Nguyễn Quang Diêu High School for the Gifted	2011	Đồng Tháp province	Cao Lãnh
Nguyễn Đình Chiểu High School for the Gifted	2008	Đồng Tháp province	Sa Đéc
Hùng Vương Gifted High School	1993	Gia Lai province	Pleiku
Hà Giang High School for Talented Students	1995	Hà Giang province	Hà Giang
Biên Hòa High School for the Gifted	1959	Hà Nam province	Phủ Lý
Hà Tĩnh High School for the Gifted	1991	Hà Tĩnh province	Hà Tĩnh
Nguyễn Trãi High School for the Gifted	1984	Hải Dương province	Hải Dương
Vị Thanh High School for the Gifted	2008	Hậu Giang province	Vị Thanh
Hoàng Văn Thụ High School for the Gifted	1981	Hòa Bình province	Hòa Bình
Hưng Yên High School for the Gifted	1997	Hưng Yên province	Hưng Yên
Lê Quý Đôn High School for the Gifted	1985	Khánh Hòa province	Nha Trang
Huỳnh Mẫn Đạt High School for the Gifted	1990	Kiên Giang province	Rạch Giá
Nguyễn Tất Thành High School for the Gifted	1993	Kon Tum province	Kon Tum
Lê Quý Đôn High School for the Gifted	2008	Lai Châu province	Lai Châu
Chu Văn An High School for the Gifted	1988	Lạng Sơn province	Lạng Sơn
Lào Cai High School for the Gifted	2003	Lào Cai province	Lào Cai
Thăng Long High School for the Gifted	1991	Lâm Đồng province	Da Lat
Bảo Lộc High School for the Gifted	2012	Lâm Đồng province	Bảo Lộc
Long An High School for the Gifted	2009	Long An province	Tân An
Lê Hồng Phong High School for the Gifted	1920	Nam Định province	Nam Định
Phan Bội Châu High School for the Gifted	1974	Nghệ An province	Vinh
Lương Văn Tụy High School for the Gifted	1959	Ninh Bình province	Ninh Bình
Lê Quý Đôn High School for the Gifted	2008	Ninh Thuận province	Phan Rang–Tháp Chàm
Hùng Vương High School for the Gifted	1982	Phú Thọ province	Việt Trì
Lương Văn Chánh High School for the Gifted	1988	Phú Yên province	Tuy Hòa
Võ Nguyên Giáp High School for the Gifted	1996	Quảng Bình province	Đồng Hới
Lê Thánh Tông High School for the Gifted	2011	Quảng Nam province	Hội An
Nguyễn Bỉnh Khiêm High School for the Gifted	2002	Quảng Nam province	Tam Kỳ
Lê Khiết High School for the Gifted	1945	Quảng Ngãi province	Quảng Ngãi
Hạ Long High School for the Gifted	1990	Quảng Ninh province	Hạ Long
Lê Quý Đôn High School for the Gifted	1994	Quảng Trị province	Đông Hà
Nguyễn Thị Minh Khai High School for the Gifted	1996	Sóc Trăng province	Sóc Trăng
Sơn La High School for the Gifted	1995	Sơn La province	Sơn La
Hoàng Lê Kha High School for the Gifted	1994	Tây Ninh province	Tây Ninh
Thái Bình High School for the Gifted	1988	Thái Bình province	Thái Bình
Thái Nguyên Specialized High School	1988	Thái Nguyên province	Thái Nguyên
Lam Sơn High School for the Gifted	1931	Thanh Hóa province	Thanh Hóa
Quốc Học High School for the Gifted	1896	Thừa Thiên Huế province	Huế
Tiền Giang High School for the Gifted	1995	Tiền Giang province	Mỹ Tho
Nguyễn Thiện Thành High School for the Gifted	1992	Trà Vinh province	Trà Vinh
Tuyên Quang High School for the Gifted	1989	Tuyên Quang province	Tuyên Quang
Nguyễn Bỉnh Khiêm High School for the Gifted	1992	Vĩnh Long province	Vĩnh Long
Vĩnh Phúc High School for the Gifted	1990	Vĩnh Phúc province	Vĩnh Yên
Nguyễn Tất Thành High School for the Gifted	1989	Yên Bái province	Yên Bái

== List of disbanded schools ==
School	Affiliation	Location
Informatics Gifted Class	Hanoi University of Science and Technology	Hanoi
High School for the Gifted Students	Ho Chi Minh City University of Technology	Ho Chi Minh City
