= School for the Gifted =

School for the Gifted may refer to the following schools:

- School for the Gifted (Gwagwalada), a secondary school in Gwagwalada, Abuja, Nigeria
- Pine View School for the Gifted, Osprey, Florida, a public school (elementary to high school levels)
- Long Island School for the Gifted, Huntington Station, New York, a private school (pre-kindergarten to 9th grade)
- Lincoln School for the Gifted, a school for gifted but disadvantaged children from 1966 to 1970 on the campus of Lincoln Institute, Shelby County, Kentucky

== See also ==
- High School for Gifted Students, Hanoi University of Science, Hanoi, Vietnam
- High School for the Gifted, Ho Chi Minh City, Vietnam, a public high school
- Trần Đại Nghĩa High School for the Gifted, Ho Chi Minh City, Vietnam, a public high school
- Ben Tre High School for the Gifted, Ben Tre, Vietnam, a public high school
- Quốc Học – Huế High School for the Gifted, Thừa Thiên–Huế, Vietnam, a high school
- School for the Talented and Gifted, Dallas, Texas, a public secondary school
- Arkansas Governor's School, also known as Arkansas Governor's School for the Gifted and Talented, a six-week residential program for high school seniors
- Philippa Schuyler Middle School for the Gifted and Talented, New York City, New York
