= Le Quy Don High School for the Gifted =

Le Quy Don High School for the Gifted can refer to:

- Le Quy Don High School for the Gifted, Danang, a high school in Vietnam
- Le Quy Don High School for the Gifted, Vung Tau, another high school in Vietnam
