= VNU-HCM High School for the Gifted =

Coordinates: 10°45′33.4″N 106°39′58.4″E

- Trường Phổ thông Năng khiếu
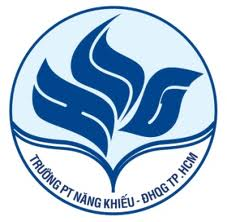

Location
- Campus 1: 153 Nguyễn Chí Thanh Street, An Đông ward Campus 2: William Shakespeare Street, Đông Hoà ward Ho Chi Minh City; Vietnam

Information
- Type: Public, University-affiliated, Co-ed
- Motto: Tôn trọng, chính trực, hợp tác (Respect, integrity, collaboration)
- Established: 1996
- Principal: Bùi Thị Hồng Hạnh
- Enrollment: ≈1,800
- Campus: Urban
- Colors: White, navy blue, azure
- Affiliation: Vietnam National University, Ho Chi Minh City
- Website: www.ptnk.edu.vn

VNU-HCM High School for the Gifted (Vietnamese: Trường Phổ thông Năng khiếu, Đại học Quốc gia Thành phố Hồ Chí Minh), commonly known by its abbreviations HSG in English and PTNK in Vietnamese, is a highly selective high school located in Ho Chi Minh City, Vietnam. It is classified as a specialized public high school.

Established in 1996, the school is affiliated with Vietnam National University, Ho Chi Minh City and is a specialized high school for students with exceptional academic capabilities in mathematics, natural sciences, literature, and foreign languages. It is considered one of the most prestigious high schools in Vietnam and one of the three most renowned specialized high schools in Ho Chi Minh City, along with Lê Hồng Phong High School and Trần Đại Nghĩa High School.

The school aims to provide a favorable environment for academic excellence and preparation for higher education, and frequently sends students to participate in regional, national, and international academic competitions, notably International Science Olympiads.

== History ==
The school was established in 1993 and was originally affiliated with the Ho Chi Minh City University of Science as the Specialized School in Mathematics and Informatics for high school students. By 1996, the school has moved to its current main campus in An Đông ward (previously District 5), expanded its programs of specialization, and become an independent high school operating directly under Vietnam National University, Ho Chi Minh City under the new name. HSG opened its second campus in VNU-HCM Complex, Đông Hòa ward (previously Thủ Đức) in 2014.

== Admissions ==
Based on performance in HSG's separate entrance examination, about 600 students total are accepted every year from more than 5000 applicants for all subjects, who hail from Ho Chi Minh City as well as Southern provinces. Specialized students receive tuition remissions, and scholarships are granted to top students in each class each semester.

== Academics ==
In addition to the national high school curriculum, HSG offers specialized instruction in seven subjects: English, Mathematics, Computer Science, Physics, Chemistry, Biology, and Literature. The school used to also admit students to non-specialized classes who seek to prepare for university entrance examinations in Groups A, A1 and B (see Higher education in Vietnam) up until 2022's admission cycle. Teachers at HSG are also professors from the various campuses of Vietnam National University. Classes at the school are known for their innovative critical and creative approaches, as well as for being highly challenging and often incorporating university-level materials.

HSG is known for its students' performance in the Vietnam University Admission Rankings, and its record in academic competitions for high school students at both national and international levels. HSG students consistently win first and second places in the National Academic Competitions, and are regularly among those selected to represent Vietnam in the International Mathematical Olympiad and the International Olympiad in Informatics.
