= Trần Ngọc Liễng =

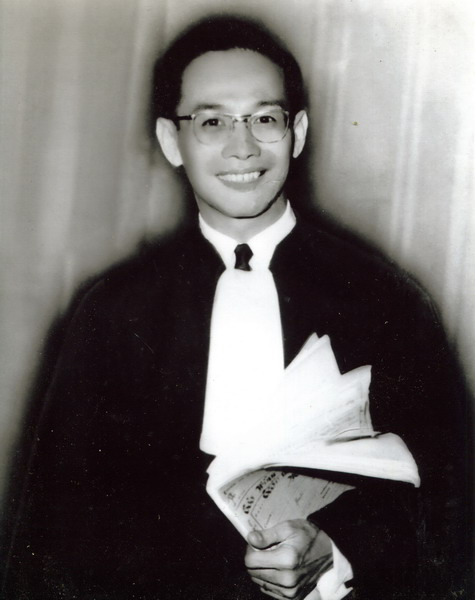
- Trần Ngọc Liễng in avocat uniform

Minister of Social Services of the Republic of Vietnam
- In office 19 June 1965 – 31 October 1966

Vice Chairman of the Vietnam Fatherland Front Committee
- In office April 1975 – February 1976

Member of the Central Committee of the Vietnam Fatherland Front
- In office February 1976 – February 1977

Delegate of the City People's Council - Head of the Legal Department of the Ho Chi Minh City People's Council
- In office February 1977 – February 1987

Bhikkhu Thích Kiến Huyền
- In office February 1987 – October 2011

Personal details
- Born: 1923 Vĩnh Long, Cochinchina
- Died: 9 October 2011 (aged 87–88) Đồng Nai, Việt Nam
- Resting place: Đồng Nai, Việt Nam

Trần Ngọc Liễng (1923 – 9 October 2011) was a Vietnamese prominent attorney-at-law and a legal scholar in Vietnam.

== Education ==
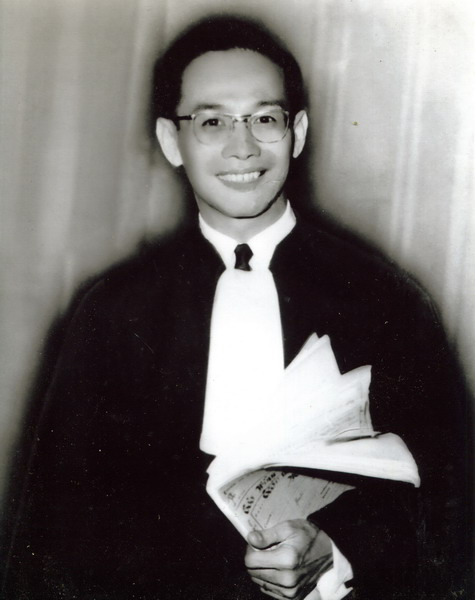
Attorney at Law - Luật Sư Trần Ngọc Liễng after graduation in the 1940s

He completed the French Preparatory School Petrus Ký with French Baccalaureate II Diploma ranking Excellent - "Mention Bien" recognition (at that time during the French colonization, there was only 1 "mention Bien" each year for the entire country & there was no "Mention Très Bien" during this era) . He attended and graduated from the French established Law School in Sàigòn (in Saigon, Viet Nam), and began his legal practice with two senior and prominent Attorney-at-Law Nguyễn Hữu Thọ and Nguyễn Lâm Sanh - former House Speaker of South Vietnam government- Chủ Tịch Hạ Nghị Viện cũa Đệ Nhất Cộng Hòa. Many of Trần classmates were successful politicians such as Prime Minister Võ Văn Kiệt, South Vietnam Chief of Justice of Supreme Court, and many other Justices & Cabinet members of various government regimes.

== Family ==
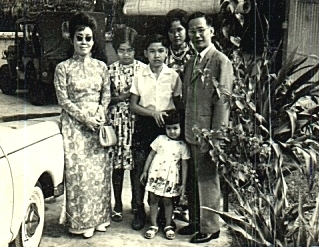
Attorney - Minister of HUD Trần Ngọc Liễng with his wife and children: daughter Mrs. Biron-Trần Ngọc Mai, son Dr. Trần Ngọc Liên, MD., daughter Mrs. Trần Ngọc Huệ, and Dr. Trần Ngọc Anh, DDS.- Photo was taken in 1966

Trần is a direct descendant / oldest son of an aristocrat family (his father was "Ông Phán/Ông Huyện Trần Văn Vỹ – "Sage Femme d’État" - Vice-Director of the General Hospital in Vĩnh Long" Vietnam). He was born in 1923 province Long Hồ, County Châu Thành, City Vĩnh Long of South Viet Nam. His mother was Lê Thị Thơm, eldest daughter of wealthy Village Chief in the Mekong Delta area in the city of Vũng Liêm. Trần is brother-in-law of South Việtnam High Ranking Navy "Flag Officer" Khương Hữu Bá that held positions of Superintendent of the South Vietnamese Naval Academy and Fourth Coastal Zone Naval Commander & Army Regiment Military Special Zone Commander. Trần was married to a well-educated lady - daughter of an aristocrat French trained Engineer- her parents are known as Mr. & Ms. Tửu from Vĩnh Long.

== Legal practice and political life ==
After graduating from law school, Tran joined the law firm of Nguyễn Hữu Thọ (later became President of ViêtNam) and Nguyen Lam Sanh (Trần and Nguyễn married the two sisters). He successfully litigated many high-profile cases at lower courts, appeal courts, and the South Vietnam Supreme Court. He gained national international recognition for defending the poor, the wrongful accused victims, and became a political icon against the corrupted South Vietnam First Republic of Ngo Dinh Diem. His brother in-law Nguyen Lam Sanh became Speaker of the House of South Vietnam under the First Republic of Ngô Đình Diệm, jointly they opposed the South Viet Nam corrupted government.

Attorney-at-Law Trần Ngọc Liễng, was well respected by US. Attorney-General Robert F. Kennedy, Vice-Presidential candidate, Minister of HUD and Social Affairs under Prime Minister Nguyễn Cao Kỳ for over half a century ago. Opposing a government that supported war time, corrupted system, and ignoring lives of the poor, Tran and the majority of the cabinet members resigned from Prime Minister Kỳ’s government.

== Declassified CIA document is as follows ==
At a meeting held at the Joint General Staff Headquarters at 1700 hours on 18 October 1966, attended by Prime Minister Nguyễn Cao Kỳ, Minister of Information and Open Arms Nguyen Bao Tri, Director General of National Police Nguyen Ngoc Loan, and III Corps Commander General Le Nguyen Khang, the decision was reached to accept the resignations which had been previously submitted by Deputy Prime Minister Nguyen Luu Vien, and the Ministers of Education, Social Welfare, Youth, Communications and Transport, Labor, and Economy. The six members of the cabinet who recently agreed to delay their resignations from the cabinet, at least until after the Manila Conference, again submitted their resignations on 17 October. In addition, Minister of Finance and Economy Au Truong Thanh has threatened to resign if the situation surrounding the arrest by Brigadier General Nguyen Ngoc Loan of the Directeur de Cabinet of the Ministry of Health is not satisfactorily resolved. Minister of Labor Nguyen Huu Hung, Minister of Education Nguyen Van Truong, Minister Tran Ngoc Lieng, and Thanh, who are members of the delegation planning to attend the Manila Conference, have threatened not to go to Manila.

During the period of 1974-75, Trần pioneered in negotiating for a Viet Nam Peace Treaty in Paris, France which is known as the "Paris Treaty". Toward the end of the conflict and immediately after the nucleus South Viet Nam government collapsed, Nguyễn Văn Thiệu, Nguyễn Cao Kỳ left Viet Nam to seek Political asylum in abroad, the government of Trần Văn Hương and followed by Dương Văn Minh resigned and surrendered, thus the war ended. Trần was pioneer in negotiating for a peaceful turn-over with intention to avoid destruction of Saigon and bloodshed of innocent people. The entire process was interviewed and recorded.

Declassified CIA documents about Vietnam war also show reports from American ambassador reporting to the Johnson and Nixon administration that "The Intellectual and Prominent Lawyer Tran Ngoc Lieng is the only hope for South Vietnam to have a free elected government that truly cares for its citizens, anything else would be a loss cause for South Vietnam".

== Life in retirement ==
After 2 decades of war, Vietnam was united between North and South. Tran was pioneered in rewriting the country laws for fairness, justice, and protection for the people of Viet Nam. After the 1990s, Trần became a full-time Buddhist monk. Trần's official Dharma name was changed to bhikkhu Thích Kiến Huyền. The remaining years of Trần was practicing the religion and philosophy of Buddha teaching with sincerest belief which is to escape the circle of life.

He died at 13:30 on 9 October 2011 at Thường Chiếu Zen Monastery, Province 1, Phước Thái village, Long Thành district, Đồng Nai, at the age of 90 years.

== Quotes ==
- "Love for your country supersedes anyone selfish love for himself."

== Books ==
- Dommen, Arthur (2002). The Indochinese Experience of the French and the Americans: Nationalism and Americans. Indianapolis, Indiana: Indiana University Press. ISBN 0253338549.
- Nguyen, Duong (2008). The Tragedy of VietNam War. Honolulu, Hawaii: MFarland. ISBN 0786432853.
- Sieg, Kent (2002). Foreign Relations of the United States, 1964–1968, Volume V: Vietnam, 1967. Washington DC: US. State Department. ISBN 016051150X.
