= District 5, Ho Chi Minh City =

District 5 Quận 5
- Urban district (obsolete)
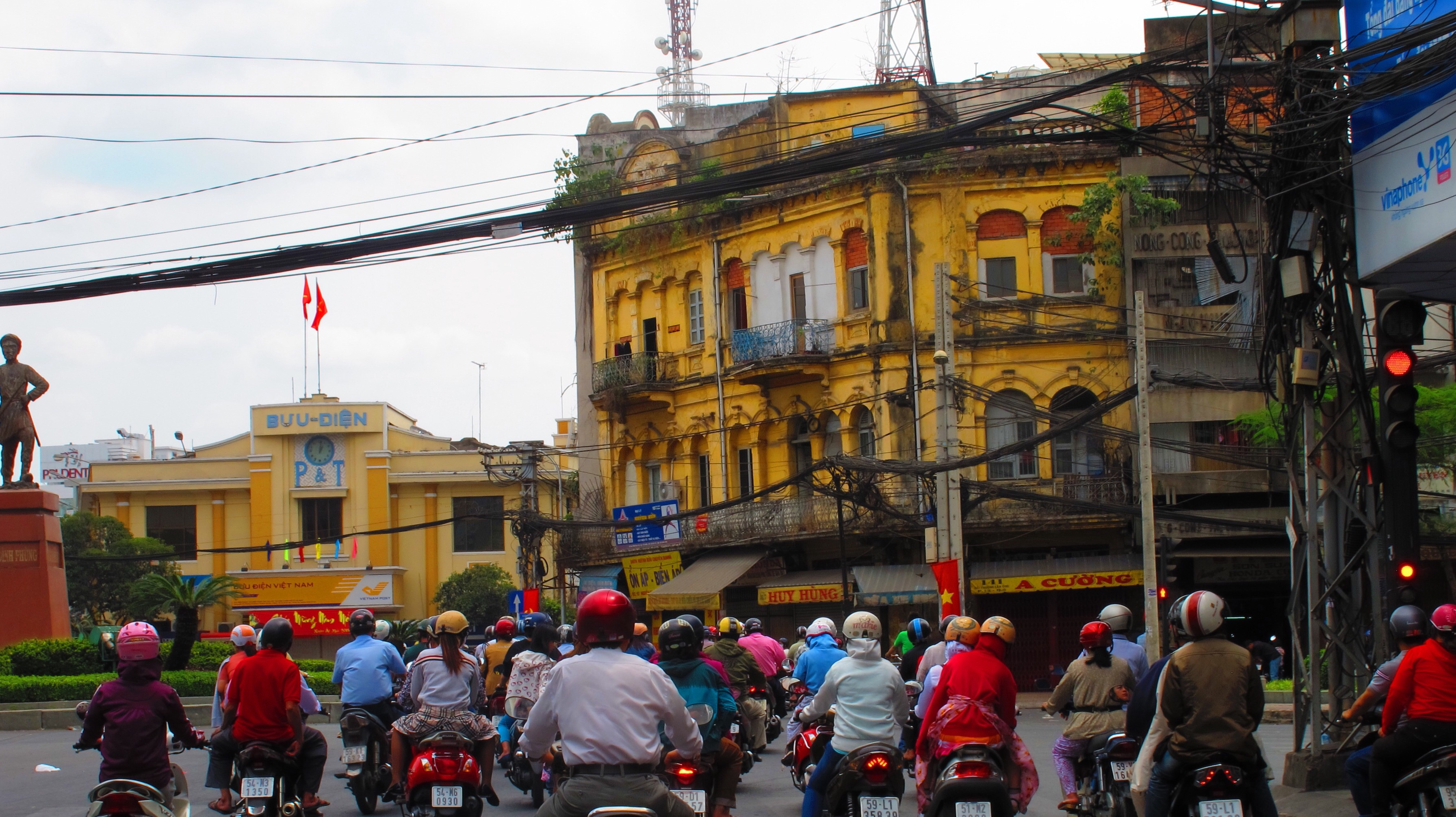
- Chợ Lớn Central Post Office, as viewed from Châu Văn Liêm St.

- District 5 in Ho Chi Minh City, prior to reforms

- Location within Vietnam
- Coordinates: 10°45′22″N 106°40′1″E
- Country: Vietnam
- Municipality: Ho Chi Minh City
- Established (under French rule): 31 August 1933
- Established (under South Vietnamese rule): 27 May 1959
- Dissolved: 1 July 2025
- Wards: 10 wards

Government
  - People's Council: Võ Tiến Sĩ
  - People's Committee: Huỳnh Thị Thảo

Area
  - Total: 4.27 km^{2} (1.65 sq mi)

Population (2018)
  - Total: 187,510
  - Density: 43,900/km^{2} (114,000/sq mi)

Demographics
  - Main ethnic groups: Kinh, Hoa, …
- Time zone: UTC+07 (ICT)
- Postal code: 70250
- Area code: 774
- Website: quan5.hochiminhcity.gov.vn

District 5 (Vietnamese: Quận 5) was an urban district (quận) of Ho Chi Minh City, the largest city in Vietnam. The district notably accounted for a significant population of Chinese people in Vietnam; hence its territorial extent still comprises a majority of Chợ Lớn quarter today.

As of 2010, District 5 had a population of 174,154 people, and covered an area of 4.27 km^{2}. District 5 was bordered by District 10 & District 11 to the north, District 8 to the south, District 1 & District 4 to the east, and District 6 to the west.

== Administrative divisions ==
Immediately prior to its dissolution, (Note: Besides the merging of 63 provinces down to 34, the 2025 Vietnamese administrative reforms notably abolished all district-level units, including urban districts, entirely.) the district was divided into 10 wards (phường), numbered: 1, 2, 4, 5, 7, 9, 11, 12, 13, and 14.

== History ==
The history of District 5 is deeply associated with the founding and development of the Chợ Lớn area, as well as the more than 300-year long history of Saigon (Ho Chi Minh City).

=== Feudal era ===
In 1623, Lord Nguyễn Phúc Nguyên (also known as Chúa Sãi / "Lord Sãi") established the "Prey Nokor tax post" (also referred to as the Sài Gòn tax post) in modern-day District 5. As such, the name "Saigon" — in the strictest sense — is said to have originally referred to District 5’s Chợ Lớn area (alongside District 1's Bến Nghé).

In 1820, the area was part of Tân Lông district, Tân Bình prefecture, Phiên An township. (Note: In this case, prefecture (phủ) and township (trấn) both refer to obsolete subdivisions which existed during Vietnam's feudal era.) By 1836, Tân Lông district eventually became a constituent division of Gia Định province, which had been established 3 years prior.

=== Under French rule ===
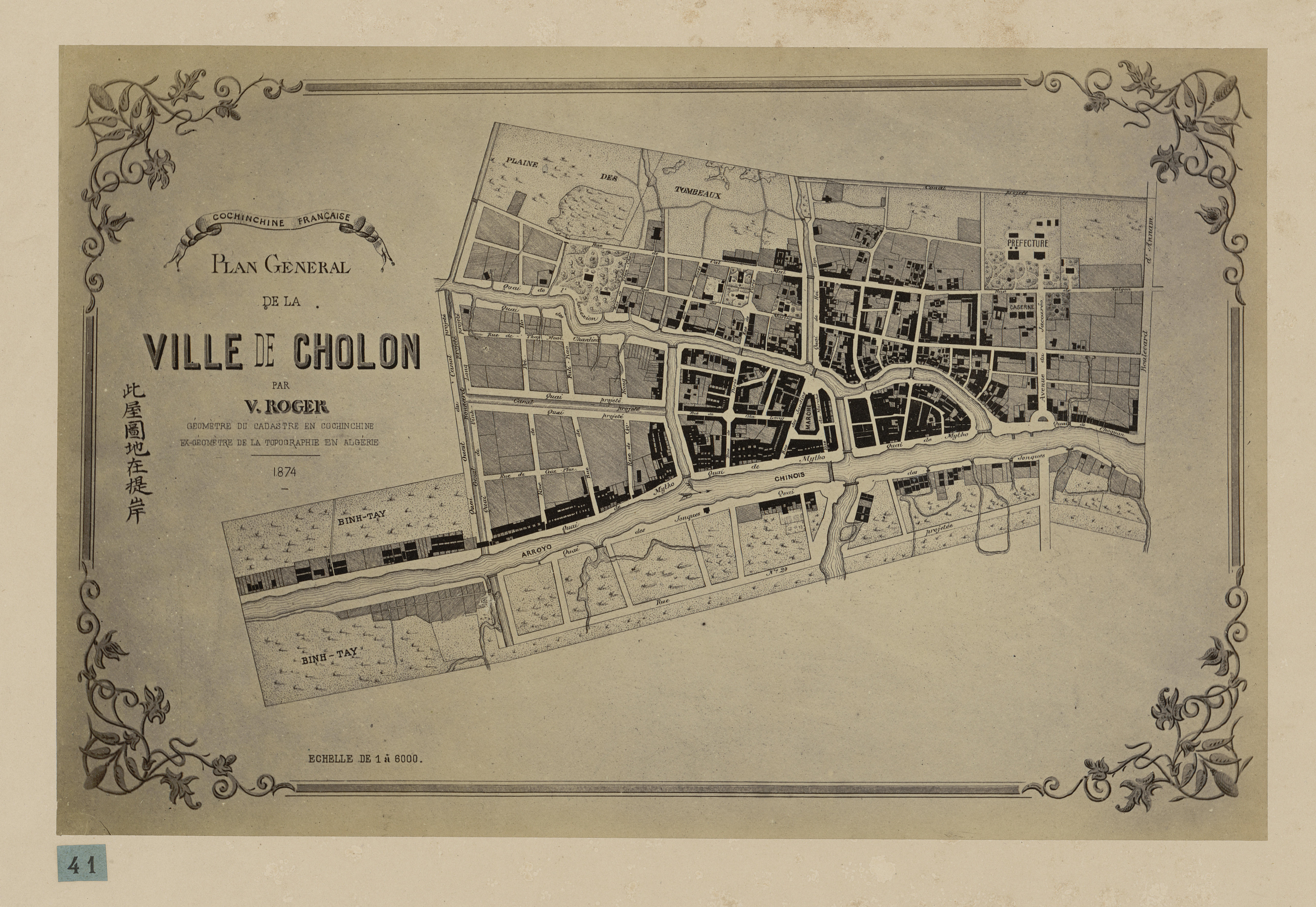
Map of the City of Chợ Lớn (Ville de Cholon), 1874

On 6 June 1865, a minuscule part of modern-day District 5 was part of the city of Chợ Lớn, which was established following a decree ratified by Pierre-Paul de La Grandière (then interim Governor of Cochinchina), on the territories of numerous villages situated in 3 cantons: Tân Phong Thượng, Tân Phong Trung, and Tân Phong Hạ – all of which were then part of the Tân Long district, Tân Bình prefecture of Gia Định province.

On 27 April, 1931, the French president signed a decree merging the cities of Saigon and Chợ Lớn into a new division, named the "Sài Gòn-Chợ Lớn Area" (Région Saigon - Cholon).

On the 31 August 1933, the French established the historic "District 5" under the Sài Gòn-Chợ Lớn Area, which then encompassed the entirety of pre-1931 Chợ Lớn City (modern-day Districts 5, 6, and 11 of Ho Chi Minh City).

On 30 June 1951, the Prime Minister of the State of Vietnam signed Decree No. 311-cab/SG, renaming the "Sài Gòn - Chợ Lớn Area" to the "Sài Gòn - Chợ Lớn Capital City" (Đô thành Sài Gòn-Chợ Lớn).

=== Under South Vietnamese rule ===
The administrative boundaries of District 5 prior to and after 1959 were, evidently, completely different to one another.

A series of reforms were enacted by South Vietnamese president Ngô Đình Diệm on the 27th of March, 1959 under Resolution No. 110-NV on dividing the existing 6 districts of Sài Gòn into 8 new districts, now consisting of: 1 (Nhứt), 2 (Nhì), 3, 4 (Tư), 5, 6, 7, and 8. Excluding districts 1-3, all other districts were renamed and their administrative boundaries altered accordingly.

At this point, the newly-established, post-1959 District 5's boundaries overlapped with that of the archaic, pre-1959 District 7 and District 4, north of the Tàu Hủ Channel. District 5 then had 6 wards of its own: An Đông, Chợ Quán, Trung Ương, and Minh Mạng.

In 1962, Trung Ương Ward was dissolved in favor of 5 new wards: Đồng Khánh, Hồng Bàng, Khổng Tử, Nguyễn Huỳnh Đức and Trang Tử; District 5 was now divided into 10 wards.

In 1969, parts of districts 3, 5, and 6 were divided amongst each other to form the newly-established District 10 with 4 wards; this reduced the number of wards in District 5 from 10 to 7.

Following the establishment of the final, eighth ward: Nguyễn Trải in 1974, District 5 would maintain the current number of wards until the 29th of April, 1975 (An Đông, Chợ Quán, Đồng Khánh, Hồng Bàng, Khổng Tử, Nguyễn Huỳnh Đức, Nguyễn Trãi, and Trang Tử).

=== From 1975 to 2025 ===
After the Provisional Revolutionary Government of the Republic of South Vietnam took over "Saigon Capital City" (which they'd renamed to "Sài Gòn-Gia Định") on the 30 April 1975, reforms were simultaneously made across several districts whose wards had populations / sizes deemed "too little"; one of them being District 5, where wards Hồng Bàng and Khổng Tủ were merged into Nguyễn Trải and Trang Tử, respectively. This narrowed the number of wards down to 6.

On 20 May 1976, however, the administrative body of Sài Gòn-Gia Định (modern-day Ho Chi Minh City) notably changed course by undergoing a second period of administrative reforms (under Resolution No. 301/UB) which lead to the dissolution of all of District 5's 6 former wards in favor of 24 new wards, numbered '1' to '24'.

On the 26th of April, 1986, under Decision No. 51-HĐBT of the Council of Ministers, District 5's 24 wards were once again rearranged to form 15, which included the following changes:

- The merging of wards 19 and 20, to form 'Ward 1'.
- The dissolving of wards 21, 22, 23, and 24 to form wards '2', '3', and '4'.
- The merging of wards 17 and 18, to form 'Ward 5'.
- The dissolving of wards 13, 14, and 16 to form wards '6' and '7'.
- The dissolving of wards 11, 12, and 15 to form wards '8' and '9'.
- The dissolving of wards 7, 8, and 9 to form wards '10' and '11'.
- The dissolving of wards 1, 2, 3, 4, 5, 6, and 10 to form wards '12', '13', '14', and '15'.

On 9 December 2020, the Standing Committee of the National Assembly passed Resolution No. 1111/NQ-UBTVQH14 (effective on 1 January 2021), merging District 5's Ward 15 into Ward 12.

On 14 November 2024, the Standing Committee of the National Assembly further passed Resolution No. 1278/NQ-UBTVQH15 (effective on 1 January, 2025), merging wards 3, 6, 8, and 10 into 2, 5, 7, and 11, respectively.

On 16 June 2025, the Standing Committee of the National Assembly — as part of the 2025 Vietnamese administrative reforms — ratified Resolution No. 1685/NQ-UBTVQH15 (effective on 1 July 2025), which was set to dissolve all district-level subdivisions (including urban districts and District 5), as well as enact the following changes locally:

- (The dissolution of District 5 as a whole)
- The merging of wards 5, 7, and 9 to form the newly-established An Đông ward.
- The merging of wards 11, 12, 13, and 14 to form the newly-established Chợ Lớn ward.
- The merging wards 1, 2, and 4 to form the newly-established Chợ Quán ward.

== Culture & tourism ==
=== Idioms ===
4 notable idioms related to District 5 exist in Vietnamese literature:

- "Ăn Quận 5, nằm Quận 3, xa hoa Quận 1, trấn lột Quận Tư." (lit. 'Eat in District 5, sleep in District 3, live lavishly in District 1, get robbed in District 4.')
- "Giao thừa ra Quận Nhất, Nguyên Tiêu về Quận 5." (lit. 'Head to District 1 for New Year's Eve, and return to District 5 for the Lantern Festival.')
- "Quận 5 lộng lẫy dáng hào hoa." (lit. 'District 5's magnificent, graceful charm')
- "Sài Gòn có ông bánh bao, Quận 5 có bà há cảo." (lit. 'Sài Gòn has the bánh bao grampy, District 5 has the há cảo granny.')

=== Notable cuisine / dishes ===
- Roasted duck, more specifically Peking duck
- Steamed buns, more specifically multi-colored buns & Cả Cần steamed buns.
- Dim sum, consisting of dishes such as har gow (蝦餃; há cảo), shuijiao (水餃; sủi cảo), and wontons (雲吞; hoành thánh) (Note: Vietnamese terms for the 3 dishes mentioned originate from the Cantonese reading of the name, as opposed to its Sino-Vietnamese reading. (In which case, the dishes would've been referred to as 'hà giáo', 'thủy giáo' and 'vân thôn', respectively.))
- "Lão Mã" salt-steamed chicken
- Satay venison hủ tiếu (rice noodle soup)
- Stir-fried Hokkien noodles (Note: Main ingredient may consist of beef, shrimp, seafood, etc. Also includes crispy-fried noodles, soft-fried noodles and braised duck egg noodles (mì vịt tiềm).)
- Stinky tofu
- Steamed chicken feet, often braised with fermented soybean paste.
- Buddha Jumps Over the Wall
- Varieties of chè: black sesame chè (chè mè đen), tea egg chè (chè trứng hồng trà), papaya chè (chè đu đủ tiềm), tangyuan, almond tofu, guilinggao, Hong Kong–style milk tea, etc.

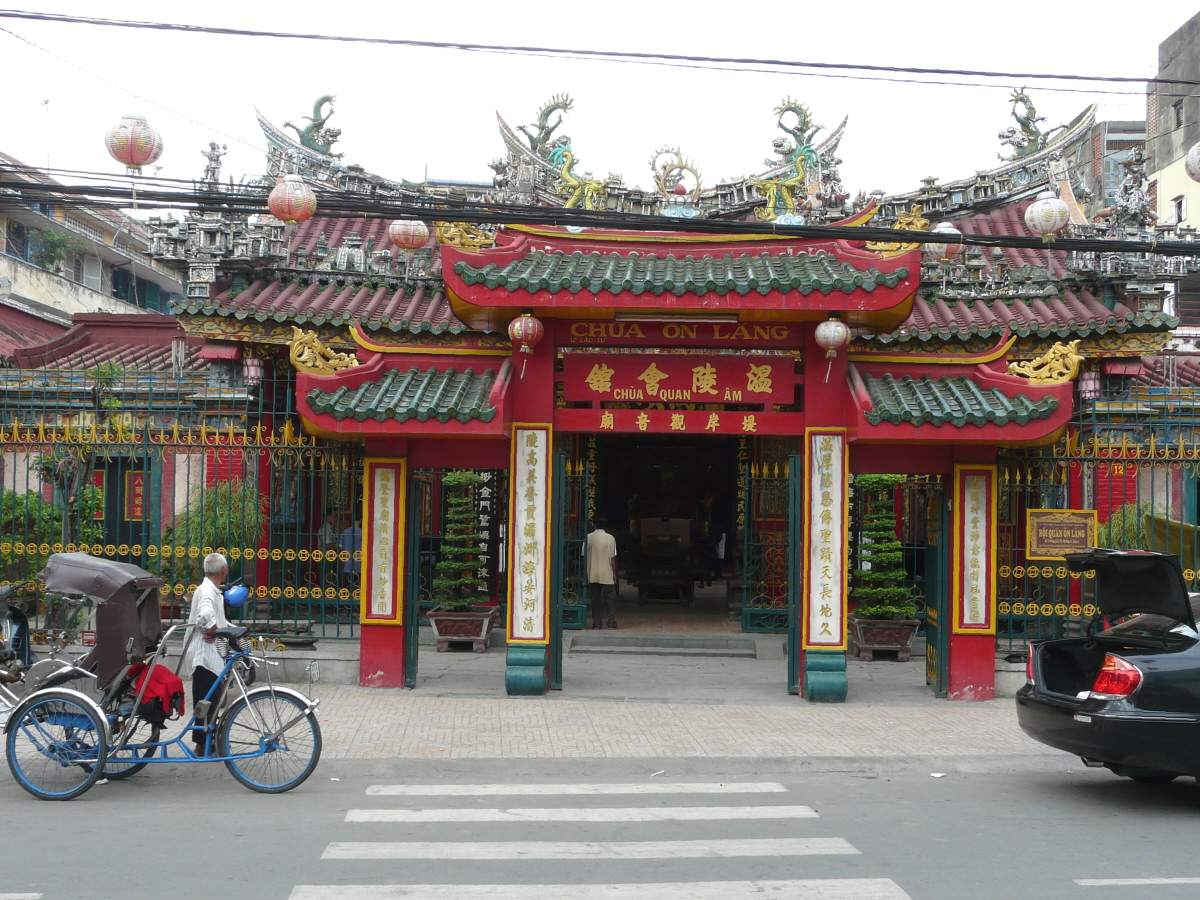
Ôn Lăng Assembly Hall

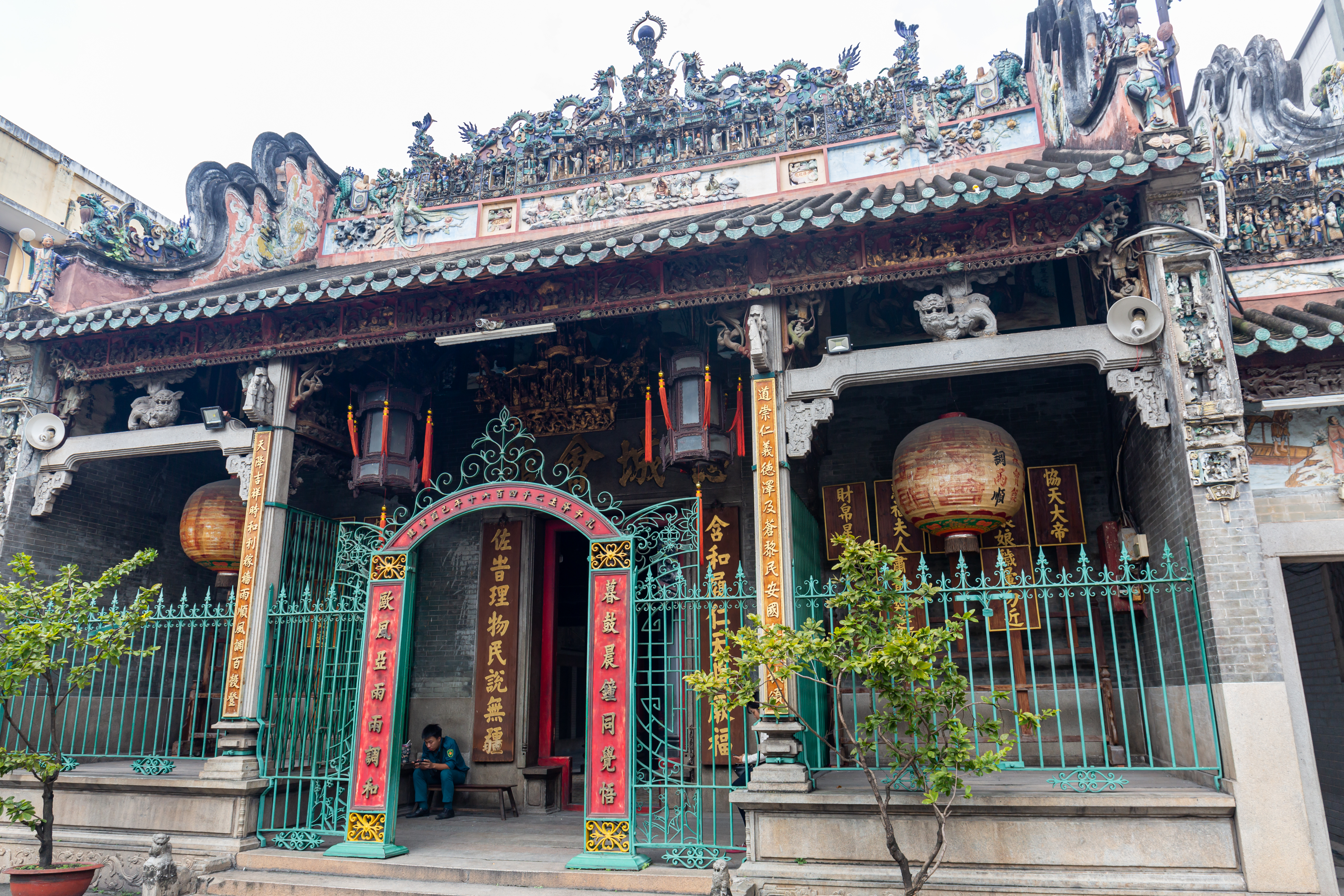
Thien Hau Temple of Cholon

=== Historical and architectural sites ===
Architecture of historical significance are prevalent across District 5, and are often religious sites / places of worship.

==== National relics ====
Name	Address	Notes
Minh Hương Gia Thạnh Communal House (Đình Minh Hương Gia Thạnh)	380 Trần Hưng Đạo, Ward 11	
Chợ Quán Hospital Detention Camp (Khu trại giam Bệnh viện Chợ Quán)	190 Hàm Tử, Ward 1	Prominent for being the place of confinement of revolutionary Trần Phú.
No. 5 Châu Văn Liêm ("Uncle Hồ's House")	5 Châu Văn Liêm, Ward 14	Former residence of Hồ Chí Minh (also known as by his other alias, Nguyễn Tất Thành) in Saigon, prior to his journey of "setting out to find a path to national salvation" in 1911.
Hà Chương Assembly Hall (Hội quán Hà Chương)	802 Nguyễn Trãi, Ward 14	Places of worship
Lệ Châu Assembly Hall (Hội quán Lệ Châu)	586 Trần Hưng Đạo, Ward 14	Places of worship
Ôn Lăng Assembly Hall (Hội quán Ôn Lăng)	12 Lão Tử, Ward 11	Places of worship
Nghĩa An Assembly Hall (Hội quán Nghĩa An)	676 Nguyễn Trãi, Ward 11	Places of worship
Nghĩa Nhuận Assembly Hall (Hội quán Nghĩa Nhuận)	27 Phan Văn Khỏe, Ward 13	Places of worship
Nhị Phủ Assembly Hall (Hội quán Nhị Phủ)	264 Hải Thượng Lãn Ông, Ward 14	Places of worship
Quỳnh Phủ Assembly Hall (Hội quán Quỳnh Phủ)	276 Trần Hưng Đạo B, Ward 11	Places of worship
Thien Hau Temple of Cholon (Miếu Thiên Hậu)	710 Nguyễn Trãi, Ward 11	Places of worship

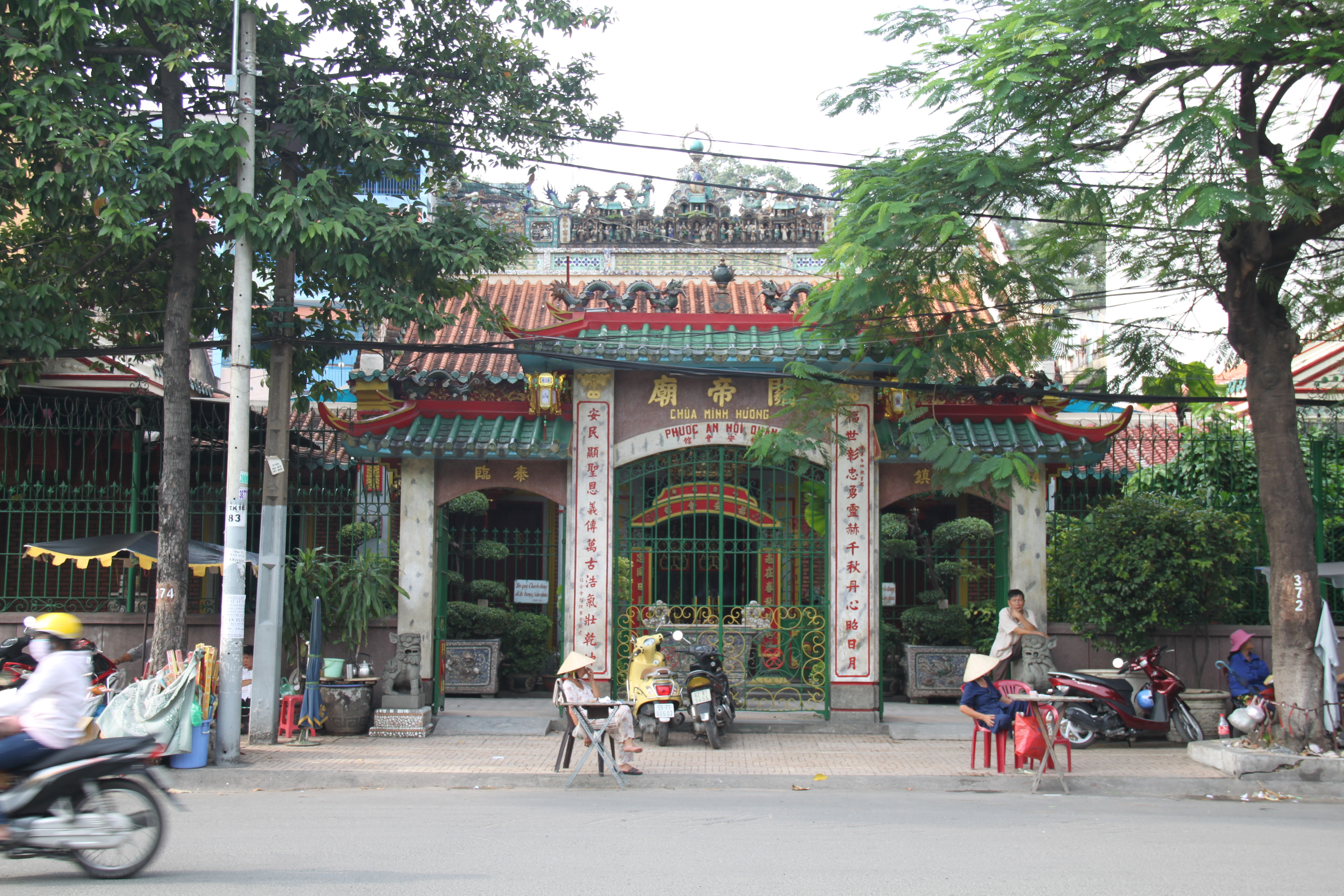
Phước An Assembly Hall

==== City-level relics ====
Name	Address	Notes
Thiên Tôn Pagoda (Chùa Thiên Tôn)	117/3/2 An Bình, Ward 5	
Tân Kiểng Pagoda (Đình Tân Kiểng)	718 Trần Hưng Đạo, Ward 2	
Phước An Assembly Hall (Hội quán Phước An)	184 Hồng Bàng, Ward 12	Also known as "Minh Hương Pagoda"
Lý Family Ancestral House (Từ đường họ Lý)	292 Hải Thượng Lãn Ông, Ward 14	
Hokkien Ancestral House (Từ đường Phúc Kiến)	314 Nguyễn Trãi, Ward 7	Located within Nguyễn Trãi Hospital

=== Tourism ===
District 5 is said to best attract tourists during celebratory events such as the Lantern Festival and the Mid-Autumn Festival.

Well-known activities among tourists in District 5 consist of: watching lion / dragon dances, martial arts performances (often performed using a variety of weapons), musical performance variety shows, directly participating in cultural practices such as releasing sky lanterns (Note: Other lantern-related activities include: hanging lanterns, lantern riddles, lantern auctions, etc.), putting fai chun, visiting religious temples / pagodas, writing traditional calligraphy, etc.

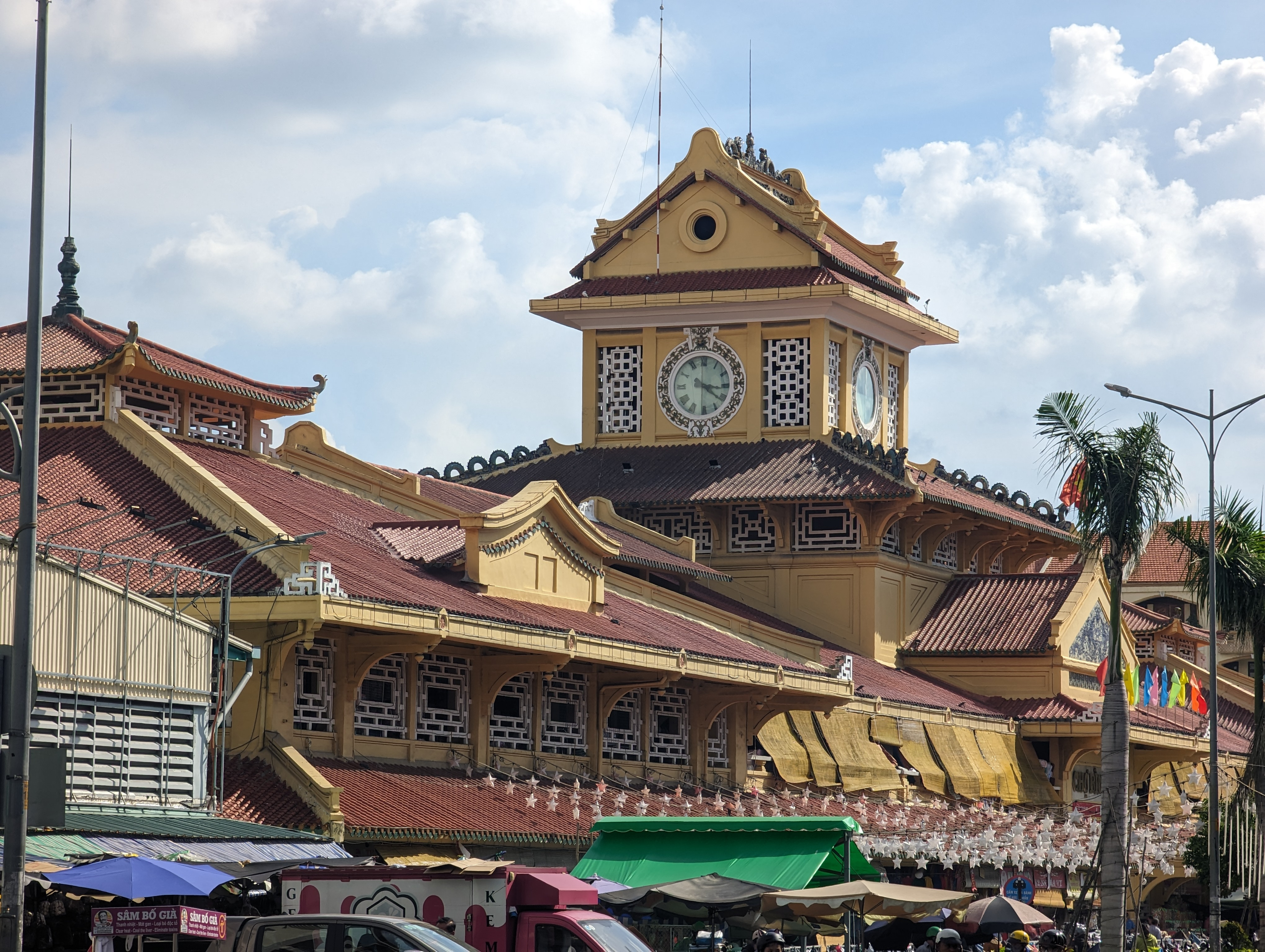
Bình Tây Market

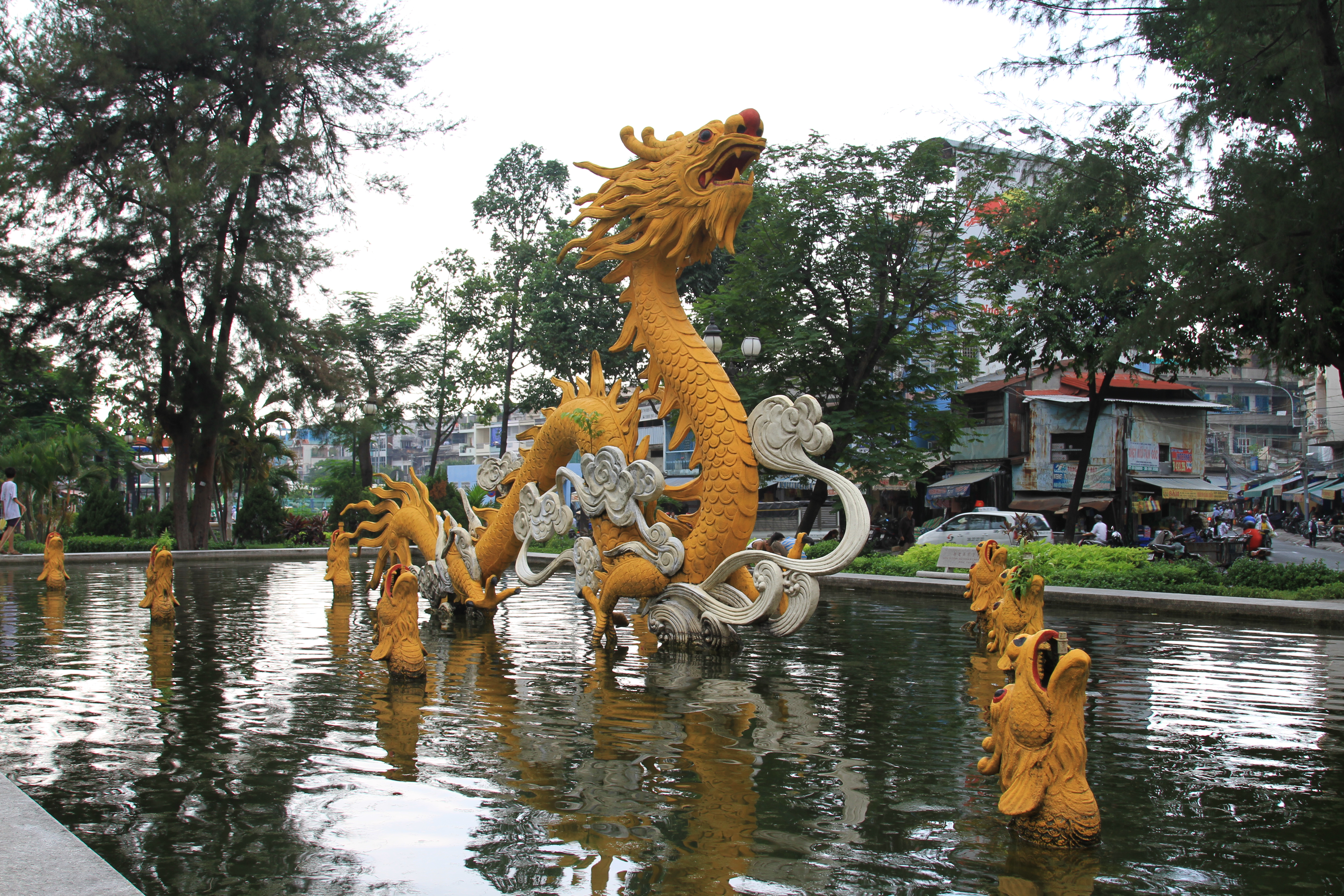
Thăng Long Park

==== Famous landmarks ====
Name	Address	Website
An Đông Market (Chợ An Đông)	34–36 An Dương Vương, Ward 9	
Bình Tây Market (Chợ Bình Tây)	57A Tháp Mười, Ward 2	
Kim Biên Market (Chợ Kim Biên)	37 Vạn Tượng, Ward 13	
Văn Lang Park (Công viên Văn Lang)	238 An Dương Vương, Ward 9	
Thăng Long Park (Công viên Thăng Long)	Hải Thượng Lãn Ông St., Ward 13	
Windsor Plaza Hotel	18 An Dương Vương, Ward 9	
Hải Thượng Lãn Ông Old Street(Khu phố cổ Hải Thượng Lãn Ông)	Hải Thượng Lãn Ông St. (Note: Spans across wards 10, 13, and 14. (modern-day Chợ Lớn ward))	
Hào Sĩ Phường Alley	206 Trần Hưng Đạo, Ward 11	
District 5 Cultural Center (Trung tâm Văn hóa Quận 5)	105 Trần Hưng Đạo, Ward 5	

== Health ==
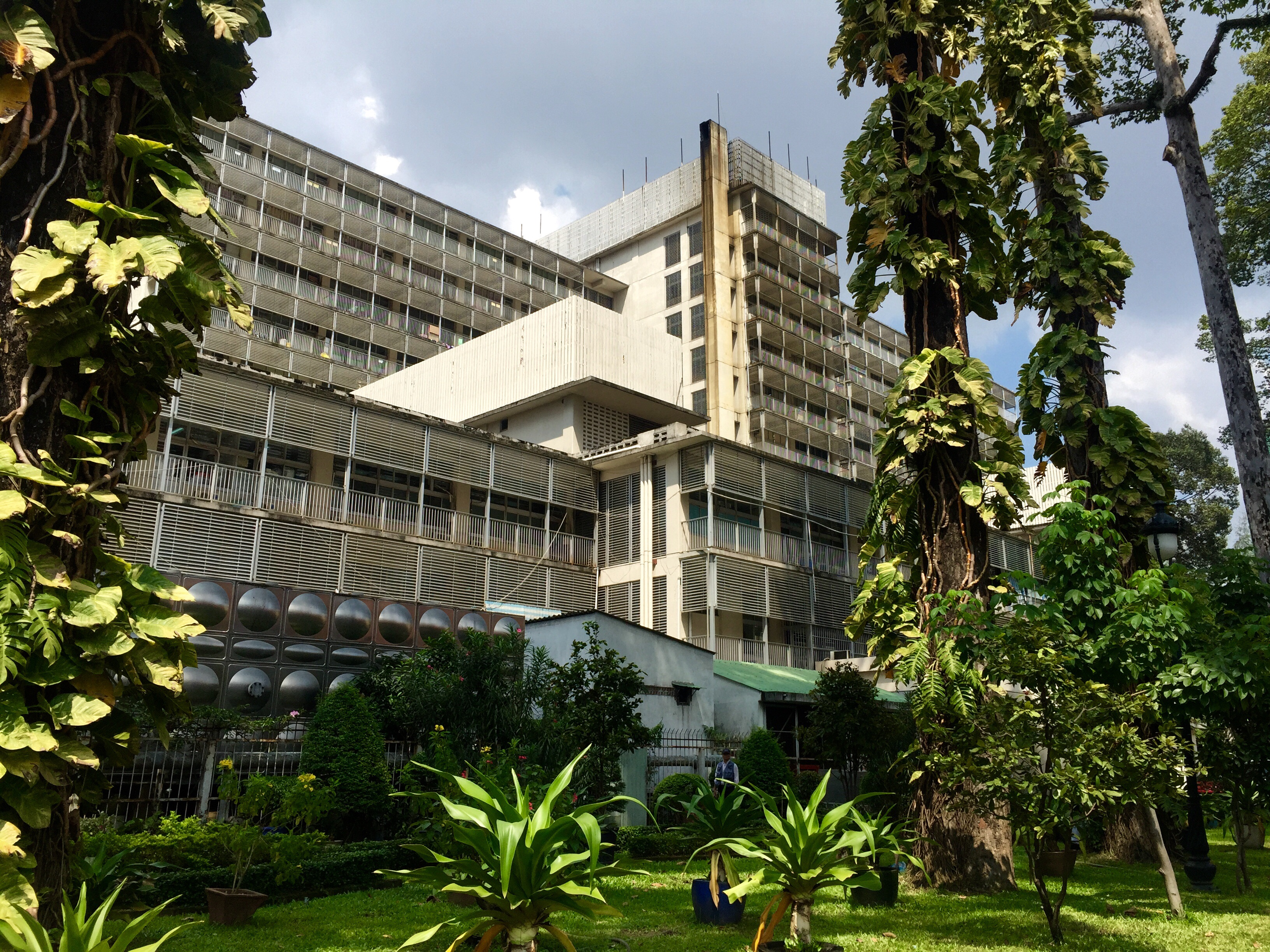
Chợ Rẫy Hospital

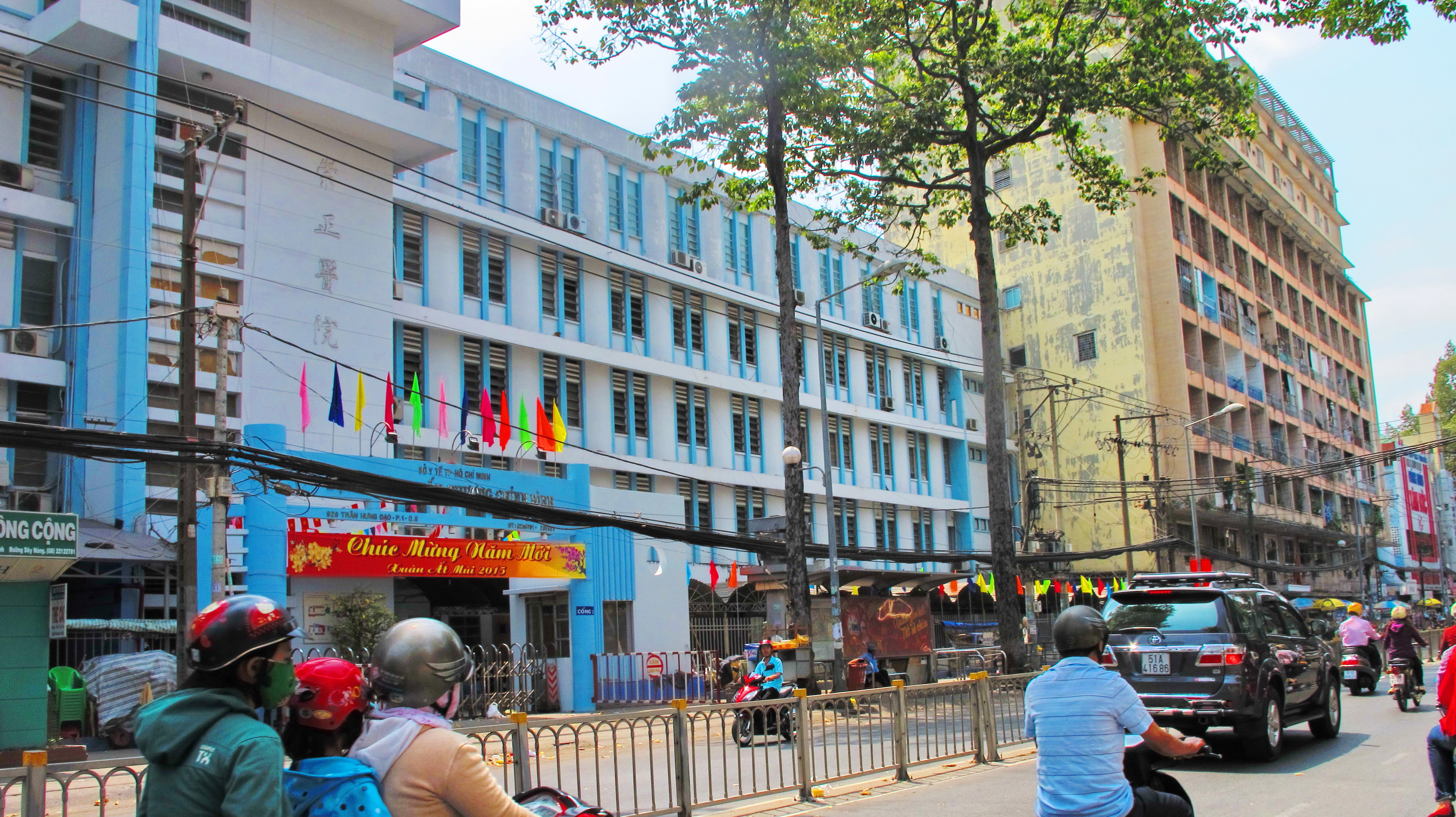
Hospital for Traumatology & Orthopedics

District 5 has a plethora of healthcare institutes, some of which vary in size.

Name of hospital	Address	Notes
An Bình Hospital (An Bình Hospital)	146 An Bình, Ward 7	
Hospital for Tropical Diseases (HTD) (Bệnh viện Bệnh Nhiệt đới)	764 Võ Văn Kiệt, Ward 1	
Hospital for Traumatology & Orthopedics (Bệnh viện Chấn thương Chỉnh hình)	929 Trần Hưng Đạo, Ward 1	
Chợ Rẫy Hospital (Bệnh viện Chợ Rẫy)	201B Nguyễn Chí Thanh, Ward 12	
University of Medicine & Pharmacy Hospital (Bệnh viện Đại học Y Dược Thành phố Hồ Chí Minh)	215 Hồng Bàng, Ward 11	Campus 1
University of Medicine & Pharmacy Hospital (Bệnh viện Đại học Y Dược Thành phố Hồ Chí Minh)	201 Nguyễn Chí Thanh, Ward 12	Campus 2
Đức Khang Hospital (Bệnh viện Đức Khang)	500 Ngô Gia Tự, Ward 9	Gate 1
Đức Khang Hospital (Bệnh viện Đức Khang)	129A Nguyễn Chí Thanh, Ward 9	Gate 2
Hùng Vương Hospital (Bệnh viện Hùng Vương)	128 Hồng Bàng, Ward 12	
Nguyễn Trãi Hospital (Bệnh viện Nguyễn Trãi)	314 Nguyễn Trãi, Ward 7	
Nguyễn Tri Phương Hospital (Bệnh viện Nguyễn Tri Phương)	468 Nguyễn Trãi, Ward 7	
Phạm Ngọc Thạch (Bệnh viện Phạm Ngọc Thạch)	120 Hồng Bàng, Ward 12	
District 5 Hospital (Bệnh viện Quận 5)	642A Nguyễn Trãi, Ward 11	
National Hospital of Odonto-Stomatology (NHOS) (Bệnh viện Răng Hàm Mặt Trung ương Thành phố Hồ Chí Minh)	201A Nguyễn Chí Thanh, Ward 12	
Blood Transfusion and Hermatology Hospital (BTH) (Bệnh viện Truyền máu - Huyết học Thành phố Hồ Chí Minh)	118 Hồng Bàng, Ward 12	

== Education ==
=== Higher education ===
==== Universities & pre-universities ====
Name of institution	Address	Website	Notes
Pre-University of Ho Chi Minh City (Trường Dự bị đại học Thành phố Hồ Chí Minh)	91 Nguyễn Chí Thanh, Ward 9		
Hùng Vương University, Ho Chi Minh City (Trường Đại học Hùng Vương Thành phố Hồ Chí Minh)	736 Nguyễn Trãi, Ward 11		Main campus
Hùng Vương University, Ho Chi Minh City (Trường Đại học Hùng Vương Thành phố Hồ Chí Minh)	28–30 Ngô Quyền, Ward 5		Campus 1
National University – Ho Chi Minh City University of Science (Trường Đại học Khoa học Tự nhiên, Đại học Quốc gia Thành phố Hồ Chí Minh)	227 Nguyễn Văn Cừ, Ward 4		Campus 1
Saigon University (Trường Đại học Sài Gòn)	273 An Dương Vương, Ward 2		Main campus
Ho Chi Minh City University of Education (HCMUE) (Trường Đại học Sư phạm Thành phố Hồ Chí Minh)	280 An Dương Vương, Ward 4		Main campus
Ho Chi Minh City University of Physical Education and Sport (UPES) (Trường Đại học Sư phạm Thể dục Thể thao Thành phố Hồ Chí Minh)	639 Nguyễn Trãi, Ward 11		Main campus
Ho Chi Minh City University of Medicine and Pharmacy (UMP) (Trường Đại học Y Dược Thành phố Hồ Chí Minh)	217 Hồng Bàng, Ward 11		Main campus

==== Colleges & vocational schools ====
Name of institution	Address	Website	Notes
College of Foreign Economic Relations (COFER) (Trường Cao đẳng Kinh tế Đối ngoại)	81 Trần Bình Trọng, Ward 1		District 5 Campus
VOV II College (Trường Cao đẳng Phát thanh - Truyền hình II)	75 Trần Nhân Tôn, Ward 9		Campus 1
Hùng Vương Technology Vocational School (Trường Trung cấp nghề Kỹ thuật công nghệ Hùng Vương)	161–165 Nguyễn Chí Thanh, Ward 12		

=== High schools (Trung học phổ thông), escalator schools offering high school education ===
Name of institution	Address	Website	Notes
VNU-HCM High School for the Gifted (Trường Phổ thông Năng khiếu, Đại học Quốc gia Thành phố Hồ Chí Minh)	153 Nguyễn Chí Thanh, Ward 9		
Lê Hồng Phong High School for the Gifted (Trường THPT chuyên Lê Hồng Phong)	235 Nguyễn Văn Cừ, Ward 4		
Hùng Vương High School (Trường THPT Hùng Vương)	124 Hồng Bàng, Ward 12		
Trần Hữu Trang High School (Trường THPT Trần Hữu Trang)	276 Trần Hưng Đạo B, Ward 11		
Trần Khai Nguyên High School (Trường THPT Trần Khai Nguyên)	225 Nguyễn Tri Phương, Ward 9		
Saigon Practical High School (Trường Trung học Thực hành, Trường Đại học Sài Gòn)	220 Trần Bình Trọng, Ward 4		
HCMUE Practical High School (Trường Trung học Thực hành, Trường Đại học Sư phạm TP. Hồ Chí Minh)	280 An Dương Vương, Ward 4		
Nguyễn Bỉnh Khiêm Secondary & High School (Trường THCS-THPT Nguyễn Bỉnh Khiêm)	28-30 Ngô Quyền, Ward 5		
Quang Trung - Nguyễn Huệ Secondary & High School (Trường THCS-THPT Quang Trung - Nguyễn Huệ)	223 Nguyễn Tri Phương, Ward 9		Nguyễn Tri Phương Campus

=== Secondary schools (Trung học cơ sở) ===
The following list does not include escalator schools offering high school education.

Name of institution	Established in	Address	Website
Trần Bội Cơ Secondary School (Trường THCS Trần Bội Cơ)	1908	266 Hải Thượng Lãn Ông, Ward 14	
Hồng Bàng Secondary School (Trường THCS Hồng Bàng)		132 Hồng Bàng, Ward 12	
Ba Đình Secondary School (Trường THCS Ba Đình)		129 Phan Văn Trị, Ward 2	
Kim Đồng Secondary School (Trường THCS Kim Đồng)		503 Phan Văn Trị, Ward 7	
Mạch Kiếm Hùng Secondary School (Trường THCS Mạch Kiếm Hùng)		712 Nguyễn Trãi, Ward 11	
Lý Phong Secondary School (Trường THCS Lý Phong)		83 Nguyễn Duy Dương, Ward 9	

=== Primary schools (Trường tiểu học) ===
Name of institution	Address	Website
Lê Đình Chinh Primary School (Trường Tiểu học Lê Đình Chinh)	8-15 Vạn Tượng, Ward 13	
Hùng Vương Primary School (Trường Tiểu học Hùng Vương)	266 Hồng Bàng, Ward 15	
Lý Cảnh Hớn Primary School (Trường Tiểu học Lý Cảnh Hớn)	2 Xóm Chỉ, Ward 10	
Chính Nghĩa Primary School (Trường Tiểu học Chính Nghĩa)	676 Nguyễn Trãi, Ward 14	
Minh Đạo Primary School (Trường Tiểu học Minh Đạo)	15 Ký Hòa, Ward 11	
Nguyễn Viết Xuân Primary School (Trường Tiểu học Nguyễn Viết Xuân)	768 Nguyễn Trãi, Ward 11	
Nguyễn Đức Cảnh Primary School (Trường Tiểu học Nguyễn Đức Cảnh)	25 Học Lạc, Ward 14	
Trần Quốc Toản Primary School (Trường Tiểu học Trần Quốc Toản)	292 Trần Phú, Ward 8	
Phạm Hồng Thái Primary School (Trường Tiểu học Phạm Hồng Thái)	38 Nguyễn Duy Dương, Ward 8	
