= Lê Quý Đôn High School for the Gifted, Vũng Tàu =

Le Quy Don High School for the Gifted
- Trường Trung học phổ thông chuyên Lê Quý Đôn

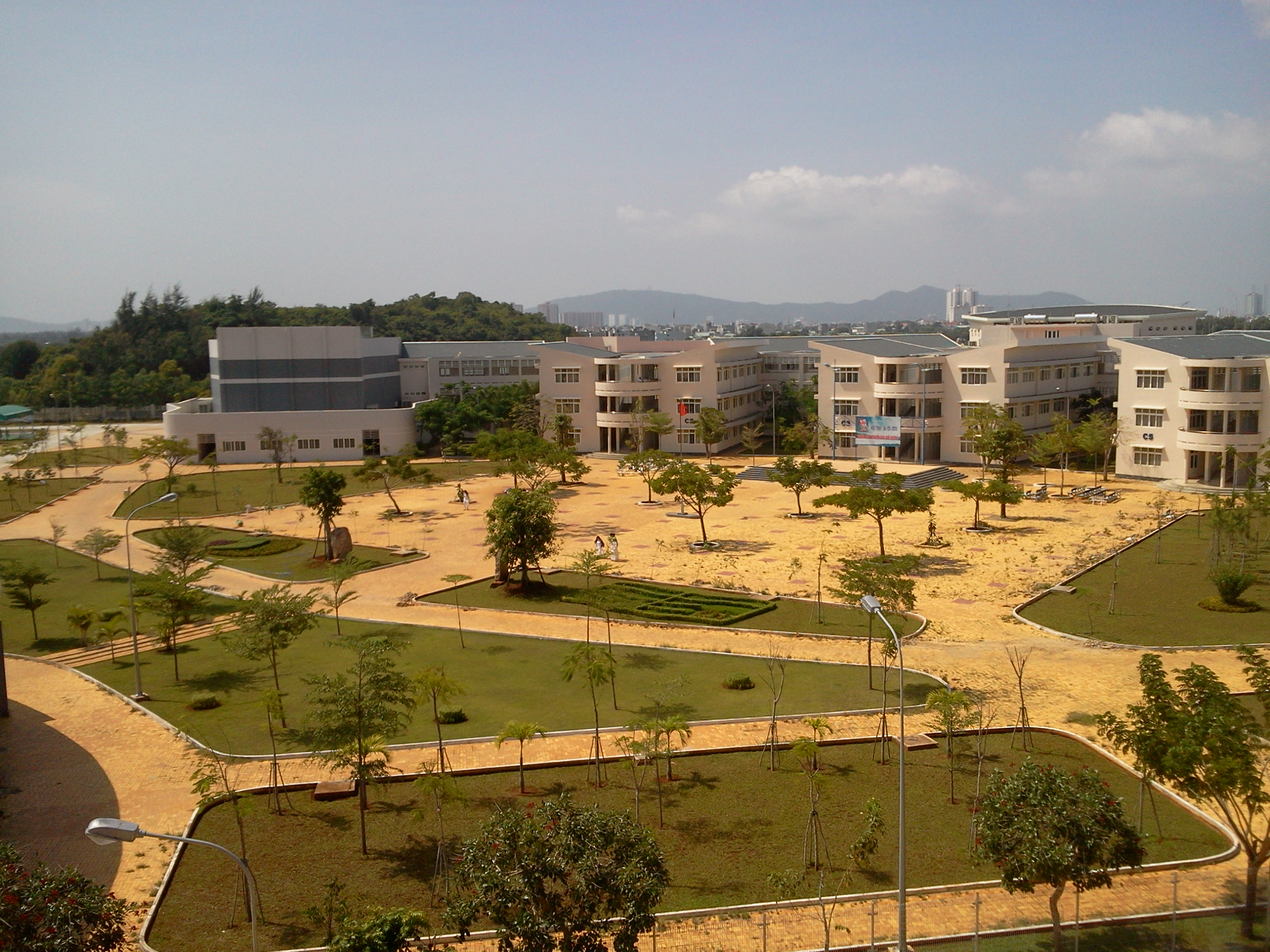
- Campus, 2013

Location
- 3/2 Street, Ward 11; Vung Tau, Ba Ria-Vung Tau; Vietnam
- Coordinates: 10.3904°N 107.1341°E

Information
- Type: Public
- Established: 19 August 1991
- Category: High school for the gifted
- Principal: Lữ Thị Trà Giang
- Grades: 10-12
- Enrollment: 1,000
- Accreditation: First Labor Order

Le Quy Don High School for the Gifted (Vietnamese: Trường Trung học phổ thông chuyên Lê Quý Đôn) is a designated high school for the gifted in Vung Tau, Vietnam. Established on 19 August 1991, the school is specialized for gifted students who possess interest and talent in the Natural Sciences, Social Sciences, or Foreign Language.

The school is the only gifted high school in Ba Ria - Vung Tau.

== History ==
In December 1988, the Department of Education and Training of Ba Ria-Vung Tau Province initiated a project for middle school for the gifted in two majors: Literature and Mathematics. For the school year 1990-1991, the Chairman of the People's Committee of Vung Tau-Con Dao Special Administrative Region established Le Quy Don High School for the Gifted, with the campus located at 58 Tran Hung Dao Street, Ward 1, Vung Tau city.

In July 2009, the People's Committee of Ba Ria-Vung Tau Province initiated a plan to relocate the school's campus from a small area on Tran Hung Dao Street to a much larger area of 9 hectares on 3/2 Street, Ward 11. After two years of construction, the new campus officially came into effect in November 2011, with better-equipped infrastructure and learning environment. In August 2016, in commemoration of the school's 25-year span of history, Le Quy Don High School for the Gifted was awarded the Second Labor Order from the Vietnamese government for the achievements in education.

== Infrastructure ==
Originally located at a small campus on Tran Hung Dao Street in Ward 1 of Vung Tau City, the school was relocated to a much larger campus (9 hectares) at 3/2 Street in Ward 11 in 2010. The city government funded the school to make it a "high-quality school" with a total funding of 300 billion VND (approximately $14.2 million).

In addition to studying, the school also provides an area for recreational and athletic activities including three outdoor basketball courts, a multi-purpose sports center, a football pitch, a swimming pool, an artificial lake, a theatre for performing arts activities, a park, and a 30-metre hill.

== Education ==
Le Quy Don High School for the Gifted offers 13 classes for each grade, with each class majoring in a single subject. These subjects include Mathematics (3 classes), Physics (2 classes), Information technology (1 class), Chemistry (2 classes), Biology (1 class), Vietnamese Literature (1 class), and English (3 classes). Class size ranges from 25 to 30 students. Selected students are sorted into classes from 1 to 2 or 3 in accordance with their performance on the entrance exams. For example, students in class Math 1 have higher entrance exam scores and are evaluated as being academically better than students in class Math 2 and 3 (The only exception is the school year 2011-2012 when students were selected randomly into class 1 and 2)

Tuition fee is at the same level as public schools in Vietnam (60,000 VND/month, approximately US$23.76/year). Apart from the statutory fee, each student has to pay an extra amount of approximately 500,000 VND (US$22) per month for the duration of a school year if they wish to apply for the school's special enhancing program for Vietnamese university entrance examination.

The school also offers scholarships for students. Students are eligible for a scholarship of approximately 600,000 VND (US$24.39) per month if they meet the criteria for being excellent students in both academics and behavior and maintain a GPA of 8.5 or higher in their major subject.

=== Admission ===
Students who want to be admitted must take an advanced written examination consisting of four tests: Mathematics, Literature, English, and a major subject exam. The Mathematics, Literature, and English sections follow the same exam format as those for other high schools in the province. The major subject exam is designed by the school committee with complicated questions both in research and practice fields to classify students into different classes based on their performances. Approximately 350 students achieving the highest scores in the examination will be chosen from the competitive pool of thousands of candidates.

=== Curriculum ===
The curriculum comprises the general education component and gifted coursework for students in specific majors.

The compulsory general education curriculum consists of classes in various fields, including Mathematics, Physics, Chemistry, Literature, English, Biology, History, Information Technology, Geography, Civics Education, Technology, Informatics Vocational Education, National Defense Education, and Physical Education.

While general education is mandatory for every student, all of them are also required to finish additional hours in their specialized majors. The school offers classes for these gifted students in the following majors: Mathematics, Physics, Chemistry, Biology, Vietnamese Literature, Information Technology, and English.

In each major, students are required to pursue a minimum of two additional advanced coursework subjects. The specified pairings for major-related coursework are as follows:

1. Mathematics Majors: Advanced coursework in Physics and Chemistry.

2. Physics Majors: Advanced coursework in Mathematics and Chemistry.

3. Chemistry Majors: Advanced coursework in Mathematics and Physics.

4. Biology Majors: Advanced coursework in Mathematics and Chemistry.

5. Information Technology Majors: Advanced coursework in Mathematics, Physics, and Chemistry.

6. Vietnamese Literature Majors: Advanced coursework in Mathematics and English.

7. English Majors: Advanced coursework in Mathematics and Literature.
