= Trần Đại Nghĩa =

Vietnamese officer and military engineer (1913–1997)

Professor Trần Đại Nghĩa
- Born: Phạm Quang Lễ; 13 September 1913; Tam Bình, Vĩnh Long
- Died: 9 August 1997 (aged 83); Phú Nhuận, Ho Chi Minh City
- Spouse: Nguyễn Thị Khánh
- Military career
- Branch: People's Army of Vietnam
- Service years: 1946–1997
- Rank: Major General
- Commands: People's Army of Vietnam
- Conflicts: First Indochina War
- Awards: Ho Chi Minh Prize; Order of Ho Chi Minh

Trần Đại Nghĩa (13 September 1913 – 9 August 1997) was a Vietnamese scientist, military engineer, and prominent figure in the defense industry of Vietnam. He held the rank of major-general and was recognized as both a military officer and a scholar. He was awarded the Order of Ho Chi Minh and honored as a Hero of Labor. He was also elected as an Academician of the former USSR Academy of Sciences.

== Early life ==
Trần Đại Nghĩa was born as Phạm Quang Lễ in Chánh Hiệp, Tam Bình commune, Vĩnh Long Province, to a poor but educated family on 13 September 1913. He received a bachelor's degree in 1933 in Hanoi. After two years working in the U.S. embassy, he met journalist Dương Quang Ngưu who helped him obtain a Chasseloup-Laubat Fellowship to study in Paris. In 1935, he arrived in France and subsequently graduated with bachelors in engineering and mathematics having attended, among others, the École Polytechnique. It's said that he tried to take 6 college degrees and certificates of the most famous universities of France. He then went to work at the École nationale supérieure de l'aéronautique. In 1942, he moved to Germany, where he worked in various factories on the production of weapons and aircraft.

== Revolutionary activities ==
Trần Đại Nghĩa met Hồ Chí Minh in Paris in 1946 and returned to Vietnam with him on the SS Dumont de Urville, joining the Việt Minh in the north of the country, where he participated in the organization of the production of weapons in the mountain forests. On 5 December 1946 he received from Ho Chi Minh his new revolutionary name, Trần Đại Nghĩa, and because of his military and technical knowledge was made chief of artillery of the Vietnam People's Army. In 1947 he successfully tested his design for a domestically built bazooka, the first of many weapon systems that he devised for in-country manufacture. In 1948 he received the rank of major general, and the following year was then given the new position as Director of Military Research (now the Institute of Military Science and Technology).

In 1950 Nghĩa left the military and began developing the industrial capacity of the Democratic Republic of Vietnam(DRV). In the years 1950 to 1960 he was Deputy Minister of Industry and Commerce. In 1952 he was given the title Hero of Labor and inducted into the Order of Ho Chi Minh. On 6 March 1956 became the first rector of the Hanoi University of Science and Technology established in Hanoi. From 1960 to 1962 he was Minister of Heavy Industry. In 1965 he was appointed Chairman of the State Committee on Science and Technology for Vietnam.

Trần Đại Nghĩa died in Ho Chi Minh City on 9 August 1997, at the age of 83.

== Honors ==
In 1996, a year before his death, Nghia was awarded the Ho Chi Minh Award.

In 2000, the Tran Dai Nghia High School was named after him.

in 2010, an ocean survey vessel was named after him.

In 2013, the Vietnam Post issued a stamp honoring him on the 100th anniversary of his birth.
