= Trần Đại Nghĩa High School for the Gifted =

Tran Dai Nghia High School for the Gifted
- Trường Trung học Phổ thông chuyên Trần Đại Nghĩa

Location
- Lot P2, 38.4-hectare Resettlement Area, An Khanh Ward; Ho Chi Minh City; Vietnam; 10.78323°N 106.73733°E

Information
- Type: Selective; Public; Co-educational
- Motto: Học để biết, học để làm, học để tự khẳng định mình, học để cùng chung sống. ("Learning to know, learning to do, learning to be, learning to live together.")
- Established: 2000; 26 years ago 1874; 152 years ago (Institution Taberd)
- Principal: Nguyễn Minh
- Faculty: 300
- Grades: 9 to 12
- Enrollment: Over 1,200
- Colors: White, navy blue
- Song: Tran Dai Nghia March
- Nickname: TDNers
- Yearbook: Dự án Truyền thống Khối 12 Trần Chuyên
- Website: https://trandainghia.edu.vn

Tran Dai Nghia High School for the Gifted (Vietnamese: Trường Trung học Phổ thông chuyên Trần Đại Nghĩa), commonly referred to as TDN or Trần Chuyên, is a public, co-educational specialized high school in Ho Chi Minh City, Vietnam. It was established in 2000 and is operated by the Ho Chi Minh City Department of Education. The school and its sister school, Tran Dai Nghia Secondary and High School, trace their lineage to Institution Taberd, a Catholic school founded in Saigon in 1874, whose colonial-era campus in District 1 was designated a municipal heritage site in 2019.

Students are admitted on the basis of the city's upper-secondary entrance examination and a separate examination in their chosen specialization.

In 2024 the city government split the formerly integrated secondary and high school into two independent public schools.

Tran Dai Nghia is known for its rigorous specialized programs and academic competition results. It has a reputation for having one of the best high school English programs in Vietnam. It is known as one of the "Big Three" specialized high schools in Ho Chi Minh City alongside Lê Hồng Phong High School for the Gifted and VNU-HCM High School for the Gifted.

== History ==
=== Institution Taberd ===
Institution Taberd was founded on 31 August 1874 as a Catholic missionary school in Saigon by Fr. Henri de Kerlan, and was named after the French missionary bishop Jean-Louis Taberd. It was later run by the De La Salle Brothers, and for more than a century was a prominent Catholic school, educating generations of students, among them many before 1975, as part of a network of Western-style schools in the Republic of Vietnam. After 1975, under nationwide reforms, all La Salle schools in Vietnam, including Institution Taberd, were dissolved and taken over by the state. The campus was converted to public education, first as a pedagogical high school, while the La Salle community that remained in Saigon established the SiViTA dormitory on part of the former grounds.

The campus occupies a block bounded by Nguyễn Du, Hai Bà Trưng and Lý Tự Trọng streets, and its main building is dated to 1890. In December 2019 the Ho Chi Minh City People's Committee classified the campus as a municipal historical and architectural monument.

=== Founding as a specialized school ===
Tran Dai Nghia High School was established on 31 March 2000 by decision of the Ho Chi Minh City People's Committee and named after Trần Đại Nghĩa, a Vietnamese military engineer and scientist who served the Democratic Republic of Vietnam. In 2002 it became a specialized high school, with programs in mathematics, physics, chemistry, literature and English. Biology, computer science, history and geography were added later. Until 2024 the school also taught lower-secondary grades, and admitted its grade 6 intake through its own English-language aptitude test.

=== 2024 reorganization ===
In 2024 the city government approved a reorganization that separated the integrated institution into two independent public schools: Tran Dai Nghia High School for the Gifted and Tran Dai Nghia Secondary and High School. The specialized school kept the founding year of 2000 and its specialized programs, while the new secondary and high school took over non-specialized lower- and upper-secondary education. The specialized school is headquartered in An Khánh ward, on the site that had served as the school's second campus, while the secondary and high school occupies the historic campus at 53 Nguyễn Du. From 2024–25 the specialized school stopped admitting non-specialized classes.

== Academics ==
Tran Dai Nghia follows Vietnam's framework for specialized schools within its specialized classes. Students specialize in one of nine subjects: mathematics, physics, chemistry, biology, literature, English, computer science, history or geography.

English is the school's largest specialization. In the plan for the first class after its split, in 2024–25, English was allotted four classes with 140 students in total, while most other subjects had a single class of 35. For 2025–26 the school offered 105 places in the standard English track and a further 70 in a track run under the city's Project 5695, which teaches mathematics, science and English in an integrated English–Vietnamese curriculum. From 2024–25 the school has admitted students to a specialized English class in which the entrance test covers English together with mathematics and natural science in English.

=== Admissions ===
The school recruits students nationwide and is highly competitive, based on scores in the Ho Chi Minh City upper secondary entrance examination, with seats typically available for approximately one out of every four applicants.

Prior to the 2024 reorganization, Tran Dai Nghia also administered an independent examination for lower secondary admissions, admitting 350 students from more than 4,300 applicants in recent admission cycles for an acceptance rate of 8.14%.

== Reputation and achievements ==
=== National Olympiad ===
In 2025–26 the school won 36 prizes, second among Ho Chi Minh City schools behind Lê Hồng Phong High School for the Gifted's 153 prizes.

English is the school's strongest area in national competition. Its students have won national first prizes in English every year since 2020–21, including four of the nine awarded nationwide in 2021–22, and the school produced the National Champion in the subject in both 2022–23 and 2023–24.

=== Other recognition ===
Tran Dai Nghia High School for the Gifted has received the Third-Class Labor Order awarded by the President of Vietnam.

== Student life ==
Students run 22 clubs and organizations including Model United Nations, debate, robotics, arts and culture, language, environment, journalism, cinematography, photography and women's health. Classes also compete in Vũ hội Trần chuyên, a singing and dance contest.

The school holds an annual Student Sports Meet with competitions in basketball, football, chess, xiangqi (Chinese chess), tug of war, table tennis and badminton.

== Notable alumni ==
- Audrey Chau, graduate of the School of Public and International Affairs at Princeton University, 2021 recipient of the Donald E. Stokes Dean's Prize.
- Arlette Quỳnh Anh Trần, curator and director of the Post Vidai art collection, member of Forbes 30 Under 30 Asia.
- Lê Đình Hiếu, CEO of the GAP Academy, member of Forbes 30 Under 30 Asia.
- Lê Nguyễn Thiên Hương, founder of the Save Sơn Đoòng project, admissions and financial aid officer at Fulbright University Vietnam, member of Forbes 30 Under 30 Asia.

== See also ==
- List of high schools for the gifted in Vietnam
- Lê Hồng Phong High School for the Gifted
- VNU-HCM High School for the Gifted
