= Lê Hồng Phong High School for the Gifted =

High school in Ho Chi Minh City

- Trường Trung học Phổ thông chuyên Lê Hồng Phong
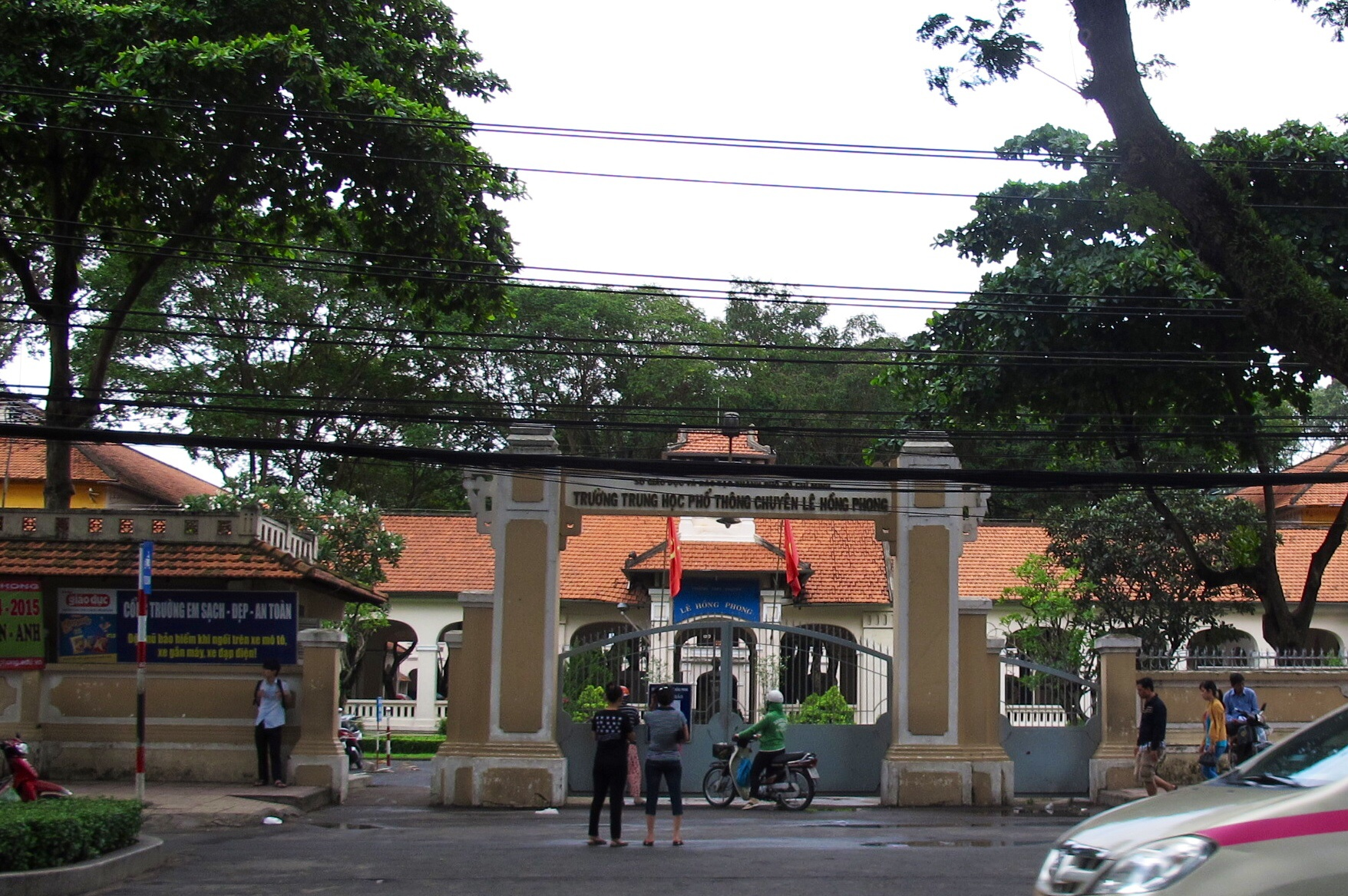
- The school gate

Location
- 235 Nguyễn Văn Cừ Boulevard, Chợ Quán ward Ho Chi Minh City, 700000; Vietnam; 10°45′50″N 106°40′54″E

Information
- Former name: Petrus Ký High School
- Type: Public
- Established: 1927; 99 years ago
- Principal: Hồ Tấn Minh
- Faculty: 152
- Gender: Co-educational
- Enrollment: 2045
- Campus size: 20 acres
- Campus type: Urban
- Colors: White, navy blue, beige, yellow
- Website: thpt-lehongphong-tphcm.edu.vn

Lê Hồng Phong High School for the Gifted (Vietnamese: Trường Trung học Phổ thông chuyên Lê Hồng Phong; formerly Petrus Ký High School) is a high school in Ho Chi Minh City (Saigon), Vietnam. Established in 1927, the school is one of the oldest high schools still operating in Vietnam.

== History ==
Lê Hồng Phong High School for the Gifted was the third high school founded in Saigon by French colonizers, after the Collège Chasseloup-Laubat (1874) (now Lê Quý Đôn Secondary and High School; both were one school then being split into separate secondary school and high school after 1975) and Collège de Jeunes Filles Indigènes (1915) (now Nguyễn Thị Minh Khai High School). In 1925, Architect Ernest Hebrard was commissioned to design the school in Chợ Quán.

On 28 November 1927, a temporary branch of Collège Chasseloup-Laubat, called Collège de Cochinchine, was founded in Chợ Quán for native students. The branch was under the management of the Board at Collège Chasseloup-Laubat.

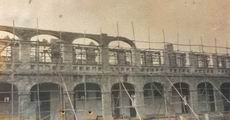
Petrus Ký High School during construction

The construction of the school was completed in 1928. On 11 August 1928, the interim Governor-General of French Indochina, René Robert, signed Decree no. 3116 to establish a native French secondary school (Lycée), combining Collège de Cochinchine and about 200 pupils from Collège Chasseloup Laubat. The Governor Blanchard de la Brosse named the school Lycée Petrus Trương Vĩnh Ký, in honour of Vietnamese Catholic scholar Pétrus Trương Vĩnh Ký. The school was known as Petrus Ký High School for almost a half-century.

Lycée Petrus Truong Vinh Ky, commonly referred to as Lycée Petrus, commenced the first day on October 1, 1928. The first principal was Mr. Sainte Luce Banchelin, the bureau's Mr. Boulé, the banker Mahé.

The chairman of the board was Mr. Gazano and the Vietnamese members were: Mr. Nguyen Thanh Giung, Ph.D., chemist, contract professor, Mr. Ho Bao Toan and Mr. Tran Le Quat. The officials are parents French commissioners Sainte Luce Banchelin and Mahé. The president is the Principal and the members are: John, Painting Professor, Mr. Paquier, Professor of Literature, Mr. Nguyen Van Nho, Professor of Literature, Mr. Nguyen Van Thuong, and supervisor and secretary is Mr. Boulé.

There were two levels of study: Enseignement primaire supérieur Franco-indigène (DEPSI) and French Secondary (enseignement secondaire Franco-indigène).

=== Petrus Ky students in French Indochina War and Vietnam War eras ===
In 1940, the Petrus Ký Student Club was founded. The club organised extra-curricular activities including performing arts, sports, camping, attracting students from within and outside Petrus Ký. It was during this time that the students Lưu Hữu Phước and Mai Văn Bộ (later ambassador) wrote "La Marche des Étudiants" song, the predecessor of the patriotic "Tiếng Gọi Thanh Niên (Call to the Young)", "Tiếng Gọi Công Dân (Call to the Citizens)" and "Quốc Ca của Việt Nam Cộng Hòa (The National Anthem of the Republic of Vietnam, National anthem of South Vietnam)".

Within a year, the club and its activities were prohibited by the French-Indochina government. In 1941, the school was temporarily relocated to the Pedagogical College of Saigon due to the French Indochina war. It resumed its regular teaching activities in the same year, at its own establishment.

In 1942, Petrus Ký students, inspired by students in Hanoi, founded an organisation named S.E.T. (Section Exécution Tourisme). The organisation functioned as a scout programme aiming at developing character, citizenship, and personal fitness qualities. During this time, several Petrus Ký professors such as Phạm Thiều, Lê Văn Chí and Trần Văn Thanh, also subtly professed their patriotism in lectures. In 1945, the school was temporarily closed after evacuating to Tan Dinh school district. It re-opened in April 1946 in a seminary on Lucien Mossard street. It returned to Chợ Quán in the year 1947.

In 1961, it became a secondary school in the Southern Vietnamese educational system. In 1976, the school was renamed after a former general secretary of the Communist Party of Vietnam, Lê Hồng Phong, and became a high school. In 1990, it was renamed to Lê Hồng Phong High School for the Gifted.

== Institution ==
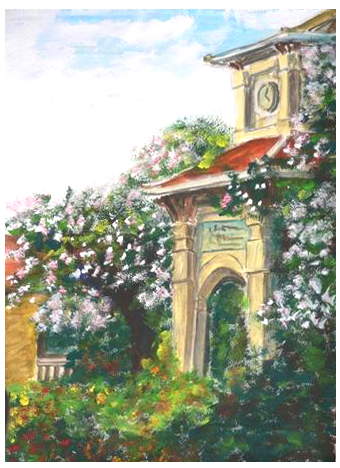
Lycée Lê Hồng Phong, an oil painting by Nguyễn Hoàng Việt, alumnus, 2003-06

Lê Hồng Phong, together with High School for the Gifted (Phổ thông Năng khiếu) and Trần Đại Nghĩa High School, make up the Big 3 of "Highly selective" schools (trường chuyên) in Ho Chi Minh City and in Southern Vietnam, having achieved significant numbers of awards in both domestic and international academic competitions.

== Recognitions ==
- In 2007, the school was awarded the 1st Level Labour Medal by the President of Vietnam.

== Staff ==
The school has 20 departments whose staff bear different responsibilities of teaching and operating the institution.

== Academic reputation ==
10th grade students of Le Hong Phong Specialized High School

In 2018, the school admitted fewer than 500 students. through the annual year-10 academic entrance examination.

=== National Excellent Student Contest ===
- School year 2024-2025

According to the Ranking of High schools in the 2024-2025 National Excellent Student Contest announced by the Ministry of Education and Training, the school ranked first with 109 awards. This included 2 first prizes (with one valedictorian in Literature), 27 second prizes, 34 third prizes and 46 consolidation prizes.

- School year 2025-2026

The school achieved a total of 153 awards, specifically 5 first prizes, 44 second prizes, 39 third prizes, and 65 consolation prizes. This accounted for more than half of the total awards in Ho Chi Minh City, and also set a record as the high school with the most students winning National awards in 2025-2026.

== Principals ==
School year	Principal
1927–1929	Sainte Luce Banchelin
1929–1931	Paul Valencot
1931–1933	Andre Neveu
1933–1938	Paul Valencot
1938–1944	Le Jeannic
1944–1947	Taillade
1947–1951	Lê Văn Khiêm
1951–1955	Phạm Văn Còn
1955–1957	Nguyễn Văn Kính
1957–1958	Nguyễn Văn Thơ
1958–1960	Nguyễn Văn Trương
1960–1963	Phạm Văn Lược
1963–1964	Nguyễn Thanh Liêm
1964–1966	Trần Ngọc Thái
1966–1969	Trần Văn Thử
1969–1971	Trần Ngọc Thái
1971-1971	Trần Văn Nhơn
1971–1973	Bùi Vĩnh Lập
1973–1975	Nguyễn Minh Đức
1975–1977	Nguyễn Văn Thiện
1977–1991	La Thị Hạnh
1991–1997	Nguyễn Hữu Danh
1997–2005	Đặng Thanh Châu
2005–2013	Võ Anh Dũng
2014–2019	Nguyễn Thị Yến Trinh
2019–2026	Phạm Thị Bé Hiền

== Notable alumni ==
- Trần Đại Nghĩa, military scientist, ingénieur, inventor
- Trần Văn Ơn, political activist
- Huỳnh Tấn Phát
- Nguyễn Văn Trấn
- Mai Văn Bộ
- Huỳnh Văn Tiểng
- Trương Tấn Sang, seventh president of Vietnam
- Nguyễn Minh Triết, sixth president of Vietnam
- Nguyễn Thái Bình, anti-Vietnam war activist in United States
- Nguyễn Tiến Trung
- Trần Ngọc Liễng - lawyer
- Trần Văn Khê, Honorary Member of the International Music Council of UNESCO, director of research at CNRS and professor at the Sorbonne
- Nguyễn Văn Trấn
- Huỳnh Văn Tiểng
- Lưu Hữu Phước, recipient of the Hồ Chí Minh Prize in 1996
- Hoàng Thanh Tâm
- Cẩm Ly, pop singer in Vietnam war era
- Trương Minh Quốc Thái
- Đức Tuấn
- Hà Anh Tuấn, popular R&B singer
- Tóc Tiên
- Uyên Linh, winner of the third season of Vietnam Idol in 2010
