= Bến Tre High School =

Coordinates: 10°14′17″N 106°22′44″E

Location
- 21 Le Qui Don Str, Ward 2, Bến Tre City; Bến Tre; Vietnam

Information
- Type: Public
- Motto: Hiền tài là nguyên khí quốc gia (Thân Nhân Trung)
- Established: February 15, 1990
- Principal: Dr. Bùi Văn Năm (2004-present)
- Faculty: 22
- Grades: 10-12
- Enrollment: 650
- Website: https://www.thptchuyenbentre.edu.vn/

Bến Tre High School for the Gifted (other name: Bến Tre High School, Vietnamese: Trường Trung học Phổ thông Chuyên Bến Tre or Phổ thông Trung học Bến Tre) is a metropolitan public magnet school in Bến Tre, Vietnam. It is located at 21 Le Quy Don, Ward 2, Bến Tre City, next to the shores of Truc Giang Lake (Chung Thuy Lake).

== History ==
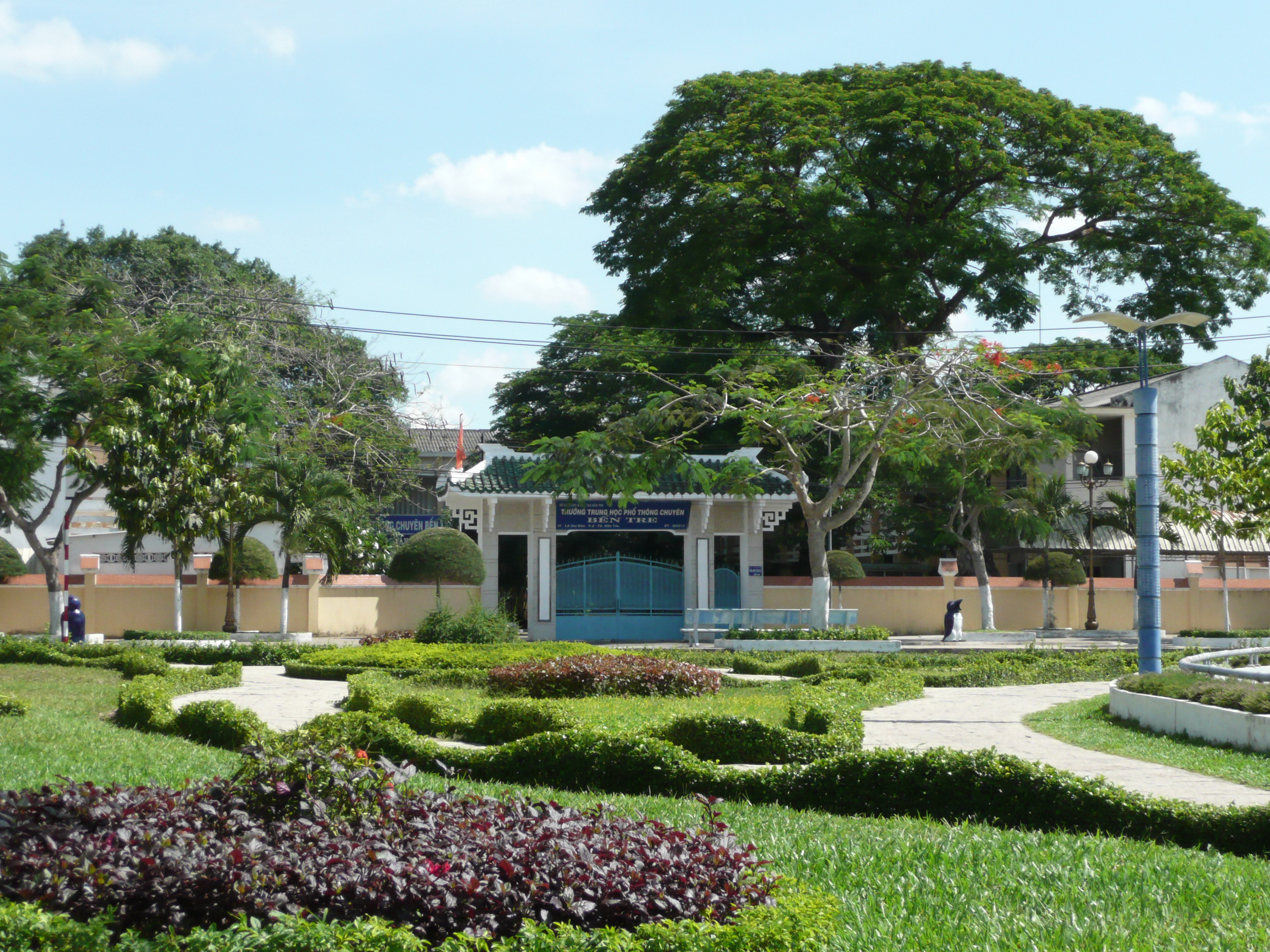
Bến Tre High School, next to Truc Giang Lake

Place 21 Le Quy Don is the basis of official public schools of the province's first (opening 1954). This campus was the headquarters of the schools with different names over the period:

- Trường Trung học Công lập Bến Tre (1954–1958)
- Trường Trung học Công lập Kiến-Hòa (1958 - ?)
- Kien Hoa High school (Trường Trung học Kiến Hòa) (? - 1975)
- Lac Long Quan High school (Trường Trung học Tổng Hợp Lạc Long Quân) (? - ?)
- Nguyen Dinh Chieu High school (Trường Trung học Phồ thông Nguyễn Đình Chiểu) (? - 1994)
- And now, Bến Tre High School for the Gifted (1994 - now)

== Badge ==
The school badge is a stylized image from the play book, with two letters AZ on the left represents infinite knowledge, on the sunflowers, the right is the text name of the "Trường Trung học Phổ thông Chuyên Bến Tre".

== Awards ==
- Labour Medal third class (Huân chương Lao động hạng III ): 2003
- Labour Medal second class (Huân chương Lao động hạng II ): 2010

== Gallery ==
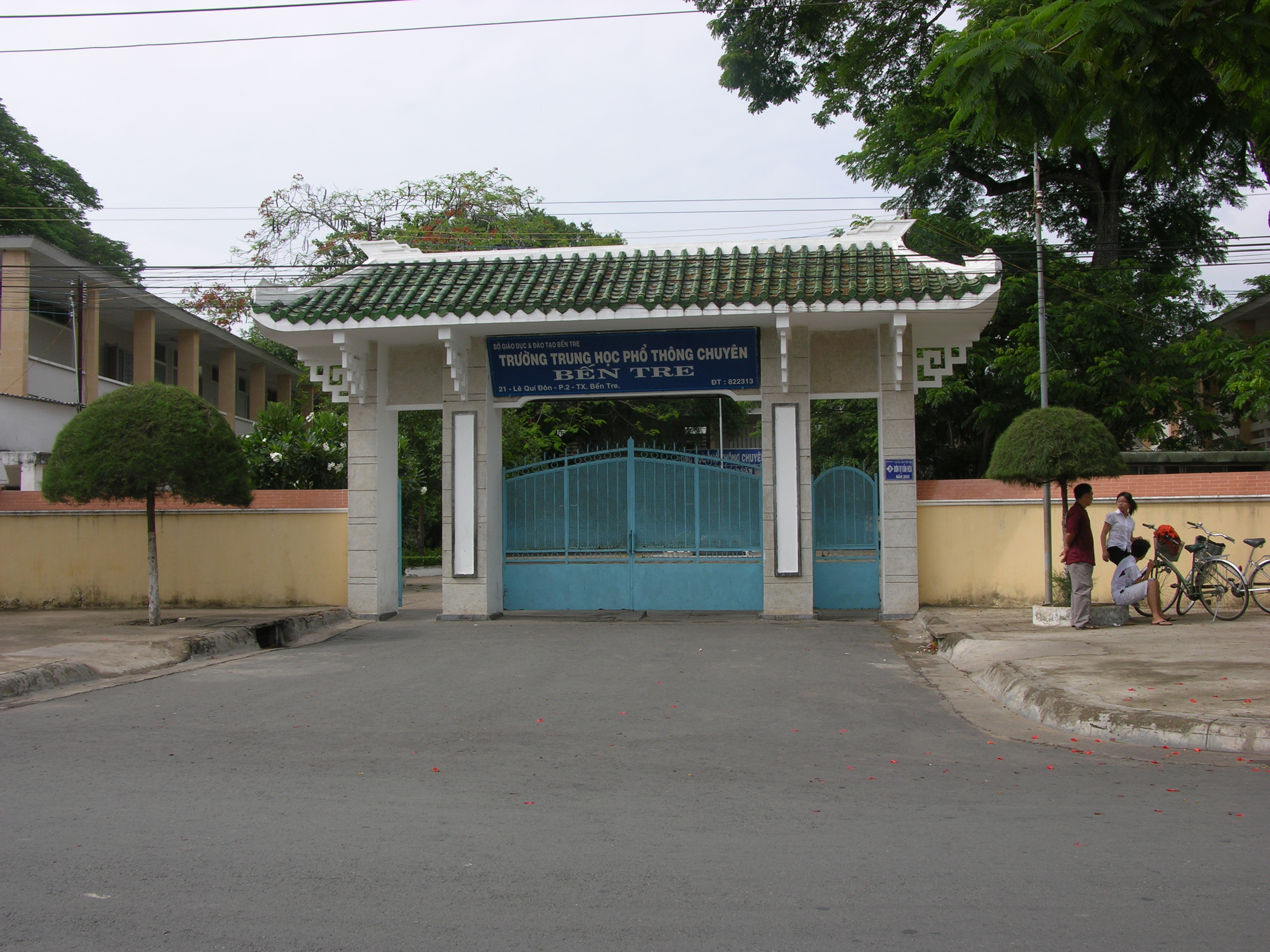
Bến Tre High School in 2008.
