= Lê Quý Đôn High School for the Gifted, Da Nang =

- Trường THPT Chuyên Lê Quý Đôn, Đà Nẵng
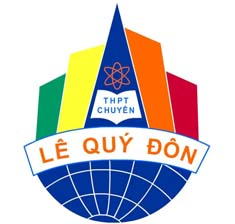

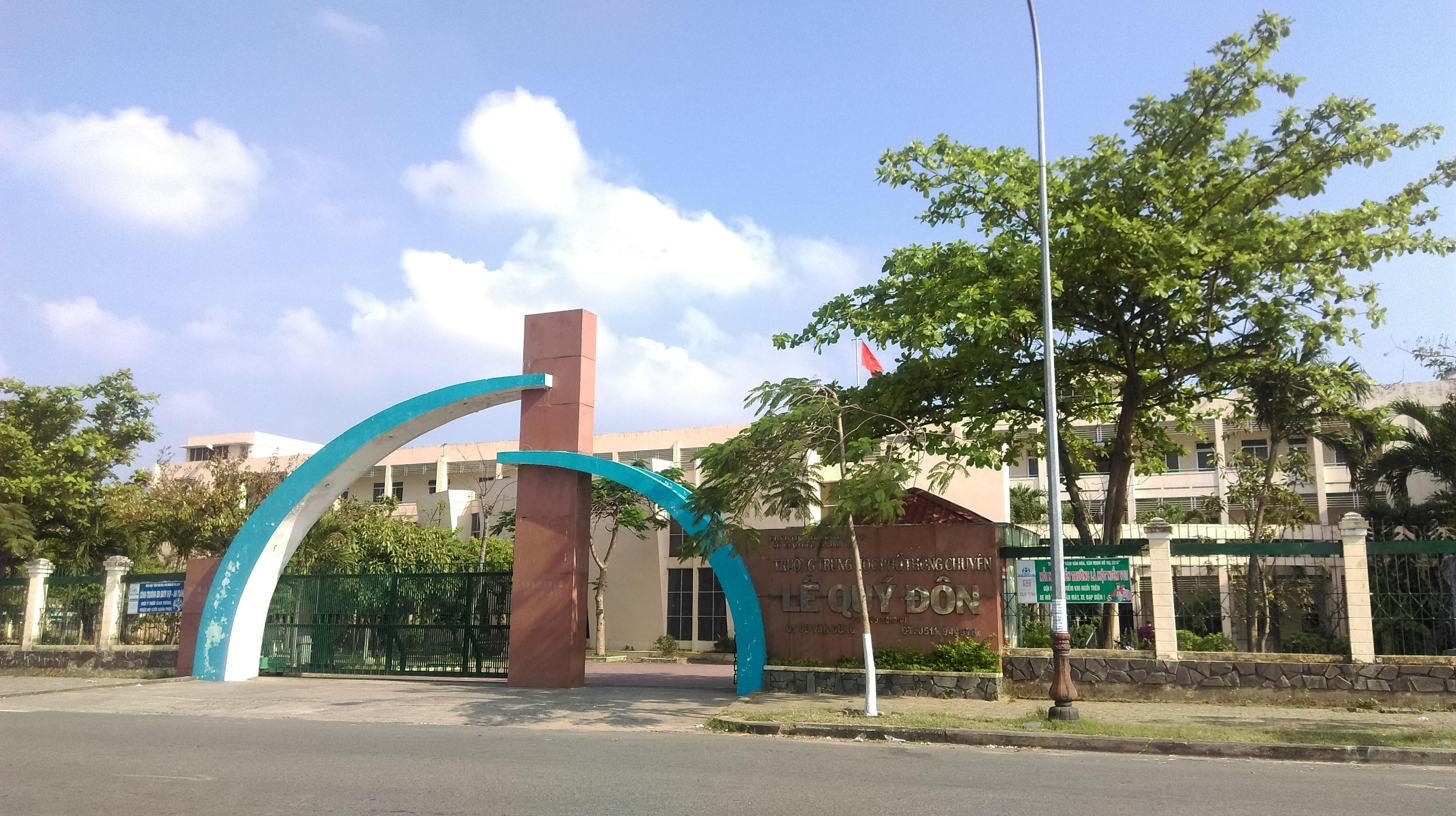

Location
- 01, Vũ Văn Dũng St, Sơn Trà; Da Nang, Vietnam; Vietnam

Information
- Type: Public, Gifted, Advanced Curriculum
- Established: 15 October 1986; 39 years ago
- Principal: Mr. Lê Thanh Hải
- Faculty: ~100
- Grades: 10, 11, 12
- Gender: Co-educational
- Enrolment: ~900
- Average class size: 20
- Language: Vietnamese with English and French as foreign languages classes
- Campus type: Urban
- Color: Blue
- School fees: No tuition fee
- Website: www.thpt-lequydon-danang.edu.vn (Vietnamese)

Lê Quý Đôn High School for the Gifted, Da Nang (Vietnamese: Trung học Phổ thông Chuyên Lê Quý Đôn, Đà Nẵng) is a highly selective high school in Da Nang city, Vietnam. It was established in 1986 as Quang Nam - Da Nang Gifted School (Secondary and Senior High School). Like other specialized schools nationwide in Vietnam, the school offers advanced and specialized curriculum for gifted students who show their exceptional talents in the Natural Sciences, Social Sciences, and Humanities.

Currently, this is the only gifted high school in Da Nang, attracting top students from the city as well as the neighbor province Quang Nam. The school has many students who have won awards nationally and medalists from International Science Olympiads (IMO, IOI, IPhO, IBO, APhO).

== History ==
=== Establishment ===
The school was founded on 15 October 1986 with the name Quang Nam - Da Nang Gifted School (Secondary and Senior High School). In the pioneer batch, the school started with 38 faculty and staff, 58 students in 5 majors. In April 1991, the school was renamed as Le Quy Don High School for the Gifted - this name was based on the 18th-century Vietnamese philosopher Le Quy Don.

As of 2015, a faculty of more than 100 teachers, who are highly qualified with approximately half of them holding postgraduate degrees (M.Sc and PhD), serves about 900 students in three grades from 10th to 12th.

=== Infrastructure ===
Since the academic year 2003–2004, the city government funded the school to make it a "high-quality school" with total funding of 70 billion VND. The school was then relocated to its new campus at 1 Vu Van Dung Street, Son Tra District. Since 2011, the school 11-storey dormitory started accepting student residents. The dormitory capacity of 149 rooms with 3 size (4-people, 6-people, and 8-people) can support up to 750 students. In addition, the school also provides football field, exercise area, swimming pool and a multi-purpose sport hall.

=== Principals ===
Academic Year	Principal
1986 - 1990	Mr. Nguyễn Tiến Hành
1990 - 1992	Mr. Nguyễn Tâm Tháp
1992 - 1995	Mr. Huỳnh Văn Hoa
1995 - 2000	Mr. Lê Phú Kỳ
2000 - 2003	Mr. Đặng Thanh
2003 - 2009	Mr. Vũ Đình Chuẩn
2009 - 2010	Mr. Lê Trung Chinh
2010 - 2015	Mr. Nguyễn Đình Vĩnh
2015 - 2023	Mr. Lê Vinh
2023–Present	Mr. Lê Thanh Hải

== Admission ==
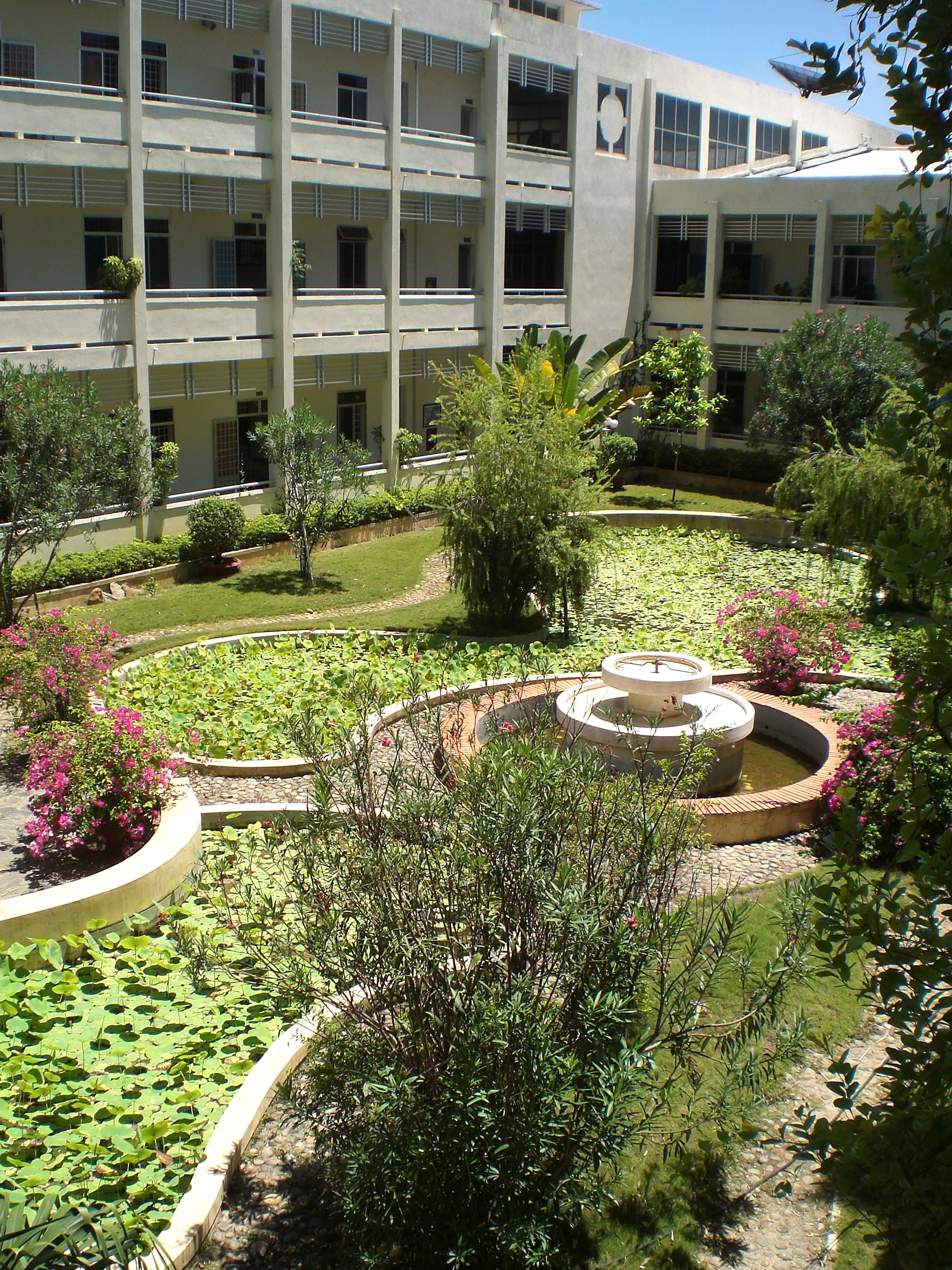
Le Quy Don Campus

As a highly selective public high school, admission into Le Quy Don High School for the Gifted is granted through a rigorous application process with entrance exams. The application process comprises two rounds:

- Round 1: Screening based on secondary school records (academic and attitude/aptitude)
- Round 2: Entrance exam for students who pass Round 1.

In Round 2, students sit for exams in Mathematics, Literature, English, and must write a paper on one of the major subjects offered in school. The major subjects are Mathematics, Physics, Chemistry, Biology, Literature, History, Geography, English, French, and Informatics.

In academic year 2015–2016, the school recruited 310 students including 290 students from Da Nang city and 20 students from Quang Nam province.

== School color ==
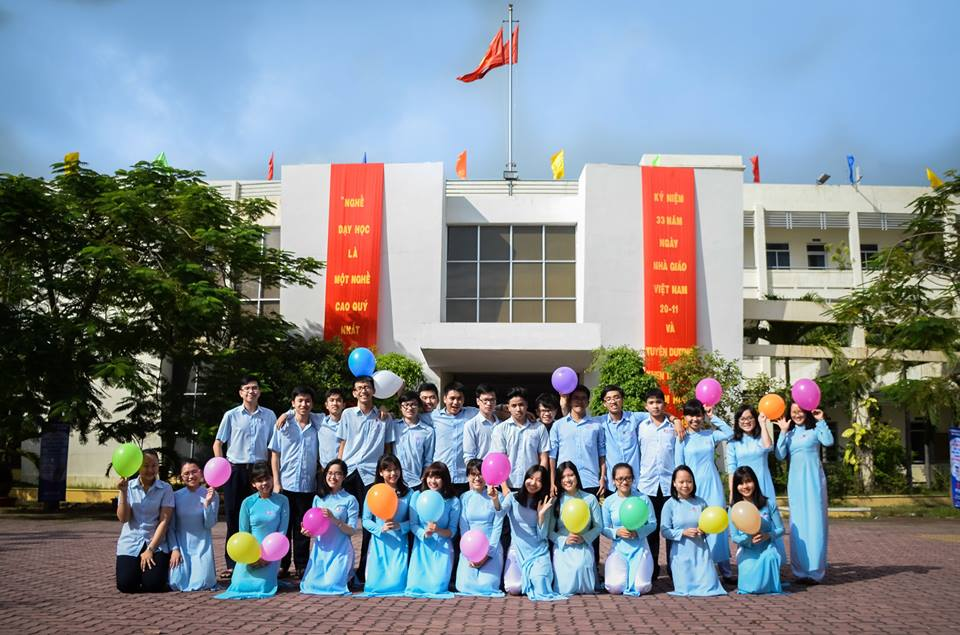
School uniform

Blue is chosen as the school color, manifested in the school uniforms.
