= Hanoi National University of Education =

Public university in Vietnam

- Trường Đại học Sư phạm Hà Nội
- Former names: Hanoi University of Education; Hanoi University of Education No. 1 Hanoi National University of Education
- Type: Public University
- Established: 1951 (Hanoi University of Education); 1975 (Hanoi University of Education No.1); 1993 (Vietnam National University, Hanoi); 1999 (Hanoi National University of Education)
- President: Nguyen Van Minh
- Undergraduates: 3,000
- Postgraduates: 1,500
- Location: Hanoi, Vietnam
- Campus: Urban 150 ha (0.58 sq mi)
- Website: english.hnue.edu.vn

Hanoi National University of Education (HNUE; Vietnamese: Trường Đại học Sư phạm Hà Nội) is a public university in Vietnam. Established in 1951 as the fourth university in Vietnam (after Indochina Medical College (1902), University of Indochina (1904), École Supérieure des Beaux-Arts de L'Indochine (1925)), it is one of the largest higher education institutions in this country. The university also operates HNUE High school for gifted students, a national high school for gifted students.

Established in 1951 with the name of National University of Science Education, the school was headed by Prof Lê Văn Thiêm, the father of Vietnam's Mathematics society. In 1956, it was merged with National University of Arts and Social Science Education and renamed Hanoi University of Education. In 1993, the university, along with University of Hanoi and Foreign Language Teachers' Training College, became the main posts for the establishment of Vietnam National University, Hanoi (VNUH). However, thanks to the Vietnam government's requirement for establishing an independent institution to train teachers, the university was split from VNUH in 1999 and renamed the Hanoi National University of Education - a hitherto major national university in Vietnam.

The biggest astronomical optical telescope in South East Asia is situated on the school campus. In 2008, HNUE was the host for the 39th International Physics Olympiad.

== History ==
Hanoi National University of Education was founded on 11 October 1951. Since then, it has been accredited by the Ministry of Education and Training of Vietnam (MOET), which has also managed and awarded the university's undergraduate and post-graduate degrees. HNUE was a member of Vietnam National University, Hanoi for 6 years (1993-1999). It is one of the 14 key national universities in Vietnam.

== Milestones ==
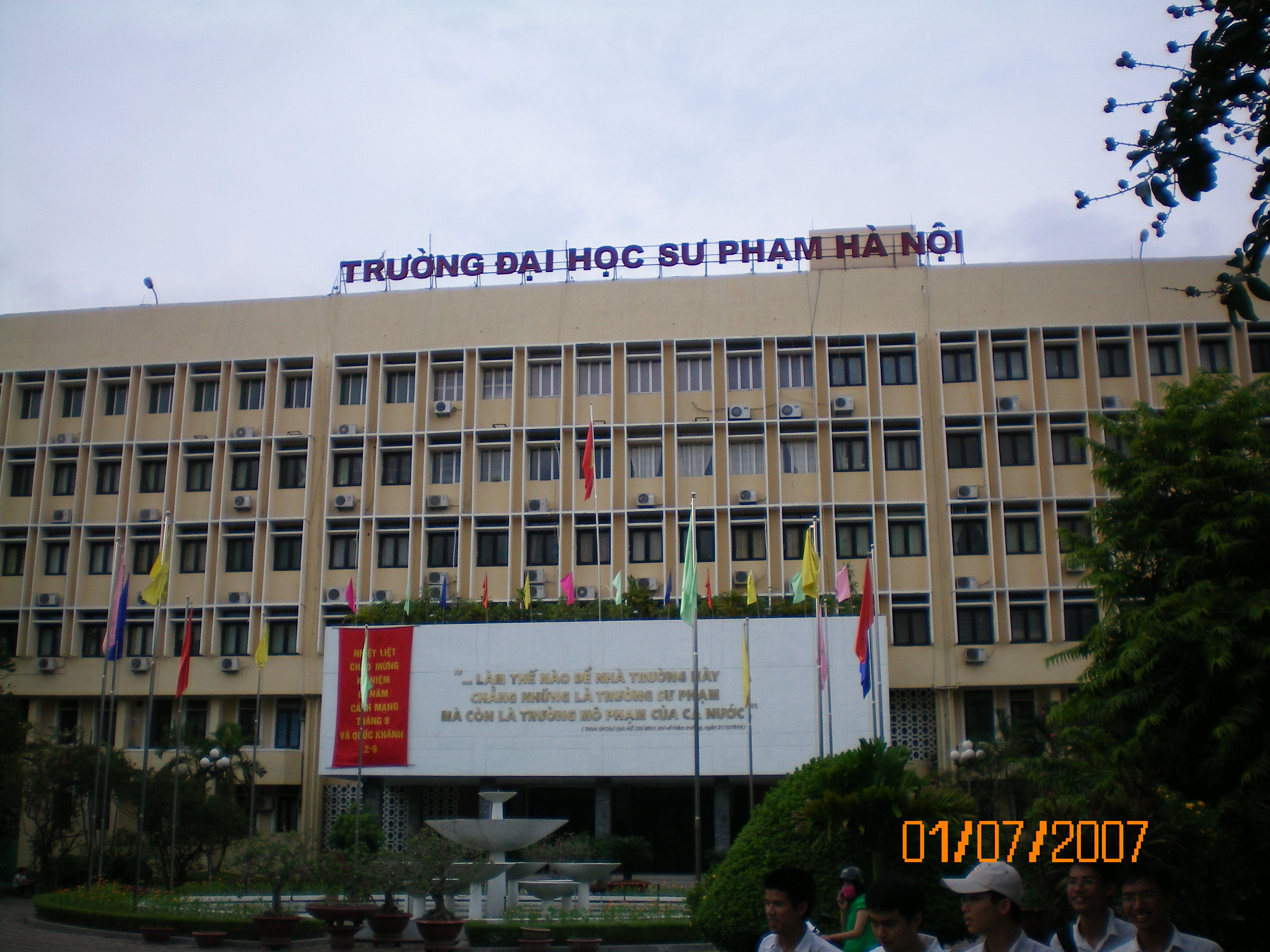

- 10/10/1945: Department of Social Sciences and Humanity – Hanoi, precursor of HNUE, was founded
- 11/10/1951: National University of Science Education was established
- 1956: Hanoi University of Education established

== Present form ==
There are about 10,000 on-campus students, and more than 30,000 undergraduate and 1,500 postgraduate enrollments each year. Currently, the total number of full-time faculty and staff of HNUE is more than 1,300, including nearly 800 professors and lecturers across departments and schools on campus.

== Education ==
HNUE has a semester-based modular system for conducting courses. There are two semesters per academic year, and new students are usually enrolled in fall semesters. Today, HNUE has 25 faculties and schools across the campus in Hanoi, and provides a broad-based curriculum underscored by multi-disciplinary courses and cross-faculty enrichment.

== Structure ==
The university encompasses a wide range of offices and services, training faculties and departments, centers and institutes as well as affiliated schools.

=== Faculties and departments ===
Major faculties and departments in the university include:

- Faculty of Arts
- Faculty of Biology
- Faculty of Chemistry
- Faculty of Early Childhood Education
- Faculty of Education Management
- Faculty of English Language
- Faculty of French Language
- Faculty of Geography
- Faculty of History
- Faculty of Information Technology
- Faculty of Mathematics-Informatics
- Faculty of Linguistics and Literature
- Faculty of National Defense Education
- Faculty of Physical Education
- Faculty of Physics
- Faculty of Political Education
- Faculty of Primary Education
- Faculty of Psychology & Pedagogy
- Faculty of Social Work
- Faculty of Special Education
- Faculty of Technology Education
- Faculty of Vietnam Studies
- Department of Chinese Language
- Department of Russian Language

=== Research institutes and centers ===
- Institute for Educational Research
- Institute of Social Sciences Research
- Research Centers:
  - Center for Applied Geography (CAG)
  - Center for Biodiversity Resources, Education and Development (CEBRED)
  - Center for Children Language, Literature and Arts
  - Center for Complex and Function Analysis
  - Center for Computational Science (CSS)
  - Center for Cryptozoic and Rare Animals Research
  - Center for Environmental Research and Education
  - Center for Environmental Research and Education
  - Center for Experimental Biology
  - Center for Mangrove Ecosystem Research (MERC)
  - Center for Nano Science and Technology
  - Center for Research and Teacher Professional Development
  - Center for Soil Animals Research
  - Hanoi Center for Financial and Industrial Mathematics
- Training Centers
  - Center for Advanced Training Technology Application (CATTA)
  - Center for Applied Informatics
  - Center for Continuing Training and Professional Development
  - Centre for International Education and Training (CIET)
  - Center for Special Education Training and Research
  - Institute for Social Science Studies

=== Affiliated schools ===
- HNUE High school for gifted students (Truong THPT Chuyen Dai hoc Su pham)
- Nguyen Tat Thanh School
- Bup Sen Xanh Kindergarten
- Nguyen Tat Thanh Primary School
- HNUE Elite Middle School

== Presidents and principals ==
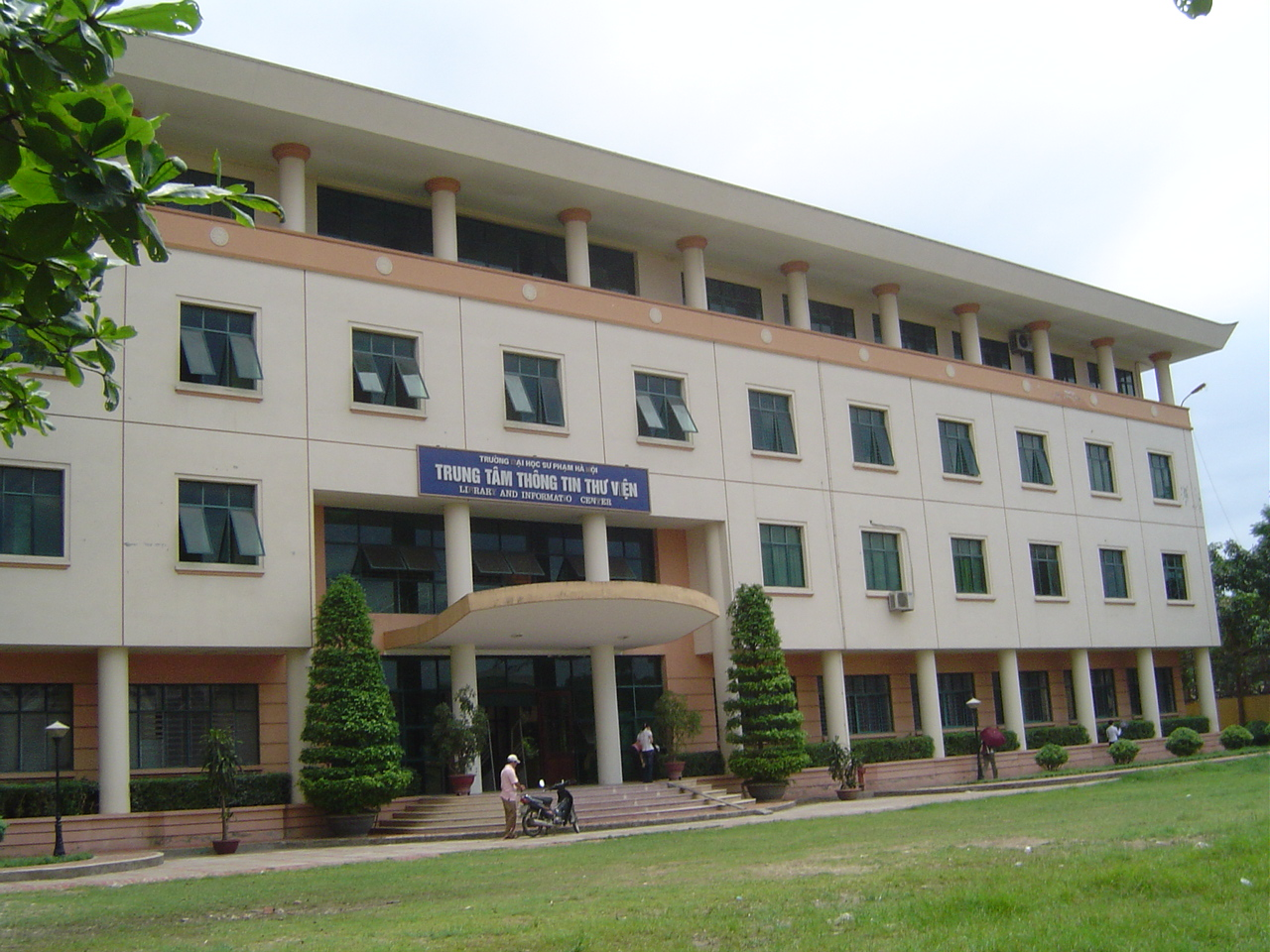
HNUE Library

#	Name	Title	Major	Term of Office
1	Lê Văn Thiêm	Professor	Mathematics	1951 - 1954
2	Đặng Thai Mai	Professor	Literature	1954 - 1956
3	Pham Huy Thong	Professor Sir	History	1956 - 1966
4	Nguyen Luong Ngoc	Professor	Literature	1967 - 1975
5	Nguyen Canh Toan	Professor	Mathematics	1967 - 1975
6	Dương Trọng Bái	Professor	Physics	1976 - 1980
7	Pham Quy Tu	Professor	Physics	1980 - 1988
8	Vu Tuan	Professor	Mathematics	1988 - 1992
9	Nghiem Dinh Vy	Associate Professor	History	1992 - 1997
10	Đinh Quang Bao	Professor	Biology	1997 - 2006
11	Nguyen Viet Thinh	Professor	Geology	2006 - 2012
12	Nguyen Van Minh	Professor	Physics	2013–present

== Alumni ==
Since its inception in 1951, HNUE has had many distinguished alumni, including well-known professors, educators, politicians, writers, business executives, and local public figures. Some popular names are:

- Cao Huy Đỉnh (1927-1975): Professor, Vietnam folk culture researcher, Ho Chi Minh national award Giải thưởng Hồ Chí Minh Phase 1 (1996);
- Nguyễn Văn Hiệu: Professor, PhD in physics; chairman, Scientific Council of Materials Science, Vietnam Academy of Science and Technology (VAST); Vice-chairman, State Committee for Science and Technology of Vietnam, 1970–75; vice-pres., Natl. Centre for Scientific Research of Vietnam, 1975–82; member, Intl. Committee for Future Accelerators, 1984–86; chairman, Committee for Space Research and Application in Vietnam, 1983–98; and pres., VAST, 1983–2002; chairman, General Council of Asia Pacific Center for Theoretical Physics (APCTP) Seoul-Pohang, 1996–2002; chairman, Board of Trustees of APCTP, 2004–2010; a founding principal of the University of Technology, Vietnam National University, Hanoi (VNUH). He was awarded the Lenin Prize for Science and Technology, USSR, in 1986, and was a member of the Russian Acadedemy of Sciences.
- Nguyễn Văn Đạo: Prof.PhD in Mechanical Engineering, Director of Vietnam National University, Hanoi (VNUH), President of Vietnam Association of Mechanical Industry, Member of Russian Academy of Sciences
- Nguyễn Khoa Điềm: Poet; Minister, Ministry of Information and Communications (Vietnam)
- Vũ Đình Cự: Professor, PhD in physics, Former vice-president of the National Parliament of Vietnam.
- Phan Đình Diệu: Professor of Math, President of Vietnam Union of Science and Technology associations, deputy director of Information and Technology Development Committee (Phase 1)
- Dương Trung Quốc: Historist, General Secretary Vietnam History Association Hội Khoa học Lịch sử Việt Nam, Member of Parliament
- Dương Thụ: Musician
- Phạm Tiến Duật: Poet
- Nguyễn Đình Trí: Professor, PhD in Math, President of Vietnam Mathematical Association
- Vũ Đình Hòa: Professor, PhD in Math; Faculty, Vietnam National University, Hanoi; Direct of FPT Young Talents
- Nguyễn Huy Thiệp: Writer (graduated from Faculty of History);
- Trần Khải Thanh Thủy: Writer
- Văn Như Cương: Member, National Education Association; President and Founder of Luong The Vinh High School for the Gifted.
- Đàm Bích Thủy: Director, National Australia Bank Vietnam Representative Office; President of Citibank Vietnam.; President of Fulbright University Vietnam
