= High School for Gifted Students =

High School for Gifted Students may refer to:

- High School for Gifted Students, Hanoi National University of Education
- High School for Gifted Students, VNU University of Science
- High School for Gifted Students, VNU University of Social Sciences and Humanities
- High School for Gifted Students, HueUni University of Science

== See also ==
- List of high schools for the gifted in Vietnam
