= High School for Gifted Students, VNU University of Science =

High School for Gifted Students of Science
- Trường Trung học phổ thông chuyên Khoa học Tự nhiên

Location
- 182 Luong The Vinh Str., Thanh Xuân district Hanoi; Vietnam

Information
- Type: Public
- Established: 1965
- Principal: Dr. Lê Công Lợi
- Grades: 10-12
- Gender: Co-ed
- Enrollment: ≈ 1500
- Student Union/Association: HSGS Student Union
- Affiliation: VNU University of Science
- Website: http://hsgs.edu.vn/

The HUS High School for Gifted Students, commonly known as High School for Gifted Students of Science (HSGS; Vietnamese: Trường Trung học phổ thông chuyên Khoa học Tự nhiên), is a specialized, most-selective (6% acceptance rate) public magnet school of VNU University of Science, a member of Vietnam National University, Hanoi system. The school serves as a national educational institution to nurture talented Vietnamese students who excelled at natural sciences. The largest percentage of its graduates attend the most prestigious universities in Vietnam.

The department of Mathematics was established first in 1965, followed by the department of Physics; the department of Chemistry and Biology was established in 1998.

HUS High School for Gifted Students is ranked the first in National Science Olympiads (national qualification for International Science Olympiad such as IMO, IOI, IPhO, IChO, and IBO). This is also the high school where Professor Ngô Bảo Châu, the first Vietnamese recipient of the Fields medal, studied.

== Foundation and history ==
In September 1965, renowned Vietnamese mathematician and Professor Hoàng Tụy, supported by Professor Lê Văn Thiêm, Professor Ngụy Như Kon Tum, Professor Tạ Quang Bửu and Prime Minister Phạm Văn Đồng, founded the Special class of Mathematics with 38 students at the temporary war-time evacuation location of University of Hanoi in Đại Từ District, Thái Nguyên Province. This class was the precursor of HUS High School for Gifted Students.

From 1966 to 1985, the school had the name Specialized School of Mathematics and Informatics, which were under the administration of the faculty of Mathematics, Mechanics, Informatics - Hanoi University of Science.

In 1998: Specialized School of Science.

In June 2010: the High School for Gifted Students, Hanoi University of Science.

The HUS High School for Gifted Students was honored with national awards: the 3rd degree Labor Decoration in 1985, the 2nd degree Labor Decoration in 1995, the 1st degree Labor Decoration in 2000; the Independence Decoration and the Hero of Labor in 2005.

== Education ==
Most notably, the school's mathematics and science curriculums are accelerated, and a 3-year standard curriculum at normal public high schools is condensed into the 2.5-year specialized curriculum and the 0.5-year College Entrance Exam preparation. The school also offers honours courses in the Specializations (see below) to further stretch the abilities of able students beyond the already-accelerated curriculum.

The HUS High school for Gifted Students now comprises five specializations:

- Mathematics
- Informatics
- Physics
- Chemistry
- Biology

Each department, led by a head of department, had been under the administration of a faculty of Hanoi University of Science until 2010. In 2010, the name High School for Gifted Students was officially used with the establishment of an independent high school under the direct administration of HUS school board instead of each separate faculty.

In the National Science Olympiad, each of the departments chooses 10 talented students to represent VNU University of Science.

Current school board:

- Principal: Lê Công Lợi, PhD.
- Deputy Principals:
  - Phạm Văn Quốc, PhD.
  - Vi Anh Tuấn, PhD.

== Facilities ==
=== Campus ===
The HUS High school for Gifted Students is located on Me Tri Campus, at 182nd Luong The Vinh Str., Thanh Xuân District, Hanoi. The campus comprises three buildings: the Main Building with 12 classrooms and the school office; the C3 building with offices of departments, laboratories and computer rooms; and the B1 building with some other classrooms. For all places on the campus, WiFi is available for both students and teachers.

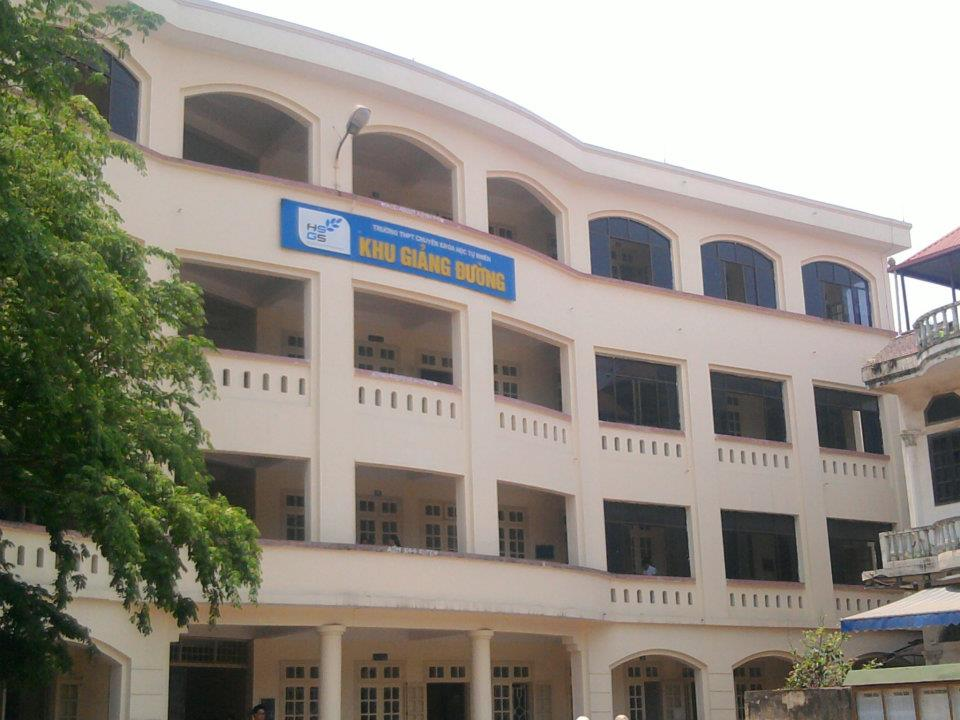
The main building of school

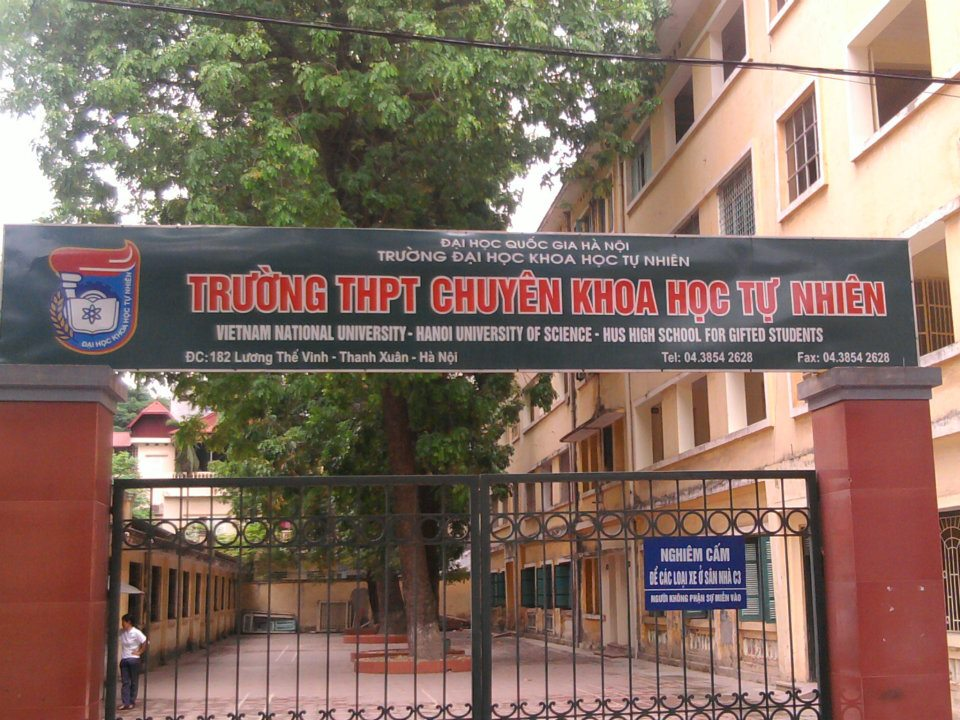
The C3 building

=== Library ===
Students use Me Tri library of Vietnam National University, Hanoi for studying.

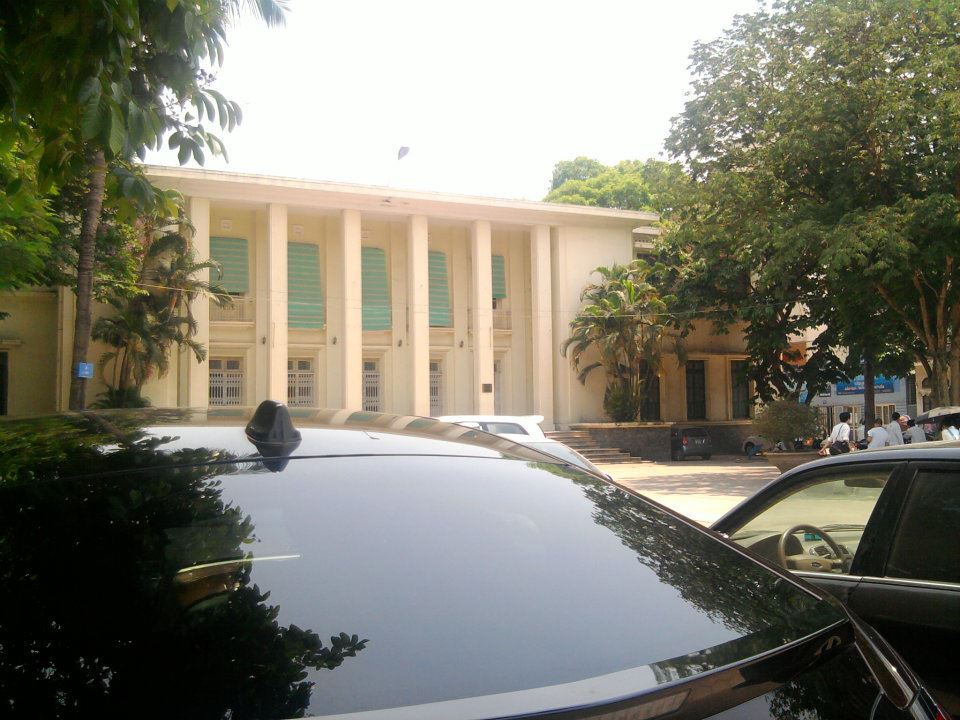
Me Tri library

=== Multipurpose Court ===
The school uses the multipurpose court of Hanoi University of Science to organize physical education exercise and other sports activities.

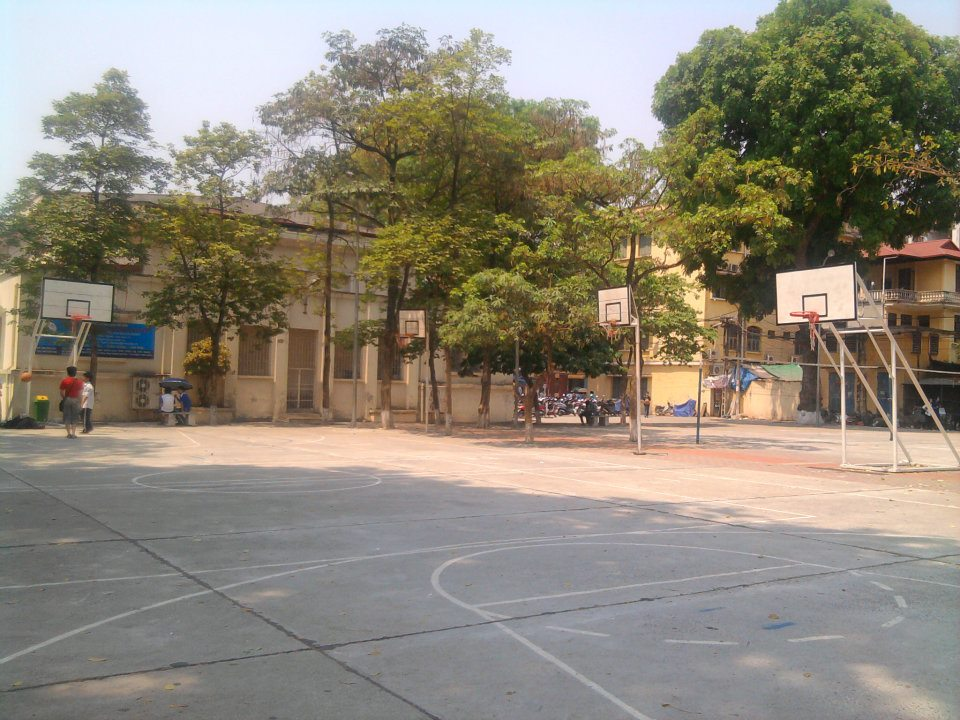
The basketball court on Me Tri Campus

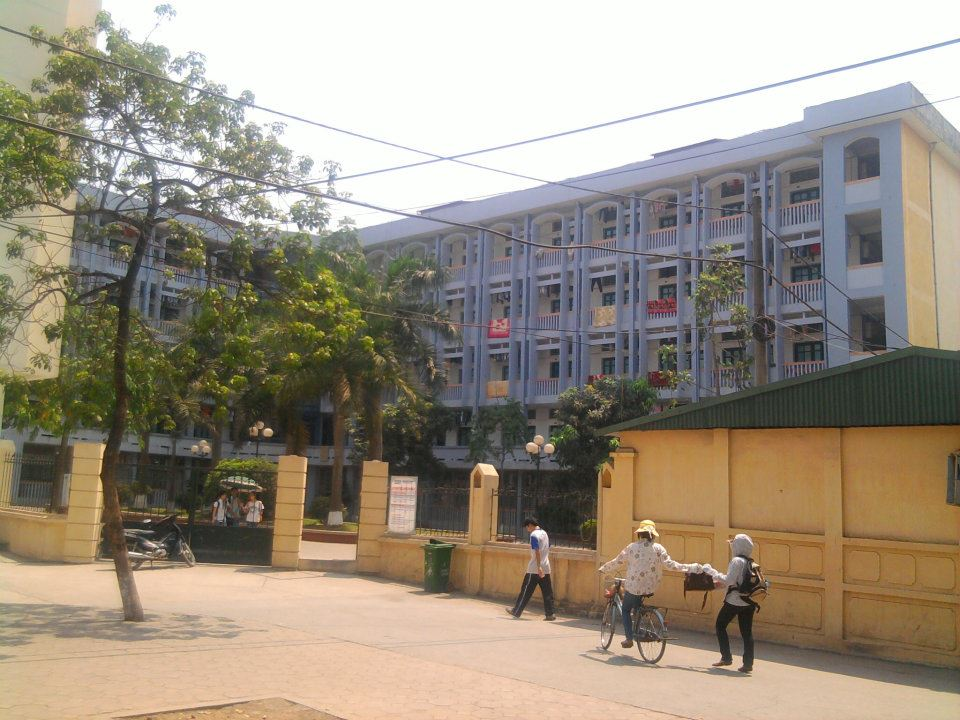
The B1 Building

== Notable alumni ==
Academia

- Ngô Bảo Châu, Professor of Mathematics, University of Chicago, Clay Research Award (2004), Fields Medal (2010).
- Đàm Thanh Sơn, Professor of Physics, University of Chicago, formerly of University of Washington.
- Trần Xuân Bách, Professor, Johns Hopkins Bloomberg School of Public Health, Noam Chomsky Award (2020).
- Hà Huy Tài, Chair of Mathematics Department, Tulane University.
- Lê Hùng Việt Bảo, Professor of Mathematics, Northwestern University.
- Cao Vũ Dân, Professor of Economics, Georgetown University.
- Nguyễn Minh Hoài, Professor of Computer Science, Stony Brook University.
- Phùng Hồ Hải, Director of Institute of Mathematics Hanoi (IMH).
- Prof. Dr Đào Trọng Thi, former president of Vietnam National University, Hanoi (2001–2007).

Government

- Prof. Dr. Trần Văn Nhung, former vice-minister of Ministry of Education and Training.
- Assoc. Prof. Dr. Bùi Thế Duy, vice-minister of Ministry of Science and Technology.

Business

- Nguyễn Thành Nam, former general director of FPT Group.

== Achievements ==
=== College admission ===
99% of HUS High school students pass the annual university entrance examination and are admitted to universities in Vietnam. The average entrance score of HUS High school students is always high on top of Vietnam, with HNUE High school for gifted students, Hanoi-Amsterdam High School, VNU-HCM High School for the Gifted

=== National Olympiads ===
Every year, the HUS High school attended the National Olympiads representing Vietnam National University, Hanoi and received about 50 prizes.

=== International Olympiads ===
==== International Mathematical Olympiad ====
- 16th IMO in German Democratic Republic (1974):
  - Hoang Le Minh: Gold medal
  - Dang Hoang Trung: Bronze medal
- 17th IMO in Bulgaria (1975):
  - Nguyen Minh Duc: Silver medal
  - Phan Vu Diem Hang: Bronze medal
  - Nguyen Long: Bronze medal
- 18th IMO in Austria (1976):
  - Nguyen Thi Thieu Hoa: Silver medal
- 21st IMO in United Kingdom (1979):
  - Pham Ngoc Anh Cuong: Silver medal
- 23rd IMO in Hungary (1982):
  - Tran Minh: Silver medal
  - Nguyen Huu Hoan: Bronze medal
- 25th IMO in Czechoslovakia (1984):
  - Đàm Thanh Sơn: Gold medal
- 26th IMO in Finland (1985):
  - Nguyen Tien Dung: Gold medal
- 27th IMO in Poland (1986):
  - Nguyen Tuan Trung: Bronze medal
  - Phung Ho Hai: Bronze medal
- 28th IMO in Cuba (1987):
  - Doan Quoc Chien: Bronze medal
  - Nguyen Huu Tuan: Bronze medal
- 29th IMO in Australia (1988):
  - Ngô Bảo Châu: Gold medal
- 30th IMO in Germany (1989):
  - Ngô Bảo Châu: Gold medal
  - Bui Hai Hung: Silver medal
  - Ha Huy Minh: Bronze medal
- 31st IMO in China (1990):
  - Pham Xuan Du: Silver medal
- 32nd IMO in Sweden (1991):
  - Ha Huy Tai: Silver medal
  - Nguyen Hai Ha: Bronze medal
- 33rd IMO in Russia (1992):
  - Nguyen Xuan Dao: Gold medal
  - Nguyen Quoc Khanh: Silver medal
  - Nguyen Thanh Cong: Silver medal
  - Nguyen Thuy Linh: Bronze medal
- 34th IMO in Turkey (1993):
  - Nguyen Chu Gia Vuong: Gold medal
- 35th IMO in Hong Kong (1994):
  - Dao Hai Long: Gold medal
  - Tran Ngoc Nam: Silver medal
  - Nguyen Quy Tuan: Silver medal
  - Nguyen Chu Gia Vuong: Silver medal
  - To Dong Vu: Silver medal
- 36th IMO in Canada (1995):
  - Ngo Dac Tuan: Gold medal
  - Dao Hai Long: Gold medal
  - Nguyen The Trung: Silver medal
  - Pham Quang Tuan: Silver medal
- 37th IMO in India (1996):
  - Ngo Dac Tuan: Gold medal
  - Nguyen Thai Ha: Gold medal
  - Pham Le Hung: Silver medal
  - Do Quoc Anh: Bronze medal
- 38th IMO in Argentina (1997):
  - Do Quoc Anh: Gold medal
  - Pham Le Hung: Silver medal
  - Nguyễn Ánh Tu: Silver medal
- 39th IMO in Taiwan (1998):
  - Pham Huy Tung: Silver medal
  - Dao Thi Thu Ha: Bronze medal
- 40th IMO in Romania (1999):
  - Bui Manh Hung: Gold medal
  - Pham Tran Quan: Silver medal
  - Nguyen Trung Tu: Silver medal
- 41st IMO in South Korea (2000):
  - Bui Viet Loc: Gold medal
  - Nguyen Minh Hoai: Gold medal
  - Do Duc Nhat Quang: Gold medal
  - Cao Vu Dan: Silver medal
- 42nd IMO in United States (2001):
  - Le Anh Vinh: Silver medal
- 43rd IMO in United Kingdom (2002):
  - Pham Hong Viet: Silver medal
- 44th IMO in Japan (2003):
  - Le Hung Viet Bao: Gold medal
- 45th IMO in Greece (2004):
  - Pham Kim Hung: Gold medal
  - Le Hung Viet Bao: Gold medal
- 46th IMO in Mexico (2005):
  - Pham Kim Hung: Silver medal
  - Nguyen Truong Tho: Bronze medal
- 47th IMO in Slovenia (2006):
  - Hoang Manh Hung: Gold medal
  - Dang Bao Duc: Bronze medal
- 48th IMO in Vietnam (2007):
  - Pham Duy Tung: Gold medal
- 50th IMO in Germany (2009):
  - Ha Khuong Duy: Gold medal
- 51st IMO in Kazakhstan (2010):
  - Vu Dinh Long: Silver medal
  - Nguyen Minh Hieu: Bronze medal
- 54th IMO in Colombia (2013):
  - Tran Dang Phuc: Silver medal
- 55th IMO in Chile (2014):
  - Nguyen The Hoan: Gold Medal
- 56th IMO in Thailand (2015):
  - Nguyen The Hoan: Gold Medal
  - Nguyen Tuan Hai Dang: Silver Medal

There are seven (7) students who won two gold medals: Ngô Bảo Châu (1988–89), Dao Hai Long (1994–95), Ngo Dac Tuan (1995–96), Vu Ngoc Minh (2001–2002), Le Hung Viet Bao (2003–04), Pham Tuan Huy (2013–2014), Nguyen The Hoan (2014–2015) and 5 students scored 42/42 point (the highest point): Đàm Thanh Sơn (1984), Ngô Bảo Châu (1988), Ngo Dac Tuan (1995), Do Quoc Anh (1997), Le Hung Viet Bao (2003).

==== Asian Pacific Mathematics Olympiad ====
- 1995-1996:
  - Ngo Dac Tuan: Gold medal
  - Nguyễn Ánh Tu: Silver medal
  - Nguyen Ba Hung: Bronze medal
  - Mai Phu Son: Bronze medal
  - Nguyễn Hoàng Dụong: Bronze medal
  - Dinh Thanh Trung: Bronze medal
- 2000-2001:
  - Le Anh Vinh: Gold medal
  - Tran Minh Quan: Bronze medal

==== International Olympiad in Informatics ====
- 1st IOI in Bulgaria (1989):
  - Nguyễn Anh Linh: Bronze medal
- 2nd IOI in USSR (1990):
  - Tran Hoai Linh: Silver medal
  - Nguyễn Anh Linh: Bronze medal
  - Nguyen Viet Ha: Bronze medal
- 3rd IOI in Greece (1991):
  - Dam Hieu Chi: Bronze medal
- 4th IOI in Germany (1992):
  - Ha Cong Thanh: Bronze medal
  - Le Van Tri: Bronze medal
- 5th IOI in Argentina (1993):
  - Pham Viet Thang: Bronze medal
- 6th IOI in Sweden (1994):
  - Truong Xuan Nam: Silver medal
  - Tran Minh Chau: Silver medal
  - Pham Bao Son: Silver medal
- 7th IOI in Netherlands (1995):
  - Pham Bao Son: Silver medal
  - Bui The Duy: Bronze medal
- 8th IOI in Hungary (1996):
  - Bui The Duy: Bronze medal
  - Nguyen Thuc Duong: Bronze medal
- 9th IOI in South Africa (1997):
  - Vuong Phan Tuan: Silver medal
- 10th IOI in Portugal (1998):
  - Tran Tuan Anh: Bronze medal
- 11th IOI in Turkey (1999):
  - Nguyen Ngoc Huy: Gold medal
- 12th IOI in China (2000):
  - Nguyen Ngoc Huy: Gold medal
  - Pham Kim Cuong: Silver medal
- 14th IOI in South Korea (2002):
  - Nguyen Van Hieu: Silver medal
- 15th IOI in United States (2003):
  - Nguyen Le Huy: Gold medal
  - Cao Thanh Tung: Silver medal
  - Pham Tran Duc: Bronze medal
  - Dinh Ngoc Thang: Bronze medal
- 16th IOI in Greece (2004):
  - Le Manh Ha: Bronze medal
- 18th IOI in Mexico (2005):
  - Tran Tuan Linh: Bronze medal
- 19th IOI in Croatia (2007):
  - Doan Manh Hung: Silver medal
  - Nguyen Hoanh Tien: Bronze medal
- 23rd IOI in Thailand (2011):
  - Nguyen Vuong Linh: Gold medal
  - Le Khac Minh Tue: Silver medal
- 24th IOI in Italy (2012):
  - Vu Dinh Quang Dat: Silver medal
- 25th IOI in Australia (2013):
  - Duong Thanh Dat: Silver medal
- 26th IOI in Taiwan (2014)
  - Ngo Hoang Anh Phuc: Silver medal
  - Do Xuan Viet: Bronze medal
  - Nguyen Tien Trung Kien: Bronze medal
- 27th IOI in Kazakhstan (2015)
  - Pham Van Hanh, Gold medal
  - Phan Duc Nhat Minh, Silver medal
  - Nguyen Viet Dung, Silver medal
  - Nguyen Tien Trung Kien: Silver medal
- 28th IOI in Russia (2016)
  - Phan Duc Nhat Minh, Gold medal
  - Pham Cao Nguyen, Gold medal
- 29th IOI in Iran (2017)
  - Pham Cao Nguyen, Bronze medal
- 30th IOI in Japan (2018)
  - Pham Duc Thang, Gold medal
  - Nguyen Hoang Hai Minh, Bronze medal
  - Nguyen Khanh, Bronze medal
- 31st IOI in Azerbaijan (2019)
  - Bui Hong Duc, Gold medal
  - Vu Hoang Kien, Silver medal
  - Nguyen Minh Tung, Bronze medal
- 32nd IOI in Singapore (2020)
  - Bui Hong Duc, Gold medal
  - Vu Hoang Kien, Silver medal
  - Le Quang Huy, Silver medal
- 33rd IOI in Singapore (2021)
  - Le Quang Huy, Silver medal
- 34th IOI in Indonesia (2022)
  - Tran Xuan Bach, Gold medal
  - Duong Minh Khoi, Silver medal
- 35th IOI in Hungary (2023)
  - Khoa Nguyen Ngoc Dang, Gold medal
  - Minh Nguyen Quang, Bronze medal
- 36th IOI in Egypt (2024)
  - Pham Cong Minh, Gold medal
  - Xuan Bach Hoang, Gold medal
  - Huu Tuan Nguyen, Silver medal
  - Ngoc Trung Pham, Bronze medal

==== International Physics Olympiad ====
- 24th IPhO in United States (1993):
  - Thai Thanh Minh: Bronze medal
- 26th IPhO in Australia (1995):
  - Vo Van Duc: Silver medal
  - Tran The Trung: Bronze medal
- 27th IPhO in Norway (1996):
  - Tran The Trung: Gold medal
  - Nguyen Duc Trung Kien: Silver medal
  - Nguyen Quang Hung: Silver medal
- 28th IPhO in Canada (1997):
  - Nguyen Duc Trung Kien: Silver medal
  - Pham Tuan Minh: Bronze medal
  - Bui Van Diep: Bronze medal
- 29th IPhO in Iceland (1998):
  - Vu Tri Khu: Bronze medal
  - Bui Van Diep: Bronze medal
  - Nguyen Trung Thanh: Bronze medal
- 30th IPhO in Italy (1999):
  - Ngo Quang Tien: Silver medal
  - Nguyen Thanh Lam: Silver medal
  - Pham Xuan Thanh: Silver medal
  - Dao Tung Lam: Silver medal
  - Nguyen Thanh Trung: Bronze medal
- 31st IPhO in United Kingdom (2000):
  - Tran Việt Bắc: Bronze medal
- 32nd IPhO in Turkey (2001):
  - Nguyen Bao Trung: Gold medal
  - Dang Ngoc Duong: Bronze medal
- 33rd IPhO in Indonesia (2002):
  - Dang Ngoc Duong: Gold medal
  - Luong Tuan Thanh: Silver medal
  - Nguyen Huy Thanh: Bronze medal
- 34th IPhO in Taiwan (2003):
  - Nguyen Huu Thuan: Bronze medal
- 35th IPhO in South Korea (2004):
  - Nguyen Hai Chau: Silver medal
  - Trinh Hong Phuc: Bronze medal
- 36th IPhO in Spain (2005):
  - Nguyen Minh Hai: Silver medal
  - Van Sy Chien: Bronze medal
  - Nguyen Quang Huy: Bronze medal
- 37th IPhO in Singapore (2006):
  - Tran Xuan Quy: Bronze medal
- 38th IPhO in Iran (2007):
  - Do Hoang Anh: Silver medal
- 39th IPhO in Vietnam (2008):
  - Do Hoang Anh: Gold medal
- 45th IPhO in Kazakhstan (2014):
  - Do Thi Bich Hue: Gold medal
  - Dao Phuong Khoi: Silver medal
- 48th IPhO in Indonesia (2017):
  - Ta Ba Dung: Gold medal
- International distributed Physics Olympiad in Russia (2020):
  - Vu Ngo Hoang Duong: Silver medal
  - Le Minh Hoang: Silver medal
  - Trang Dao Cong Minh: Silver medal
- 51st IPhO in Lithuania (2021):
  - Trang Dao Cong Minh: Gold medal
- 52nd IPhO in Switzerland (2022):
  - Le Minh Hoang: Gold medal
  - Vu Ngo Hoang Duong: Gold medal
  - Vo Hoang Hai: Gold medal

==== International Chemistry Olympiad ====
- 29th IChO in Canada (1997):
  - Nguyen Ngoc Bao: Silver medal
- 35th IChO in Greece (2003):
  - Vu Viet Cuong: Bronze medal
- 36th IChO in Germany (2004):
  - Vu Viet Cuong: Silver medal
  - Nguyen Mai Luan: Silver medal
  - Ha Minh Tu: Bronze medal
- 37th IChO in Taiwan (2005):
  - Nguyen Mai Luan: Gold medal
  - Nguyễn Hoàng Minh: Gold medal
  - Nguyen Huy Viet: Silver medal
- 38th IChO in South Korea (2006):
  - Đang Tien Duc: Gold medal
  - Tu Ngoc Ly Lan: Gold medal
  - Nguyễn Hoàng Minh: Silver medal
- 39th IChO in Russia (2007):
  - Nguyen Thi Ngoc Minh: Gold medal
- 40th IChO in Hungary (2008):
  - Vu Minh Chau: Gold medal
  - Pham Anh Tuan: Bronze medal
- 41st IChO in United Kingdom (2009):
  - Vu Minh Chau: Gold medal
- 45th IChO in Russia (2013):
  - Phan Quang Dung: Gold medal
  - Ho Quang Khai: Silver medal
  - Nguyen Quoc Anh: Silver medal
- 48th IChO in Georgia (country) (2016):
  - Đinh Quang Hieu: Gold medal
- 49th IChO in Thailand (2017)
  - Đinh Quang Hieu: Gold medal
  - Pham Đuc Anh: Gold medal
- 50th IChO in Czech Republic and Slovakia (2018)
  - Pham Đuc Anh: Gold medal
- 52nd IChO in Turkey (Virtually conducted) (2020)
  - Nguyen Hoang Duong: Gold medal
- 53rd IChO in Japan (Virtually conducted) (2021)
  - Nguyen Hoang Duong: Silver medal

==== International Biology Olympiad ====
- 12th IBO in Brussels, Belgium (2001):
  - Nguyen Anh Vu: Bronze medal
  - Nguyen Kim Nu Thao: Bronze medal
- 13th IBO in Jūrmala-Riga, Latvia (2002)
  - Nguyen Van Nhuong: Bronze medal
- 14th IBO in Minsk, Belarus (2003)
  - Tran Thu Huong: Bronze medal
  - Nguyen Minh Huong: Bronze medal
- 16th IBO in Beijing, China (2005)
  - Nghiem Viet Dung: Bronze medal
  - Do Thi Hong Van: Bronze medal
- 17th IBO in Río Cuarto, Argentina (2006)
  - Tran Thi Thu Thuy: Bronze medal
- 18th IBO in Saskatoon, Canada (2007)
  - Duong Thi Thu Phuong: Bronze medal
- 20th IBO in Tsukuba, Japan (2009)
  - Nguyen Thi Thuy Trang: Silver medal
- 24th IBO in Bern, Switzerland (2013):
  - Nguyen Quang Huy: Bronze medal
- 27th IBO in Hanoi, Vietnam (2016):
  - Vu Thi Chinh: Gold Medal
- 28th IBO in Coventry, England (2017)
  - Nguyen Phuong Thao: Silver medal
- 29th IBO in Shiraz, Iran (2018)
  - Nguyen Phuong Thao: Gold medal (1st place)
- 30th IBO in Szeged, Hungary (2019)
  - Ha Vu Huyen Linh: Bronze medal
- 31th IBO in Nagasaki, Japan (Virtually conducted as IBO challenge I) (2020):
  - Dong Ngoc Ha: Silver medal
  - Ha Vu Huyen Linh: Bronze Medal
- 34th IBO in Dubai, UAE (2023)
  - Tran Pham Manh: Bronze Medal
