= Marcia France =

Marcia Beth France
- Citizenship: American
- Education: Massachusetts Institute of Technology (SB); Yale University (MS); California Institute of Technology (PhD)
- Scientific career
- Fields: Chemistry
- Workplaces: Fulbright University Vietnam, Duke Kunshan University, Washington and Lee University
- Thesis: Olefin Metathesis with Group VIII Transition Metal Complexes: Mechanism, Reactivity, and Catalyst Development
- Doctoral advisor: Robert H. Grubbs

Marcia France is an American academic and university administrator currently serving as Vice President for Academic Affairs and Provost at Fulbright University Vietnam. France previously served as the inaugural dean of undergraduate studies at Duke Kunshan University (DKU) in China. Prior to her appointment at DKU, she served as an associate provost and John T. Herwick, M.D. Professor of Chemistry at Washington and Lee University, where she is currently on a five-year leave.

France received degrees in chemistry from the Massachusetts Institute of Technology and Yale University, and her PhD in organic chemistry from the California Institute of Technology.

France taught at W&L from 1994 to 2018. She was appointed as dean at Duke Kunshan on August 1, 2018, and has overseen the launch of the university's undergraduate program. France was appointed as vice president at Fulbright University Vietnam on July 1, 2024.

== Selected works ==
- A Series of Well‐Defined Metathesis Catalysts–Synthesis of [RuCl_{2}(CHR′)(PR_{3})_{2}] and Its Reactions Angewandte Chemie, 1995
- The carbonyl ene reaction Tetrahedron, 2008
