= Scott Fritzen =

Scott Andrew Fritzen

2nd President of Fulbright University Vietnam
- Incumbent
- Assumed office July 1, 2023
- Preceded by: Đàm Bích Thủy

Personal details
- Education: Michigan State University (BA); Princeton University (MA, PhD)

Scott Fritzen is an American university administrator currently serving as the 2nd President of Fulbright University Vietnam since 2023. Fritzen previously served as dean of the David L. Boren College of International Studies and associate provost for Global Engagement at the University of Oklahoma. Fritzen was the first American to be awarded a Fulbright scholarship in Vietnam in the post-war era.

== Career ==
=== Fulbright University Vietnam ===
Fritzen was appointed President of Fulbright University Vietnam in 2023. In 2024, Fulbright was subjected to an online disinformation campaign.
