= FETP =

FETP may refer to:

- Field Epidemiology Training Program
- Fulbright Economics Teaching Program
