= Lê Văn Thiêm =

Vietnamese scientist

- Born: 29 March 1918; Đức Thọ, Vietnam
- Died: 3 July 1991 (aged 73); Ho Chi Minh City
- Occupation: Mathematician

Academic background
- Education: University of Göttingen
- Doctoral advisor: Hans Wittich

Lê Văn Thiêm (29 March 1918 – 3 July 1991) was a Vietnamese scientist. Together with Hoàng Tụy, he is considered the father of Vietnam Mathematics society. He was the first director of the Vietnam Institute of Mathematics, and the first Headmaster of Hanoi National University of Education and Hanoi University of Science.

== Biography ==
Lê Văn Thiêm was born in 1918 at Trung Lễ Commune, Đức Thọ District, Hà Tĩnh Province, to an intellectual family. He was the youngest of 13 brothers and sisters. After the death of his parents in 1930, he moved to live with his older brother in Quy Nhơn and attended the Collège de Quy Nhơn, where Thiêm stood out in science and mathematics. Within four years, he had completed the 9-year education (equivalent to K-12 system of the US) and went to University of Indochina for his higher education. Because of the humble scale of the university at that moment, no Math course was offered. Therefore, he enrolled in the PCB (Physics-Chemistry-Biology) class.

In 1939, after passing the final term examination excellently, Thiêm was offered a scholarship to study at École Normale Supérieure. His education was interrupted by the outbreak of the Second World War, and only resumed in 1941. He graduated with a bachelor's degree of Mathematics within a year, rather than the conventional 3-year time. Under the direction of Professor Georges Valiron, he defended his Ph.D. dissertation successfully in Germany in 1945 and then moved to the University of Zurich where he met and worked with Rolf Herman Nevanlinna for some years. His contributions in Paris and Zurich placed him among the best researchers in mathematics in the 1940s.

He represented Vietnam at the 1948 World Peace Conference in Poland.

In 1949, following the call of Hồ Chí Minh, Thiêm returned to Vietnam to support the war of decolonizing Vietnam. Moving through many positions in North Vietnam's science institutions and government, in the mid-1950s he was appointed headmaster of the National University of Advanced Education and School of Basic Science (now the Hanoi National University of Education and the Hanoi University of Science, Vietnam National University, Hanoi).

In the 1960s, he was one of the scientists who suggested opening two national high schools (Hanoi National University of Education High school and Hanoi University of Science) to foster Vietnamese mathematics talents.

In 1970 he became the first director of the Vietnam Institute of Mathematics. Later, he founded and was first editor-in-chief of two of Vietnam's Mathematical Journals: Acta Mathematica Vietnamica (in Latin) and Vietnam Journal of Mathematics (in English). He was the host of Neal Koblitz in his lectures in Vietnam.

Lê Văn Thiêm died in 1991 in Hồ Chí Minh City, aged 73.

== Public recognition ==
Awards:

- The 3rd degree Nation Liberation Decoration
- The 2nd degree Labor Decoration
- The Order of Independence
- Hồ Chí Minh Award

A scholarship for Young Vietnamese Mathematics Talents was named after him.

The University of St Andrews in Scotland created the Lê Văn Thiêm Award in 1989.

He was the first Modern Mathematician of Vietnam to have his name used for a street (in Hanoi).
