= High School for Gifted Students, Hanoi National University of Education =

Coordinates: 21°02′16″N 105°47′02″E

HNUE High School for Gifted Students
- Trường Trung học phổ thông chuyên Đại học Sư phạm

Location
- 136 Xuan Thuy Str. Cầu Giấy, Hanoi; Vietnam

Information
- Type: Public
- Established: 1966
- Principal: Dr. Vũ Minh Tiến
- Faculty: 80
- Grades: 10-12
- Enrollment: 1500
- Website: chuyensp.edu.vn

The HNUE High School for Gifted Students (Vietnamese: Trường Trung học phổ thông chuyên Đại học Sư phạm), commonly known as HNUE High School (Vietnamese: Chuyên Sư phạm, CSP), is a public magnet school in Hanoi, Vietnam. The school was founded in 1966 as a national educational institution to nurture Vietnamese students who excelled at mathematics. HNUE High School is the second oldest magnet high school in Vietnam and one of the seven national-level high schools for the gifted.

The school and HUS High School for Gifted Students are often interchangeably ranked the first in National Science Olympiads for high school students and National University Entrance Examinations. Its students have won about 100 medals at the International Science Olympiads. Its alumni include 4 ministers in the Vietnamese governments, leading scientists at top domestic and foreign universities, notable Vietnamese entrepreneurs and recognized artists.

HNUE High School is the most selective school in Vietnam. The 2022 acceptance rate is 5.5% (1 seat for every 18 applicants) and for the English class, the acceptance rate is 3% (1 slot for every 31 applicants). Students are chosen either through exceptional academic achievement in junior secondary school (10% of intake) or through a rigorous nationwide entrance exam (90%).

The school’s alumni include key leaders at the Ministry of Foreign Affairs of Vietnam, the Ministry of Information and Communications of Vietnam, Vietnam National University, Ho Chi Minh City, Hanoi Medical University, Vietnam Academy of Science and Technology, researchers and professors at Oxford University, MIT, Stanford University, NASA, National University of Singapore, Sorbonne University, Microsoft, Google... business leaders and founders of McKinsey & Company, Sabeco, Bkav (company), FPT Corporation, Gemadept...

== Foundation and history ==
During the Vietnam War, aware of the important role of sciences for future of the country, a group of Vietnam leading scientists including Lê Văn Thiêm, Hoàng Tụy and Tạ Quang Bửu suggested that the government open up selective programs to nurture talented students, and to encourage them to follow science in their later years at universities and professions. As a premier national institution for training of science teachers, Hanoi National University of Education was selected to organize such a program. On December 24, 1966, at the height of the Vietnam War, the first class for gifted students was inaugurated with 33 mathematically inclined students, who were chosen from thousands of high school students in North Vietnam, at the evacuation site of the university in Phù Cừ District, Hưng Yên Province. This class was the foundation of HNUE High School.

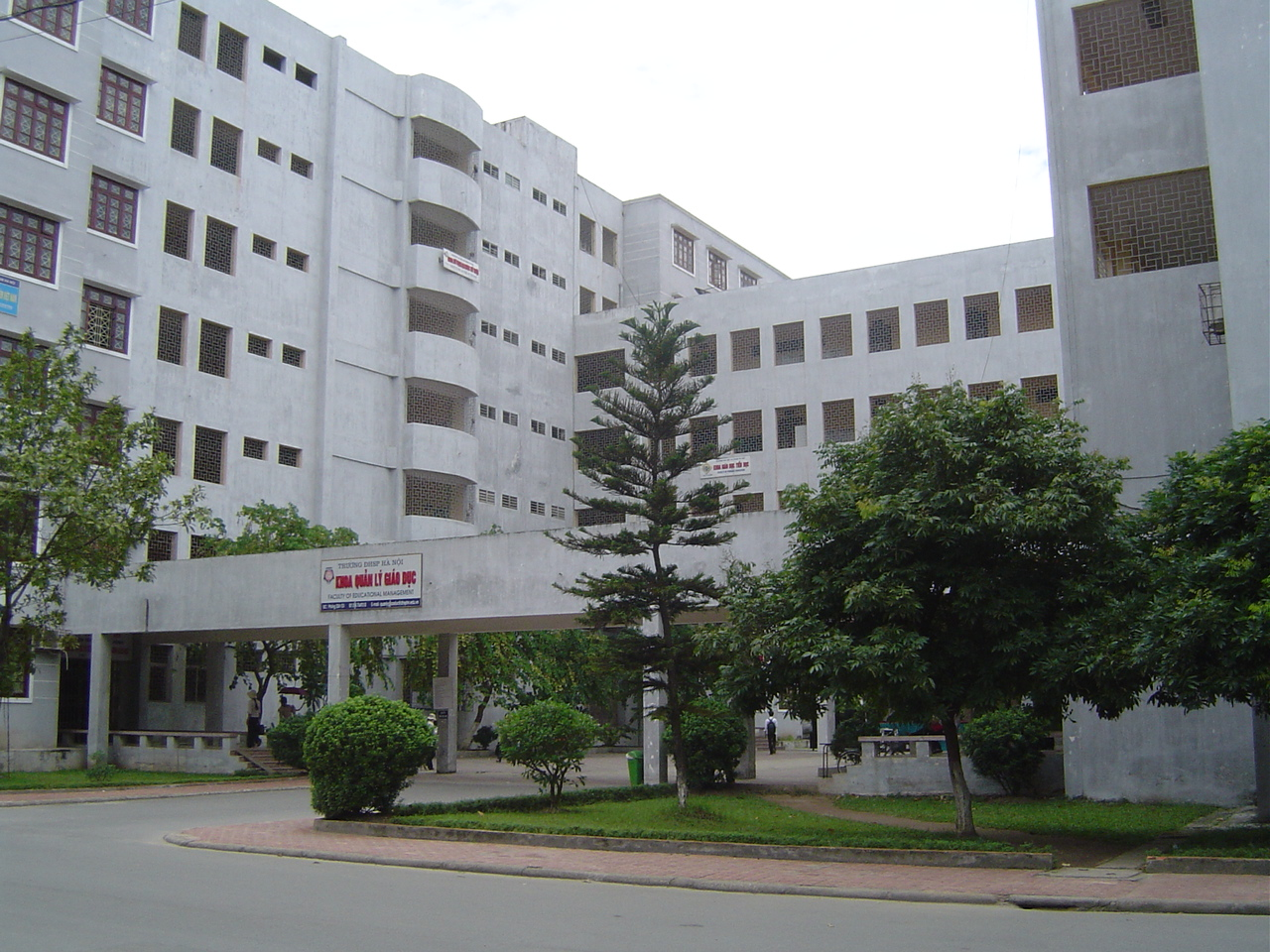
HNUE High School main building

The history of Hanoi National University of Education High School is divided three periods:

- From 1966 to 1995, the special math classes were under the administration of the faculty of Mathematics, Hanoi National University of Education.
- In 1995, the school expanded to include a specialized stream in Computer Science. It was then renamed Specialized School for Maths and Computer Science.
- In 2005, the school started offering classes specialized in Literature, Physics, Chemistry and Biology and was named "High School for Gifted Students of Hanoi National University of Education".

The HNUE High School was honored with many national awards, including the third degree Labor Decoration award in 1986, the second degree Labor Decoration in 1996, and most recently the first degree Labor Decoration (2001).

== Education ==
=== Admissions ===
In the first period of establishment of the school in the 80s, HNUE High School for Gifted Students did not directly handle the admission process; this work was taken by the Ministry of Education and Training. During this period, students with outstanding abilities in mathematics (only in Northern region, from Nam Dinh province northwards) were nominated by the region to the Ministry of Education and Training before participating in an entrance exam. Students who passed the exam would be divided two schools: High School for Gifted Students, Hanoi University of Science and HNUE High School for Gifted Students or HSGS High School for Gifted Students. Since the end of 1980, with the wave of eradication of subsidy mechanism, HNUE High School for Gifted Students and HSGS High School for Gifted Students directly handle their own admission process.

The school's entrance examinations are held in June, attracts students from all over the country. Candidates must take two compulsory papers (Vietnamese language, Mathematics) and one elective paper (from Mathematics, Literature, Physics, Chemistry, Biology, English studies, Informatics, Geography) for their specialization. These exams are highly competitive.

=== Education model ===
The students are organized into specialized streams in one of the following subjects: Mathematics, Literature, Physics, Chemistry, Biology, Computer Science and English. Each stream is offered an accelerated curriculum on the subject of specialization. Seminars are held during the school year, at which students can discuss with national and international scientists and researchers.

Extra-curricular activities include sports, camping and clubs.

=== Teaching staff ===
Members of the staff often provide annual training for national Olympiad teams for international competitions, and have been consulted for developing textbooks and curriculum for Vietnamese national high school education. In addition, many have received the Excellent Teacher Award from the government for their dedication to education.

== Facilities ==
As many students come from provinces far away from the main campus in Hanoi, the school provides room and board.The school has built a spacious facility with 40 classrooms, 2 Informatics practice rooms, an English classroom, 3 laboratories for subjects: Physics, Chemistry, Biology with full necessary equipment, one multi room...

=== Classrooms ===
The main building of the school contains 24 classrooms and a multi-media room. Wireless internet access is available across the entire building.

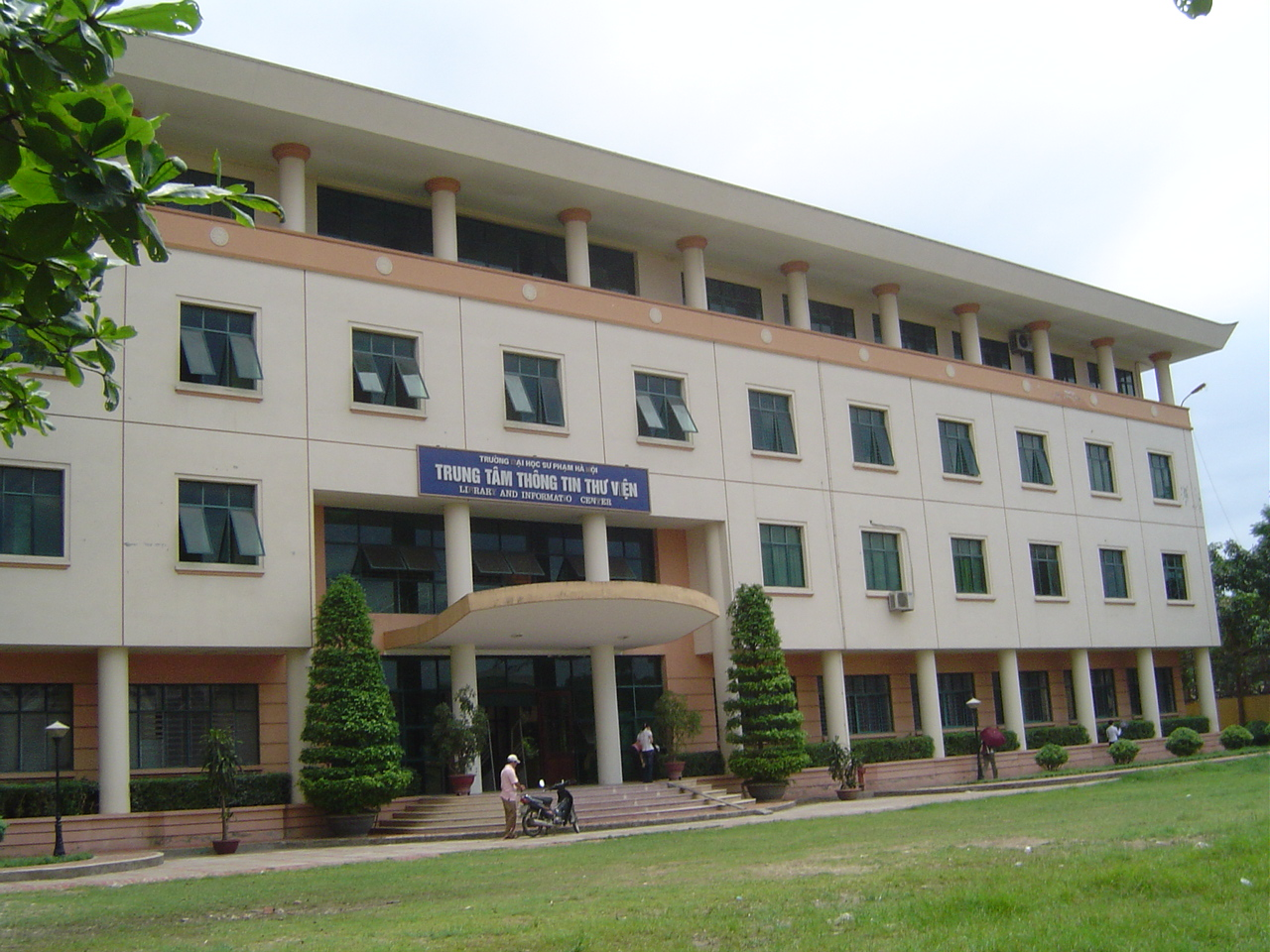
The library

=== Library ===
Built in 2001, it meets the demand for reference and study material for teachers and students. It has hundreds of computers for internet access, along with spacious media rooms.

=== Laboratories ===
There are two computer rooms where students practice Computer Science or use for study and reference or entertaining. Because of space shortage, the school does not have lab space for physics, chemistry and biology experiments, but the students are given access to facilities on the university main campus.

=== Dormitories ===
The school provides students with dormitories. The residents have access to a canteen and an internet access point.

=== Stadium ===
The students use Hanoi National University of Education stadium for physical education and sport events.

== Student life ==
=== PTCMedia ===
PTCMedia is the official media organization of HNUE High School. With the mission of reporting the details of the internal academic aspect and activities of students, as well as encouraging the student connections by organizing various events, PTCMedia has always been creative and critical to bringing the best to students. Our initial product is PTCTimes, the newspaper of HNUE High School. The first issue was published in December 2006. There are approximately 60 pages in each issue. A number of pages are always devoted to difficulties in studying. Each newspaper has an interview with a teacher or student. The recreation column deals with music, games, and sport. Besides print media, PTC also directs and provides digital products that demonstrate all sides of HNUE High School.

Events are an important part of PTCMedia's annual activities. The organization is behind the success of various events for students in all class standing. Fiesta A Cielo is currently the biggest event at HNUE High School, which normally lasts 2 weeks to 1 month. This is an opportunity for different classes to compete and have fun in sports, academics, games, and so on. Throughout different seasons, Fiesta A Cielo carries the virtues of a well-development environment for students, as well as representing the strength of HNUE High School students in all fields.

PTC Media is the oldest club in CSP.

=== SAGS ===
SAGS is the abbreviation for "Studying Abroad for Gifted Students" - the organization concerning studying abroad orientation and English learning development. Founded in 2008, SAGS has created many helpful and interesting activities:

- Founded and has administrated an English club since 2009.
- Administrating two pages on Facebook: "The ySAGS" and "SAGS Studying Abroad for Gifted Students", which bring students helpful knowledge, information and video clips about studying abroad and learning English.
- Hosting major annual events: English speaking contest "U-talk", English singing contest "Stereo Hearts".
- Hosting many conferences on studying abroad with the presence of universities representatives, famous lecturers, etc. from all around the world such as Ebroad - Studying Abroad Orientation and Developing English through seminars.
- Holding and attending, supporting meaningful voluntary events: imFLOW (at National Institute of Hematology and Blood Transfusion), Youth Day (in Hanoi), Vitamin smile (at National Hospital of Pediatrics).
- Christmas free transporting cards and gifts program: "Christmas Hearts transporter".
- Annual prom on Halloween night called "The Corieme" which attracts more than 17,000 followers.
- Co-operating with other organizations to hold big events: LEMON's day (the biggest series of voluntary events in Hanoi by students), The Breakfast (annual orientation program for first year students), Puzzles (a debate club of Hanoi students), etc.

=== MCCM ===
A music club where students who are passionate about music can rehearse and share their interests in music. The club usually participates in school performances, as well as hosting its own music events.

=== ECLUB ===
With the slogan "English Can Lead U Beyond", ECLUB is the first and only English Club for students of CSP. The club has two main annual events: Fight the Krampus and Activate your Energy.

=== CDT ===
The abbreviation for "CSP Dance Team".

=== Movies for Relief ===
A charity organization and one of the biggest clubs of school, their annual activities are Spring Melody, Red Carpet and more.

=== CSF ===
CSF is the abbreviation for "CSP Sporting Federation", the first sports organization in the school history. Founded in 2013, CSF focuses on promoting three main sports, which are soccer, table tennis and badminton, holding both intramural and interscholastic competition for each sport. The winning teams will represent the school in the city tournaments.

=== C3 ===
C3 stands for "Chuyen Su pham (CSP) Cubing Club".

=== ASO ===
ASO is the abbreviation for "Apply Science Organization".

=== ADaPT ===
ADaPT is the first Information Technology club of HNUE High School, where students participate in assembling high-tech products and get experience with startup projects.

=== ET Magic ===
The first magic team where teammates can show their own skills in magic tricks.

=== HE ===
"HE" is the abbreviation for "History for Everyone", a history club founded in 2016 by Mrs Ninh Thị Lan Anh and Mrs Nguyễn Thị Thu Hà.

=== CDS ===
CDS is the abbreviation for "Chuyen Su Pham (CSP) Debate Society", the school's first debate club with the aim of sparking a wider interest in formal debating within the CSP student community. Founded in 2017, the club provides students with the opportunity to develop and utilize their critical thinking, research, discussion and presentation skills as well as preparing potential individuals to compete in local, regional, and national tournaments. It also holds its own debate tournaments and a summer program dedicated to teaching debating skills. CDS has gained popularity in light of the succeed of Warm-up Debating Championship

=== CCT ===
"CCT" is the abbreviation for "CSP Cooking Trendsetters", a culinary club founded in 2017.

=== Other extracurricular activities ===
- Camping or sightseeing: During the summer vacation, the school organizes short tours for students. These activities may be replaced by camping.
- Clubs: There are sport clubs, English club, physics club, mathematics club (online) and the Readle, a literature appreciation club, for students. The sport clubs, physics club and mathematics club were all founded in 2013–2014. The Readle focuses not only upon book discussion but also organises Slam Poetry sessions.

== Achievements ==
=== College admission ===
100% of HNUE High school students pass the annual National University Entrance Examination and are admitted to universities in Vietnam. The average entrant score of HNUE students is always one of the highest in the country. Additionally, the school has also produced several national top scorers.
After graduation, many students pursue higher education abroad and are scholars in world top universities.

In 2025, an English-specialized student of the school got admitted into 3 Ivy League universities (Harvard, Yale, Princeton).

=== SAT ===
In the 2024-25 school year, the school produced two students with a perfect SAT score (1600).

In the subsequent school year, the school had 8 students who achieved a perfect score, alongside numerous students with a score of above 1560.

=== National Olympiads ===
Since its foundation, the school has attended national merit competitions annually, and has received around 1000 prizes, with about 100 of them being first prizes. The school has also produced top scorers across multiple subjects, such as Maths (2023-24, 2024-25, 2025-26), Biology (2024-25, 2025-26), and English (2024-25).

=== International Olympiads ===
More than 50 students of the school have received high awards in international competitions, namely International Mathematics Olympiad (IMO), Asian Pacific Mathematics Olympiad (APMO), International Olympiad in Informatics (IOI), and International Biology Olympiad. Especially, Vu Ngoc Minh won two Gold medals (at the 42nd and 43rd IMO), Dinh Tien Cuong and Nguyen Trong Canh scored 42/42 point respectively at the 30th and 44th IMO.

==== International Mathematics Olympiad ====
- 16th International Mathematical Olympiad in German Democratic Republic in 1974
  - Vu Dinh Hoa " Silver medal
  - Ta Hong Quang " Bronze medal
- 17th International Mathematical Olympiad in Bulgaria in 1975
  - Le Dinh Long " Silver medal
- 18th International Mathematical Olympiad in Austria in 1976
  - Le Ngoc Minh " Bronze medal
- 20th International Mathematical Olympiad in Romania in 1978
  - Vu Kim Tuan " Silver medal
  - Nguyen Thanh Tung " Silver medal
  - Do Duc Thai " Bronze medal
- 21st International Mathematical Olympiad in the United Kingdom in 1979
  - Bui Ta Long " Silver medal
- 24th International Mathematical Olympiad in France in 1983
  - Tran Tuan Hiep " Silver medal
  - Pham Thanh Phuong " Bronze medal
- 25th International Mathematical Olympiad in Czechoslovakia in 1984
  - Do Quang Dai " Silver medal
- 27th International Mathematical Olympiad in Poland in 1986
  - Ha Anh Vu " Gold medal
  - Nguyen Phuong Tuan " Silver medal
- 28th International Mathematical Olympiad in Cuba in 1987
  - Tran Trong Hung " Silver medal
- 29th International Mathematical Olympiad in Australia in 1988
  - Tran Trong Hung " Silver medal
- 30th International Mathematical Olympiad in Germany in 1989
  - Dinh Tien Cuong " Gold medal (score 42/42)
- 31st International Mathematical Olympiad in China in 1990
  - Le Truong Lan " Bronze medal
- 32nd International Mathematical Olympiad in Sweden in 1991
  - Nguyen Viet Anh " Silver medal
- 33rd International Mathematical Olympiad in Russia in 1992
  - Nguyen Huu Cuong " Bronze medal
- 34th International Mathematical Olympiad in Turkey in 1993
  - Pham Hong Kien " Silver medal
  - Pham Chung Thuy " Bronze medal
- 35th International Mathematical Olympiad in Hong Kong in 1994
  - Nguyen Duy Lan " Silver medal
- 36th International Mathematical Olympiad in Canada in 1995
  - Nguyen The Phuong " Silver medal
- 39th International Mathematical Olympiad in Taiwan in 1998
  - Vu Viet Anh " Gold medal
  - Le Thai Hoang " Bronze medal
- 40th International Mathematical Olympiad in Romania in 1999
  - Le Thai Hoang " Gold medal
- 42nd International Mathematical Olympiad in the US in 2001
  - Vu Ngoc Minh " Gold medal
  - Tran Khanh Toan " Silver medal
- 43rd International Mathematical Olympiad in the United Kingdom in 2002
  - Pham Gia Vinh Anh " Gold medal
  - Vu Ngoc Minh " Gold medal
- 44th International Mathematical Olympiad in Japan in 2003
  - Nguyen Trong Canh " Gold medal (score 42/42)
- 45th International Mathematical Olympiad in Greece in 2004
  - Nguyen Kim Son " Gold medal
  - Nguyen Duc Thinh " Silver medal
  - Hua Khac Nam " Silver medal
- 46th International Mathematical Olympiad in Mexico in 2005
  - Nguyen Nguyen Hung " Bronze medal
- 49th International Mathematical Olympiad in Spain in 2008
  - Nguyen Pham Dat " Silver medal
- 53rd International Mathematical Olympiad in Argentina in 2012
  - Dau Hai Dang " Gold medal
  - Nguyen Ta Duy " Silver medal
  - Nguyen Phuong Minh " Silver medal
- 64th International Mathematical Olympiad in Japan in 2023
  - Hoang Tuan Dung " Silver medal
- 65th International Mathematical Olympiad in United Kingdom in 2024
  - Tran Duy " Silver medal
  - Ta Duc Anh " Honorable mention
- 67th International Mathematical Olympiad in China in 2026
  - Nguyen Le Nhat Nam " Gold medal

==== Asian Pacific Mathematics Olympiad ====
- 10th Asian Pacific Mathematics Olympiad
  - Vu Viet Anh " Bronze medal
- 11th Asian Pacific Mathematics Olympiad
  - Le Thai Hoang " Gold medal
- 13th Asian Pacific Mathematics Olympiad
  - Luu Tien Duc " Gold medal
- 14th Asian Pacific Mathematics Olympiad
  - Vu Hoang Hiep " Gold medal

==== International Chemistry Olympiad ====
- 57th International Chemistry Olympiad in United Arab Emirates (Dubai) in 2025
  - Nguyen Hoang Khoi " Gold medal

==== International Olympiad in Informatics ====
- 12th International Olympiad in Informatics in Turkey in 1999
  - Nguyen Hong Son " Silver medal
- 14th International Olympiad in Informatics in Finland in 2001
  - Tran Quang Khai " Silver medal
- 15th International Olympiad in Informatics in South Korea in 2002
  - Tran Quang Khai " Gold medal
- 20th International Olympiad in Informatics in Croatia in 2007
  - Pham Nam Long - Bronze medal (Great Britain Selected Team)
- 23rd International Olympiad in Informatics in Thailand in 2011
  - Nguyen Hoang Yen " Bronze medal
- 24th International Olympiad in Informatics in Italy in 2012
  - Nguyen Viet Dung " Silver medal
- Asian Pacific Olympiad in Informatics in Singapore in 2013

- Pham Thai Son " Bronze medal

- 26th International Olympiad in Informatics in Taiwan in 2014

- Nguyen Quang Dung " Silver medal

- Asian Pacific Olympiad in Informatics in Indonesia in 2015

- Vu Phuc Hoang " Bronze medal

- 28th International Olympiad in Informatics in Russia in 2016

- Le Quang Tuan " Bronze medal

- Asian Pacific Olympiad in Informatics in South Korea in 2016

 - Le Quang Tuan " Silver medal

- 29th International Olympiad in Informatics in Iran in 2017

 - Le Quang Tuan " Gold medal

- 32nd International Olympiad in Informatics (Online) in 2020

 - Tran Quang Thanh " Bronze medal

- Asian Pacific Olympiad in Informatics (Online) in 2020

 - Tran Quang Thanh " Silver medal

- Asian Pacific Olympiad in Informatics in Egypt in 2022

 - Tran Khoi Nguyen " Silver medal

==== International Biology Olympiad ====
- 21st International Biology Olympiad in Korea in 2010
  - Vu Thi Ngoc Oanh " Bronze medal
- 22nd International Biology Olympiad in Taiwan in 2011
  - Nguyen Trung Kien " Bronze medal
- 23rd International Biology Olympiad in Singapore in 2012
  - Nguyen Thi Ngoc Hong " Bronze medal
- 24th International Biology Olympiad in Switzerland in 2013
  - Nguyen Thi Phuong Diep " Bronze medal

==== International Physics Olympiad and Asian Physics Olympiad ====
- 12th Asian Physics Olympiad in Israel in 2011

 - Pham Thanh Trung " Honorable mention

- 16th Asian Physics Olympiad in China in 2015

 - Nguyen Quang Nam " Silver medal

- 46th International Physics Olympiad in India in 2015

 - Nguyen Quang Nam " Silver medal

- 17th Asian Physics Olympiad in Hong Kong in 2016

 - Nguyen Quang Nam " Silver medal

- 47th International Physics Olympiad in Switzerland and Liechtenstein in 2016

 - Nguyen Quang Nam " Silver medal

- 19th Asian Physics Olympiad in Vietnam in 2018

 - Nguyen Van Duy " Silver medal

- 52nd International Physics Olympiad (Online) in 2020

 - Nguyen Khac Hai Long " Silver medal

== Notable alumni ==
=== Politics and Public Service ===
- Doan Xuan Hung - Former Deputy Minister of Ministry of Foreign Affairs of Vietnam and Ambassador to Japan and Germany.
- Nguyen Huy Dung - Chairman of Thai Nguyen Province, Former Deputy Minister, Ministry of Information and Communication
- Le Quoc Thinh - Vietnam Consulate General in Osaka, Japan.
- Nguyen Hoi Nghia - Former Deputy General Director of Ho Chi Minh City National University (Deputy Minister), member of the founding team of Gifted High School, National University of Ho Chi Minh City
- Nguyen Dinh Cong - Vice President of Vietnam Academy of Science and Technology (Deputy Minister), former deputy director of Institute of Mathematics of Vietnam.

=== Science ===
- Nguyen Lan Viet - Former President of Hanoi Medical University, President Vietnam Heart Association, Deputy Director Vietnam Heart Institute.
- Ho Tu Bao - Director of Knowledge Creation Methodology Laboratory, Japan Advanced Institute of Science and Technology (JAIST), Member of Science Council Institute of Advanced Mathematics in Vietnam
- Dinh Tien Cuong - Provost's Chair of Mathematics, National University of Singapore, Former Professor Sorbonne University, Member of Science Council Vietnam Advanced Mathematical Institute
- Do Duc Thai - Chair of Mathematics Department, Hanoi National University of Education, Member of Science Council Institute of Advanced Mathematics.
- Vũ Kim Tuấn - Distinguished Chair of the University of West Georgia, US.
- Nguyen Tu Cuong - Professor, Doctor of Mathematics Science, Institute of Mathematics of Vietnam.
- Nguyen Dong Yen - Professor, Doctor of Science in mathematics, Ta Quang Buu Prize 2015.
- Pham Duc Chinh - Professor, Doctor of Mechanical Science, Ta Quang Buu Award 2019.
- Ha Anh Vu - Honeywell International Center, United States.
- Nguyen Hong Thai - Professor at the Mathematics Institute of the University of Szczecin, Poland.

=== Business ===
- Le Dinh Long - Development Director of Spark Social Enterprise Center, Former General Director International Bank of Vietnam (VIB), Former General Director Hong Leong Bank Vietnam.
- Nguyen Tu Quang - Founder and CEO of Technology Group Bkav.
- Do Van Minh - CEO of Gemandept Joint Stock Company ( HOSE: GMD)
- Dao Trong Khoa - Vice President of Vietnam Logistics Association
- Ha Thanh Tu - Local Partner McKinsey & Company

=== Other ===
- Doan Minh Cuong (Course 1) - Former Head of the Division (equivalent to Rector) of the High School, Hanoi Pedagogical University.
