= Đàm Thanh Sơn =

Vietnamese theoretical physicist

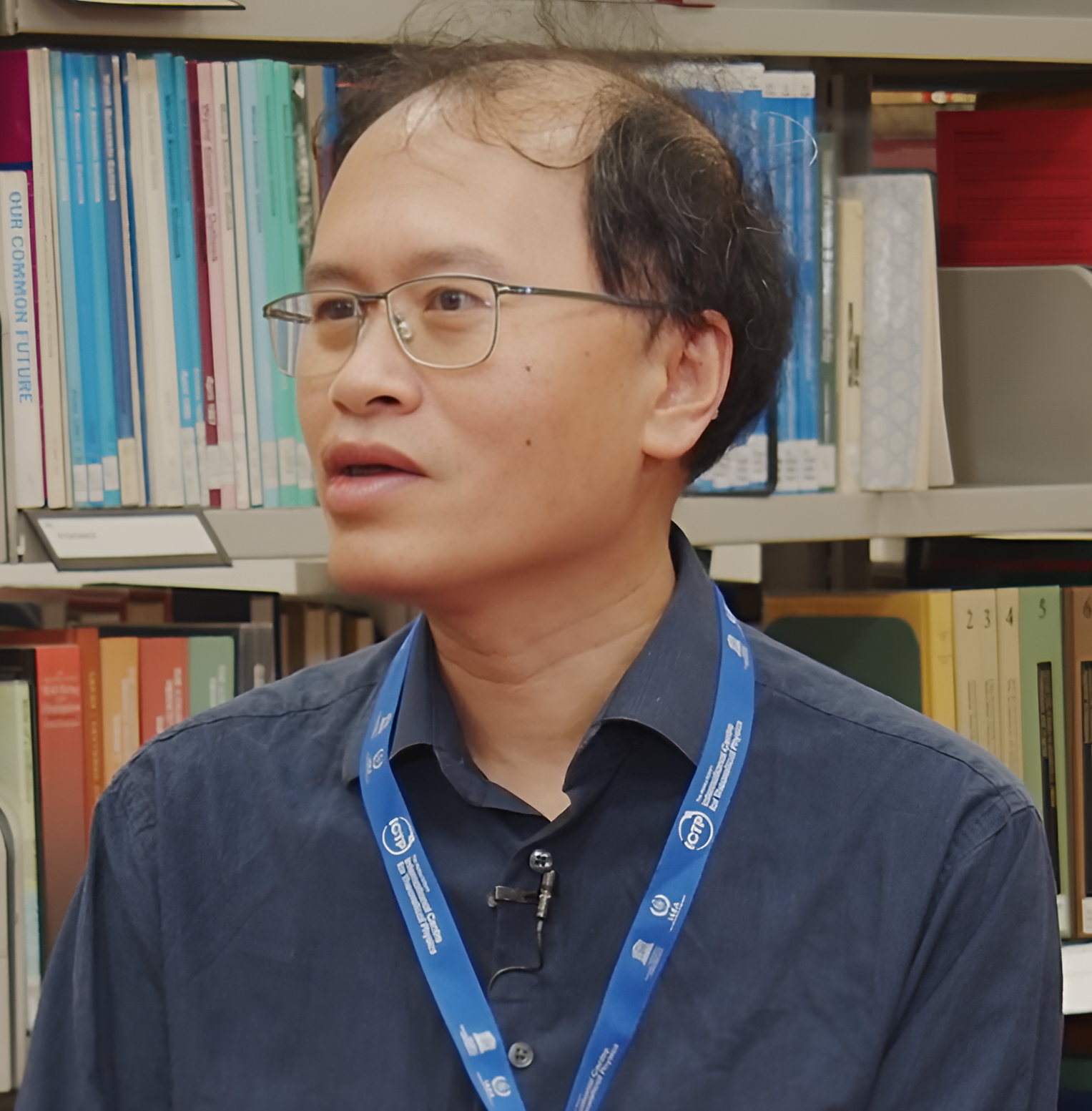
- Đàm Thanh Sơn in 2024
- Born: 1969 (age 56–57); Bac Ninh, North Vietnam
- Education: Institute for Nuclear Research; High School for Gifted Students, Hanoi University of Science
- Scientific career
- Fields: Nuclear physics Theoretical physics
- Workplaces: University of Washington; University of Chicago; MIT; Columbia University
- Doctoral advisor: Valery Rubakov
- Website: https://home.uchicago.edu/~dtson/

Đàm Thanh Sơn (born 1969) is a Vietnamese theoretical physicist working in quantum chromodynamics, applications of string theory and many-body physics.

== Early life and education ==
Born in North Vietnam, Bac Ninh. Sơn attended HUS High School for Gifted Students, where he won gold medal in the International Mathematics Olympiad with an absolute score, and received his Ph.D. at the Institute for Nuclear Research in Moscow in 1995.

== Career ==
Sơn was a postdoc at the University of Washington from 1995 to 1997, and the MIT Center for Theoretical Physics from 1997 to 1999. From 1999 to 2002 he was a professor at Columbia University and a RIKEN-BNL fellow. He moved to Seattle in 2002 when he became a senior fellow at the Institute for Nuclear Theory and a professor in the Physics Department, University of Washington. In 2012, he moved to Chicago to serve as a university professor at the University of Chicago.

== Honors ==
- Outstanding Junior Investigator in Nuclear Physics, DOE, 2000
- Alfred P. Sloan Foundation Fellow, 2001
- American Physical Society Fellow, 2006
- Simons Investigator Award, 2013
- Elected to American Academy of Arts and Sciences, 2014
- Elected to National Academy of Sciences, 2014
- Dirac Medal of the ICTP, 2018
- Bogolyubov Prize, 2019
