= Đàm Bích Thủy =

1st President of Fulbright University Vietnam
- In office 2015–2023
- Succeeded by: Scott Fritzen

Personal details
- Education: Vietnam National University, Hanoi (BA); University of Pennsylvania (MBA)

Đàm Bích Thủy is a Vietnamese businesswoman and university administrator. She served as the founding President of Fulbright University Vietnam from 2015 to 2023. Đàm previously served as head of group development for Southeast Asia at National Australia Bank.
