= Hoàng Tụy =

Vietnamese mathematician (1927–2019)

- Born: 7 December 1927; Xuân Đài village, Điện Bàn
- Died: 14 July 2019 (aged 91); Hanoi
- Occupation: Mathematician
- Known for: the Tụy cut in global optimization

Academic background
- Education: Moscow State University
- Doctoral advisor: Dmitrii Menshov; Georgiy Shilov

Academic work
- Institutions: Hanoi Institute of Mathematics

Hoàng Tụy (Note: In this Vietnamese name, the surname is Hoàng, but is often simplified to Hoang in English-language text. In accordance with Vietnamese custom, this person should be referred to by the given name, Tụy.) (7 December 1927 – 14 July 2019) was a prominent Vietnamese applied mathematician. He was considered one of two founders of the mathematical institutions of Vietnam; the other was Lê Văn Thiêm.

== Career ==
Tụy's early career coincided with the French war (1946–1954), which interrupted his studies. In December 1946, after two months as a mathematics student at Hanoi University of Science VNU, he had to return to the south, because the French had invaded and seized Hanoi, and the University had closed. Tụy taught secondary school in Quảng Ngãi province in the Fifth Liberated Zone from 1947 to 1951, during which time he wrote a geometry textbook that was published by the Việt Minh press—perhaps the first time a guerrilla movement published a math book. In the early 1950s, Tụy studied with Lê Văn Thiêm at the university that the Việt Minh had opened in a liberated zone in the far north near the Chinese border. In September 1957 he went to the Soviet Union, where he studied real analysis under the supervision of D. E. Menshov and G. E. Shilov. Tụy received his PhD in mathematics from Moscow State University in 1959.

After returning to Vietnam from the Soviet Union, Tụy changed his area of research from real analysis, which was too theoretical to be of immediate use in Vietnam, to operations research, a field of applied mathematics. It was Tụy who first brought that field of research to Vietnam, and who invented the Vietnamese translation vận trù of "operations research." From then onwards, Tụy worked mainly in the field of global optimization, where he did pioneering work. He had a long career with the Institute of Mathematics of the Vietnamese Academy of Science and Technology, where he was director from 1980 to 1989. He published more than 160 refereed journal and conference articles.

In 1997, a workshop in honor of Tụy was organized at Linköping University, Sweden.

In December 2007, an international conference on Nonconvex Programming was held in Rouen, France, to pay tribute to him on the occasion of his 80th birthday, in recognition of his pioneering achievements that advanced the field of global optimization.

In September 2011, Professor Tụy was named as the first-ever recipient of the Constantin Carathéodory Prize of the International Society of Global Optimization for his pioneering work and fundamental contributions to global optimization.

=== Papers ===
Publications in Math-Net.Ru

- Conical algorithms for solving a concave programming problem and some generalizations S. L. Utkin, V. R. Khachaturov, Hoàng Tụy Zh. Vychisl. Mat. Mat. Fiz., 28:7 (1988), 992–999
- Solving the linear complementarity problem through concave programming Nguyen Van Thoai, Hoang Tuy Zh. Vychisl. Mat. Mat. Fiz., 23:3 (1983), 602–608
- Almost affine functions Hoàng Tụy Mat. Zametki, 9:4 (1971), 435–440
- The structure of measurable functions. II Hoàng Tụy Mat. Sb. (N.S.), 54(96):2 (1961), 177–208
- On the structure of measurable functions. I Hoàng Tụy Mat. Sb. (N.S.), 53(95):4 (1961), 429–488
- The “universal primitive” of J. Markusiewicz Hoàng Tụy Izv. Akad. Nauk SSSR Ser. Mat., 24:4 (1960), 617–628

== Family ==
An ancestor of Hoàng Tụy was a famous leader of anti-colonial resistance:

One of my ancestors, Hoàng Diệu, was governor of Hanoi in the 1880s. He heroically defended Hanoi against the French, but the city fell. Believing himself to be responsible, he took his own life rather than allow himself to be captured by the enemy. His resistance and suicide are considered to have been acts of great patriotism. In 1945, when the revolution took Hanoi back from the French, for a time Hanoi was renamed Hoàng Diệu City.

Tụy's son, Hoang Duong Tuan, is now a full professor at the University of Technology, Sydney, Australia, where he is working on the applications of optimization in various engineering fields. His son-in-law, Phan Thien Thach, works also on optimization.
