= Phạm Huy Thông =

Vietnamese educator, poet and social scientist (1916–1988)

Phạm Huy Thông (1916–1988) was a Vietnamese scholar, educator, archaeologist, poet and social scientist. A Bachelor of Law graduate of the University of Indochina, in 1937 he went to study in Paris, France. In 1949 he joined the French Communist Party, and in 1953 joined the Labour Party. In 1952 he was expelled from France and was put on probation in Haiphong. He later escaped from prison and became Rector of Hanoi University of Education (1956–1966), Director of the Institute of Archaeology (1967–1988), professor and Vice-Chairman of the Social Sciences Committee, and was a member of National Assemblies II and III. In 1987, he was elected a foreign academic of the Academy of Sciences of the German Democratic Republic.
