= Fulbright Economics Teaching Program =

The Fulbright Economics Teaching Program (FETP) is a partnership of the University of Economics, Ho Chi Minh City and the Harvard Kennedy School. The school is based in Vietnam and its website is both in Vietnamese and English. It has an Open Source Education portal available to everyone in the world similar to and influenced by MIT OpenCourseWare.

The FETP OpenCourseWare offers free economics education. Their motto is the following: "Inspired by the Massachusetts Institute of Technology’s OpenCourseWare Initiative (OCW), the Fulbright School has begun to publish its teaching and research materials online. FETP OpenCourseWare is not a long-distance learning project, rather it is a resource for people working or studying in policy-related fields to increase their knowledge and explore new approaches to learning and curriculum development."
