= VNU University of Science =

University in Hanoi, Vietnam

Coordinates: 20.9959°N 105.8082°E

- Vietnamese: Trường Đại học Khoa học Tự nhiên, Đại học Quốc gia Hà Nội
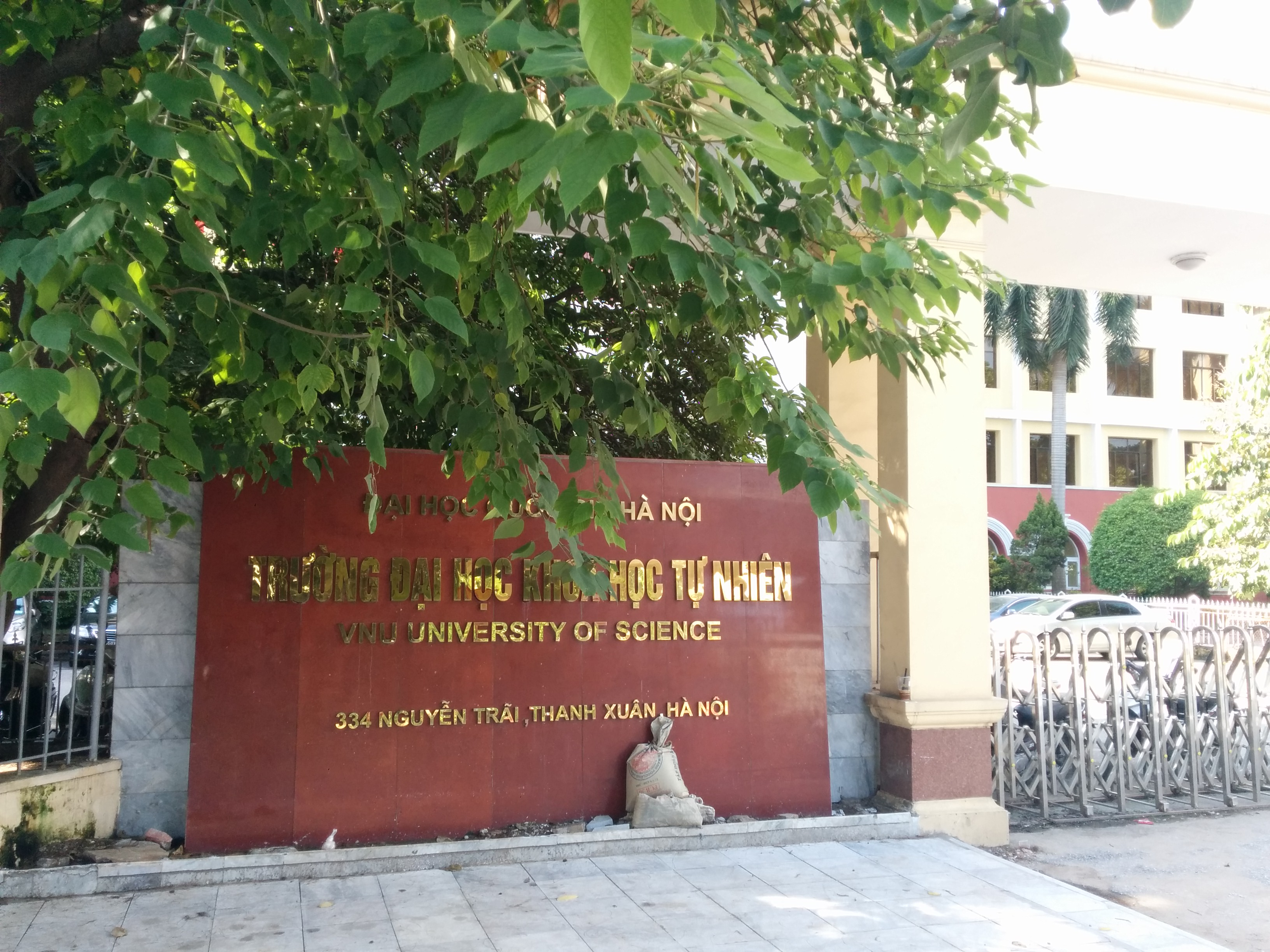
- Main entrance to the university’s headquarter on Nguyễn Trãi street, Thanh Xuân
- Former name: 1956 - 1995 - General University of Hanoi (Vietnamese: Trường Đại học Tổng hợp Hà Nội)
- Type: Public university
- Established: 1956
- Parent institution: Vietnam National University, Hanoi
- President: Prof Vũ Hoàng Linh
- Principal: Dr Lê Thanh Sơn
- Undergraduates: 8494
- Postgraduates: 604
- Location: Hanoi, Vietnam
- Campus: Urban
- Website: english.hus.vnu.edu.vn

VNU University of Science (VNU-HUS; Vietnamese: Trường Đại học Khoa học Tự nhiên, Đại học Quốc gia Hà Nội) or Hanoi University of Science, is a member of Vietnam National University, Hanoi. Founded in 1906 as Indochina University, the university has changed its name three times: School of Basic Science (1951), University of Hanoi (1956), VNU University of Science (1993). Since the last name change, VNU University of Science is a member of Vietnam National University, Hanoi.

== History ==
Hanoi University was established on June 4, 1956 by prime minisiter Pham Van Dong. Initially, it had specialized faculties focused on math, physics, chemistry, literature, and history.

In 1993, Hanoi National University was established by prime minister Võ Văn Kiệt to merge three universities: General University of Hanoi, Hanoi University of Pedagogy, University of Foreign Language Education.

In September 1995, humanities faculties split away from the General University of Hanoi, becoming what is now the University of Social Sciences and Humanities. The remaining institution, made up of natural sciences faculties, renamed itself to the University of Science in the same year.

In 1999, faculty in a number of technological departments were separated from University of Science and Technology to reorganize into Faculty of Technology Online VNU. The Research Center for Applied Microbiology and Research Center for Edible Mushrooms was moved into a Biotechnology Center under VNU.

== Campuses and facilities ==
The school has three campuses in Hanoi, with the main campus located at 334 Nguyen Trai, Thanh Xuân. The other two campuses are located at 19 Le Thanh Tong, Hoan Kiem and 182 Luong The Vinh, Thanh Xuan. The 19 Le Thanh Tong campus was the former site of University of Indochina, established in 1906, a valuable architectural heritage site designed by famous French architect Ernest Hébrard, built during the French Indochina period in neoclassical French architectural style.

The university has 100 laboratories (laboratories) and computer labs for teaching, learning and scientific research. In which, there are 85 laboratories, one national key laboratory, five key laboratories at VNU and four groups: Basic Practice Laboratory, Thematic Laboratory, Target Laboratory and Key Laboratory.

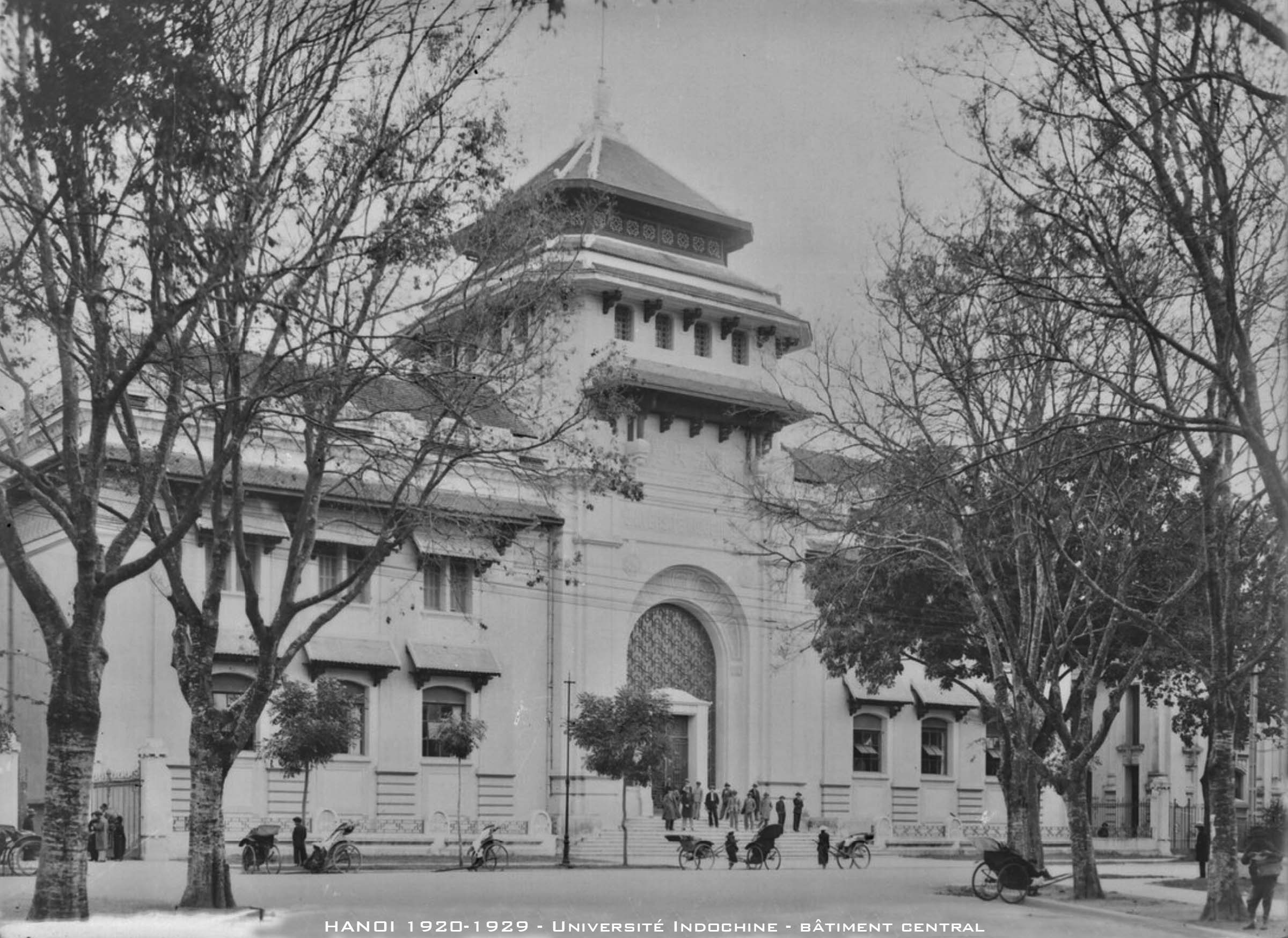
University of Indochina, 19 Le Thanh Tong street, c.1929. This site is now one of the three campuses of VNU-HUS.

== Organisation and administration ==
=== Faculties and research centres ===
The faculties are:

- Faculty of Mathematics, Mechanics, and Informatics
- Faculty of Physics
- Faculty of Chemistry
- Faculty of Biology
- Faculty of Geography
- Faculty of Geology
- Faculty of Environmental studies
- Faculty of Meteorology and Oceanography

Across all faculties, the university offers 41 undergraduate programmes, 29 Master’s programmes, and 40 doctoral programmes.

Affiliated research centres are:

- Centre for Environmental Technology and Sustainable Development (CTASD, Vietnamese: Trung tâm Nghiên cứu Công nghệ Môi trường và Phát triển bền vững)
- Research Centre for Environmental Monitoring and Modelling (CEMM, Vietnamese: Trung tâm Nghiên cứu Quan trắc và Mô hình hóa Môi trường)
- Centre for Environmental Fluid Dynamics (CEFD, Vietnamese: Trung tâm Động lực học Thủy Khí Môi trường)
- Nanotechnology and Energy Centre (NEC, Vietnamese: Trung tâm Nano và Năng lượng)
