= Fulbright University Vietnam =

Private nonprofit university in Hồ Chí Minh City, Vietnam

- Đại học Fulbright Việt Nam
- Other name: FUV
- Type: Private university
- Established: 2016
- Founder: Thomas Vallely
- Accreditation: NECHE (candidacy); NASPAA
- President: Đinh Vũ Trang Ngân
- Students: 832 (2024)
- Undergraduates: 716 (2024)
- Postgraduates: 116 (2024)
- Location: Ho Chi Minh City, Vietnam
- Campus: Urban, Phú Mỹ Hưng Campus (District 7); planned SHTP Campus (Thủ Đức)
- Language: English
- Colors: Blue & gold
- Website: fulbright.edu.vn

Fulbright University Vietnam (FUV; Vietnamese: Đại học Fulbright Việt Nam) is a private, nonprofit liberal arts university in Ho Chi Minh City, Vietnam. It is one of Vietnam's first private, nonprofit institutions of higher education, offering undergraduate and graduate programs rooted in the American liberal arts tradition. Since 2014, the university's development has been coordinated by the Trust for University Innovation in Vietnam (TUIV), a nonprofit corporation based in Boston, Massachusetts. The FUV and TUIV are recipients of several grants from the Bureau of Educational and Cultural Affairs of the United States Department of State.

== History ==
The concept of an American-style liberal arts college in Vietnam emerged from discussions convened by the Vietnam Program at the Harvard Kennedy School, aimed at planning the next stage in the development of the Fulbright Economics Teaching Program (FETP), a center of public policy research and teaching in Ho Chi Minh City that had operated since 1994.

The campaign for licensing and funding was spearheaded by Thomas Vallely of the Ash Center for Democratic Governance and Innovation at the Harvard Kennedy School. In 2013, FUV was cited in a joint statement by President Trương Tấn Sang and President Barack Obama during President Sang's visit to the United States. In June 2014, Prime Minister Nguyễn Tấn Dũng approved the establishment of FUV, and in December 2014, the United States Congress appropriated $20 million to fund the university's development, on the condition that it remain independent, not-for-profit, and on par with the quality of American universities.

A license to establish FUV was presented to the Board of the TUIV by Nguyễn Phú Trọng in 2015. The government of Vietnam officially licensed FUV on May 16, 2016. Later that month, U.S. President Barack Obama announced the inauguration of Fulbright University Vietnam in a speech in Hanoi. Two days later in Ho Chi Minh City, at a ceremony witnessed by Secretary of State John Kerry, FUV was formally awarded its establishment license.

While in the Senate, Kerry and fellow Vietnam veteran John McCain had been strong advocates of education exchange with Vietnam, and as Secretary of State, Kerry was an early champion of the FUV initiative.

== Campus ==
=== Phú Mỹ Hưng campus ===
FUV's current campus is located at the Ground Floor and 2nd Floor of Crescent Plaza in Phú Mỹ Hưng, Tân Mỹ (District 7), Ho Chi Minh City. The ground floor houses the Fulbright School of Public Policy and Management, while the upper floor serves as the temporary headquarters and main campus pending completion of the permanent site. The campus was relocated from its previous address on Võ Thị Sáu Street in District 3, the former home of the FETP, which has since become Campus V of the University of Economics Ho Chi Minh City.

=== SHTP campus ===
FUV plans to build its permanent main campus in the Saigon Hi-Tech Park (SHTP) in Tăng Nhơn Phú (Thủ Đức), Ho Chi Minh City. The government of Ho Chi Minh City contributed 15 hectares of land within the park to FUV following the issuance of its investment registration certificate in 2015, where the university will construct learning and residential facilities. In 2024, FUV announced it had received a construction permit for Phase 1 at the SHTP, covering 13 approved projects. Construction is scheduled to begin in 2025 and be completed in the fourth quarter of 2026.

== Governance and administration ==
Fulbright University Vietnam is governed by a Board of Trustees and overseen by the TUIV. Vallely stated that the university would "embody American values including academic freedom, autonomy, meritocracy, and transparency."

Đinh Vũ Trang Ngân has been the university's President since July 2025. The current chair of its Board of Trustees is Henry Nguyen, appointed in November 2026.

== Academics ==
FUV offers undergraduate and graduate programs grounded in the liberal arts and sciences. During its first five years, the university focused on developing two integrated academic units: a graduate school of public policy and management, and an undergraduate program in engineering and the liberal arts and sciences.

The Fulbright School of Public Policy and Management (FSPPM) represents the continuation and expansion of the FETP program, which was operated by the Harvard Kennedy School's Vietnam Program from 1994 to 2016. The school offers postgraduate degree and non-degree programs in public policy and related fields.

FUV's undergraduate program admitted a beta class in 2018 and underwent a year-long co-design process to build all aspects of the university collaboratively with the involvement of faculty, staff, and students. The academic program was developed in consultation with faculty members from the Olin College of Engineering, and features interdisciplinary courses, project-based learning, and active community engagement. The university is currently a candidate in the accreditation process of the New England Commission of Higher Education.

== Controversies ==
=== Bob Kerrey ===
In May 2016, then-Secretary of State John Kerry announced that Bob Kerrey, a former U.S. senator and Nebraska governor, had been appointed as chairman of FUV's Board of Trustees. The appointment prompted widespread controversy. A 2001 investigation by The New York Times and CBS News had revealed that in 1969, Kerrey commanded a Navy SEALs unit responsible for the massacre of 21 civilians in Thạnh Phong village during the Vietnam War.

Prominent Vietnamese critics of the appointment included Tôn Nữ Thị Ninh, a former ambassador to the European Union, and Nguyễn Thanh Việt, an award-winning Vietnamese-American author. The most senior Vietnamese official to publicly support the appointment was Đinh La Thăng, then Communist Party Secretary of Ho Chi Minh City and a member of the Politburo.

In May 2018, H. Kim Bottomly, former president of Wellesley College, was appointed as the new chair of the Board of Trustees. In June 2019, Bottomly stepped down amid a Board reorganization that restored oversight responsibility to TUIV, chaired by Thomas Vallely.

== See also ==
- Fulbright Economics Teaching Program
- Harvard Kennedy School
- University of Economics Ho Chi Minh City
- Education in Vietnam
- List of universities in Vietnam
