= Girls Like Me Don't Cry =

2022 song by Thuy

"Girls Like Me Don’t Cry"
- sped up version cover

Single by Thuy

from the EP Girls Like Me Don’t Cry
- Released: October 6, 2022
- Recorded: 2022
- Genre: Pop; R&B; Soul
- Length: 3:34
- Label: piano rs
- Songwriters: David Obata Teel, Alexandro Guerrero, Charles Charron, Thuy Thi Thu Tran
- Producer: DTB Hightone

Music video
- "Girls Like Me Don't Cry" on YouTube

"Girls Like Me Don’t Cry" is a song by Vietnamese American singer Thuy. It was released on October 6, 2022, as the lead single from her debut EP of the same name. The song, mainly its sped up version, released on December 16, 2022, went viral on TikTok throughout the summer of 2023.

== Background ==
She wrote the song during a hard time in her life stating "It's okay to cry. Crying is not a sign of weakness; crying is when you are in tune with yourself, and you let it out and then go back to go back to your life."

She adds, "When I wrote this song, I was trying to tough it out during a really hard time in my life, and all I wanted to do was let it out. Once I did, I felt like a huge weight off my shoulder, and it showed me that I can have and show emotion but still be strong at the same time."

Thuy said she "wanted to tell the story of recovery from a toxic relationship. This project also follows an actual journey unveiling a love story and how it progresses from lust to passion through trust, insecurities, etc. This project is also very personal to me. When I was younger, my uncle had a nickname for me in Vietnamese that essentially meant crybaby. I used to cry at the tiniest inconvenience and honestly still do (just on the inside). I think a lot of times people see me as someone who’s always strong and confident but the truth is, even the strongest women cry sometimes and that is never a sign of weakness."

== Composition ==
The song is a pop, R&B and soul song that was written by David Obata Teel, Alexandro Guerrero, Charles Charron and Thuy Thi Thu Tran and was produced by DTB and Hightone, and has a tempo of 110 BPM and runs 3 minutes and 34 seconds long with a C key and a minor mode.

== Reception ==
The song was critically acclaimed by critics, Femmusic.com applauded the melody saying "Brimming with timeless story-telling, warm vocals, and fluttering melodies, the project feels like an important new chapter for the young artist as she sees herself transform from hometown hero to global icon."

== Music video ==
The music video was released along with the single and was praised for "its pop-R&B bliss." Onestowatch.com called it "a moment of sonic nirvana, floating atop production that is as light as she throws out grin-inducing lines like 'Been through some shit / Wear my heart on my sleeve so it’s hard to miss.' It's a well-deserved victory strut that sees her building on everything that's come before to bask in one final moment of pop-R&B bliss before she galavants off into the unknown sunset."

== Charts ==
Chart performance for "Girls Like Me Don't Cry"
Chart (2022–2023)	Peak position
Vietnam Billboard Hot 100 (Billboard)	9
New Zealand (Recorded Music NZ)	39

== Min Remix ==
"Girls Like Me Don’t Cry (Remix)"

Single by Thuy featuring Min
- Language: English, Vietnamese
- Released: March 8, 2023
- Recorded: 2023
- Genre: Pop; R&B; Soul
- Length: 3:33
- Label: piano rs
- Songwriters: David Obata Teel, Alexandro Guerrero, Charles Charron, Thuy Thi Thu Tran, Nguyễn Hoàng Tôn
- Producer: DTB Hightone

Music video
- "Girls Like Me Don't Cry" (Remix) ft. MIN on YouTube

A remix version featuring Min was released on March 8, 2023.
