= Thủy =

American singer (born 1991)

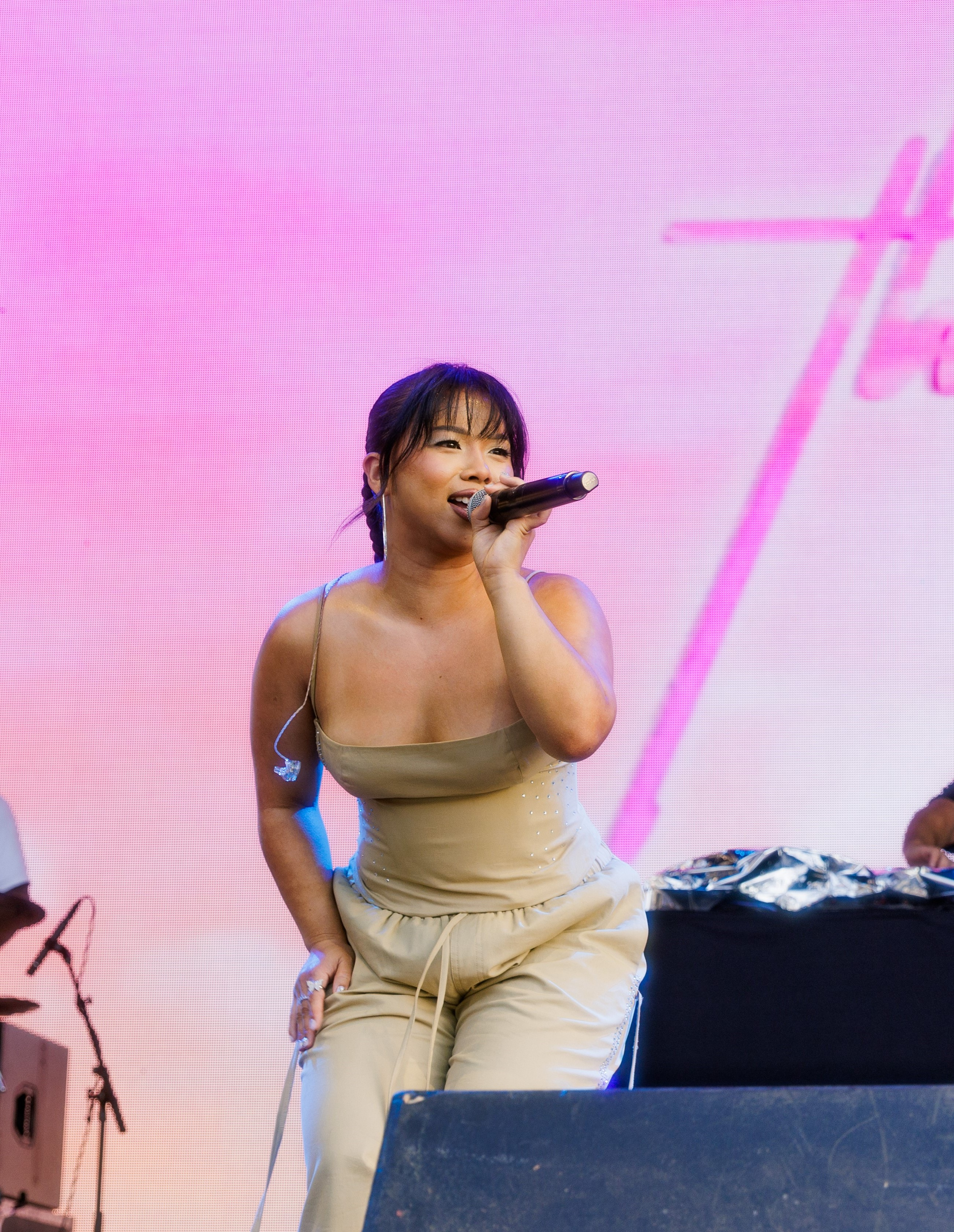
- Thuy at Head in The Clouds 2022

Background information
- Born: Trần Thị Thu Thủy; October 29, 1991 (age 34); Stockton, California, U.S.
- Genres: R&B; hip hop; pop
- Occupations: Singer; songwriter
- Years active: 2015-present
- Website: thuymusic.com

Thuy Thi Thu Tran Vietnamese: [tʰwi˧˩] (born October 29, 1991) known mononymously as Thuy or Thủy (stylized in lowercase) is an American singer and songwriter based in Los Angeles, California. Thuy is an independent artist and has released 2 EPs. Her single "Girls Like Me Don't Cry" went viral on the video-sharing platform TikTok in the middle of 2023.

== Early life ==
Trần Thị Thu Thủy was born in Stockton, California to Vietnamese refugee parents, and was raised in Newark in the East Bay region of Northern California. Karaoke was a primary source of entertainment in her family. She attended Newark Memorial High School, where she was a member of the choir, and then went on to attend the University of California, Santa Barbara, where she majored in biopsychology.

== Career ==
=== 2015–2020: Career beginnings ===
After graduating college, Thuy planned to pursue a career as a physician assistant and held a number of jobs in the medical field but frequently changed jobs due to her lack of interest in her chosen career, working variously at several dental clinics, dermatology offices, and as an optometric technician, while writing and recording songs at night. During this time, Thuy released various cover videos on social media.

In 2015, Thuy released her song "Hands on Me". The song gained widespread support in the Bay Area community after winning KMEL 106.1's Home Turf contest. Following the song's success, Thuy moved to Los Angeles with her boyfriend and childhood friend to pursue music-making full-time.

In 2017, she released "All Night Long", which initially gained a small amount of traction. In 2020, the song gained a resurgence in popularity after a slowed-down version of the song went viral on TikTok.

=== 2021: I Hope U See This ===
In 2021, Thuy released four singles leading up to a nine-track debut EP, I Hope U See This (stylized in lowercase). The full project was released on October 29, 2021, on her birthday. I Hope U See This was released with an accompanying music video, which Thuy co-directed herself. The music video portrays a younger version of Thuy, who is played by her real life cousin.

=== 2022–present: Girls Like Me Don't Cry ===
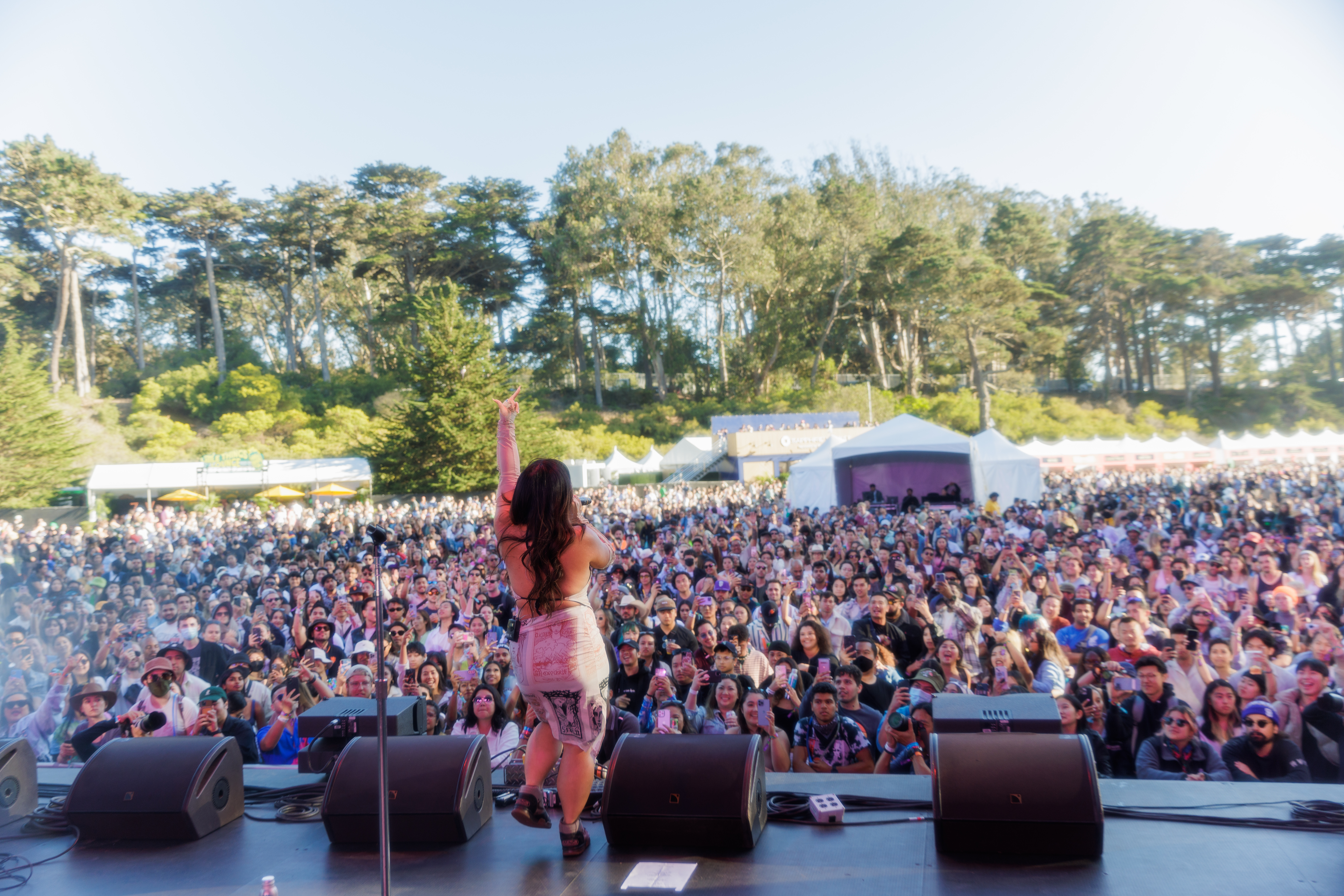
Thuy performing at Outside Lands in San Francisco, California.

After the release of I Hope U See This, Thuy released a deluxe version of the EP. In May 2022, she embarked on her first tour with four sold out dates.

In August 2022, she performed at Outside Lands Music Festival in San Francisco and Head in the Clouds in Pasadena, California.

In the fall of 2022, Thuy released her second EP, Girls Like Me Don't Cry. The EP was supported with a sold out North American west coast tour.

In January 2023, it was announced that Thuy would perform at the 2023 Sol Blume Festival. It was also announced that she was named as one of Vevo's DSCVR Artists to Watch 2023.

From March through August 2023, Thuy served as the opening act on Ella Mai's Heart On My Sleeve Tour. In March 2023, she made her debut in the Vietnamese music market by releasing a remix of "Girls Like Me Don't Cry" (the EP's title track) featuring Min. In addition, "Girls Like Me Don't Cry" entered the Billboard Vietnam Hot 100 and peaked at number 9.

In April 2024, Thuy debuted at Coachella as the first Vietnamese-American female artist to ever play at the festival. On October 21, 2024, she announced her 2025 Wings World Tour on Instagram after the release of her album Wings.

== Artistry ==
Thuy grew up listening to R&B and pop from the early 1990s and 2000s and cites her early musical inspirations as Britney Spears, Mariah Carey, Brandy, Tamia, Christina Aguilera. She has been described by Paper as having a "signature, nostalgic sound — catchy R&B melodies, agile runs and dreamlike soundscapes". Thuy has expressed admiration for contemporaries such as Kehlani and Keshi.

== Personal life ==
Thuy currently lives in Los Angeles. She has a boyfriend named Charlie who is also a musician, with whom she co-writes songs. She has a dog named Oliver.

== Discography ==
=== Studio albums ===
Title	Details
Wings	Released: October 4, 2024; Label: Thuy; Formats: Streaming, digital download; Track listing: 1. "Fairy Godmother"; 2. "Roleplay"; 3. "Whatcha Gotta Say (with Blxst)"; 4. "D8"; 5. "Crash & Burn"; 6. "Shy Boy"; 7. "Hair Down"; 8. "Cloud 11"; 9. "Wings"

=== Extended plays ===
Title	Details
I Hope U See This	Released: October 29, 2021; Released Deluxe Version: May 24, 2022; Label: Thuy; Formats: Streaming, digital download; Track listing: 1. "Trippin'"; 2. "Chances"; 3. "In My Head"; 4. "Figured U Out"; 5. "In My Bag"; 6. "Ride for Me"; 7. "Universe"; 8. "U Got Me"; 9. "I Hope U See This"; Deluxe edition: 1. "Distance Between Us"; 2. "X's and S's (feat. DCMBR)"; 3. "Inhibitions (feat. P-Lo)"; 4. "Universe (Remix) (feat. Christian Kuria)"; 5. "In My Bag (Remix) (feat. Destiny Rogers)"; 6. "Universe (DTB Remix)"
Spotify Singles	Released: May 18, 2022; Label: Thuy; Formats: Streaming, digital download; Track listing: 1. "Universe (DTB Remix)"; 2. "So Into You"
Girls Like Me Don't Cry	Released: October 6, 2022; Released Deluxe Version: May 24, 2023; Label: Thuy; Formats: Streaming, digital download; Track listing: 1. "U Should Feel Special"; 2. "Obsessed"; 3. "Dumb Luck"; 4. "Trust (feat. RINI)"; 5. "Playing Tricks"; 6. "Insecurities"; 7. "Girls Like Me Don't Cry"; Deluxe Edition: 1. "I Got It"; 2. "Fresh White Tee"; 3. "Butterflies (feat. Rexx Life Raj)"; 4. "Girls Like Me Don't Cry (Remix) feat. MIN"
Live at VEVO	Live Album; Released: August 18, 2023; Label: Thuy; Formats: Streaming, digital download; Track listing: 1. "Dumb Luck (Live at VEVO)"; 2. "Playing Tricks (Live at VEVO)"; 3. "U Should Feel Special (Live at VEVO)"
Don't Miss Me Too Much	Released: October 30, 2023; Label: Thuy; Formats: Streaming, digital download; Track listing: 1. "Attention"; 2. "No Ties"; 3. "Don't Miss Me Too Much"

=== Singles ===
==== As a lead artist ====
Title	Year	Peak chart positions		Album
Title	Year	VIE	NZ	Album
"Hands on Me"	2015	—	—	Non-album singles
"Ain't No One"	2015	—	—	Non-album singles
"Slide"	2016	—	—	Non-album singles
"Addicted"	2016	—	—	Non-album singles
"All Night Long"	2017	—	—	Non-album singles
"Waiting on You"	2017	—	—	Non-album singles
"Next To You"	2017	—	—	Non-album singles
"Holiday SZN"	2017	—	—	Non-album singles
"Never Yours"	2018	—	—	Non-album singles
"Options"	2018	—	—	Non-album singles
"Bad"	2018	—	—	Non-album singles
"Mood Ring"	2018	—	—	Non-album singles
"The Way"	2018	—	—	Non-album singles
"Real"	2018	—	—	Non-album singles
"Wish List"	2018	—	—	Non-album singles
"Wanted"	2019	—	—	Non-album singles
"Day Dream"	2019	—	—	Non-album singles
"Tied Down"	2019	—	—	Non-album singles
"Vapor Rub"	2020	—	—	Non-album singles
"111"	2021	—	—	Non-album singles
"Chances"	2021	—	—	I Hope U See This
"Universe" (Note: "Universe (Sped Up)" was released on April 6, 2023.)	2021	—	—	I Hope U See This
"In My Bag"	2021	—	—	I Hope U See This
"In My Head"	2021	—	—	I Hope U See This
"Trippin' "	2021	—	—	I Hope U See This
"I Hope U See This"	2021	—	—	I Hope U See This
"Snowing in LA"	2021	—	—	Non-album single
"Inhibitions" (feat. P-Lo)	2022	—	—	I Hope U See This (deluxe)
"Trust" (Feat. RINI)	2022	—	—	Girls Like Me Don't Cry
"Playing Tricks"	2022	—	—	Girls Like Me Don't Cry
"U Should Feel Special"	2022	—	—	Girls Like Me Don't Cry
"Girls Like Me Don't Cry" (Note: "Girls Like Me Don't Cry (Sped Up)" was released on December 16, 2022, "Girls Like Me Don't Cry (Slowed + Reverbed)" EP was released on February 13, 2023, "Girls Like Me Don't Cry (Remix) (feat. Min)" was released on March 08, 2023 and "Girls Like Me Don't Cry (Stripped)" was released on September 22, 2023.)	2022	9	39	Girls Like Me Don't Cry
"Attention"	2023	—	—	Don't Miss Me Too Much
"Don't Miss Me Too Much" (Note: "Don't Miss Me Too Much (Remixes)" EP was released on March 1, 2024.)	2023	—	—	Don't Miss Me Too Much
"Hair Down" (Note: "Hair Down (Sped Pp)" was released on May 24, 2024, "Hair Down (Remix)" EP was released on July 19, 2024, featuring Chungha.)	2024	—	—	Wings
"Cloud 11"	2024	—	—	Wings
"Fairy Godmother"	2024	—	—	Wings
"Wings"	2024	—	—	Wings
"—" denotes a recording that did not chart or was not released in that region.

==== As a collaboration artist ====
Title	Year	Album
"Close With Desires" (with Teo Glacier)	2023	Doin’ Just Fine
"Summers Around The Corner (Explicit Ver.)" (with Rexx Life Raj)	2023	California Poppy 3
"Two Truths And A Lie" (with ASTN)	2024	What a Night to Be in Love

==== As a featured artist ====
Title	Year	Album
"Reasons" (Young Gully ft. Thuy [Prod. Traxamillion])	2016	Non-album singles
"Feenin' " (CR Crucial ft. Russ Coson, Thuy [Prod. BFmeez])	2017	Non-album singles
"On Your Line" (CR CruciaL Feat. Russ Coson & Thuy [Prod. By Jasdeep])	2018	Non-album singles
"Goin' Down" (King$ featuring Thuy [Prod. By Jasdeep])	2018	Non-album singles
"Bet" (The Lunch Table ft. Thuy [Prod. De'la])	2019	Non-album singles
"Can't Walk Away" (Russ Cosón Feat. Thuy)	2020	Non-album singles
"Without You" (Russ Cosón featuring Thuy)	2020	Pisces.
"Over" (Austin Sexton featuring Thuy)	2021	Non-album single
"Love Songs" (Joe Trufant featuring Thuy)	2022	Cross My Heart
"Twin Flames" (Denise Julia featuring Thuy)	2024	Sweet Nothings (Chapter 2)
"Players Holiday '25" (P-Lo feat. Larry June, Kamaiyah, Saweetie, LaRussell, G-Eazy, Thuy, & YMTK)	2024	Non-album single

=== Soundtracks ===
Title	Year	Album
"Sweetest Nothings"	2024	Jentry Chau vs. the Underworld OST

=== Other songs ===
Title	Year	Album
"Love Come Down" (Young Gully featuring Thuy)	2016	I Don't Wanna Rap No More
"Into" (Knucles featuring Thuy)	2019	SMD
"Criminal (Over You)" (Afgan, thủy)	2024	Sonder

== Concert tours ==
Headline Tours

- I Hope U See This Tour (2021)
- Girls Like Me Don't Cry Tour (2022-2023)
- Wings World Tour (2024-2025)

Opening Tours

- Heart On My Sleeve Tour (Ella Mai) (2023)
- The Locket Tour (Madison Beer) (2026)
