= Ghen Cô Vy =

2020 Vietnamese song about the COVID-19 pandemic

Promotional single by NIOEH, Khắc Hưng, Min and Erik
- Language: Vietnamese
- English title: "Jealous [of] Coronavirus"
- Released: February 23, 2020
- Genre: EDM, trap, tropical house
- Length: 3:09
- Songwriter: Khắc Hưng
- Producer: Khắc Hưng

Min singles chronology
"Vì yêu cứ đâm đầu" (2019)	"Ghen Cô Vy" (2020)	"Trên tình bạn dưới tình yêu" (2020)

Erik singles chronology
"Có tất cả nhưng thiếu anh" (2019)	"Ghen Cô Vy" (2020)	"Em không sai, chúng ta sai" (2020)

Music video
- Ghen Cô Vy on YouTube

"Ghen Cô Vy" (Vietnamese pronunciation: [ɣɛn ko vi]; transl. Jealous of Coronavirus) is a song by Vietnamese singers Min and Erik, released on February 23, 2020. Written and composed by Khắc Hưng, the song supported a health communication campaign initiated by the Vietnamese National Institute of Occupational and Environmental Health (NIOEH), part of the Vietnamese Ministry of Health, in response to the COVID-19 pandemic in Vietnam. The campaign, which also included an animated music video and a dance challenge choreographed by Quang Dang on YouTube, was created and managed by Hoang Diem Huyen from NIOEH.

== Background and composition ==
"Ghen Cô Vy" is based on a V-pop song, "Ghen" (English: "Jealous"), originally released by Min and Erik on May 23, 2017. The updated song was produced and released in response to the COVID-19 pandemic in Vietnam as a means to promote hygiene habits against COVID-19, including washing hands, not touching one's face and keeping their surroundings clean. The title is a play on the Vietnamese pronunciation of "nCoV" (Vietnamese pronunciation: [ɛn ko vi]), the initial name used for COVID-19.

Khắc Hưng was contacted by Hoàng Diễm Huyền from the NIOEH in early 2020 to compose a song as a means to propagate methods to prevent the virus. However, due to time constraints, the two chose a previously-existing song, "Ghen", and subsequently rewrote the lyrics.

== Music video ==
An accompanying animated music video was produced by Yang Animation Artist and Hoàng Diễm Huyền. It features animated versions of both Min and Erik along with depictions of bright green cartoon viruses wearing a crown, along with a figure resembling the grim reaper. The video promotes the measures recommended by healthcare professionals, including cleanliness of surroundings, social distancing and hand washing.

== Release and reception ==
The song was released on Min's YouTube channel on February 23, 2020. An English-language version was released on April 9. It was produced by Khắc Hưng and Mew Amazing. The original Vietnamese song has since seen the addition of subtitles in over 25 languages.

Vietnamese dancer Quang Đăng created the "Ghen Cô Vy" dance challenge. In an interview with CBS News, he said that the representative and project lead of the NIOEH campaign asked him to create a dance that could go viral and cause the song to trend. He stated that he was able to choreograph the dance in 15 minutes. The hashtag #GhenCoVyChallenge had since gained over 21.5 million views on the video-sharing app TikTok. Quang Đăng's dance video was also promoted by the United Nations Children's Fund (UNICEF). Various videos of people responding to the challenge had garnered over 2 million views on TikTok.

Comedian and television host John Oliver, host of the American talk show Last Week Tonight with John Oliver, called the song a "genuine club-banger". German weekly Stern praised the song for its ability to spread information in an innovative fashion without underestimating the seriousness of the situation. Huffington Post praised the song for the dance steps in the video. It also received praise from South Korea's Seoul Broadcasting System, while France's BFM TV stated that the song might have helped avert a potential large-scale pandemic devastation in Vietnam.

Following the success of "Ghen Cô Vy", other Southeast Asian governments have taken to social media to release COVID-19 public service announcements. In Bangkok, Thailand, BTS Skytrain released a video titled "Dance Against the Virus" featuring staff cleaning handrails inside trains and disinfecting surfaces, while in the Philippines, health officials released a video on etiquette related to coughing and social distancing and called people to join the #covidance challenge. The Singaporean government released a video featuring comedian Gurmit Singh talking about hygiene and cleanliness. Malaysian animation studio, Monsta Studios, also created a PSA video and song named Ayuh Cuci Tangan! (in English: Let’s Wash Our Hands), featuring two animated characters - Papa Zola & Pipi Zola, similar to Vietnam's approach with Ghen Cô Vy. Ayuh Cuci Tangan! is reported to gain around 3 to 4 million views and to be shared in some TV stations in Malaysia, Indonesia and Brunei.

The Daily Bruin reported that the English-language department of the University of California, Los Angeles was offering a freshman seminar course on the cultural impact of COVID-19, in which "Ghen Cô Vy" and other TikTok dance challenges and viral memes centered around the pandemic were studied.

== Cover version ==
New York-based indie folk Americana band The Good Morning Nags released a cover version of "Ghen Cô Vy" on 11 March 2020. The song uses English-language translations of the original Vietnamese song, with some lyrical alterations to reflect the pandemic situation in the United States. The band said that it wanted to use the song to raise awareness after the virus started spreading in New York. Khắc Hưng commented on the cover version, calling it "really great".
