= Digital divide in Vietnam =

Differences in access to information technologies

The digital divide in Vietnam refers to inequalities between individuals, households, and other groups of different demographic and socioeconomic levels in Vietnam in access to information and communication technologies ("ICTs") and in the knowledge and skills needed to effectively use the information gained from connecting.

The digital divide in Vietnam stems from sociopolitical, economic, and technological issues, but over the last decade the country has made great strides in providing large-scale Internet access and more lax restrictions in order to bridge this gap. Though the majority of Vietnam is rural, more than half of the country's population has access to the Internet. Despite these limitations on technology, organizations around the world are working directly with the people of Vietnam to close the digital divide.

== Internet demographics ==
Vietnam has a population of 96 million people, and 34.9% of the population is urban. Despite this, 53% of the country's population currently has access to the Internet. According to a study conducted by market research company Statista in 2016, more than 91 percent of daily Internet users were between the ages of 25 and 34. However, despite the expansion in access, Internet quality remains poor in rural areas, and Vietnam ranks 16th among other Asian countries with the most Internet users. Vietnam also has a slower average data transfer speed than neighbor countries. Compared to Singapore's average of 16.5 Mbit/s, Vietnam's average is 5.0 Mbit/s.

== Government censorship ==
For individuals with access to the Internet, government censorship becomes another obstacle because the three Internet service providers in Vietnam (FPT Telecom, Viet Nam Post and Telecommunications Corporation, and Viettel) are owned by the government and military. The Vietnamese government restricts user access to websites that are critical of the government or feature politically sensitive content, as well as the websites of select human rights organizations. In 2016, Facebook and Instagram were temporarily blocked in an effort by the government to crack down on social media due to rising unrest in Hanoi and Ho Chi Minh City, where hundreds of citizens protested in city streets regarding the government's delayed response to an environmental disaster in which millions of dead fish washed ashore. It was believed by locals to be the fault of Formosa Plastics.

== Increasing information and communication technology ==
In 2011, The World Bank extended a project for an additional two years in an attempt to complete the process of installing software and conducting training. This technology and training would potentially allow for the expansion of small businesses, enhance current operating systems and disseminate information on a larger scale. Due to the slow Internet speeds in Vietnam, obtaining information was difficult. However, this attempt at closing the digital divide was unsuccessful and expensive, totaling 106.97 million US dollars. Although this project was unsuccessful, organizations are still working to solve the issue of the digital divide.
