= Min (Vietnamese singer) =

Vietnamese musical artist

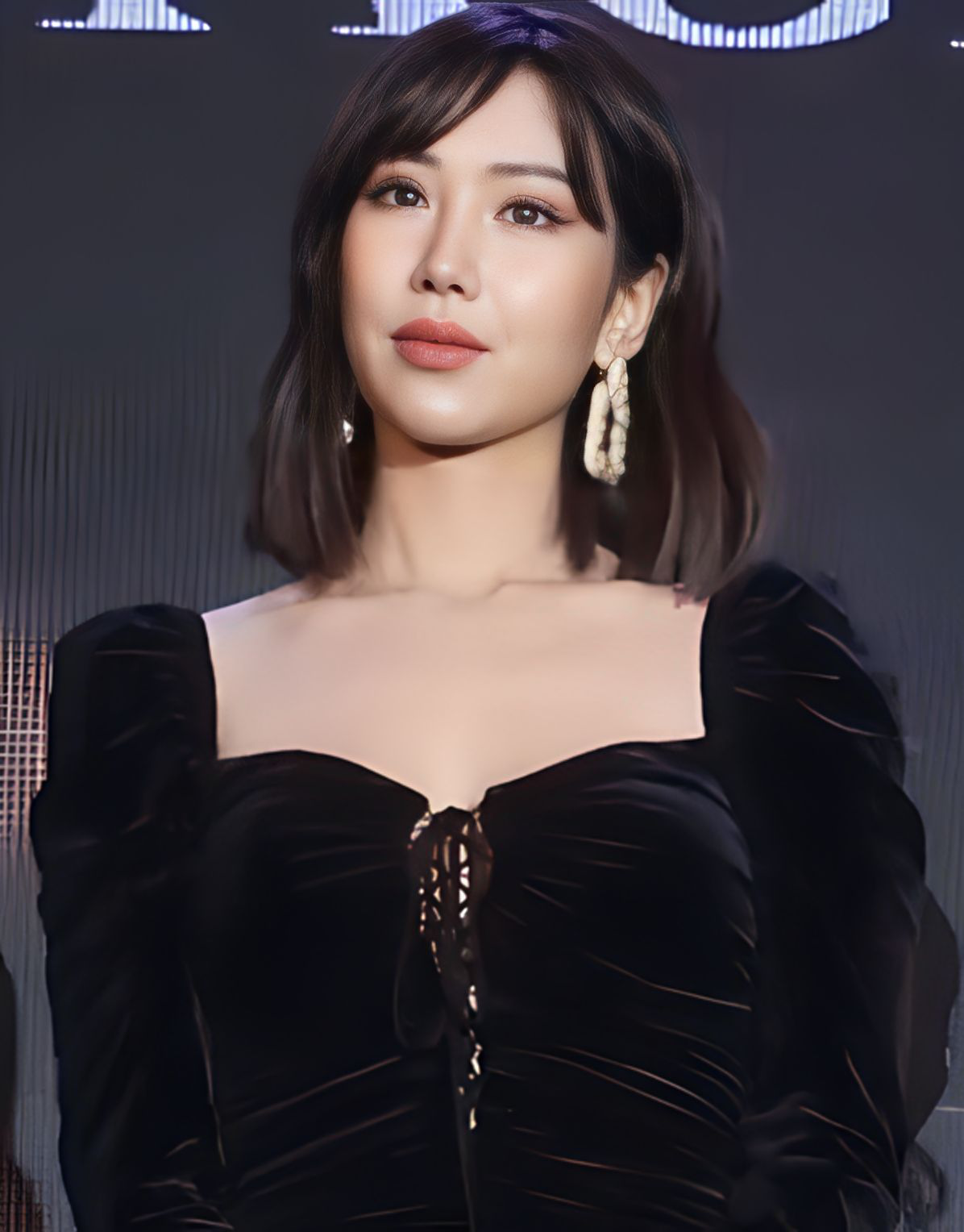
- Min in 2020

Background information
- Born: Nguyễn Minh Hằng; December 7, 1988 (age 37); Hanoi, Vietnam
- Genre: V-pop
- Occupations: Singer; dancer
- Years active: 2012-

Nguyễn Minh Hằng (born 7 December 1988), known professionally as Min, is a Vietnamese singer and dancer.

== Background ==
Min was born in Hanoi. At age 13, she moved with her family to Germany, where her parents worked for the Vietnamese embassy. Min graduated with a bachelor's degree from European University Viadrina (in Frankfurt an der Oder, Germany) and worked for two years as a film production specialist and graphic designer in Germany.

== Career ==
In 2012, her family became burdened by debt after some misfortune, and they moved back to Vietnam, where Min had to support them with her job as an editor for a TV channel. As a self-taught dancer, she joined the local St.319 dance group. In 2013, St.319 became a music group, with Min as the lead singer. Her first breakthrough as a singer was with the song "Y.E.U", which topped Vietnamese charts.

In 2016, Min left St.319 to pursue a solo career as a singer. However her songs only had limited success, and Min reached a low in her singing career. With the song "Có em chờ" released in 2017, her music reached critical popularity again. In May of the same year, the song "Ghen", which she sang together with Erik, was released and topped charts.

After an absence of around a year, Min returned in 2019 with the song "Đừng yêu nữa em mệt rồi". In 2020, the song "Ghen Cô Vy", based on Min and Erik's 2017 hit, attracted worldwide attention as it spread awareness about COVID-19 prevention measures. Min also donated "10,000 medical face masks and 500 bottles of hand sanitizers to the National Hospital of Tropical Diseases".

== Discography ==
=== Studio album ===
Title	Album details
50/50	Released: March 21, 2022; Labels: MIN; Formats: Music download, streaming, CD

=== Singles ===
As lead artist

Title	Year	Peak chart positions		Album	Ref
Title	Year	VIE		Album	Ref
"Tìm (Lost)" (feat. Mr.A)	2013	(Note: Billboard Vietnam was launched on January 14, 2022.)		Tìm	
"Nhớ (Stuck)"	2014	(Note: Billboard Vietnam was launched on January 14, 2022.)		Stuck	
"Get Out"	2014	(Note: Billboard Vietnam was launched on January 14, 2022.)		Stuck	
"Luôn Bên Anh" (feat. Mr.A)	2014	(Note: Billboard Vietnam was launched on January 14, 2022.)		Non-album single	
"Y.Ê.U"	2015	(Note: Billboard Vietnam was launched on January 14, 2022.)		Y.Ê.U	
"Shine Your Light" (feat. JustaTee)	2015	(Note: Billboard Vietnam was launched on January 14, 2022.)		Non-album single	
"Up To You"	2015	(Note: Billboard Vietnam was launched on January 14, 2022.)		Up To You	
"Take Me Away"	2016	(Note: Billboard Vietnam was launched on January 14, 2022.)		Take Me Away	
"Gọi Tên Em"	2016	(Note: Billboard Vietnam was launched on January 14, 2022.)		Non-album single	
"Có Em Chờ" (feat. Mr.A)	2017	(Note: Billboard Vietnam was launched on January 14, 2022.)	93	Non-album single	
"Ghen" (with Khắc Hưng & Erik)	2017	(Note: Billboard Vietnam was launched on January 14, 2022.)		Non-album single	
"Hôn Anh"	2017	(Note: Billboard Vietnam was launched on January 14, 2022.)		Non-album single	
"Em Mới Là Người Yêu Anh (The One Who Loves You)"	2018	(Note: Billboard Vietnam was launched on January 14, 2022.)		Non-album single	
"Đừng Yêu Nữa, Em Mệt Rồi"	2019	(Note: Billboard Vietnam was launched on January 14, 2022.)		Non-album single	
"Vì Yêu Cứ Đâm Đầu" (with Đen Vâu and JustaTee)	2019	(Note: Billboard Vietnam was launched on January 14, 2022.)		Non-album single	
"Trên Tình Bạn Dưới Tình Yêu"	2020	58	37	50/50	
"Cà Phê"	2022	9	8	50/50	
"Not a Good Time for Love"	2023	—	—	Non-album single	
"(từng là) Boyfriend, Girlfriend"	2025	—	—		

As featured artist

Title	Year	Peak chart positions		Album	Ref
Title	Year	VIE		Album	Ref
"Đừng Xin Lỗi Nữa" (Erik feat. Min)	2018			OST Lala - Hãy Để Em Yêu Anh	
"Bài Này Chill Phết" (Đen Vâu feat. Min)	2019	26	18	Non-album single	
"Em Muốn Ăn Gì?" (OSAD feat. Min)	2019			Non-album single	
"Chuyện Nhà Bé Thôi, Con Đừng Về" (Kai Đinh & MIN)	2021			Non-album single	
"để tôi ôm em bằng giai điệu này" (Kai Đinh feat. MIN & GREY D)	2022	8	5	winter warmer	
"Girls Like Me Don't Cry" (remix) (thuy feat. MIN)	2023	13 (Note: "girls like me don't cry" peaked at number #9 on the Billboard Vietnam Hot 100 prior to the release of the remix version. The remix version was credited starting from the chart date of March 23, 2023, at its highest position of #13. "girls like me don't cry (remix)". March 23, 2023. Archived from the original on 2023-03-23.)	—	Non-album single	
"Điều Vô Tri Nhất" (with Kai Đinh)	2024	—	—		

=== Promotional singles ===
Title	Year	Peak chart positions		Album	Ref
Title	Year	VIE Hot		Album	Ref
"Nếu Như Một Ngày" (feat. Rhymastic)	2016			Take Me Away	
"Chưa Bao Giờ Mẹ Kể" (feat. Erik)	2017			Non-album promotional single	
"Người Em Tìm Kiếm"	2017			Non-album promotional single	
"STEPS2FAME"	2018			Non-album promotional single	
"Hè Phải Bay" (feat. Mr.A)	2018			Non-album promotional single	
"Hòa Nhịp Giáng Sinh"	2019			Non-album promotional single	
"Ghen Cô Vy (Washing Hand Song)" (with Khắc Hưng & Erik)	2020			Non-album promotional single	
"LoveNote" (with Binz)	2020			Non-album promotional single	
"MLEM MLEM" (with JustaTee & Yuno Bigboi)	2020			Non-album promotional single	
"If You Have A Dream" (feat. R.Tee, Kai Đinh & Tinle)	2021			Diệu Kỳ Việt Nam	
"Ơi Ơi Ơi"	2021			Non-album promotional single	
"Hít Vào Thở Ra" (with HIEUTHUHAI)	2021			Non-album promotional single	
"Nghỉ Đón Tết?!" (Ricky Star feat. Min & Hoaprox)	2022	—	—	Non-album promotional single	
"Tìm X"	2022	—	—	Non-album promotional single	

=== Other charted songs ===
Title	Year	Peak chart positions		Album	Ref
Title	Year	VIE Hot	VIE Top	Album	Ref
"Phải Lòng Anh"	2022	—	76	50/50	
