= Vietnamese government response to the COVID-19 pandemic =

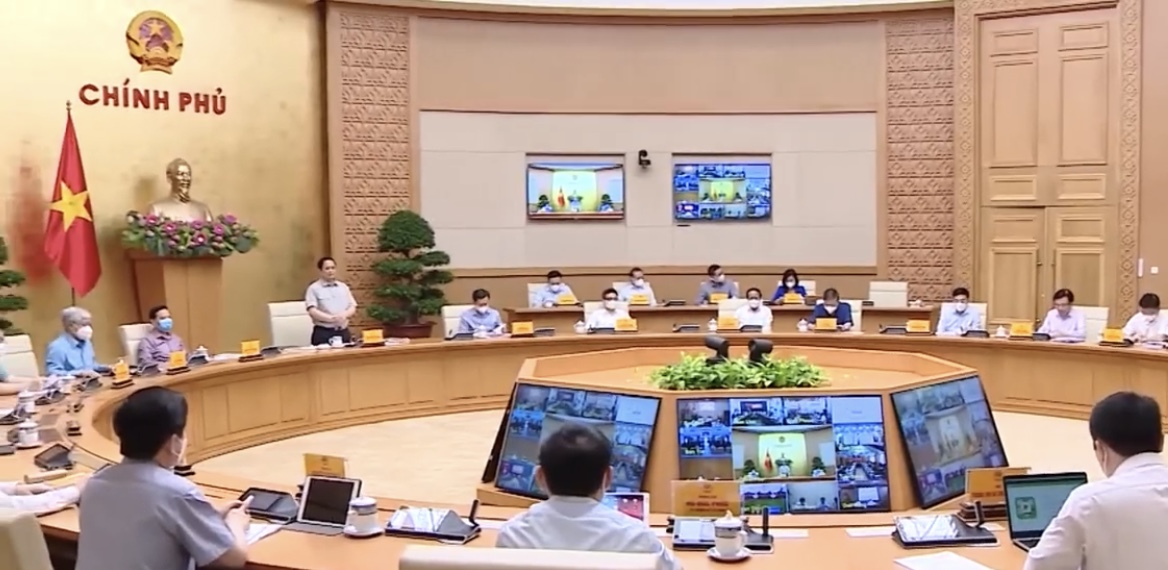
A 2021 Vietnamese government meeting on COVID-19.

The government of Vietnam prepared for the COVID-19 pandemic as early as the first cases in China emerged in December 2019, and pursued a zero-COVID strategy until September 2021.

In January 2020, Vietnam's Prime Minister Nguyễn Xuân Phúc ordered measures to prevent and counter the spread of the disease into Vietnam, as well as to warn Vietnamese citizens to avoid visiting areas with outbreaks. During the same year, authorities enacted several lockdowns in response to localised outbreaks. Contact tracing and social distancing measures were rolled out, and Vietnam's communications and propaganda apparatus dispelled information about the disease. In 2021, a vaccination programme began, whilst outbreaks in Ho Chi Minh City and Hanoi prompted the government to introduce further lockdowns, which were ultimately lifted due to their economic and social impacts, and continued spread of the Delta variant.

Reception for the government's response was mixed. While the government's decisiveness and effectiveness in controlling the disease during 2020 received high public approval and international recognition, outbreaks the following year and low vaccine uptake signalled a decline in public trust. The human rights implications of some interventions attracted controversy, whilst the Việt Á corruption scandal related to COVID-19 testing kits led to several senior officials resigning, being removed from office, or facing prosecution and imprisonment for corruption.

== Advance preparations ==
According to Kidong Park, World Health Organization representative to Vietnam, the first risk assessment exercise was conducted by the Vietnamese in early January – soon after cases in China started being reported. On 3 January 2020, the day before the WHO said there was a cluster of cases in Wuhan, Vietnam tightened control at the Vietnam-China border. The Ministry of Health held a meeting with the WHO and the US Centers for Disease Control and Prevention (CDC) as early as 15 January, weeks before many other countries even started strategizing. These combined efforts of quick action and effective testing helped slow the spread of the virus in its earliest stages.

Regional COVID-19 prevention task forces were established, and these groups were prepared for deployment by the Ministry of Health to provincial treatment sites. In view of an assumed increased infection risk among medical staff as had been seen during the SARS outbreak, personal protective equipment was stockpiled, and infection control measures were heightened at hospitals.

On 23 January, Vietnam confirmed its first case. Shortly afterward, the Prime Minister Nguyễn Xuân Phúc ramped up Vietnam's response by issuing an urgent document to ministries, provinces, and broadcasting agencies addressing the dangerousness of the virus and the need for measures to prevent local transmission. On 24 January, just one day after the first cases, the Civil Aviation Administration of Vietnam ordered the cancellation of all flights from and to Wuhan. As Vietnam celebrated the Tết holiday, the Prime Minister declared war on the coronavirus. "Fighting this epidemic is like fighting the enemy", he said at an urgent Communist Party meeting on 27 January.

On 31 January, infectious disease expert Nguyễn Thanh Long was appointed as deputy Minister of Health and later as Minister of Health, he served as one of the main government advisors regarding the pandemic. On the same day, Vietnam implemented stricter measures, suspending inbound and outbound flights related to the epicenters in China, restricting tourists, dosing train connection, and suggested people suspend trade and other exchange activities between the two countries. Such a decision to limit cross-border transactions with China indicated the extent of the government's commitment to prioritizing public health.

In January, the government also issued the first National Response Plan and assembled the National Steering Committee (NSC). The committee, led by Deputy Prime Minister Vũ Đức Đam with representation from 14 ministries and sectors, the National Assembly, media, and information technology companies will command and control the country COVID-19 response. Vietnam has 63 provincial health departments, an approximately 600 district health centers and more than 11,000 primary health stations. While hospitals provide medical care for COVID-19 patients, the primary health stations are responsible for prevention activities and total support for hospitals. In fact, an approximately 97,000 health officers at community level in these sections serve as the workers to provide information, advice, guidance, and isolation facilities if needed.

In February 2020, Vietnamese Ministry of Education and Training suspended all school activities across the country until the end of March as part of quarantine measures against the spreading of the virus, and later extended this till the middle of April until further notice. Aggressive measures were also taken to combat possible outbreaks, from 14 days quarantine to restriction of outdoor activities (some sources believe it was more than 20 to 40 days under quarantine), the Vietnam People's Armed Forces also takes part on patrolling and controlling measures. Sixty-eight military camps with a capacity of 40,000 people were set up to receive people ordered into quarantine.

The first case of mass quarantine in Vietnam took place on February 12 in Sơn Lôi, Vĩnh Phúc, a community of 10,000 people for 20 days over seven coronavirus cases – the first large-scale lockdown known outside China. Aggressive preventive action enabled Vietnam to contain the earlier outbreaks, with only 16 cases, all recovered, by the end of February.

On the night of 6 March, when the 17th case was reported in Hanoi, the city held an urgent meeting, then coordinated with related ministries — including the Ministry of Health, Ministry of Public Security, and Ministry of Transportation — to prevent the virus from spreading to the community. Thanks to this effective coordination, public health measures such as aggressive contact tracing, mandatory quarantine, and sterilization of surfaces were taken immediately, which enabled the government to stop community transmission and lift the large-scale lockdown still common in many Southeast Asian nations at that time. On March 7, Hanoi locked down Trúc Bạch Street, where the patient resided along with 66 households and 189 people. The quarantine was lifted on March 20 after no new cases were reported after testing. Imported cases from Europe motivated the government to intensify its border control measures, reducing international flights, suspending visa waiver for certain European countries.

When the Bạch Mai Hospital in Hanoi became a coronavirus hotspot with dozens of cases in late March, the authorities imposed a lockdown on the facility and tracked down nearly 100,000 people related to the hospital, including medics, patients, visitors and their close contacts.

== Lockdowns ==
=== April nationwide isolation ===
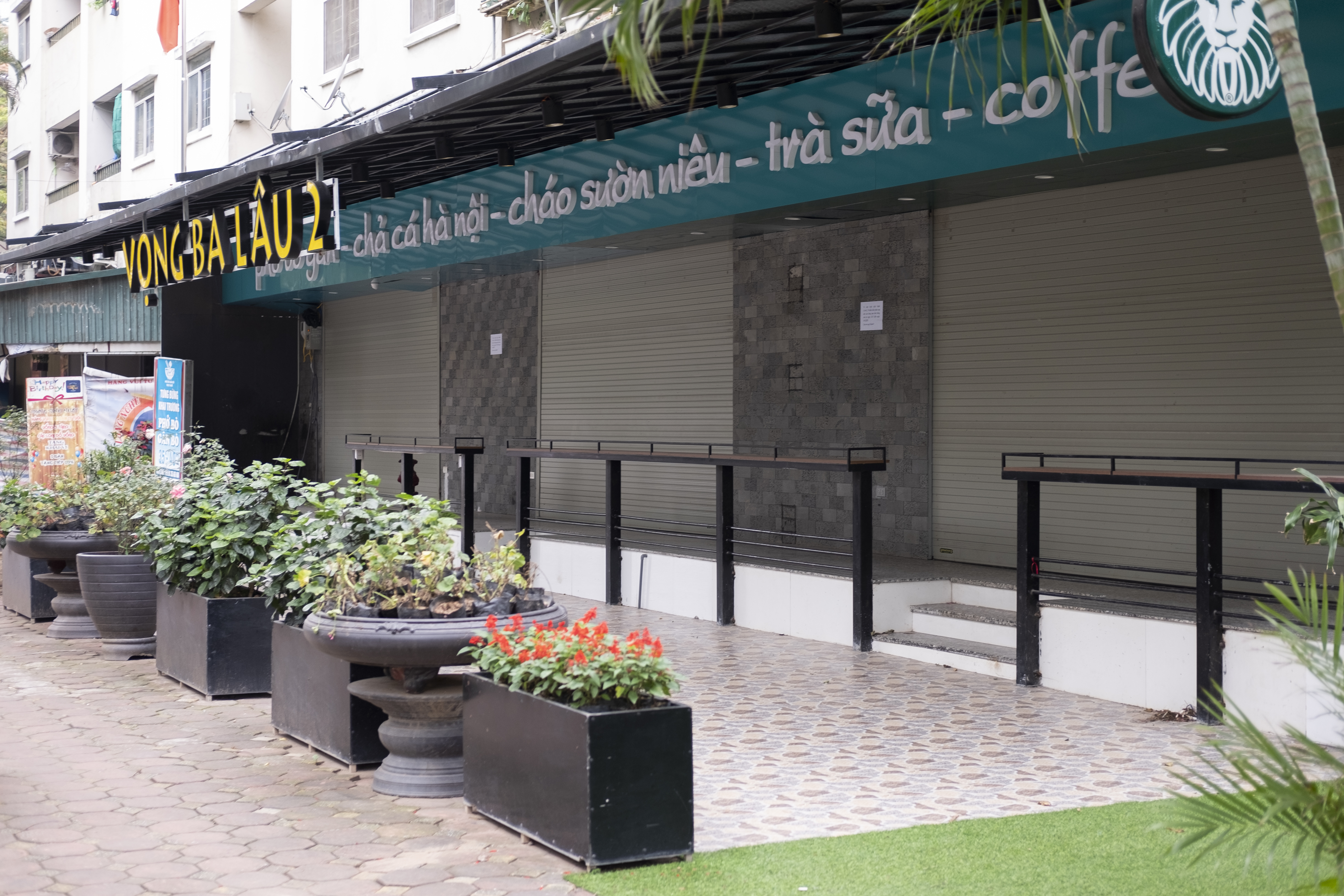
Many public areas such as schools and restaurants had to be closed until 15 April 2020.

On 31 March 2020, the Vietnamese government ordered a nationwide isolation of 15 days from 1 to 15 April. From 16 April, local airlines could raise the number of domestic flights, which were subsequently further increased on 23 April and again on 29 April.

On 23 April 2020, Vietnamese government lifted social isolation rules, subsequently allowing re-opening of non-essential services including restaurants. On the same day, schools across the country could be re-opened, with dates varying per each province and city case.

Everyone who enters Vietnam from abroad, however, continued to be quarantined upon arrival for 14 days. From 23 April, plans for repatriation flights to bring Vietnamese citizens abroad back to Vietnam were re-newed, with an initial plan for 13 flights. Among the flights conducted was notably the first-ever direct flight in history operated by Vietnam Airlines from Vietnam to the United States on 7 May.

From 9 May, cinemas were reopened. On 11 May, Vietnamese government started a nationwide tourism campaign, named 'Vietnamese travel Vietnam', to increase domestic demand for travelling and promote domestic tourism.

=== Da Nang lockdown ===
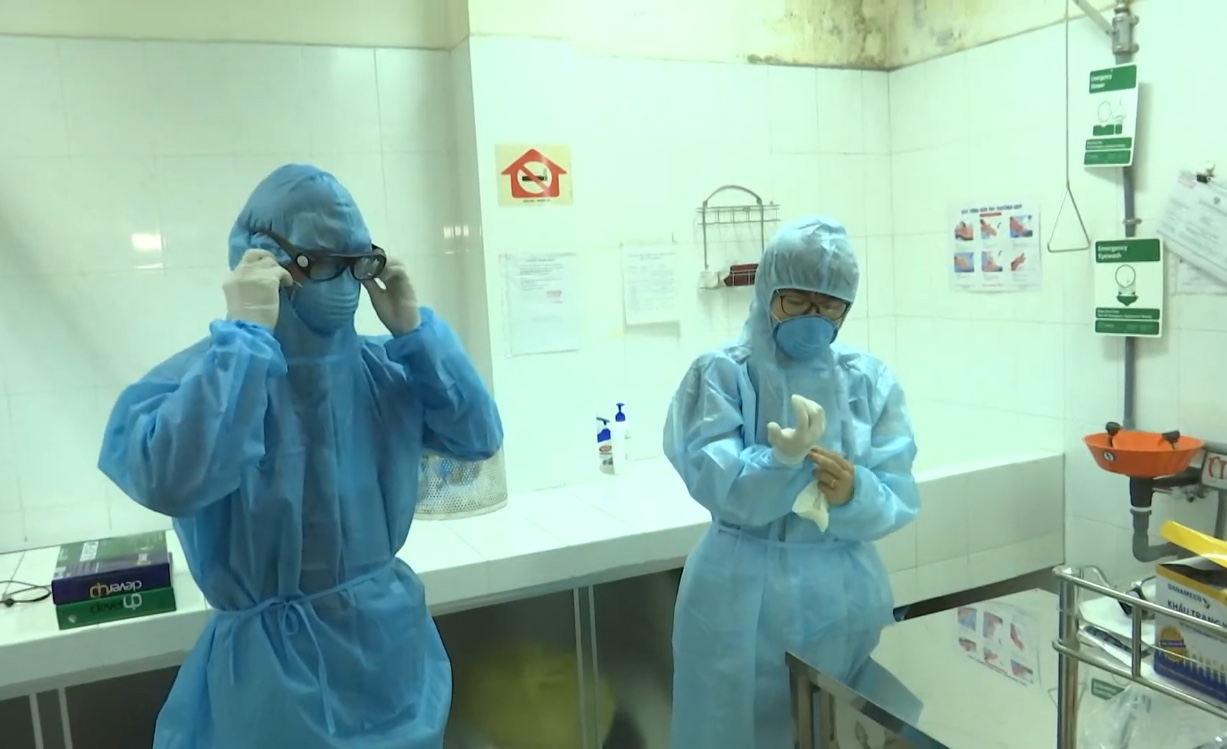
Two Da Nang medical workers wearing protective suits before performing COVID test.

In late-July 2020, Vietnam was placed on high alert after the government confirmed dozens of community infections, the first since April, all in or around Da Nang.

On 27 July, the government made the decision to evacuate 80,000 people from Da Nang. The government said the process would take four days with domestic airlines operating approximately 100 flights daily from Da Nang to 11 cities around the country.

On the same day, the Da Nang Municipal People's Committee announced restrictions applicable for 15 days, starting from 28 July. Six districts in quarantine area include: Hai Chau, Thanh Khe, Son Tra, Ngu Hanh Son, Cam Le, and Lien Chieu District with more than one million people requested to stay at home and only go out in case of extreme necessity such as buying food, medicine, seeking essential goods and services, and medical emergencies. All educational and non-essential services in the city was closed. Face masks were mandated in public and people were ordered to frequently wash their hands with soap or alcoholic sanitisers. Gatherings of more than two people in public are disallowed and maintenance of a minimum distance of 2 meters is required. All types of public transport were halted and personal vehicles were heavily restricted. The Da Nang Department of Health was asked to promptly organize epidemiological investigation, contact-tracing in areas related to the confirmed cases, and massive testing to early detect infection sources and high-risk cases.

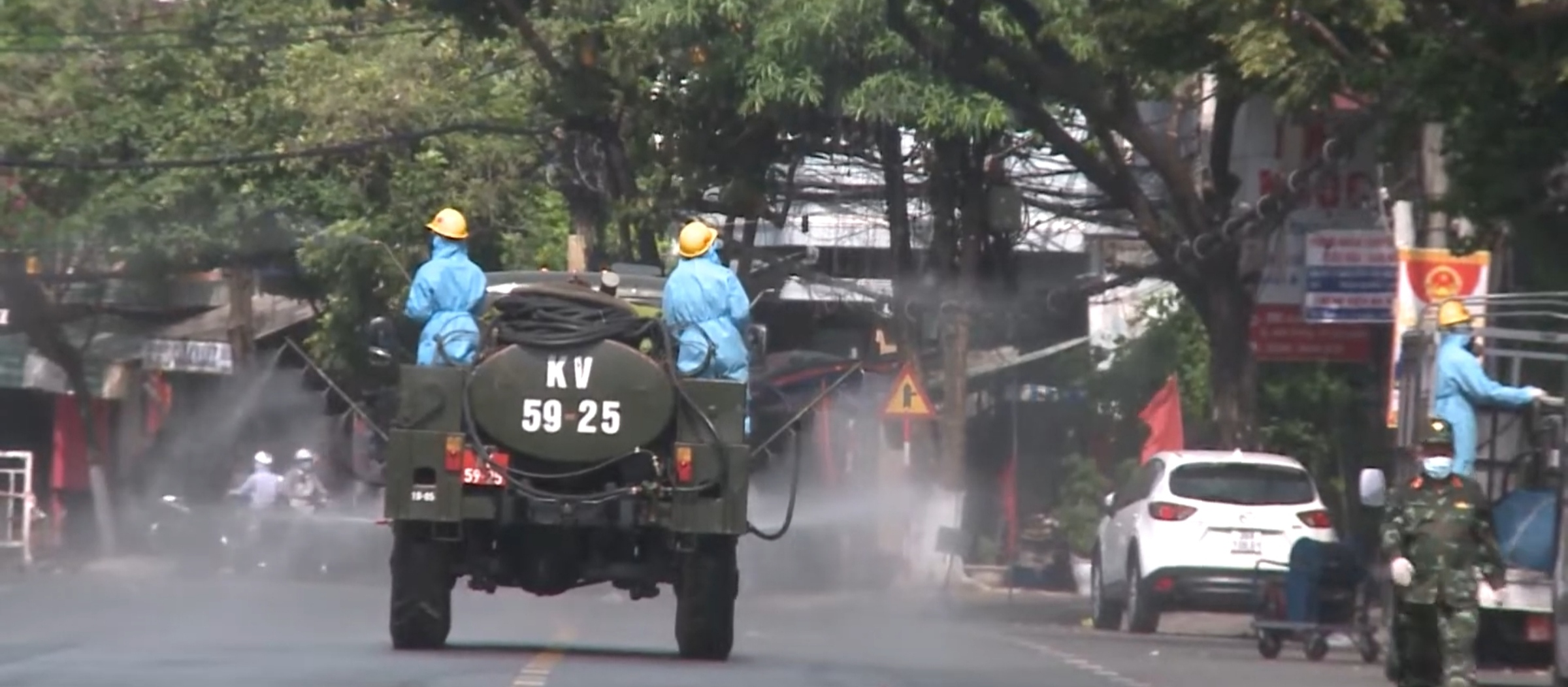
A Vietnam People's Army Chemical Arms personnel disinfecting Danang's streets during the pandemic.

The rural district of Hoa Vang was the last district to be quarantined, starts from 13:00, 28 July 2020. On 31 July, the neighboring city of Hội An were also placed under quarantine for 15 days after at least 4 people tested positive with COVID-19.

The authorities also decided to lockdown four hospitals: Da Nang C Hospital, Da Nang Hospital, Da Nang Orthopedic and Rehabilitation Hospital and Hoan My Hospital where the patients visited just before they were confirmed positive for COVID-19.

According to the regulation of the Ministry of Transport issued on 27 July to prevent the COVID-19 pandemic:

After the midnight of 28 July 2020, Da Nang International Airport will be temporarily closed. All public vehicles such as tourist buses, taxis, public buses in the area of Da Nang must stop operating, except for government vehicles, emergency vehicles and any vehicles transporting necessities. Any car traveling through Da Nang cannot stop to pick up passengers in the city.

Vietnam Railways has been instructed to suspend the operation of passenger trains to and from Da Nang station. North–South trains are still operating normally on the route but do not stop when entering the city area. Passenger boats and ferry services originating from Da Nang are also prohibited. Aircraft, ships and vehicles transporting cargo are not affected by this regulation.

On 12 August, Da Nang has decided to continue social distancing for another two weeks when the number of cases in the community still shows no signs of stopping. The local government also issued "shopping coupons" for residents, each family will be given five coupons to use within 15 days, in order to prevent large gatherings at markets.

Da Nang is an example [of the importance] of human resources, medical facility. Despite many efforts but the central government still have to total mobilize to support. If an epidemic occurs in a mountainous province it will be even more difficult. Must be determined that from now on there will be no time of peace, but the readiness for an outbreak.

— Nguyen Thanh Long, the Acting Minister of Health

=== July 2021–present ===
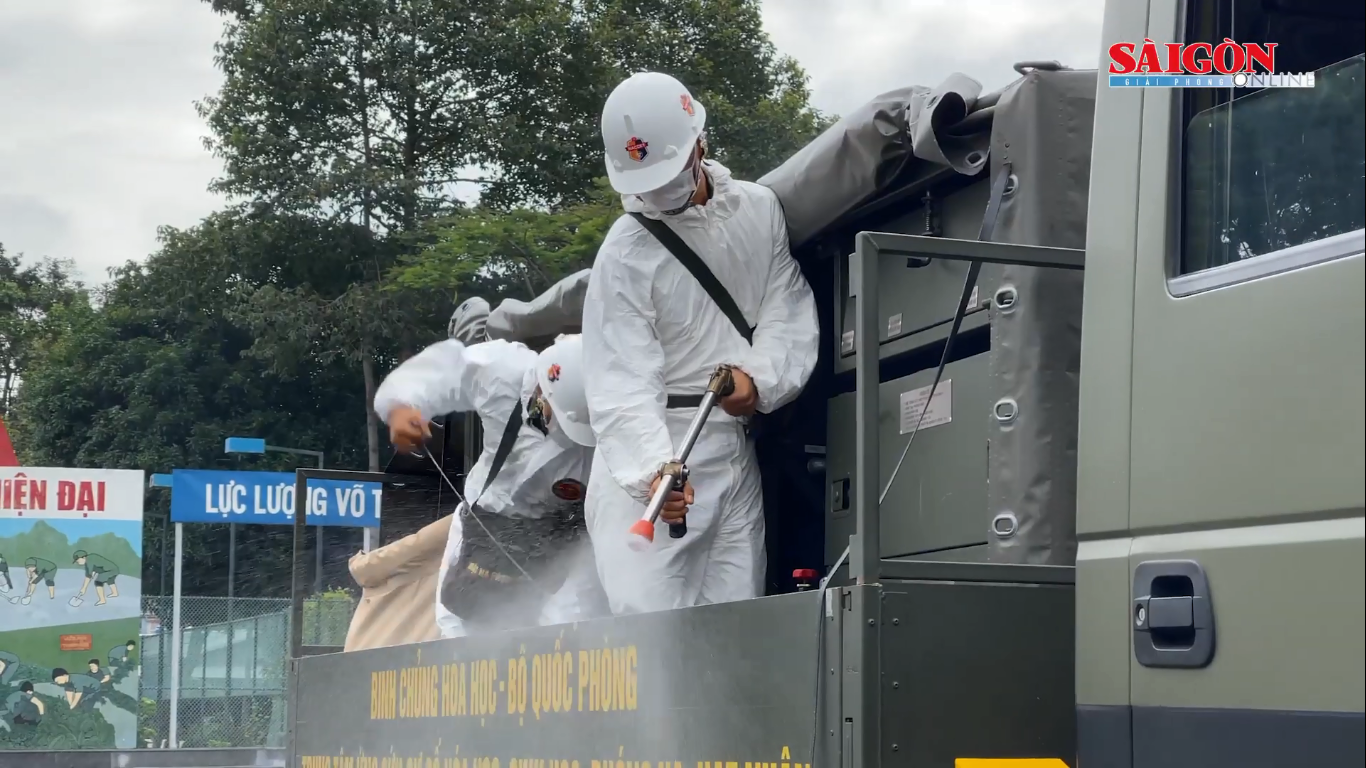
Street disinfection in Ho Chi Minh City during the 2021 outbreak.

From 9 February to 1 March 2021, facing an increase in cases, Ho Chi Minh City closed down spas, wedding halls, cinemas, clubs and other entertainment venues. On 25 May, entertainment venues and public spaces were again closed. On 31 May, strict social distancing measures were again imposed in all of Ho Chi Minh City, closing down all non-essential services. Remote work was advised and no dine-in was allowed in restaurants. On 9 July 2021, all of Ho Chi Minh City was placed into hard lockdown. In and out movements outside the city, excepts goods, were stopped. Fines were imposed for venturing outside without a valid reason such as buying foods. On 19 July, stricter restrictions were imposed forcing all restaurants, markets and businesses to be closed down. On 26 July, a night curfew was ordered, forbidding all movements after 6pm. This was later extended to 1 August. Hanoi was also placed under lockdown on 23 July.

In Ho Chi Minh City and Bình Dương Province, officials instructed factories to follow the "three on site" model, which required workers to eat, sleep, and work on the factory grounds. Factory owners hurried to supply tents and bathrooms for their employees, who were crowded into warehouses and parking lots. As a result, hundreds of factory workers became infected while other many firms made the decision to stop producing because they couldn't afford to house their employees. Thousands of workers found themselves suddenly without a form of income. The issue has shaken an industry that has evolved to become the world's second-largest garment and footwear supplier behind China.

Ho Chi Minh City and Binh Duong Province, known as the country's "locomotive," are home to two of Vietnam's major industrial parks. According to government figures, roughly 1.3 million workers returned to their hometowns between July and September, then hundreds of thousands more followed once restrictions were eased in October. To restore production, managers have made calls promising higher wages to get the workers to return. The government of Ho Chi Minh City said on 22 October that workers willing to return would receive free transportation and lodging for the first month. Some of the measures have worked. Pouyuen Vietnam's workforce has returned to Ho Chi Minh City in large numbers, according to the company.

== Contact tracing ==
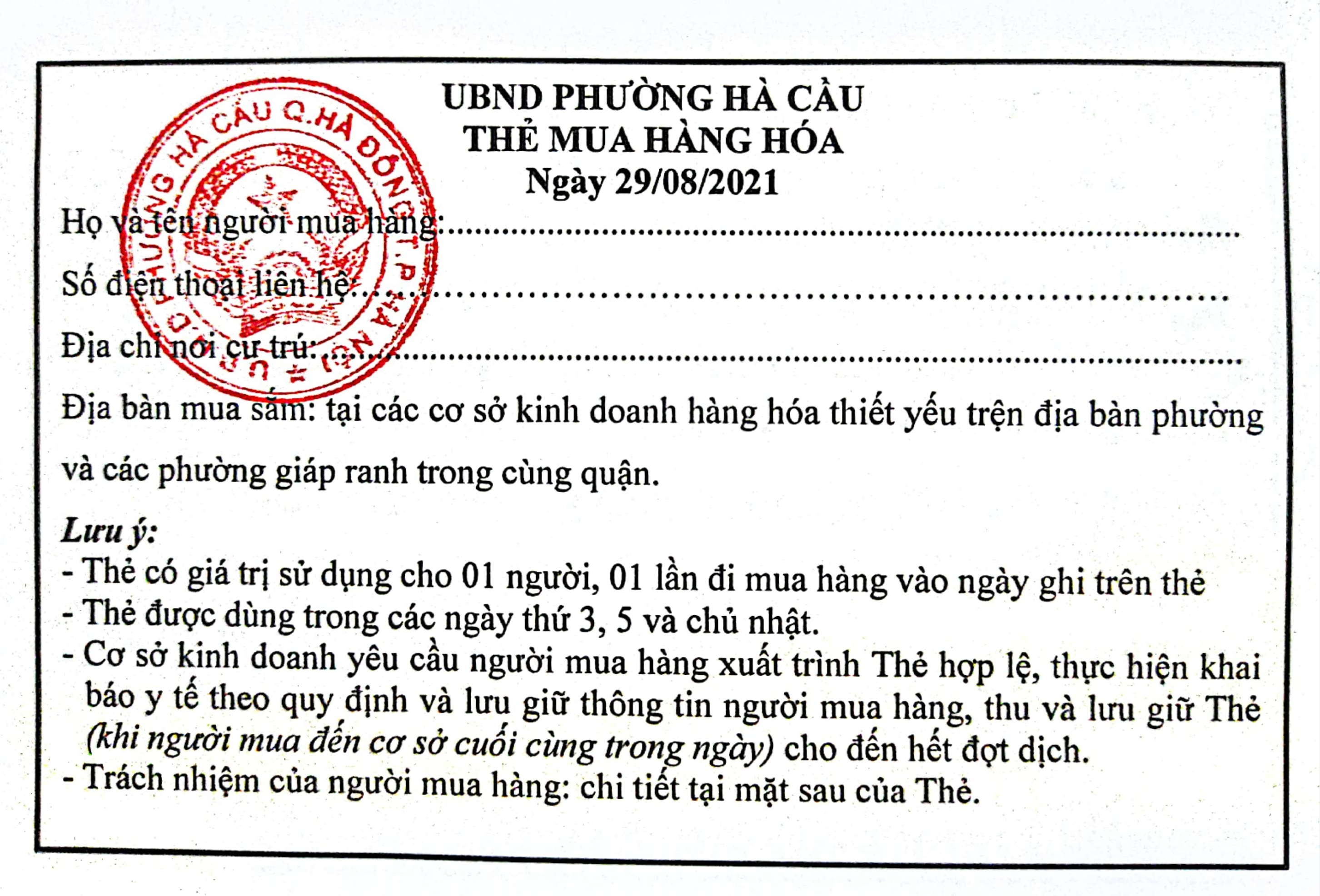
An example of a shopping coupon, it is used to manage the number of people entering market or supermarket.

In April 2020, Vietnamese cyber security firm Bkav launched Bluezone, an application that uses Bluetooth low energy positioning technology to detect people in close contact with infected people via smartphones quickly, and accurately. Smartphones with Bluezone installed can communicate with each other, record close contact at a distance of 2 meters, when and for how long to help users know and control patient contacts COVID-19. These app has drawn concerns about users information safety and their privacy. Gathering all citizens data in one place will make tracing disease easier and more efficient, but it also means that Bluezone, will know users contacted with whom, for how long, and when. From this information it can find out the social graph of the majority of people in the country.

However, in reality, the application of information technology in epidemic prevention still has many problems. For example, in Ho Chi Minh City, COVID-19 outbreak has triggered a growing demand for a large amount of personal health declaration, but testing registration process in here still rely on verbal communication between local authorities and citizens without any online services. Each family is given a paper test registration form, which they must bring to the testing site after filled in all the information. Administrative procedures in Vietnam are sometimes only symbolically available online and people still have to go to the government buildings to complete the important parts. In Vietnamese society, there is a lack of digital readiness among the generations. People over 45 years old accounts for barely 10% of all internet users. Another severe issue shown by the COVID-19 pandemic is a lack of cooperation among several government agencies, as well as insufficient information synchronization between them.

== Public communication and propaganda ==
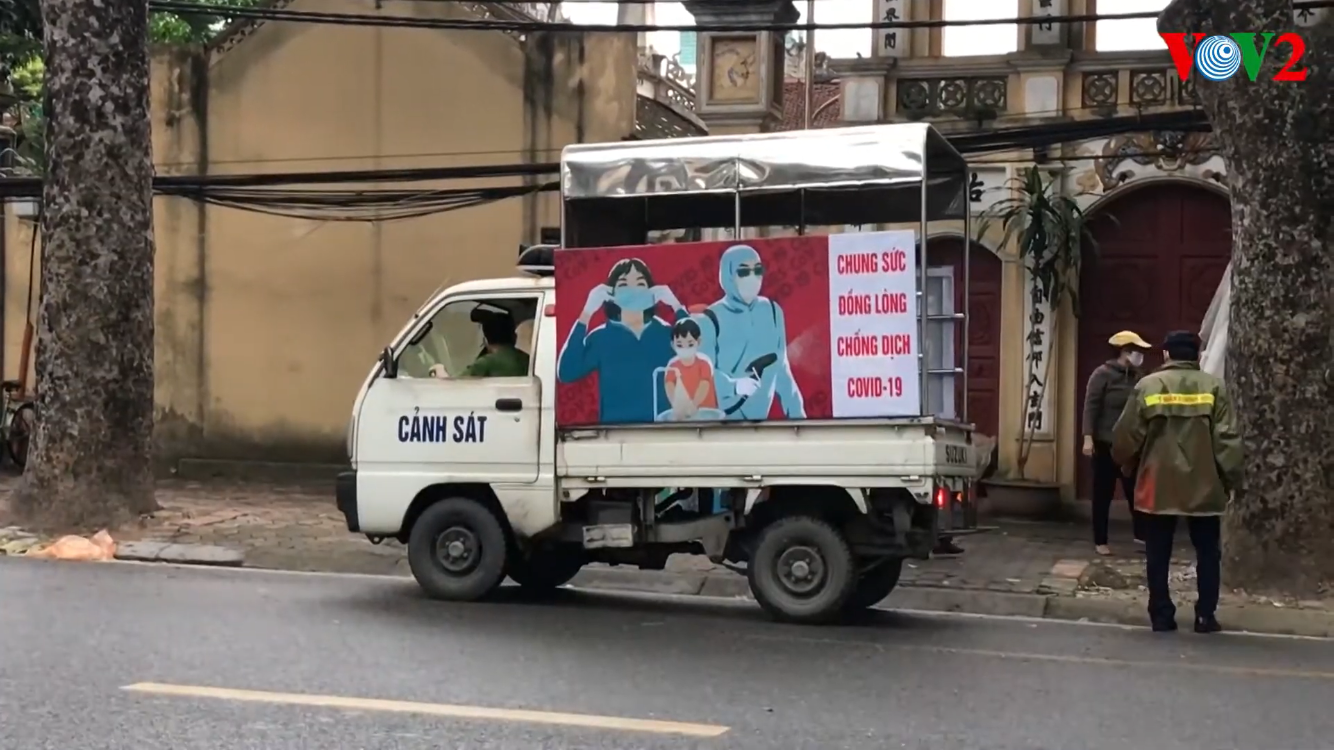
A police car in Hanoi with COVID-19 public health messaging

The Vietnamese government using social media platforms to keep the public informed of COVID-19 news and instructions. Thong Tin Chinh Phu (Governmental Information), the government's official Facebook page, provides nearly hourly updates on the country's pandemic situation. Zalo, a popular Vietnamese messaging app, has also evolved into a channel through which information can be quickly transmitted from authorities to the citizens. On 9 March 2020, the health declaration application named NCOVI was officially launched. After installing NCOVI application on smartphones, people enter full personal information as required to start using. Based on the data submitted, the health system will know the cases that need attention to ensure the fastest and most effective medical assistance.

Since the beginning of the pandemic, the government has communicated clearly with the public, setting up websites and telephone hotlines to update on the latest situations. The Ministry of Health also regularly sent out reminders to citizens via text messaging and apps during the crisis, as well as publishing extensive amounts of data and information about the outbreak. Messages on preventive measures such as wearing of mask and physical distancing have been reinforced using infographics and audio-visual materials. On a busy day, the national hotlines alone could receive 20,000 calls, not to count the hundreds of provincial and district-level hotlines. Wartime loudspeakers are also used to urge people to stay vigilant.

Vietnam is also relying on its propaganda apparatus to help tackle the COVID-19 pandemic. The Central Propaganda Department is responsible for disseminating the propaganda through mass media. Their efforts usually focus on the nationalism, successful measures by the government to control the pandemic, the steady improvement of the situation across the country and the advantages of the one-party political system in dealing with crisis. On the streets, public art in the style of Cold War-era propaganda posters has flourished, exalting nurses instead of guerrillas. The government and local media outlets have used the phrase Cuộc chiến với Covid-19 (War against COVID-19) to illustrate the efforts and sacrifices required to contain the pandemic. In the news programs or in major newspapers, the information published about the COVID-19 pandemic is mainly the updated number of cured cases, and usually does not mention the number of deaths per day. State media also focus on reporting on the directives of state agencies, censored the negative news and if there is mention of the impact of the epidemic, they mainly only exploit economic issues. Meanwhile, on the social network, information about the epidemic is not as positive as the way the state press portrays. Pictures and posts about overloaded hospitals, patients lying on the floor with ventilators or oxygen tanks, people calling for help because a relative has died are widely spread by people on social networks in Vietnam.

== Vaccine diplomacy ==
While vaccination efforts intensify around the world, Vietnam is one of very few middle-income countries in the process of making its own COVID-19 vaccine. Two Vietnamese vaccines have become the first vaccines to be developed in Southeast Asia to begin clinical trials.

As the majority of vaccine doses go to the United States and Europe, most drug companies are unwilling to share their technology and many countries can't afford to purchase the necessary doses. Like many governments, Vietnam is also wary of becoming over reliant on any single country for its vaccines. But Vietnam's vaccine development is more than ensure health security, this would also help the country to enhance its geopolitical status. The vaccines may allow the Vietnamese government to position itself as a leader among developing countries by supporting their access to the drugs and their recovery as a whole. While drug companies in the US and the UK are firmly attached to their patents and restrict production overseas, Hanoi would offer countries a cheap, reliable and politically neutral vaccine alternative.

== Financial relief ==
In 2020, until 29 May, the total value of donations had been given to social policy beneficiaries, national devotees and social protection beneficiaries were about 9.4 trillion VND. Besides, more than 24 million health insurance cards, free health care books/cards were donated to policy beneficiaries in the whole country. As of 15 September 2020, more than 12.5 trillion VND was disbursed nationwide to support people in difficulty due to the COVID-19 epidemic.

In both 2020 and the first 6 months of 2021, the state budget has spent 168,8 trillion VND ($7.34 billion USD) to supported businesses and people impacted by the COVID-19 outbreak and for disease prevention and control. The Vietnamese government has issued several incentives in the form of tax breaks, delayed tax payments, and land-use fees for businesses. Beneficiaries of this support include employees who have to postpone labour contracts, part-time workers who are unemployed but have not received unemployment benefits, enterprises have no revenue or no financial source to pay salaries, employers, individual business households and people with meritorious services to the nation. However, the disbursement of the support package still faces many difficulties and delays due to complicated procedures.

According to the United Nations, Vietnamese government has issued and is implementing a multi-sectoral response to address the social and economic impact of the crisis. The table below summarizes Government policy in support of affected people and enterprises in response to COVID-19.

COVID-19 financial support packages
Support policy	Budget (USD)	Description
Fiscal package to support enterprises	$7.8 billion	Tax deference and delayed payment of land use tax and rent for affected enterprises.
Loans with zero interest rate to pay workers salary	$10.2-43.1 million	Loans with zero interest rate for affected enterprises.
Social protection package	$2.7 billion	Cash transfer for 3 months (April, May and June 2020) for people with merit, poor and near poor households, affected workers and household businesses.
Electricity price reduction	$475 million	10% reduction of electricity price from April to June 2020; free for all households and businesses, health and quarantine facilities.
Banks reduce interest rates		Banks reduced interest rates and exempted or reduced fees for making transactions.
Credit package of Commercial banks	$12.3 billion	Loans for less/least affected enterprises but need investment capital after COVID-19. Heavily affected enterprises also can borrow if ability to repay can be proven.

According to MOLISA, by 29 June 2020, more than 11 million individuals from an approved list of 15.8 million vulnerable people and 6,196 household businesses had received more than 11 trillion VND ($477 million USD) in the social assistance package. However, MOLISA reports indicated some key challenges in implementing this package, including complicated procedures leading to late delivery of cash and limited local funds (30-50% of total local funds) among poor provinces, such as Bình Định, Hòa Bình, Nghệ An and Thanh Hóa. A rapid assessment in May 2020 conducted by the Department of Social Protection with all provinces on the COVID-19 social assistance package indicated that informal workers, small businesses and families with children faced difficulties accessing this package, due to complex registration and procedures. In the capital city Hanoi, to receive the financial aid of US$65, the government requested people to print the approval documents when the print shops are closed, and go to get confirmation documents back in their hometown while Hanoi is under lockdown and every vehicle cannot get out of the city.

== Cyberattacks ==
According to Reuters, APT32, a hacker group backed by Vietnamese government, also known as OceanLotus or Cobalt Kitty, has tried to compromise the personal and professional email accounts of staff at China's Ministry of Emergency Management and the local government of Wuhan, the epicenter of COVID-19 pandemic. This group has also been accused of compromising "governments, businesses and health agencies in search of information about the new disease and attempts to combat it."

However, Vietnam says reports that it has supported hacker group APT32 to steal information on COVID-19 from China are 'baseless'. "This is baseless information. Vietnam strictly forbids cyberattack behavior targeting organizations and individuals in any form", Foreign Affairs Ministry deputy spokesman Ngo Toan Thang said at an online press meet.

== Evacuation and repatriation ==
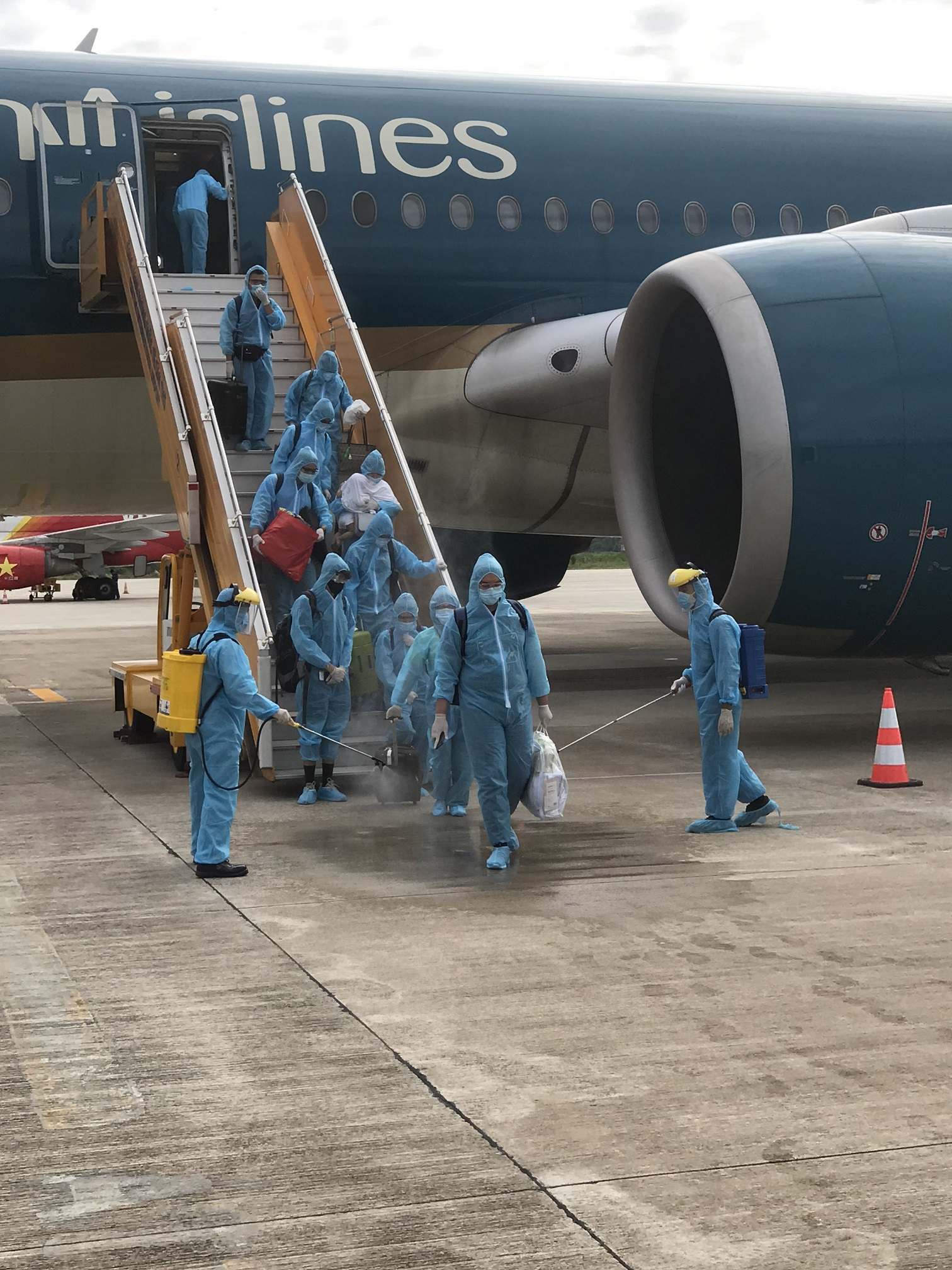
Disinfection upon landing of a Vietnam Airlines repatriation flight

As of January 2022, more than 200,000 Vietnamese people have been flown back to the country on 800 repatriation flights from 60 countries and territories around the world. On 13 July, Prime Minister Nguyễn Xuân Phúc allowed the resumption of commercial flights to and from China after five months of shutdown of international flights to control COVID-19. These flights are reported to cost several times more expensive than conventional commercial flights since embassy officials frequently collect illegitimate fees for their own personal gain. There are also discrepancies among individuals chosen to return, with those who have the relationships with embassy personnel often being picked over those who do not.

On 28 July, Vietnam Airlines repatriation flight VN05 departed from Hanoi to Equatorial Guinea to bring 219 Vietnamese workers back to Vietnam. According to the airline statement, the Airbus A350 will fly directly from Noi Bai International Airport to the city of Bata for more than 12 hours, then stop picking up passengers and refueling for 3 hours, then return to Vietnam. The aircraft is expected to land at Hanoi at 11:20 on 29 July. Of the 219 returning workers, 129 were infected with COVID-19. On the plane, there are 2 doctors and 2 nurses of the Hanoi National Hospital of Tropical Diseases to promptly provide emergency and support to the patients. Health authorities also arrange a variety of medical equipment to support passengers. Medical stretchers are mounted on aircraft, providing emergency aid for serious patients.

== Reception ==
=== 2020 ===
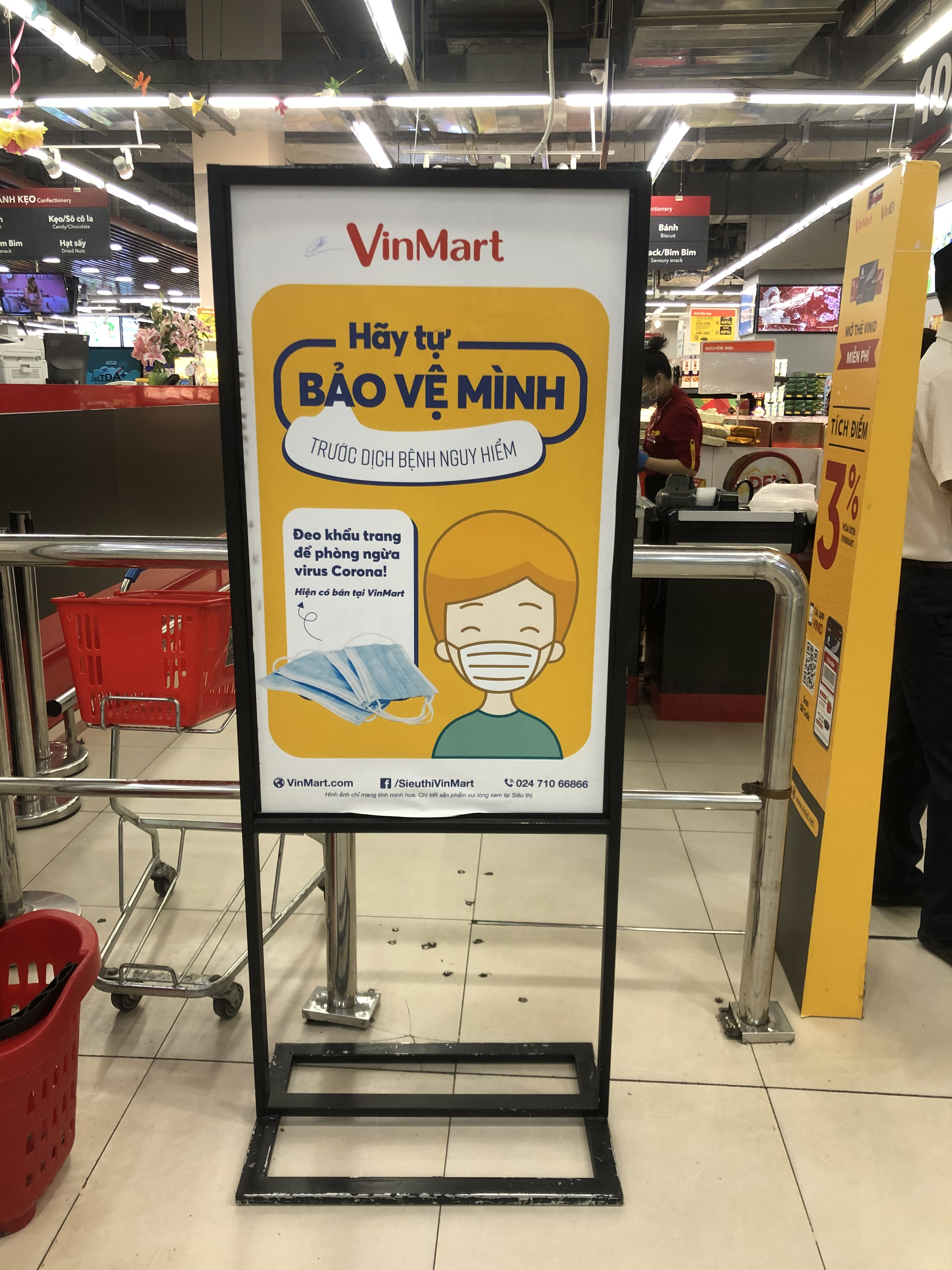
On 16 March 2020, the Vietnamese government required everyone to wear masks when going to public areas to protect themselves and others.

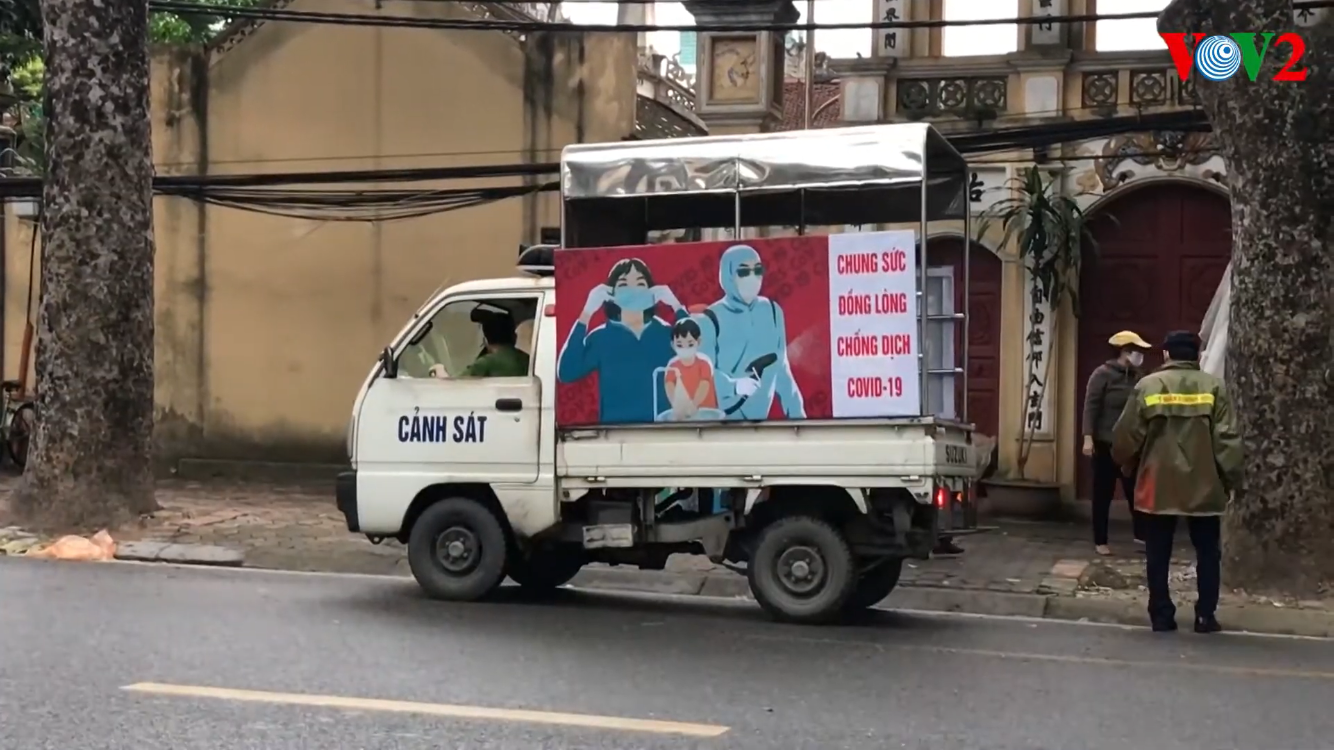
A police car with propaganda banner about fighting COVID-19 in Hanoi.

In comparison to other commended examples like South Korea, Singapore and Taiwan, Vietnam had experienced a much lower number of cases, and no fatalities for six consecutive months — an achievement recalling the success in 2003 when Vietnam became the first country to be cleared of the SARS outbreak. Even after dozens of deaths recorded during the second wave, the toll in Vietnam against its population, peaking at the rate of 0.4 deaths per million people, remains lower than most of the world. Researcher Martha Lincoln, the San Francisco State medical anthropologist, who has worked in Vietnam extensively, describes Vietnam's public health response as "impeccable and relentless".

Vietnam responded to the pandemic "early and proactively", as complimented by World Health Organization representative Kidong Park, with risk assessment conducted just after first reported cases in China in January. The country is accredited by Professor Mike Toole from the Burnet Institute with acting "probably faster than any country in the world outside China". Toole points out that Vietnam had already developed three COVID-19 test kits by early March, the time when the U.S. had not even acquired an effective one. The Guardian praised Vietnam's propaganda posters reflecting the wartime spirit and Vietnamese nationalism, along with early isolation and tracing objects in contact with the sick helped Vietnam avoid the disaster that Europe is suffering.

Another the reasons Vietnam was able to act so quickly and keep the case count so low is that the country experienced a severe acute respiratory syndrome (SARS) epidemic in 2003 and human cases of avian influenza between 2004 and 2010. As a result, Vietnam had both the experience and infrastructure to take appropriate action. Vietnam makes many key containment decisions in a matter of days, which may take weeks for governments in other countries to make. Although Vietnam is a highly centralized country, a number of key decisions were made at the local level, which also contributed to the swift response.

Beyond the political factors, social solidarity and unity also played a substantial role. These sentiments imply an attitude of self-sacrifice on behalf of the broader community, a value that may be explained in part through Vietnam's socialist history and decades-long struggle for sovereignty. It is important, however, not to allow this grander narrative to minimize the practical individual motivation to keep family, friends, and neighbors safe through social distancing and other measures. Reports from the media indicate that, in time of severe crisis, people may be willing and prepared to accept more restrictive actions to save lives. As willingness to embrace social distancing was credited with helping mitigate the spread of COVID-19 in Vietnam, examinations of the underlying motivation should acknowledge nationalism and solidarity as important but not sole determinants of effectiveness.

Analysts indicate transparency as the key difference between pandemic management in Vietnam and in the neighboring China, despite their similar communist institutions. Most international experts present in Vietnam refute skepticism and accord high credibility to statistics provided by the Ministry of Health. According to Professor Guy Thwaites, the Oxford University Clinical Research Unit in Ho Chi Minh City had conducted 20,000 separate tests, of which the results matched those publicized by the government. An investigation by Reuters correspondents in April on 13 funeral organizers in Hanoi found no abnormal upsurge in the number of deaths, if not even a slight decrease due to reduction of traffic accidents during the lockdown. Huong Le Thu, analyst at the Australian Strategic Policy Institute, cites reports of deaths during the second wave as a further demonstration that the zero fatality rate in the previous phase "should have not been questioned in the first place". Trien Vinh Le and Huy Quynh Nguyen from the University of Economics Ho Chi Minh City highlight the difference from the censorship policy in China:

As a country with political institutions quite similar to China, Vietnam has long been considered to be a lot more open than China in terms of media censorship and information control. People in Vietnam, for example, can use most of the world's social networks. Facebook is especially widely used and serves as a giant platform for people sharing information as well as expressing criticism, directly or indirectly, of government policies. While China's media was slow to reveal its vulnerabilities and information about the mysterious pneumonia in Wuhan, doubts about the disease statistics from China in the early stages were laid bare to the Vietnamese internet community, enabling a stronger sense of prevention. Anecdotally, some scholars were seriously criticized when they proposed that face masks were unnecessary and coronavirus was not as dangerous as seasonal influenza in the United States.

=== 2021 ===
The fourth wave of infections came amidst the increasing prevalence of the Delta variant, coupled with low vaccination rates, and waning public opinion of Vietnam's performance in pandemic prevention. In the 15 months since the epidemic began in January 2020, the country had only registered less than 3,000 cases and 35 deaths, in total. However, by July and August 2021, the daily number of new cases had risen to approximately 10,000, with thousands of deaths. Pham Minh Duc, a senior research officer at the Burnet Institute said: "The current outbreak has crippled [Vietnam's] preventive healthcare system and placed the country's health care under extreme stress." The ratio between confirmed deaths and confirmed cases in Ho Chi Minh City, Vietnam's largest city, reached 4.5%, exceeding Indonesia's 3.7% and Thailand's 1%, placing further stress on the healthcare system, which was already overburdened and thus unable to handle an influx of COVID-19 patients.

One of the main factors that contributed to the outbreak is the Delta variant. This particular strain is more transmissible than previous ones but the government was still using outdated policies and practices. After the old methods - which had been very successful before - proved ineffective and the number of confirmed cases kept increasing, the government was caught unprepared and decreed inconsistent safety measures, and thus, the government is left with the harsher option of controlling information to keep its public image. With trust in the central government reduced, each locality applies its own anti-epidemic methods that they consider effective while people became fatigued with lockdown protocols. As a result, the outbreak became more severe, straining health care capacity.

Another reason is Vietnam's slow vaccine rollout. After the initial success in suppressing the pandemic in 2020, the authorities displayed complacency and failed to take the opportunity to purchase vaccine doses and implement an immunization program while the number of cases were still low. As the Delta variant rampaged in India, the country's communist party was still undergoing a leadership transition. The 13th Party Congress ended in early February 2021, but cabinet positions were not filled until May and June, so as to allow the National Assembly to conduct its vote. This power change diverted the government's attention away from the vaccine procurement campaign and disrupted anti-epidemic activities. The weaker response to the pandemic than the previous government because of an overemphasis on growth has had a negative impact on Vietnam's worldwide reputation, as well as on local trust in the administration, signaling a rocky start for Phạm Minh Chính's new government.

==== Shortage of medical staff ====
In the first ten months of 2021, 968 health employees resigned, up from 597 last year. Workplace stress, insufficient income to support living expenses, and a lack of opportunities to enhance skills are the main causes. In some areas of Ho Chi Minh City, 11 health staff are in charge of the health of 140,000 people. This means that each health practitioner is responsible for roughly 13,000 people so they have to work at full capacity to handle their duties. These include the prevention of infectious diseases, immunization and health care for children, management of pregnant women, family planning, management of the mentally ill, etc. When the COVID-19 pandemic broke out, medical staff had to work 2-3 times more than usual, but their income remained the same. The proportion of medical staff in Ho Chi Minh City is the lowest in Vietnam, only about 2.31 per 10,000 people, lower than the national average of 7. Director of the Ho Chi Minh City Department of Health Tang Chi Thuong said: "Medical staff are exhausted, it has been almost eight months that they have not had a day off while the income is too low, this is the reason why many medical workers quit their job". Realizing this, the Ministry of Health has an income support policy to retain medical staff. Specifically, doctors working at health stations receive a subsidy of more than 6 million VND (~ US$300), while nurses receive more than 4 million VND (~ US$200) but this number is still low compared to the standard of living.

In the country, the minimum fixed staffing for one health station is 5 and the maximum is 10. However, the actual population in each ward is different, for example, in Ward 5, District 3, there are about 20,000 people when in Binh Tan district, a ward can have up to 120,000-140,000 people, but each station can still only have a maximum of 10 medical staff. This is an inadequacy that has existed for many years in Vietnam. According to the director of Ho Chi Minh City's health department, in the long run, the government should have a mechanism to adjust and allocate health stations according to population, which means there is one health station for every 10,000 people. Currently, the city's Department of Health has proposed to the government to increase the minimum staffing at medical station from 5 to 10 medical staff. In addition to doctors, medical stations also need more aides, security guards, and community health experts. After calculating, the city's medical stations are in short of 4,126 people.

=== Criticism ===
==== Human rights ====
Vietnam also received criticism for its response from anti-communist overseas Vietnamese, who accused the government of not being pro-active enough and censorship. Some critics of the government have been arrested for allegedly spreading false information and political criticism about the government actions on coronavirus pandemic. From January to March 2020, police censored around 300,000 posts on news sites and blogs and 600,000 posts on social media about COVID-19. During those two months, police took action against 654 cases of distributing fake news and sanctioned 146 people. UN High Commissioner for Human Rights Michelle Bachelet criticized that Vietnam using laws governing alleged fake news in other contexts to "deter legitimate speech, especially public debate, criticism of government policy and suppress freedom of expression". She also said: "Arrests for expressing discontent or allegedly spreading false information through the press and social media, have been reported".

In some cases, the authorities acted too rigidly and "immoral" in conducting the quarantine rules. For example, in Bắc Giang Province, a woman tested positive for COVID-19, and the authorities decided to take her to the hospital for treatment while leaving her 3-day-old child alone in an isolation camp.

==== Personal information ====
The Government has avoided officially publishing unnecessary personal information relating to individuals who are infected or potentially infected with COVID-19. However, in some cases, individuals diagnosed as having COVID-19 or those in quarantine, were reported to have personal and inaccurate data publicised unofficially on social media sites, including photos and personal ID information. Such problems deeply impacted the mental health of the affected individuals, including family members, even when they tested negative. Such situations also risk dissuading persons who may be infected from seeking medical treatment or declaring themselves to health authorities in order to avoid stigma, which in turn would hinder efforts to contain the pandemic.

==== Viet A corruption scandal ====
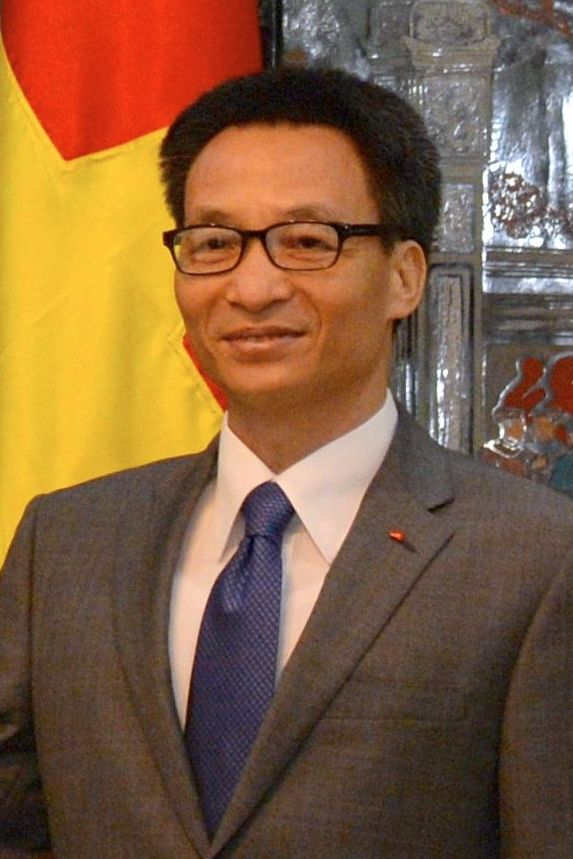
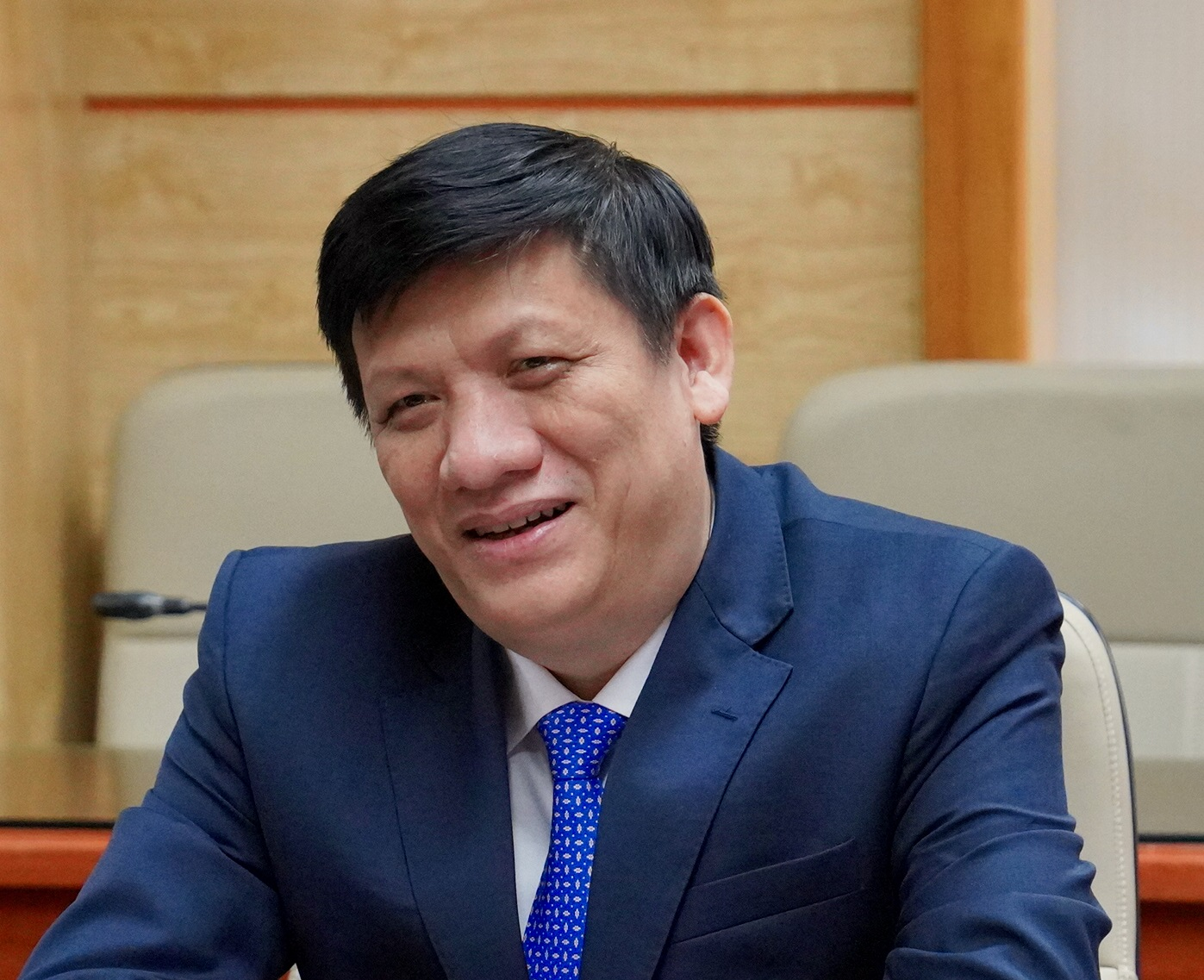
From top to bottom: Deputy prime minister Vũ Đức Đam, head of Vietnam National Steering Committee on COVID-19 Prevention and Control and Dr. Nguyễn Thanh Long, Vietnam's Minister of Health during the onset of the pandemic. Both officials would be implicated in the Viet A scandal.

In June 2022, the Viet A Technologies Company came under investigation after it was found that the company bribed officials into buying its "vastly overpriced" COVID-19 test kits. The Ministry of Public Security announced that up to 800 billion VND (34.5 million USD) in bribes were paid by Viet A, according to the company director Phan Quốc Việt. Several high-ranking officials connected to the scandal were also expelled from their posts and from the Communist Party of Vietnam, including Minister of Health Nguyễn Thanh Long and Hanoi mayor Chu Ngọc Anh.

=== Public opinion survey ===
The level of confidence in the Vietnamese government's ability to fight the epidemic has also decreased after applying the social distancing policy. According to a survey by Singapore's Yusof Ishak Institute, the level of trust in the Vietnamese government dropped to 83% in 2021, down 14% compared to 2020, although this rate is still higher than other countries in the region.
