= Ministry of Health (Vietnam) =

Government ministry of Vietnam

Socialist Republic of Vietnam Ministry of Health
- Bộ Y tế
- Logo

Ministry overview
- Formed: 28 August 1945
- Preceding Ministry: Ministry of Health (1945-1946) Ministry of Social Affairs, Health, Humanitarian Support and Labour (1946) Ministry of Health (1946-)
- Type: Government Ministry
- Jurisdiction: Government of Vietnam
- Annual budget: 13.654 billions VND (2018)
- Minister responsible: Đào Hồng Lan
- Deputy Minister responsible: Vũ Mạnh Hà Đỗ Xuân Tuyên Nguyễn Thị Liên Hương Lê Đức Luận
- Website: moh.gov.vn

The Ministry of Health (MOH, Vietnamese: Bộ Y tế) is the government ministry responsible for the governance and guidance of the health, healthcare and health industry of Vietnam. In conjunction with other ministries and the prime minister's office, it is responsible for creating and promulgating long-term health policy programs such as the "National Strategy on Nutrition for the 2001 - 2010 period" and the "National Policy on Injury Prevention 2002 - 2010". The Department of Medical Equipment and Works is a unit of the ministry.

== History ==
The Ministry of Health was one of the first 13 Ministries of the Provisional Revolutionary Government of the Democratic Republic of Vietnam, established on August 28, 1945 and introduced to the people for the first time on September 2, 1945. The first minister was doctor Phạm Ngọc Thạch.

On March 2, 1946, the Government of the Resistance Coalition merged the Ministry of Health, the Ministry of Labor and the Ministry of Social Relief into the Ministry of Social Affairs, Health, Relief and Labor, with Minister Trương Đình Tri. On November 3, 1946, a separate Ministry of Health was created as before in the National Coalition Government, with Minister Hoàng Tích Trí.

In November 2019, Deputy Prime Minister Vũ Đức Đam took charge of the ministry after Minister Nguyễn Thị Kim Tiến reached the retirement age. On 7 July 2020, amidst the COVID-19 pandemic, Nguyễn Thanh Long, who is a professor specialized in infectious diseases, was temporarily appointed to the position, acting as the Minister of Health. On 12 November 2020, he officially became the Minister of Health. He held the post until June 7th 2022, when he was relieved of duty by the National Assembly following corruption allegations regarding the Việt Á COVID-19 test kit scandal.

On July 15, 2022, Đào Hồng Lan took office as Minister of Health, replacing Nguyễn Thanh Long, after the discovery of scandals related to the Vietnam Technology Corporation (Viet A) case.
