= Nguyễn Thanh Long =

Vietnamese politician and doctor

Professor Nguyễn Thanh Long
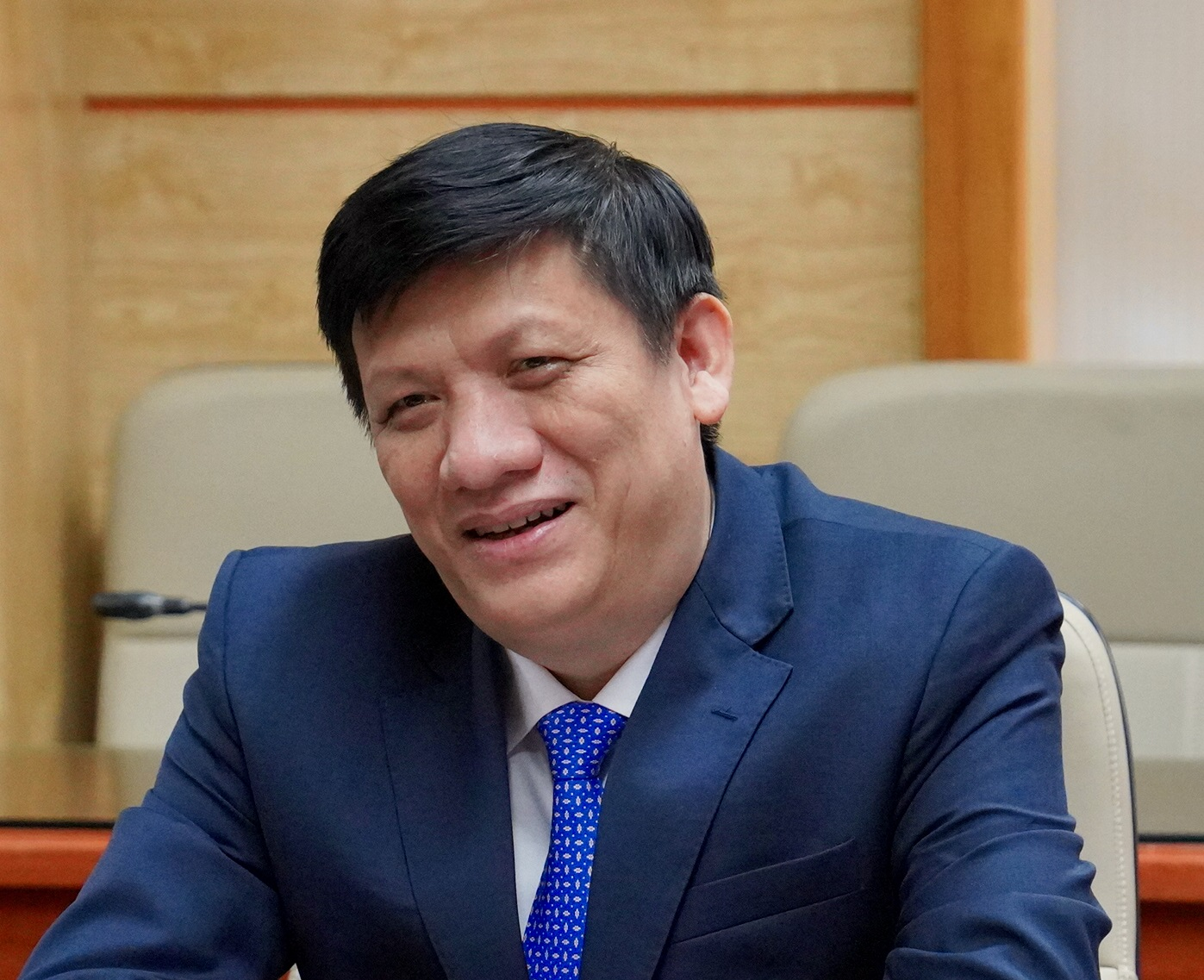

Minister of Health
- In office 7 July 2020 – 6 June 2022 (Note: His term as Minister of Health effectively ended on 6 June 2022 after his removal from the Communist Party of Vietnam as only members of the party are in the government in one-party state Vietnam.); Acting: 7 July 2020 – 12 November 2020
- Prime Minister: Nguyễn Xuân Phúc; Phạm Minh Chính
- Preceded by: Vũ Đức Đam (acting)
- Succeeded by: Đào Hồng Lan

Deputy Minister of Health
- In office 31 January 2020 – 7 July 2020
- Prime Minister: Nguyễn Xuân Phúc
- Minister: Vũ Đức Đam (acting)
- In office 2011–2018
- Prime Minister: Nguyễn Tấn Dũng; Nguyễn Xuân Phúc

Deputy Director of Central Propaganda Department
- In office October 2018 – 31 January 2020

Personal details
- Born: September 3, 1966 (age 60) Giao Thủy district, Nam Định Province, North Vietnam
- Party: Communist Party of Vietnam (–2022)
- Education: Hanoi Medical University
- Criminal information
- Status: In prison
- Conviction: Corruption
- Trial: Việt Á scandal (3 January 2024 – 12 January 2024)
- Penalty: 17 years imprisonment (reduced from 18 years after appeal); ₫1,000,000,000 (US$41,600)

Details
- Date apprehended: 2022

Nguyễn Thanh Long (born September 3, 1966) is a former Vietnamese politician and medical doctor who served as Minister of Health from July 2020 until his removal from the Communist Party of Vietnam in June 2022 for involvement in the Việt Á corruption scandal. During his term as Minister of Health, he was in acting capacity from July to November 2020. He has been noted for being one of the chief strategists of the response of the Vietnamese government to the COVID-19 pandemic. In January 2024, he was sentenced to 18 years in prison for taking bribes worth USD 2.25 million and expelled from Vietnam's Communist Party.

== Early life and education ==
Long was born on September 3, 1966, in Bạch Long commune, Giao Thủy District, Nam Định Province, Vietnam.

== Career ==
Long graduated in Infectious Medicine from Hanoi Medical University in 1995 and received his doctor’s degree in 2003. He received the title of Professor in 2013. Between 2005 and 2011, he oversaw HIV/AIDS prevention at the Ministry of Health and from 2011 to 2018 he served as Deputy Minister of Health, before being appointed Deputy Director of the Central Propaganda Department. At the start of the COVID-19 pandemic, he returned as Deputy Minister of Health and from July 2020 to June 2022 as acting Minister of Health. He has been credited as one of the strategists behind Vietnam's widely praised success during 2020 in responding to and controlling the COVID-19 pandemic. On 12 November 2020, he officially became the Minister of Health.

== Relief of duty and expulsion from Communist Party ==
On 6 June 2022, the Politburo of the Communist Party of Vietnam summoned an extraordinary meeting of the 13th Central Committee at the Party's HQ, review and enforce disciplinary actions against Nguyễn Thanh Long and the chairman of the Hanoi People's Committee Chu Ngọc Anh. After reviewing the Politburo's request, based on the content, the basis of the situation, the level of consequences and the caused of violation; according to the Party's rules on disciplining violated Party members, the Central Committee decided expulsion from the Party for both Long and Anh.

In the morning of 7 June 2022, with a majority in favor, the National Assembly approved the stripping of Long's status as a member of the 15th National Assembly and approved the recommendation of his removal as the Minister of Health. President Nguyễn Xuân Phúc issued Executive Decision No.658/QĐ-CTN regarding Long's relief of duty as the Minister of Health, agreeing on the Prime Minister's recommendation, effective that day.

The Politburo's official statement stated that: ″Comrade Nguyễn Thanh Long has severely deteriorated his political ideology and morality; has violated the law and the Party's rules; has violated the Party member's Code of Conduct, leading to the loss and waste of State Budget; severely affected the State's response to the COVID-19 pandemic; causing public outcry and affected the credibility of the Party and the Ministry of Health″.

== Prosecution, arrest and conviction ==
On 7 June 2022, the Investigative Department of the Ministry of Public Security announced an extended investigation into the Viet A COVID-19 test kit scandal, which saw multiple high ranking officials arrested on the charges of: "Violating regulations of the law on bidding which leads to serious consequences", "Abuse of power or position in performance of official duties", "Giving Bribes" and "Receiving Bribes".

Later that evening, alongside former chairman of the Hanoi People's Committee Chu Ngọc Anh and former Deputy Minister of Science and Technology Phạm Công Tạc, Nguyễn Thanh Long was issued a Prosecution Decision, an arrest warrant and a search warrant by the Ministry of Public Security on the charges of "abuse of power or position in performance of official duties". He was taken into custody after a 3-hour long search at his private residence.

On 12 January 2024, he was sentenced to 18 years in prison for taking bribes worth USD 2.25 million. He was convicted of colluding with a private medical firm, namely Viet A Technology Corp to sell the COVID-19 test kits at inflated prices. He was also quoted by Phap Luat Online Newspaper as having apologised during the trial. Long’s sentence was reduced to 17 years following an appeal in May 2024, after he paid ₫1,000,000,000 (US$41,600) towards mitigating the impact of the case.

== See also ==
- Corruption in Vietnam
- Việt Á scandal
