= Corruption in Vietnam =

Corruption in Vietnam is pervasive and widespread, due to weak legal infrastructure, financial unpredictability, and conflicting and negative bureaucratic decision-making. Surveys from 2015 revealed that while petty corruption decreased slightly throughout the country, high-level corruption significantly increased as a means of abuse of political power in Vietnam. Corruption is a very significant problem in Vietnam, impacting all aspects of administration, education and law enforcement.

Vietnam is a one-party state under the Communist Party of Vietnam (CPV). In 2015, the party stated that corruption had moved up the political agenda, and the legal framework for tackling corruption had become "better developed". A major anti-corruption campaign began the next year, and by 2024, more than 2,700 party organisations and 168,000 party members were punished, including 33 current or former Central Committee members and 50 high-ranking military officers.

As of January 2018 Vietnam scored one of the highest rates of bribery practices – the percentage of citizens that have paid a bribe to key public institutions over the past 12 months. Vietnam's rate is 65%, second only to India with 69%. In effect, as of 2012, corruption has been considered an obstacle for doing business in Vietnam, and the use of facilitation payments have been widespread when dealing with frontline civil servants at all levels of society.

== Pervasiveness ==
Transparency International's 2024 Corruption Perceptions Index, which scored 182 countries on a scale from 0 ("highly corrupt") to 100 ("very clean"), gave Vietnam a score of 41. When ranked by score, Vietnam ranked 81st among the 182 countries in the Index, where the country ranked first is perceived to have the most honest public sector. For comparison with regional scores, the best score among those countries of the Asia Pacific region that appeared in the Index (Note: Afghanistan, Australia, Bangladesh, Bhutan, Brunei Darussalam, Cambodia, China, Fiji, Hong Kong, India, Indonesia, Japan, North Korea, South Korea, Laos, Malaysia, Maldives, Mongolia, Myanmar, Nepal, New Zealand, Pakistan, Papua New Guinea, Philippines, Singapore, Solomon Islands, Sri Lanka, Taiwan, Thailand, Timor-Leste, Vanuatu, and Vietnam) was 84, the average score was 45 and the worst score was 15. For comparison with worldwide scores, the best score was 89 (ranked 1), the average score was 42, and the worst score was 9 (ranked 181, in a two-way tie).

Surveys from 2015 revealed that while petty corruption decreased slightly throughout the country, high-level corruption or systemic and political corruption significantly increased as a means of abuse of political power in Vietnam. As of January 2018, Vietnam scored one of the highest rates of bribery practices – the rate citizens have paid a bribe to key public institutions over the past 12 months, at 65%, is second only to Corruption in India with 69%.

== Effects ==
Vietnam is a developing country of about 96 million people as of 2018. As of 2012, corruption was considered an obstacle for doing business in Vietnam, and the use of facilitation payments have been widespread when dealing with frontline civil servants at all levels of society.

Due to the international view of corruption in Vietnam, in 2020, foreign direct investment (FDI) in Vietnam stood at only US$28.5 billion, far below its ASEAN neighbours.

== Government anti-corruption efforts ==
In 2016, the ongoing "blazing furnace" (đốt lò) anti-corruption campaign was started by Nguyễn Phú Trọng, general secretary of the Communist Party of Vietnam. The anti-corruption campaign began with the arrest of dozens of health officials, including generals.

In 2021, the Vietnamese government stated that it had taken stronger efforts to combat corruption.

A major anti-corruption case in the campaign occurred in the middle of 2022, when the Communist Party expelled Health Minister Nguyễn Thanh Long and deputy science minister Pham Cong Tac and prosecuted them for overpricing the sale of COVID-19 testing kits to hospitals.

In the first eight years of the campaign, more than 2,700 party organisations and 168,000 party members were punished. Among them were 33 current or former Central Committee members, and 50 high-ranking military officers.

=== Officials implicated by the anti-corruption campaigns ===
- Đinh La Thăng: former Minister of Transport, former Communist Party Secretary of Ho Chi Minh City, and former member of the Politburo of the Communist Party of Vietnam.
- Nguyễn Đức Chung: former Major General of the Vietnam People's Public Security and Vietnamese politician. He is a former Chairman of the Hanoi People's Committee.
- Nguyễn Thanh Long: Minister of Health from July 2020 until his removal from the Communist Party of Vietnam in June 2022 for involvement in the Việt Á scandal.
- Trịnh Xuân Thanh: Former Vietnamese politician and businessman. He is the former head of the state-owned Petrovietnam Construction Joint Stock Corporation (a subsidiary of Petrovietnam) and the former Deputy-Chairman of the Provincial People's Committee of Hậu Giang.
- Nguyễn Xuân Phúc: Former President of Vietnam implicated in the Việt Á scandal, resigned on January 23, 2023
- Dương Bá Thanh Dân: Director of the Department of Medical Supplies at the Center for Disease Control and Prevention, or CDC, in the Southeastern Province of Ninh Thuan, and his employee Nguyễn Đăng Đức.
- Đào Hữu Long: Director of Thua Thien Hue Provincial Registration Center.
- Tô Anh Dũng: Former Vice Minister of Foreign Affairs, (and seven other former officials at the foreign ministry) due to allegedly receiving bribes up to $908,000 to add companies to a list of providers of repatriation flights during COVID 19 epidemic.

== See also ==
- PMU 18 scandal, 2006, 1.8 million US$
- Trương Mỹ Lan, 2018–2022 arrest, 12.5 billion US$
- Crime in Vietnam
