= Việt Á scandal =

Corruption scandal in Vietnam

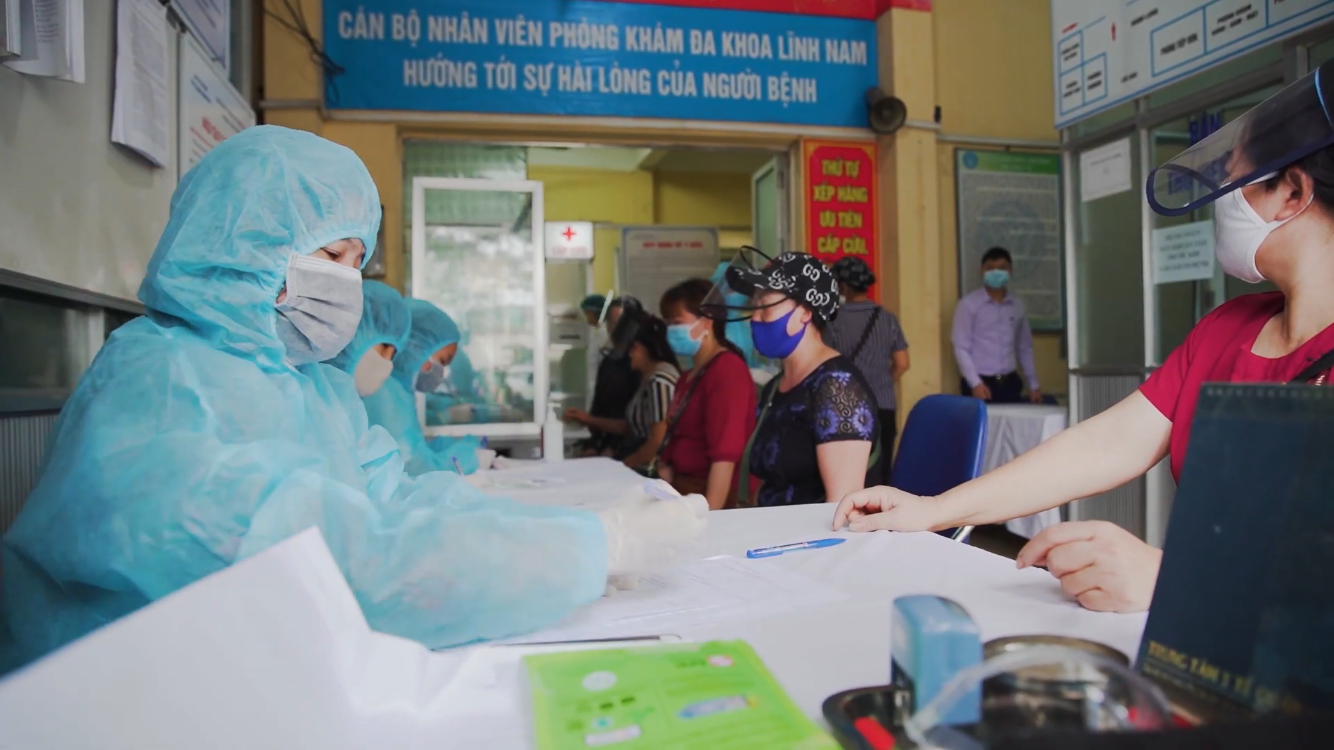
Vietnam's COVID-19 testing system would develop into a corruption scandal in late 2021.

The Việt Á scandal was a bribery and corruption scandal that arose during the COVID-19 pandemic in Vietnam. In 2020 and 2021, Việt Á Technology Corporation bribed Vietnamese government officials to sell COVID-19 RT-PCR tests, at heavily inflated prices to provincial health departments and hospitals.

The scandal broke in late 2021, leading to a number of prominent officials being dismissed, including Nguyễn Thanh Long, health minister for most of the pandemic, and reduced public trust in the government. The scandal led to a wider crackdown on corruption in Vietnam, contributed to the removal of deputy prime ministers Phạm Bình Minh and Vũ Đức Đam, and to the resignation of president Nguyễn Xuân Phúc in 2023.

== Background ==
Việt Á Technology Corporation (Vietnamese: Công ty Cổ phần Công nghệ Việt Á, lit. 'Vietnam-Asia Technology Joint Stock Company') was considered one of the most prominent companies in the Vietnamese medical technology sector and a major supplier of chemicals and machines for the country's hospitals. In February 2020, the company collaborated with the Vietnam Military Medical University to develop a domestically manufactured COVID-19 RT-PCR test that was released one month later; its quick deployment has been cited as a factor in the early success of Vietnam's zero-COVID policy, with ten other countries considering buying Việt Á tests and the company receiving an official award. However, the high amount spent on mass testing, four times the expenses incurred by Vietnam to supply COVID-19 vaccines, had resulted in some suspecting collusion between the government and private companies for the latter's gain.

Corruption is considered a major issue in Vietnam; General Secretary of the Communist Party of Vietnam Nguyễn Phú Trọng, who had himself came to power during a series of major controversies about graft in the government, introduced the "burning furnace" campaign (Vietnamese: chiến dịch đốt lò; so named to indicate the pressure placed on those accused of corruption) in 2016 to eradicate corruption in the Party. With nearly 1,400 officials being investigated by the government through this campaign according to official figures, this has been described as the farthest-reaching anti-corruption effort by the CPV; on the other hand, some commentators have accused Trọng of merely targeting political opponents (such as politicians who were allied with former prime minister Nguyễn Tấn Dũng), and there has been criticism of the campaign for failing to significantly reduce corruption.

== Scandal ==
The first controversy occurred in April 2020, when the Ministry of Science and Technology claimed that the test had been accepted by the World Health Organization (WHO) for emergency use, despite this not being the case. Although social media users suspected it was a false claim to increase sales and public trust, it took months for the press and the WHO to refute these claims, which led to additional criticism for the slow response. It was later found that the RT-PCR tests were marked up by 45% and sold at a price of US$20. Furthermore, between September and December 2021, Việt Á imported rapid test kits from China at the price of US$0.955 (₫21,600), falsely marketed them as being made in Vietnam, and sold them to local officials for US$20.75 (₫470,000), 21.7 times the original price. To facilitate these markups, the company admitted to having bribed local officials over US$35 million in total to buy the test kits, earning a revenue surpassing $US177 million with an illegitimate profit of $22 million.

== Response ==
After these events were made public in December 2021, the Vietnamese government launched an investigation, arresting key Việt Á executives and leaders as well as looking at the roles of provincial health officials. By June 2022, dozens of politicians were arrested and charged, including health minister Nguyễn Thanh Long and Hanoi mayor Chu Ngọc Anh, who were also stripped of their Communist Party membership and thus dismissed from office. The scandal reportedly undermined public trust in the government and its COVID-19 policies; some commentators also saw the response as scapegoating and a band-aid solution to structural problems.

The scandal led to a broader drive against corruption in Vietnam. In January 2023, deputy prime ministers Phạm Bình Minh and Vũ Đức Đam were both removed from their positions by the National Assembly. President Nguyễn Xuân Phúc also resigned the same month, accepting responsibility for the actions of his subordinates during the pandemic response.

== See also ==
- Political impact of the COVID-19 pandemic
- Corruption in Vietnam
- Crime in Vietnam
