= Vũ Đức Đam =

Vietnamese politician

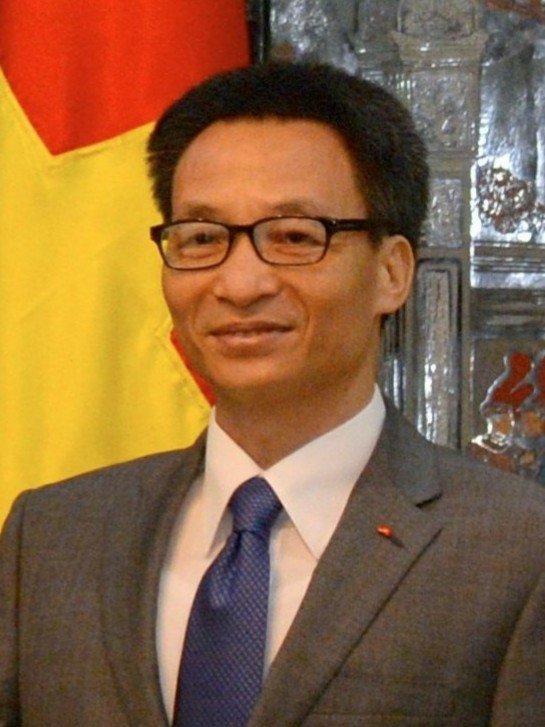
- Đam in 2015

Deputy Prime Minister of Vietnam
- In office 13 November 2013 – 5 January 2023
- Prime Minister: Nguyễn Tấn Dũng; Nguyễn Xuân Phúc; Phạm Minh Chính
- Preceded by: Nguyễn Thiện Nhân
- Succeeded by: Trần Hồng Hà

Minister of Health Acting
- In office 5 November 2019 – 7 July 2020
- Preceded by: Nguyễn Thị Kim Tiến
- Succeeded by: Nguyễn Thanh Long

Minister, Chairman of Government Office
- In office 3 August 2011 – 14 November 2013
- Prime Minister: Nguyễn Tấn Dũng
- Preceded by: Nguyễn Xuân Phúc
- Succeeded by: Nguyễn Văn Nên

Party Secretary of Quang Ninh
- In office 17 March 2010 – 15 August 2011
- Preceded by: Nguyễn Duy Hưng
- Succeeded by: Phạm Minh Chính

Chairman of People's Committee of Quang Ninh province
- In office 5 May 2008 – 6 August 2010
- Preceded by: Vũ Nguyên Nhiệm
- Succeeded by: Nguyễn Văn Đọc

Personal details
- Born: 3 February 1963 (age 63) Thanh Miện district, Hải Dương Province, North Vietnam (now Vietnam)
- Party: Communist Party of Vietnam
- Education: Vietnam National Academy of Public Administration

Vũ Đức Đam (born 3 February 1963) is a Vietnamese politician who served as one of the Deputy Prime Ministers of Vietnam from 2013 until his sacking in 2023. A long-time assistant to the economic reformer Võ Văn Kiệt, Đam previously served as Chairman of the People's Committee (Governor) of Quảng Ninh province and as Minister of the Government Office prior to being appointed deputy prime minister, where he was in charge of the Science and Technology, Information and Communication, Tourism and Sports portfolio. He was also the Chairman of the National Committee for AIDS and the Prevention of Drug Addiction and Prostitution.

Born in Hải Dương Province, he was educated at the Vietnam National Academy of Public Administration. Đam was considered to be one of the promising members of the Vietnamese government.

On 30 December 2022, he was voted out of the 13th Central Committee of the Communist Party of Vietnam. Đam stepped down from his position as deputy prime minister on 5 January 2023 after the National Assembly selected a successor. His dismissal came after the November 2022 arrest of Nguyễn Văn Trịnh, who was then Đam's ministerial assistant, for his role in the Việt Á scandal involving overpricing and bribery of COVID-19 test kit worth $172 million.

== Professional career ==
October 1988 – October 1990: an engineer of the Post Technical Trading and Service Company under the General Department of Post;

October 1990 – February 1992: a staff of the Department for Technical Development and Foreign Relations under the Viet Nam Post and Telecommunications Group

March 1992 – April 1993: a staff of the Office of the General Department of Post;

April 1993 – October 1994: Deputy Director of the Department on Science-Technology and International Cooperation under the General Department of Post;

October 1994 – November 1995: Deputy Director of the Department on International Relations, the Office of the Government;

November 1995 – August 1996: Acting Director, then Director of the ASEAN Department, the Office of the Government;

August 1996 – March 2003: Secretary, then assistant to former Prime Minister Vo Van Kiet;

March 2003 – August 2005: Vice Chairman, Permanent Vice Chairman of the Bac Ninh Provincial People’s Committee;

August 2005 – November 2007: Deputy Minister of Post-Telecommunication;

November 2007 – May 2008: Permanent Vice Chairman of the Quang Ninh Provincial People’s Committee;

5 May 2008 – 6 August 2010: Chairman of the Quang Ninh Provincial People’s Committee;

August 2010 – August 2011: Secretary of the Quang Ninh Provincial Party Committee;

August 2011 – November 2013: Minister of the Office of the Government;

13 November 2013 – 5 January 2023: Deputy Prime Minister of the Socialist Republic of Vietnam.

== Education ==
He graduated from Vietnam National Academy of Public Administration in 1994. He never studied abroad.
