= Nguyễn Xuân Phúc =

President of Vietnam from 2021 to 2023

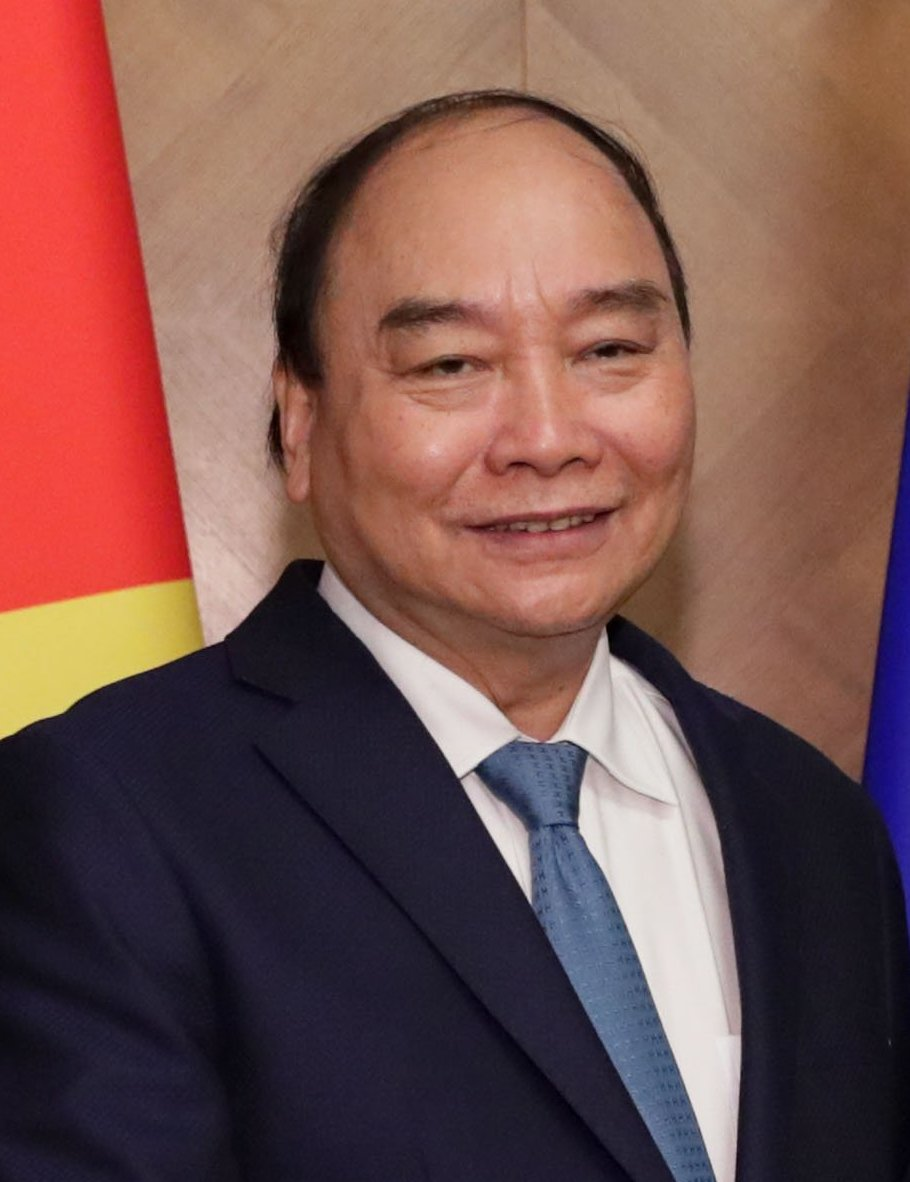
- Phúc in 2021

11th President of Vietnam
- In office 5 April 2021 – 18 January 2023
- Prime Minister: Phạm Minh Chính
- Vice President: Võ Thị Ánh Xuân
- Preceded by: Nguyễn Phú Trọng
- Succeeded by: Võ Văn Thưởng

7th Prime Minister of Vietnam
- In office 7 April 2016 – 5 April 2021
- President: Trần Đại Quang; Đặng Thị Ngọc Thịnh (acting); Nguyễn Phú Trọng
- Deputy: Trương Hòa Bình
- Preceded by: Nguyễn Tấn Dũng
- Succeeded by: Phạm Minh Chính

First Deputy Prime Minister of Vietnam
- In office 2 August 2011 – 7 April 2016
- Prime Minister: Nguyễn Tấn Dũng
- Preceded by: Nguyễn Sinh Hùng
- Succeeded by: Trương Hòa Bình

Member of the National Assembly
- In office June 2007 – 18 January 2023
- Constituency: Quảng Nam (2007–2016); Hải Phòng (2016–2021); Ho Chi Minh City (2021–2023)
- Majority: 96.65% (14th term)

Honorary President of the Vietnam Red Cross Society
- In office 30 August 2022 – 18 January 2023
- Preceded by: Nguyễn Phú Trọng
- Succeeded by: Võ Văn Thưởng

Minister of the Government Office
- In office 2 August 2007 – 3 August 2011
- Prime Minister: Nguyễn Tấn Dũng
- Preceded by: Đoàn Mạnh Giao
- Succeeded by: Vũ Đức Đam

Deputy Inspector-General of Vietnam
- In office March 2006 – May 2006
- Prime Minister: Nguyễn Tấn Dũng
- Chief: Quách Lê Thanh

Deputy Party Secretary of Quảng Nam
- In office 2001–2006
- Secretary: Vũ Ngọc Hoàng
- Succeeded by: Nguyễn Đức Hải

Personal details
- Born: 20 July 1954 (age 72) Quế Sơn, Quảng Nam, State of Vietnam (now Đà Nẵng, Vietnam)
- Party: Communist Party of Vietnam (1982–present)
- Spouse: Trần Thị Nguyệt Thu
- Children: 2
- Education: National Economics University; National Academy of Public Administration; National University of Singapore

Nguyễn Xuân Phúc (Vietnamese: [ŋwiən˦ˀ˥ swən˧˧ fʊwk͡p̚˧˦]; born 20 July 1954) is a Vietnamese former politician who served as the 11th president of Vietnam from 2021 until his resignation in 2023 amidst a series of corruption scandals. He also was the country's seventh prime minister from 2016 until 2021 and served as a member of the Politburo of the Communist Party of Vietnam for 3 terms from 2011 until his resignation in 2023.

Phúc became a member of the Communist Party of Vietnam in November 1983. He studied economic management at the Hanoi National Economic University between 1973 and 1978, after which he studied administrative management at the Vietnam National Administrative Academy. From 1978 to 1993, Phúc worked initially as a civil servant, before rising to become the deputy head of Quảng Nam-Đà Nẵng's People's Committee. Phúc then served in various government roles before becoming deputy prime minister and joining the Politburo for the first time in 2011 after the 11th Party Congress. On 5 April 2016, Phúc became prime minister after being chosen by President Trần Đại Quang to form a government. His tenure as prime minister oversaw a period of record economic growth and directed the country's response to the COVID-19 pandemic.

On 5 April 2021, Nguyen Xuan Phúc became the 11th President of Vietnam. As President, Phúc was the second highest official in Vietnam behind Nguyễn Phú Trọng, the General Secretary of the Communist Party, and was ranked 2nd in the Party's 13th Politburo. Phúc was also a full member of the National Assembly, serving in its 11th, 12th, 13th and 14th terms. His tenure has left a unique diplomatic mark such as successfully convincing major countries to share COVID vaccines in 2021 and improving diplomatic relations with South Korea in 2022. On 18 January 2023, at the 3rd Extraordinary Session, the National Assembly of Vietnam voted to dismiss him and relieved Phúc of his duties as a delegate to the 15th National Assembly. Previously, on 17 January 2023, the Central Committee of the Communist Party of Vietnam approved Phúc's resignation from his positions according to his personal wishes. The reason for his resignation is said to be his subordinates' involvement in notable corruption scandals.

== Early life ==
Phúc was born on 20 July 1954, in the commune of Quế Phú, district of Quế Sơn, Quảng Nam Province, in what was then the State of Vietnam. He took economic management at Hanoi National Economic University from 1973 to 1978. He was accepted to join the Communist Party of Vietnam on 12 May 1982, officially becoming a member of this party on 12 November 1983. From 1978 to 1979 he was among personnel at the Quảng Nam-Đà Nẵng Economic Board. From 1980 to 1993: Phúc was an employee, then deputy, rising to Chief of Office of the Quảng Nam – Đà Nẵng People's Committee. He studied administrative management at the Vietnam National Administrative Academy.

His father Nguyễn Hiền was born in 1918, and worked for the Democratic Republic of Vietnam before 1954, heading north in accordance with the Geneva Accord. He, his mother and siblings stayed in their hometown, where they studied at the village school. His mother and siblings secretly worked for the National Front for the Liberation of South Vietnam, and his sister was killed by the US military and the South Vietnamese government after a battle in 1965. In 1966, his mother was also killed. He lived with his sister in his hometown for a while, then was secretly brought to the North by the comrades of his parents in 1967.

=== Education ===
Phúc attended junior high school in his hometown of Quang Nam, Da Nang. In the period 1966 – 1968, he went to the Revolutionary War Zone and was trained by the Party in the North. He attended high school and was also the Secretary of the High School Youth Union from 1968 to 1972, graduating from general education on 10 October 1972. (Note: Vietnamese general education is divided into several periods. Before 1981, 10/10 general education, in 1981, the education reform started, the education system changed from 10 years to 12 years (skipping preschool), becoming 12/12 so far.)

From 1973, he moved to Hanoi, studied at the National Economics University, participated in activities in the Youth Union movement, and served as Secretary of the Union. In 1978, he graduated with a Bachelor of Economics from Hanoi National Economics University with a foreign language certificate in English B, Russian Literature B. In the 1990s, he studied State Administration. at the National Academy of Public Administration . In 1996, he was sent to study Economic Management at the National University of Singapore.

On 12 May 1982, he was admitted to the Communist Party of Vietnam, though the official date is 12 November 1983.

== Political career ==
=== Early career ===
From 1993 to 1996: Phúc was the director of Department of Planning and Investment of Quang Nam-Da Nang Province. He studied economic management at the National University of Singapore.

From 1997 to 2001, Phúc was a permanent member of the Provincial party committee (17th, 18th session); vice chairman, then the first vice chairman of the provincial People's Committee of Quang Nam Province and director of Industrial Zones Management Board of Quang Nam Province. He was a member of the provincial People's Council (6th session).

From 2001 to 2004: Vice Secretary of provincial party committee of Quang Nam Province, Chairman of the People's Committee of Quang Nam Province (term from 1999 to 2004). He was a member of Vietnam's National Assembly (11th session), head of Quang Nam Province's members of the National Assembly, and a member of the Committee for Economy and Budget of the National Assembly (11th session).

=== Entering national politics ===
In March 2006, he was appointed Deputy Chief Inspector of the Government. At the 10th National Party Congress, the party elected him to the Central Committee of the Communist Party of Vietnam. In June 2006, he was appointed Deputy Secretary of the Party Committee, Deputy Chairman of the Government Office. In August 2007, he was approved by the National Assembly as Minister of the Government of Vietnam.

From June 2006 to August 2007, Phúc was Permanent Vice Minister of the Office of Government, member of the 11th National Assembly's Economic and Budgetary Commission.

From August 2007 to January 2011, Phúc was Minister of the Office of Government, Head of the Prime Minister's Task Force for Administrative Procedure Reform.

From January 2011 to July 2011, Phúc was Member of the Politburo of the 11th CPV Central Committee, Minister of the Office of Government.

From 2 August 2011 to 7 April 2016, Phúc was the Deputy Prime Minister of Vietnam.

== Premiership (2016–2021) ==
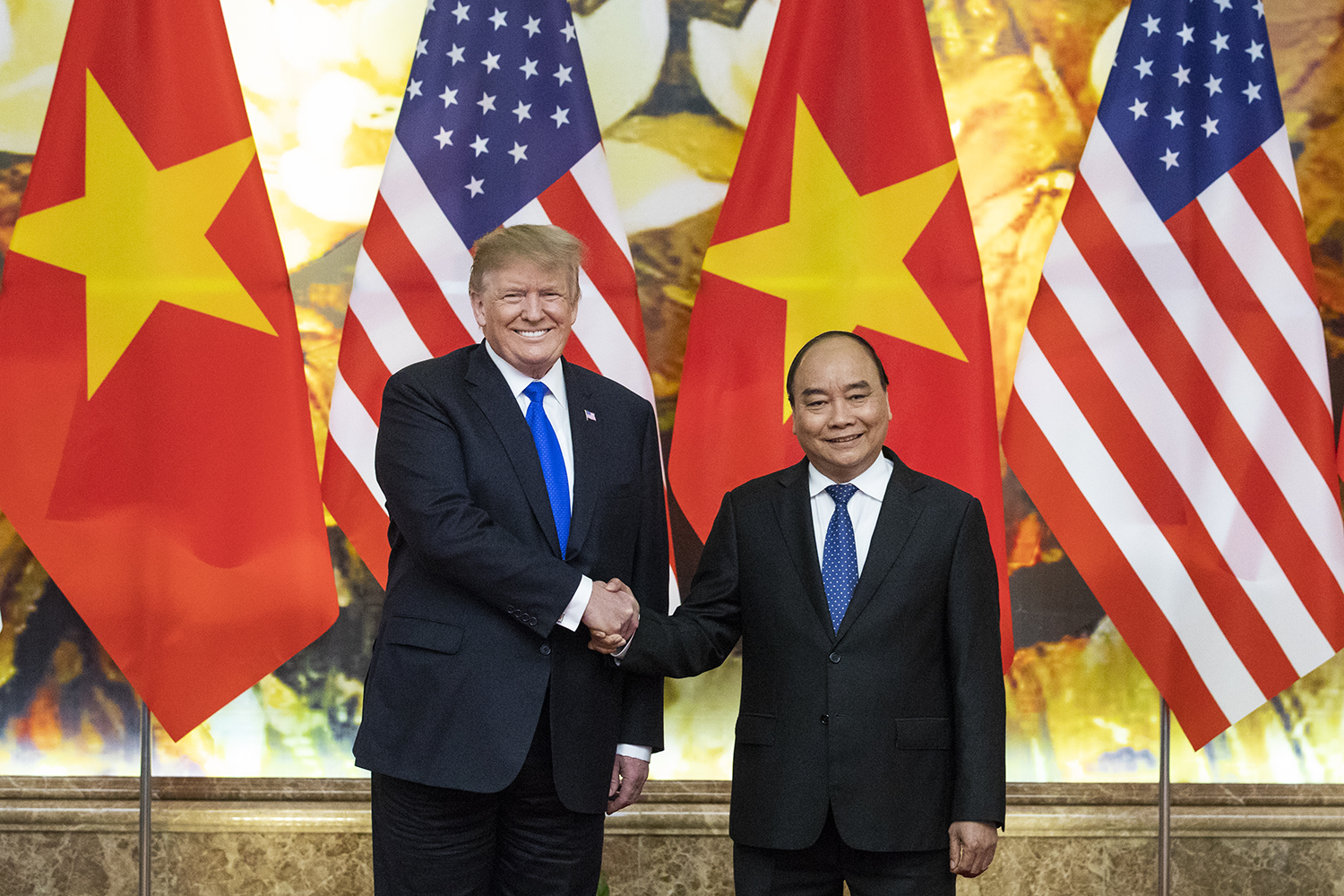
Nguyễn Xuân Phúc with U.S. President Donald Trump in 2019.

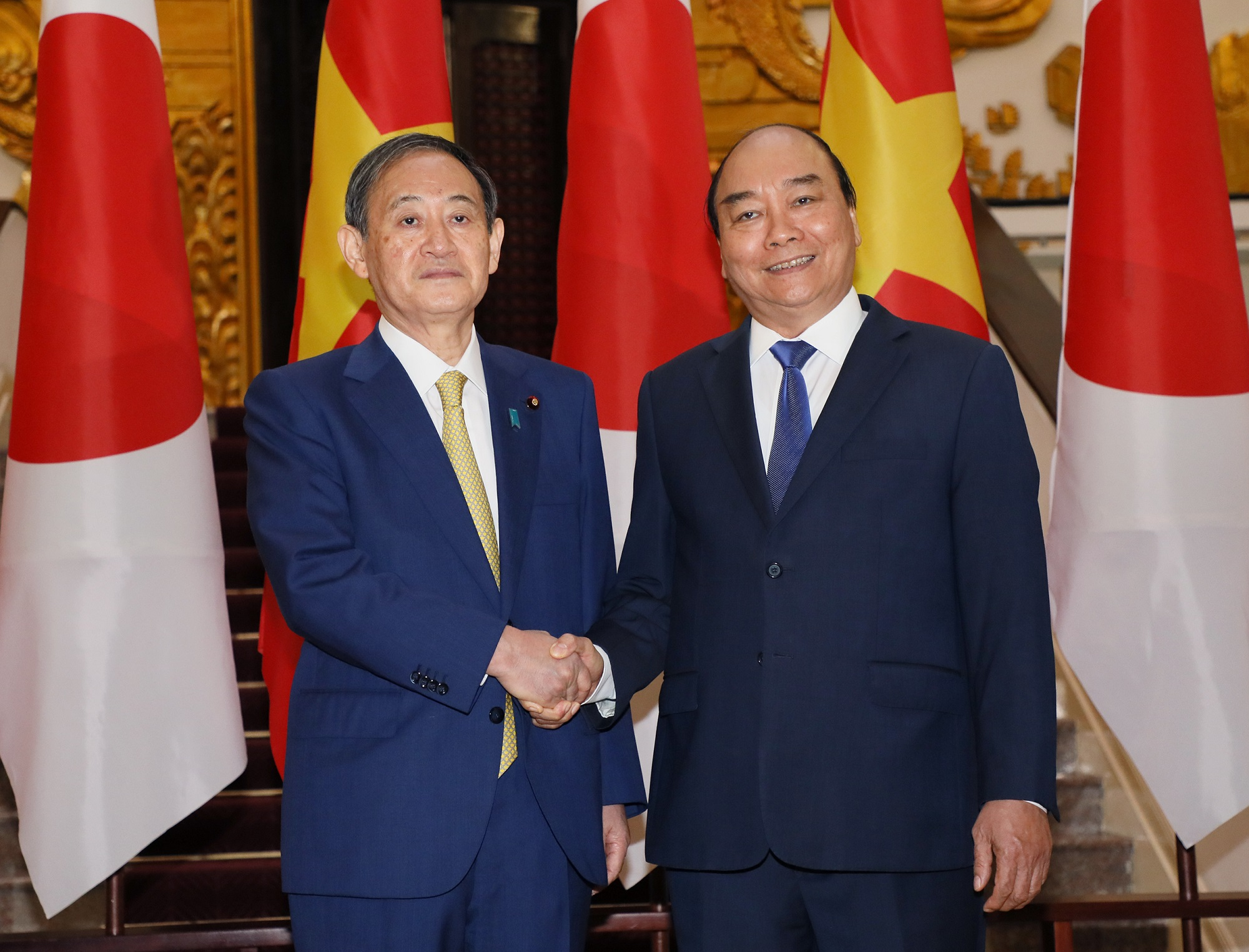
Nguyễn Xuân Phúc with Japanese Prime minister Yoshihide Suga in 2020.

On 7 April 2016, Phúc became the prime minister of the Socialist Republic of Vietnam at the 11th working session of the 13th National Assembly. During his tenure, he has been praised for overseeing Vietnam's successful response to the ongoing COVID-19 pandemic.

In the 2016–2021 period, Prime Minister Nguyễn Xuân Phúc leads the Government of Vietnam, facing many major events of the country, including the dynamics of socio-economic development, natural disasters, epidemics and epidemics. general problems of the country.

On 31 January 2021 Phúc was re-elected by the 13th Party Central Committee.

=== COVID-19 pandemic ===
In late 2019 and early 2020, the COVID-19 pandemic broke out worldwide. Nguyễn Xuân Phúc led the Vietnam's pandemic response, assigning Deputy Prime Minister Vũ Đức Đam to direct. He instructed all people to stay at home, only going out in cases of absolute necessity such as buying food, medicine, emergency, working at factories, production facilities, and business establishments. Business services, essential goods are not closed, stop operating and other emergencies; strictly implement the minimum distance of two meters when communicating; do not gather more than two people outside of offices, schools, hospitals and in public places. On 1 April 2020, Nguyễn Xuân Phúc announced the COVID-19 epidemic nationwide.

As for measures to support people, on 9 April 2020, Nguyễn Xuân Phúc issued a resolution on measures to support people facing difficulties due to the pandemic to share difficulties, ensure the lives of people and workers nationwide, contributing to social stability. On 24 April 2020, he continued to issue a directive on continuing to implement measures to prevent and control the COVID-19 epidemic in the new situation, while restarting and continuing economic development, ensuring safety. birth and social stability.

==== Vietnam's economy 2016–2021 ====
Vietnam’s economy maintains high growth momentum, maintains macroeconomic stability, controls inflation, and creates a favorable environment to promote economic growth. Average GDP growth from 2016 to 2019 reached 6.8%, in 2020 due to the impact of the COVID-19 pandemic but Vietnam still grew at 2.91%, the only country with positive growth among the 6 major economies in Southeast Asia. Public debt decreased from about 64.5% of GDP at the beginning of the term to 55.3% of GDP and was restructured more sustainably and safely, gradually shifting from foreign loans to domestic loans with longer terms and lower costs. Lower fees, bad debt down to 3%. Foreign exchange reserves reached a record of nearly 100 billion USD, strongly attracting domestic and foreign investment, strongly developing the private economy.

=== Environment ===
==== Formosa incident ====
Phúc claimed that the massive marine life destruction was "the most serious environmental disaster Vietnam has ever faced".

==== Floods in the Central region in 2020 ====
From October 2020, the natural disaster Floods in Central Vietnam in 2020 took place, also known as Flood after flood, Historic flood, a series of storm, floods throughout Central Vietnam, concentrated mainly in the provinces of Nghe An, Ha Tinh, Quang Binh, Quang Tri, Thua Thien Hue of North Central Coast, part of South Central Coast including Da Nang, Quang Nam, Quang Ngai, Binh Dinh, Phu Yen and North Central Highlands. This is considered a new historic flood, set at alert level IV, belonging to the dangerous natural disaster level, with great risk in Vietnam, with far-reaching effects and impacts. causing loss and damage throughout the region, destroying, delaying and pushing back the socio-economic development of Central Vietnam. As the supreme leader of the Executive Government, Prime Minister Nguyen Xuan Phúc has commanded plans to deal with natural disasters, helping the Central region overcome difficulties, assigning tasks to State, Central and local agencies. direct response, with the motto: "Unite the whole country towards the Central region".

== Presidency (2021–2023) ==
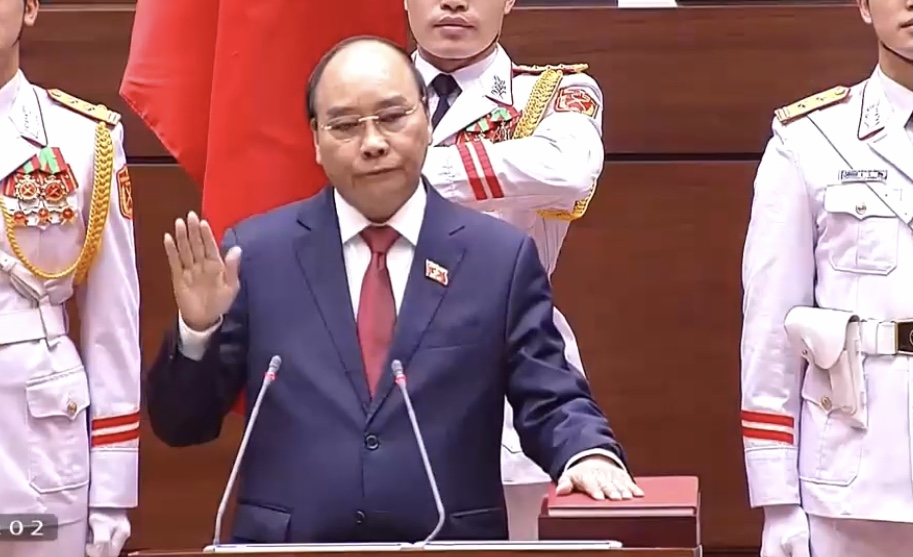
Phúc takes the oath of Presidency

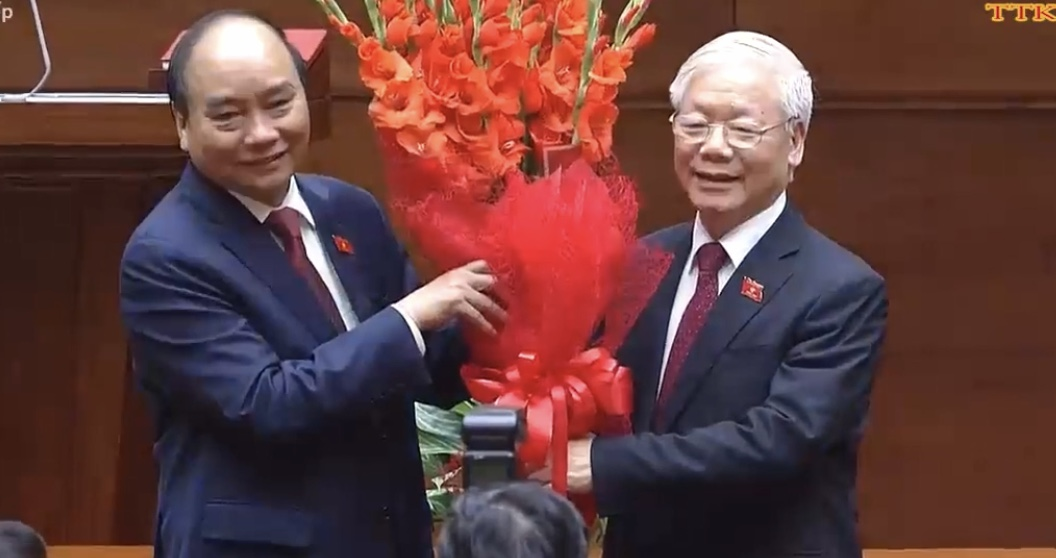
Phúc gives a bouquet of flowers to former President Nguyễn Phú Trọng

On 5 April 2021, Phúc was elected the 10th president of Vietnam, during a meeting session of the National Assembly, succeeding Nguyễn Phú Trọng who had previously announced his resignation from the role. He was the only nominated candidate for the role, the first incumbent prime minister to be elected president by the National Assembly, and the first prime minister to be elected president since Ho Chi Minh in 1945.

On 26 July 2021, he was elected by the National Assembly to hold the position of President of Vietnam for the 2021–2026 term with a rate of 96.79% (483/483 delegates present and voting approved, the total number of delegates to the 15th National Assembly is 499 delegates).

On 30 August 2022, he became the president of the Vietnam Red Cross Society.

=== COVID-19 pandemic ===
On the morning of 27 May 2021, Nguyễn Xuân Phúc said "I call on all walks of life, businesses, organizations, and our compatriots abroad... to contribute and support the "Our people and our entire army will soon defeat the epidemic" in the launching ceremony of "Peak round of donations to support Covid-19 prevention and control" organized by the Vietnam Fatherland Front Committee.

=== Visit to Russia ===
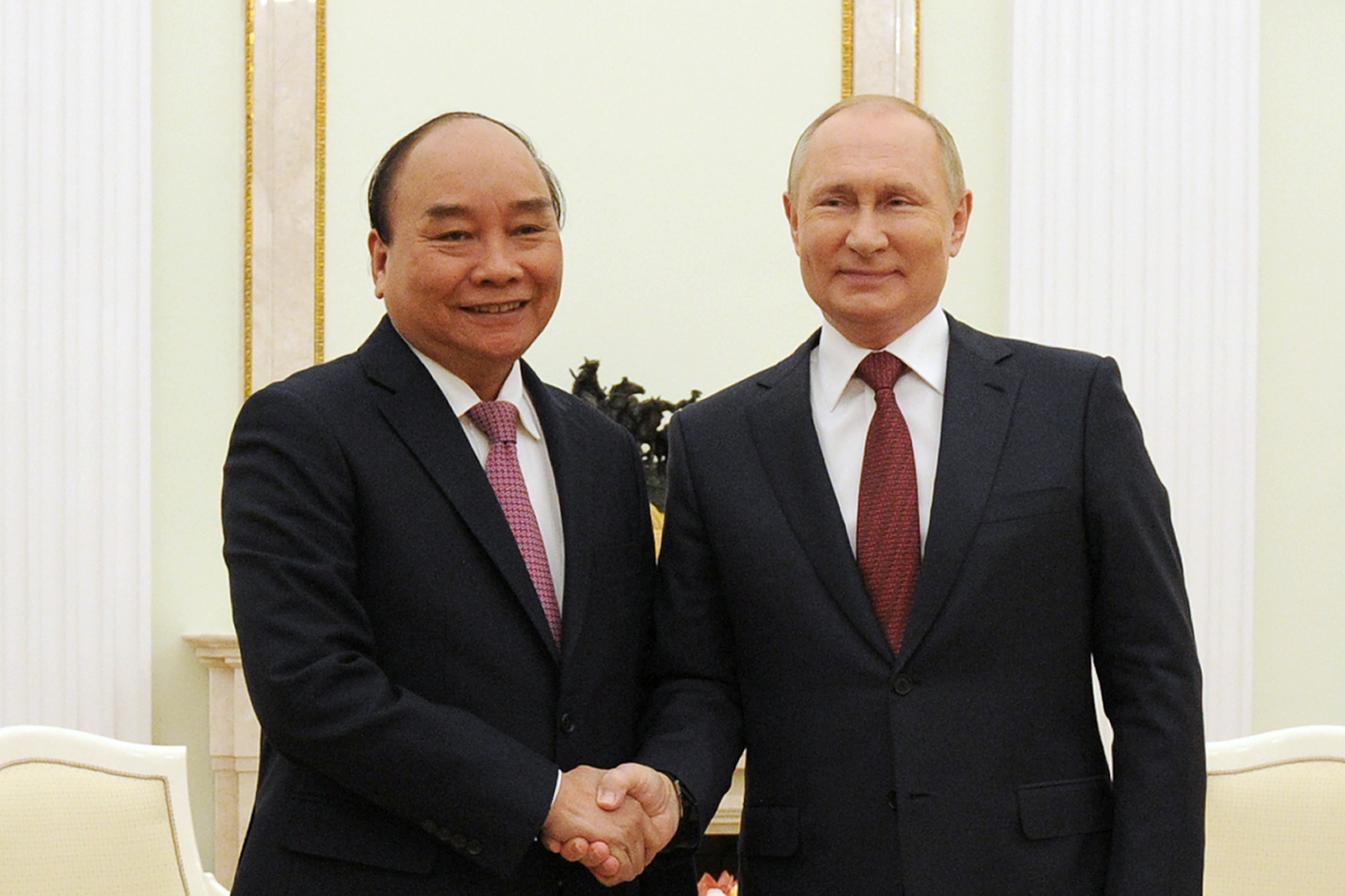
Russian President Vladimir Putin and President Nguyen Xuan Phúc at the Kremlin

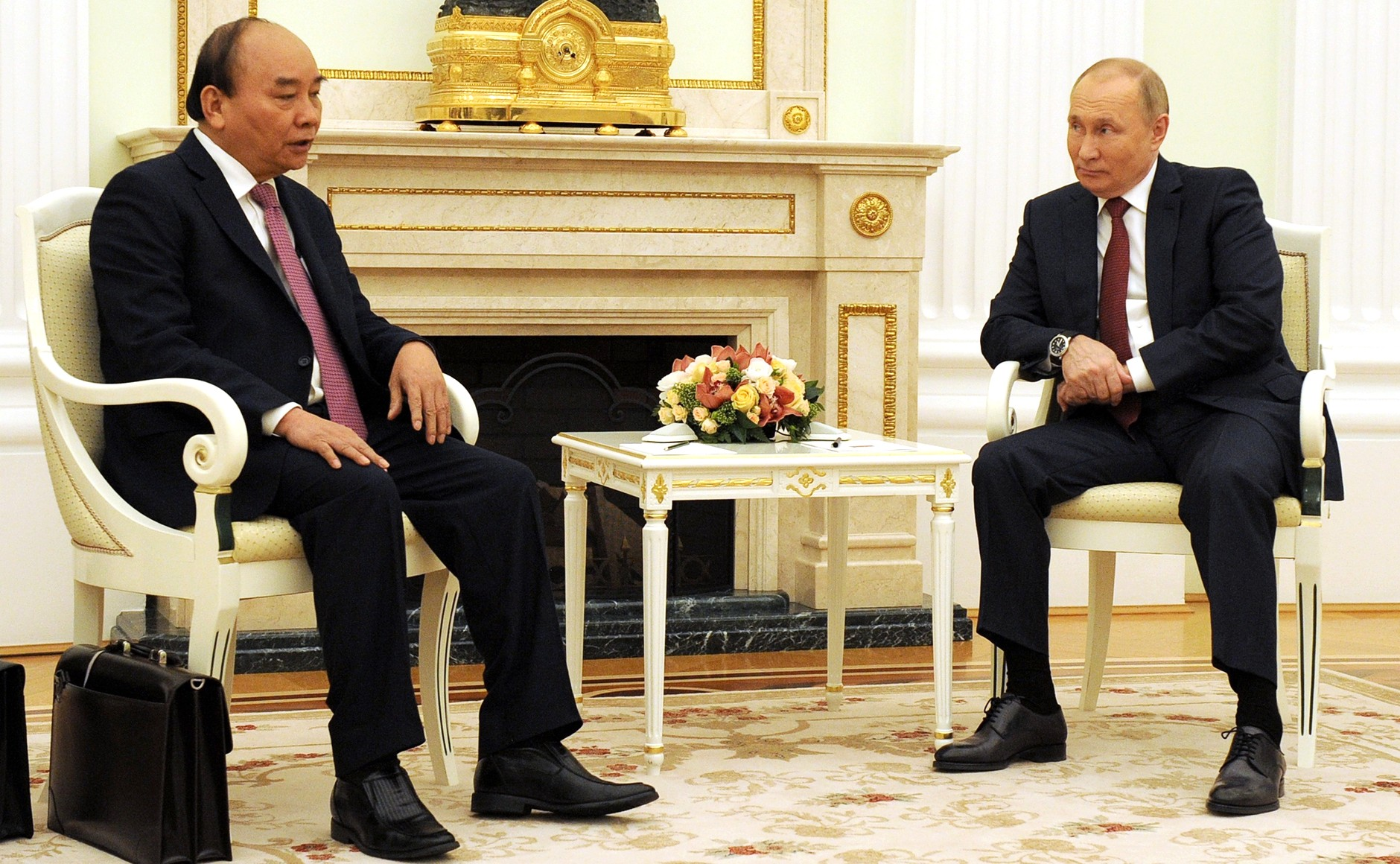
President Vladimir Putin and Mr. Nguyen Xuan Phuc discussed together at the Kremlin

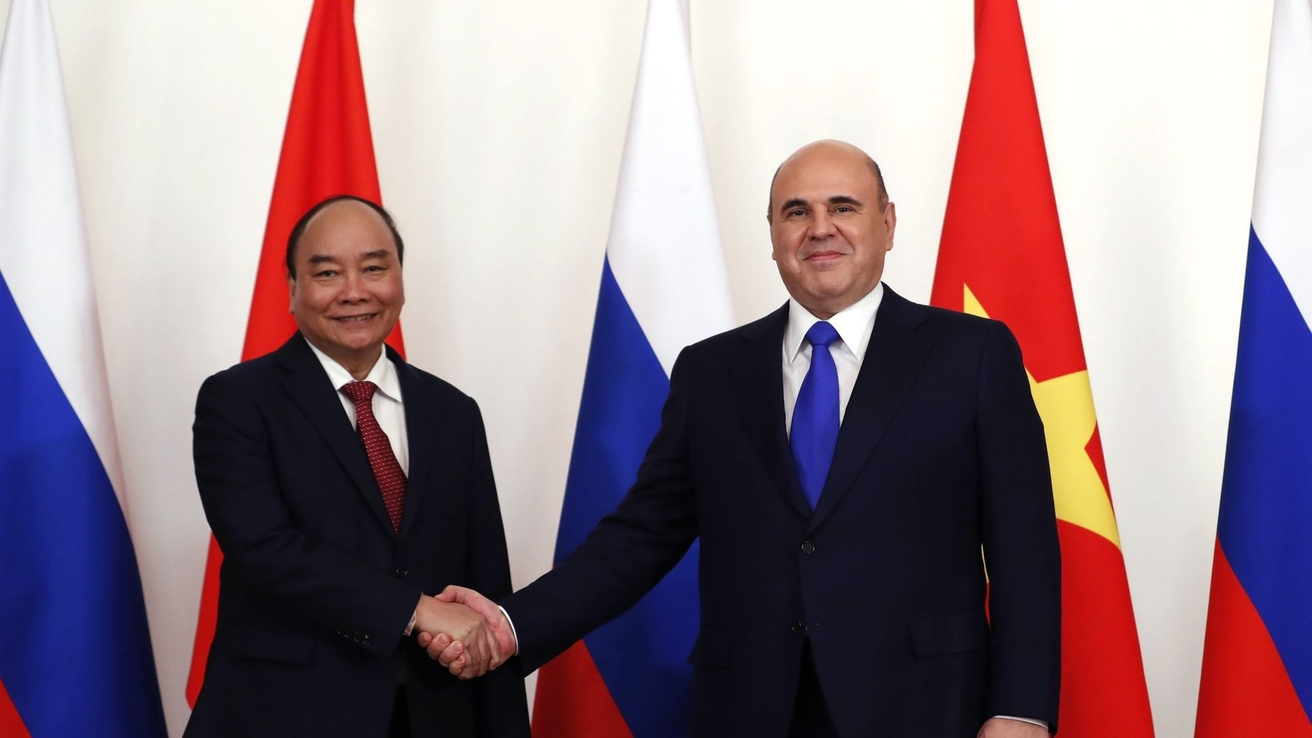
Russian Prime Minister Mikhail Mishustin and President Nguyen Xuan Phúc

Accompanying him and his wife was a high-ranking Vietnamese delegation who arrived at Vnukovo airport in the Russian capital Moscow, starting an official visit Russia from 29 November to 2 December, at the invitation of President Vladimir Putin.

The purpose of the visit is to strengthen cooperation between the two countries in the prevention of the COVID-19 pandemic, especially research and production of vaccines and medicines, and sharing of experience in disease prevention.

In the following joint statement, the two sides affirmed their determination to further strengthen the relations Vietnam-Russia comprehensive strategic partnership by 2030, considering the Consolidating strategic trust is the foundation for further expansion and strengthening of bilateral cooperation in all fields. According to Vietnamese Ambassador to the Russian Federation Dang Minh Khoi (Vietnamese: Đặng Minh Khôi), the time of talks between Nguyễn Xuân Phúc and Mr. Putin lasting nearly 4 hours is rare in similar events of the Russian president.

=== Economic policy ===
On 4 January, he said: “Many countries have strongly increased budget spending for economic recovery. We must accept increased public debt, budget deficits and increased credit under control. We must pump money into the economy and solve problems for growth."

He agreed with the proposals in the report on increasing overspending, borrowing from foreign exchange reserve funds, issuing bonds, supporting rental accommodation for workers, reducing taxes and fees, and reducing taxable income for businesses. industry, especially allocating state budget capital, increasing charter capital... Along with increasing credit and reducing interest rates, new currency creates a necessary volume to promote economic development. Such policies are very necessary at this time, to promote the country's socio-economic development, restore growth, and implement the Resolution of the 13th National Party Congress.

Commenting that the economy's "demand" is still weak, the president said that it is necessary to increase total "demand", especially in areas affected by the epidemic, and those in difficulty need support such as the poor, worker.

The president said that fiscal and monetary support for development during this difficult time is necessary, but the foundation is to maintain macroeconomics, especially inflation targets.

At the same time, he ordered the need to redesign the incentive mechanism and procedures for receiving fiscal, monetary and credit support packages for businesses and people, so that they can access them in the fastest and most convenient way. The best anti-embezzlement and waste.

=== Resignation ===
On 17 January 2023, he announced his resignation as President of Vietnam and retired from politics, taking responsibility for "wrongdoings and violations" by 539 subordinates in his government amidst a crackdown on corruption, which included the dismissal of two Deputy Prime Ministers and the arrest of the Minister of Health Nguyễn Thanh Long. In its statement on his resignation, the Vietnamese government evaluated him positively.

While admitting responsibility for the wrongdoing of his officials, he wrote off as conspiracy theories the claims that he or his family were directly engaged in or associated with the COVID-19-related Việt Á scandal.

"My family, my wife and children did not earn personal gains or commit corruption related to Việt Á, and have never met Việt Á director, and these have been clearly concluded by the Central Inspection Commission"

— Nguyễn Xuân Phúc,

=== Building a Rule of Law State ===
On the morning of 17 January 2022, in Da Nang City, the Steering Committee for the Project "Strategy for building and perfecting the rule of law state of Vietnam until 2030, with a vision to 2045" organized a national conference with topic: "Continuing to promote and improve the effectiveness of judicial reform to meet the requirements of building and perfecting the rule of law state of Vietnam until 2030, with a vision to 2045". Phúc as Head of the Steering Committee for Project Development, chaired the workshop.

== Personal life ==
His wife is Trần Thị Nguyệt Thu. He has two children, a daughter named Nguyễn Thị Xuân Trang (b. 1986, married to Vũ Chí Hùng in 2009) and a son named Nguyễn Xuân Hiếu. His son-in-law Hùng is the incumbent Vice Director General of the General Department of Taxation.

He has a brother named Nguyễn Quốc Dũng, born in 1947, who is the former Procurator General of the People's Procuracy of Da Nang. He had a living sister named Nguyễn Thị Thuyền (born after Dũng in 1952) and another sister who was shot by American soldiers during the Vietnam War.

== Award ==
- Order of José Martí (Cuba, 19 September 2021)

== Notes ==
Political offices
| Preceded by Nguyễn Tấn Dũng | Prime Minister of Vietnam; 2016–2021 | Succeeded by Phạm Minh Chính |
| Preceded by Nguyễn Phú Trọng | President of Vietnam; 2021–2023 | Succeeded by Võ Văn Thưởng |
Positions in intergovernmental organisations
| Preceded by Prayuth Chan-o-cha | Chair of the ASEAN; 2020 | Succeeded by Hassanal Bolkiah |
Order of precedence
| Preceded by Nguyễn Phú Trọng as General Secretary of the Communist Party of Vietnam | Rank of the Communist Party and the Government; 13th Politburo of the Communist Party of Vietnam | Succeeded by Phạm Minh Chính as Prime Minister of Vietnam |
