= Timeline of the COVID-19 pandemic in Vietnam =

Timeline of ongoing pandemic in Vietnam

The following is a timeline of the COVID-19 pandemic in Vietnam.

== Timeline ==
=== Overview ===
Coronavirus pandemic waves in Vietnam
Wave	Time	No. of cases			Description
Wave	Time	Sum	Domestic	Death	Description
1	23 January – 24 July 2020	415	106	0	The first cases discovered in Ho Chi Minh City were two people from Wuhan (China), the disease then spread in 13 other localities.
2	25 July 2020 – 27 January 2021	1,136	554	35	The epicenter was in Da Nang, the source of infection may have been from Hospital C in the city.
3	28 January – 26 April 2021	1,301	910	0	This outbreak started in Hai Duong from a person who was found positive after entering Japan, and the true source of the infection is unknown. The epicenter was in Hai Duong, this local outbreak accounting for nearly 80% of the total number of cases.
4	27 April 2021 – ongoing Last official number at 15 January 2024	11,622,343	11,617,255	43,171	Numerous outbreaks were discovered in all localities. This surge occurred due to the more transmissible Delta variant and Omicron variant.
Total	23 January 2020 – ongoing	11,625,195	11,618,825	43,206	

No. of confirmed cases, recoveries, active cases and deaths (linear)
No. of confirmed cases, recoveries, active cases and deaths (log)

==== First cases ====
The first two confirmed cases in Vietnam, a Chinese man, born in 1954 and his son, were admitted to Cho Ray Hospital, Ho Chi Minh City, on 22 January 2020. The son was believed to have contracted the virus from his father, who had earlier flown from Wuhan on 13 January, when they met in Nha Trang on 17 January. The first cluster also appeared in Son Loi Commune, Bình Xuyên District, Vĩnh Phúc after a few workers returned from a training trip in Wuhan and infected other people in close contact with them. The Vietnamese government immediately locked down Bình Xuyên District until 4 March 2020 to prevent the disease from spreading. This was the first large-scale lockdown outside China. Having known cases early is one of the main reasons why Vietnam was successful in fighting the virus. For the first 16 cases of the disease, the medical staff had to treat different types of patients, including infants, the elderly and people with underlying conditions. This was like "an exercises" for the Vietnamese medical system in order to prepare and study the new virus.

==== March 2020–2021: sporadic outbreaks and strict measures ====
When the pandemic spreads across the globe, the coronavirus cases in the country also surged, and on the evening of 6 March, the Hanoi Department of Health confirmed the first case in the capital, a 26-year-old woman who had travelled to Europe. This is the 17th case in Vietnam. On the afternoon of 20 March, the Ministry of Health announced 2 new COVID-19 patients, the 86th and 87th, who were two female nurses at Bạch Mai Hospital with no history of contact with any COVID-19 patients. In March and April 2020, the number of cases increased rapidly due to the large number of people coming from European countries and the appearance of clusters such as Bạch Mai Hospital, Ha Loi Commune in Hanoi and Buddha Bar in Ho Chi Minh City.

After 21 March 2020, Vietnam suspended entry for all foreigners from midnight of 22 March, and introduced concentrated isolation for 14 days in all cases of entry for Vietnamese citizens. From 1 April, Vietnam implemented a 15 days nationwide lockdown. On the same day, former prime minister Nguyễn Xuân Phúc announced the nationwide outbreak of COVID-19. The drastic epidemic control measures had positive results and the country did not confirm any cases of local transmission from mid-April to the end of July. Vietnam began loosening restrictions in May, including resuming domestic travel across the country.

===== Da Nang outbreak =====
The country entered second wave of infection when the Ministry of Health announced the 416th case in Da Nang, which was the first case with an unknown source of infection in 99 days. On 28 July, the Da Nang authorities immediately locked down the city for 15 days. Hundreds of cases across the country with epidemiological factors related to Da Nang were furthermore detected, and the first death was also recorded on 31 July. After two months, by using the same strategies that have been used in the first outbreak, Vietnam has successfully contained the disease for the second time and has resumed almost all economic activities, including international commercial flights. Sporadic community infections continue during November and December, causing public scare and heightened measures.

===== Hai Duong outbreak =====
The third wave of infection began on 28 January 2021, when Vietnam recorded an additional 84 community transmission cases within a single day in Hải Dương and Quảng Ninh provinces. Most of these are related to a single Hải Dương migrant worker, who was diagnosed with the UK coronavirus variant by Japanese authorities after arriving in Osaka on 17 January. Initially, the government only quarantine the areas directly related to the infected people to limit the economic impact. But after half a month the number of cases still showed no signs of stopping, so on 15 February, entire province of Hải Dương was locked down for 15 days while Hanoi and Ho Chi Minh City stopped all entertainment activities. This is one of the most serious outbreak due to slow tracing process, mismanagement in quarantine facilities and people starting to ignore lockdown rules after long period of restrictions. On 7 March 2021, the situation in northern provinces appears to have been largely brought under control when number of new cases fell to single digits. Along with that, Vietnam started its mass COVID-19 vaccination campaign on the next day.

From 3 September 2020 to 15 May 2021, the country recorded no new COVID-19 related deaths.

==== May 2021–present: Severe outbreak and 'endemic' stage ====
From the end of April 2021, Vietnam experienced "a fast-spreading outbreak" of more than 350,000 cases. Clusters have been found in industrial parks in Bac Giang province and then in at least ten major hospitals in the country. As the epidemic has spread to many provinces in Vietnam, many outbreaks are occurring in many localities at the same time, making it "nearly impossible" to trace and cut the chain of infection. According to WHO, to prepare for the worsening situation, the country has built more than 30 field hospitals with a scale of 1,500 ICU beds and 30,000 non-ICU beds. When total cases reached a few thousands per day, the Central government decided to lock down the entire Southern Region with 35 million people, along with the capital, Hanoi, to contain the spread. On 26 July 2021, for the first time in the country's disease prevention history, Ho Chi Minh City imposed a daily night curfew beginning at 6:00 pm. As a result, no one is permitted to leave the city, and only emergency services are permitted to operate. On 28 July, the National Assembly gave the central government in Hanoi mandate to implement emergency measures for curbing the pandemic locally. On 20 August, Nguyễn Thành Phong was dismissed by the Politburo as chairman of the People's Committee of Ho Chi Minh City. The government also mobilized 10,000 troops to the city to enforce the lockdown and deliver food supplies. One of the main reasons for this outbreak is a four-day holiday for Reunification Day and International Workers' Day, which saw many vacation destinations packed with travelers. In addition, gene sequencing results show that the SARS-CoV-2 Delta variant is the dominant variant in this wave, especially among cases in central and southern localities of Vietnam.

On 29 August, Prime Minister Phạm Minh Chính stated that Vietnam might have to live with the virus and could not rely on indefinite closures and quarantines. This marked a major change in the country's approach to COVID-19, forcing Vietnam to accelerate its vaccination campaign to control the pandemic. The number of new cases began to fall to several thousand per day in mid-September, and restrictions were eased. Vietnam recorded its first case of the Omicron variant in December, leading to a significant new wave of infections going into the first months of 2022, with the highest 7-day average of 206,402 cases recorded on 13 March. However, due to the country's widespread vaccination coverage, deaths remained low in proportion to the number of confirmed cases.

In March 2022, Prime Minister Phạm Minh Chính declared COVID-19 to be "endemic" and considered ending daily reporting of new cases. An article in Bloomberg noted that Vietnam has a high level of vaccination and has seen a dramatic drop in COVID-19 related deaths. However, in August, the Ministry of Health issued a recommendation to not declare COVID-19 endemic, and to instead shift the country's response from "prevention" to "stable management".

=== First wave ===
==== January 2020 ====
On 14 January, two Chinese tourists with fever symptoms from Wuhan were quarantined by the authorities and placed under observation after they landed at Da Nang International Airport. Hanoi dispatched a medical team to the coastal city and called an emergency meeting the next day on prevention efforts.

On 23 January, Vietnam confirmed the first two cases of COVID-19. Vietnam Ministry of Health issued two hotline numbers for information on the coronavirus disease, and advised citizens to contact the nearest healthcare center if they had its symptoms. On 24 January, acting minister of health Vũ Đức Đam ordered the activation of the Emergency Epidemic Prevention Centre. Vietnamese doctors documented and reported the two cases to medical journal The New England Journal of Medicine, at that time this was the first concrete evidence to the scientific community about human-to-human transmission of the disease outside China. On 29 January, the 2nd COVID-19 patient had fully recovered and was discharged. His father, who was the 1st COVID-19 patient in Vietnam, was discharged on 12 February.

On 29 January, the Ministry of Health established 40 mobile emergency response teams, on stand-by to assist affected locations, for quarantining, disinfecting, and transporting patients or suspected patients. A week after the first two cases, three positive cases were confirmed by the Ministry of Health, involving Vietnamese nationals who had returned from Wuhan. Case No. 3 (25-yr-old female) was quarantined and cured in Thanh Hóa Province, while the other two cases (#4: 29-yr-old male; #5: 23-yr-old female) were hospitalised in Hanoi. Case No. 5 was discharged on 3 February, fully recovered and after testing negative for the virus.

==== February 2020 ====
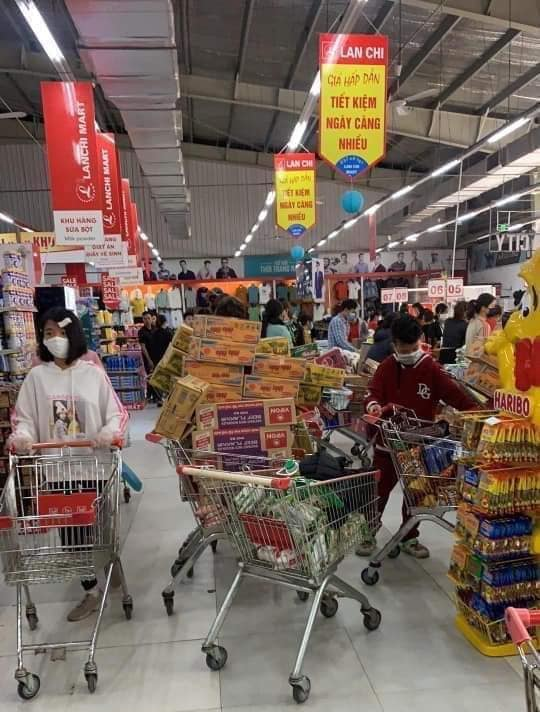
Vietnamese people panic buying instant noodles in a supermarket during the early days of the pandemic.

On 1 February, a 25-year-old woman (#6) was declared coronavirus-positive in Khánh Hòa Province. She has worked as a receptionist and had direct contact with the Chinese father and son (cases #1–2). This case was discharged from the hospital on 4 February. Noticeably, this case was the first domestic transmission in Vietnam, leading to an epidemic declaration signed by the Vietnamese Prime Minister and calls for border tightening, aviation permits revoked, and visa restriction.

On 2 February, a Vietnamese American (#7) got infected with coronavirus, due to two-hour layover in Wuhan airport during his trip from the US.

After 3 February, everyone entering from China to Vietnam must comply with the 14-day epidemiological check-up and health-monitoring procedure to ensure that the COVID-19 epidemic does not getting worse.

On 3–4 February, Vietnam announced their eighth and ninth case: a 29-year-old female (#8) and a 30-year-old male (#9). They belonged to the same training team with the previous confirmed cases of three (cases #3-through-5).

Later on 4 February, the 10th case was identified. A 42-year-old female met and greeted with the case No. 5 during Lunar New Year holiday. Mother (49-year-old, #11) and younger sister (16-year-old, #12) of the case No. 5 were also transmitted on 6 February.

On 7 February, Vietnam confirmed their 13th case, a 29-year-old worker, a member of the same training crew as the 5 previously confirmed cases (case #3,4,5,8,9).

Earlier of the same day, Vietnam declared to have successfully cultured and isolated the virus in the lab, one of the early countries to do this, along with Singapore, Australia, Japan and China.

On 9 February, a 55-year-old woman, a neighbour of case No. 5, tested positive; the 14th case.

On 10 February, three more cases: #4, #5 and #9 were declared to be recovered.

The 15th case was identified on 11 February, a 3-month-old grandchild of case No. 10. This case also marked the 10th case found in Vinh Phuc and prompted Vinh Phuc province leadership to implement quarantine of the at-risk village named Son Loi with more than 10,600 people, activating mobile food shops and handing out free masks to all villagers, in an effort to contain the spread of the virus. 10,600 villagers were divided into groups of 50–60 households each, each group assigned to a supervision team responsible for daily household visits and health-checks. The quarantine of Son Loi village was scheduled to last 14 days.

On 13 February, father of case No. 5 was tested positive, making the number of cases in Vietnam 16.

On 25 February, the 16th was released from the hospital after being tested negative from the COVID-19, temporarily made Vietnam cleared from COVID-19 outbreak. However, quarantine measures continue to be imposed until further notice.

On 3 March, after 20 days without new case of coronavirus, Son Loi village was approved to remove quarantine.

==== March 2020 ====
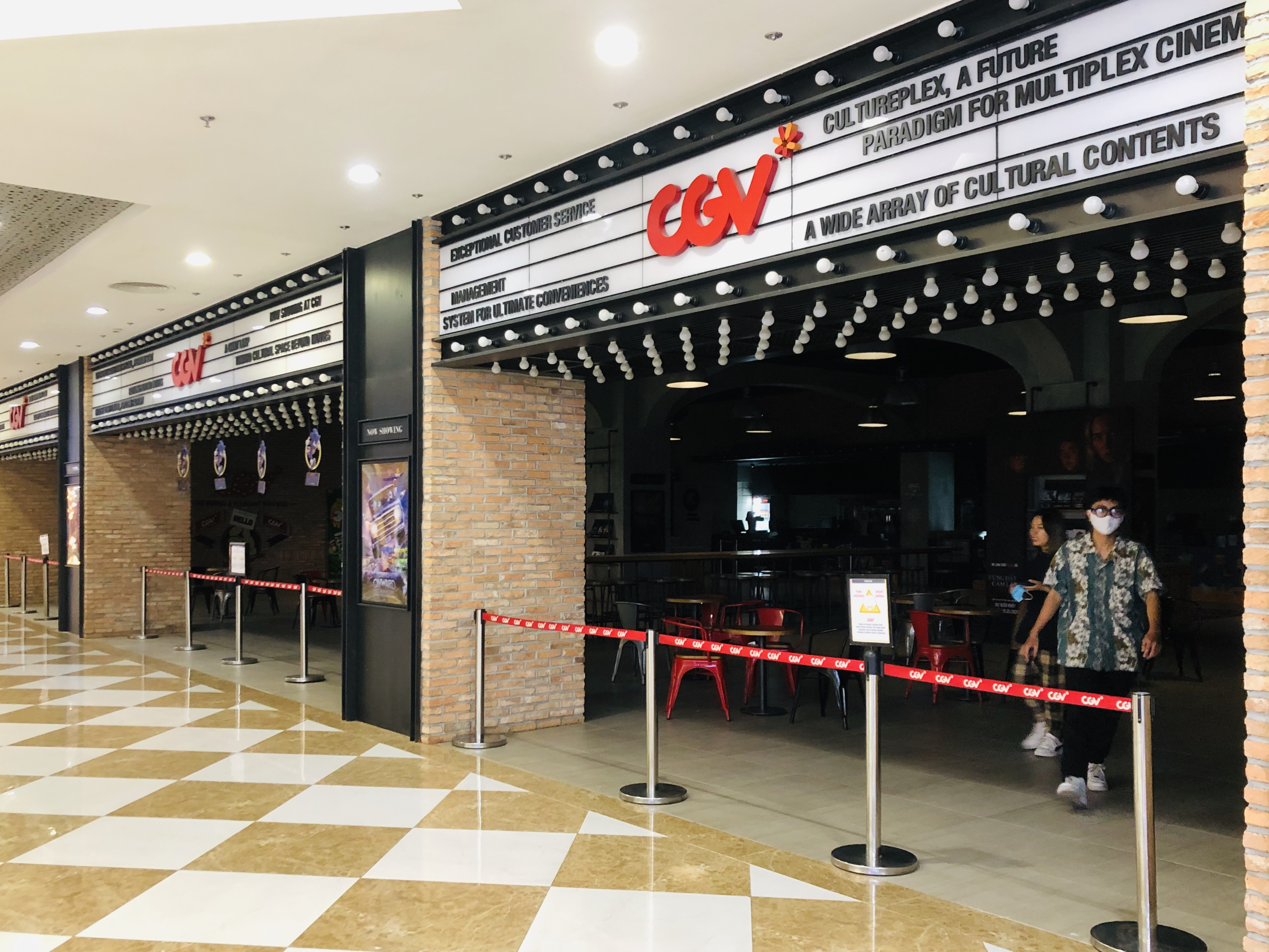
CGV Cinema at Hanoi Times City, temporarily closed in March 2020.

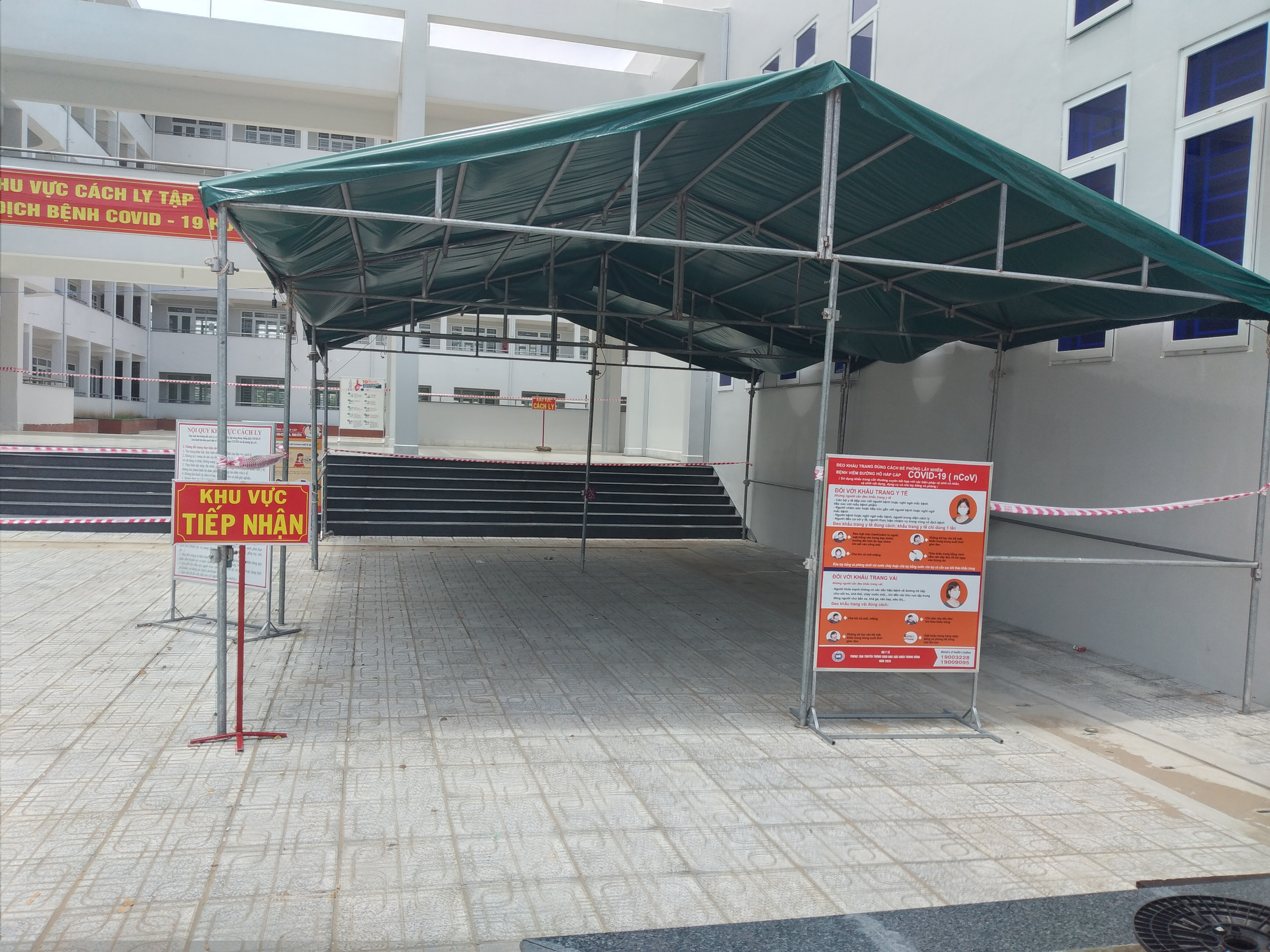
A quarantine area in Vietnam during COVID-19

On 6 March night, Hanoi urgently announced a new case of coronavirus, the first one found in the capital of Vietnam. The patient (case #17), a 26-year-old woman, had been travelling across Europe during the outbreak. She had been exhibiting several symptoms, but didn't cooperating with the authorities about her travel history or health conditions to avoid quarantine. Within the night, the government proceeded to track and isolate roughly 200 people who either had close contact, lived on the same street, or had been on the same flight VN0054 from London as patient No. 17. The incident also sparked a wave of stockpiling purchases across the city.

On 7 March afternoon, a 27-year-old Vietnamese was diagnosed with COVID-19 and moved into quarantine in Ninh Bình Province for treatment, making this the 18th case. This patient had previously been in Daegu for several days in February and, prior to testing positive, had already been quarantined – along with all passengers on the same flight from South Korea – since he re-entered Vietnam. Just 2 hours later, the Vietnamese Ministry of Health confirmed 2 more cases (#19-#20) in Hanoi, both related to the 17th case. The same day, Hanoi city expanded the scope of contact tracing to F5 and raised the quarantine procedures by one level, meaning F1 to be quarantined in hospitals and treated the same as a patient case, F2-F3 to be moved into central quarantine, and F4-F5 to self-quarantine at home, with temperature checked twice per day.

On 8 March, another case in Hanoi was announced, which was a 61-year-old man. Later this day, 9 more cases was announced, with 4 cases in Quảng Ninh, 2 cases in Lào Cai, 2 cases in Đà Nẵng and 1 case in Thừa Thiên – Huế. All ten cases (#21-#30) were foreigners tracked from the same flight into Vietnam with case No. 17.

On 9 March evening, a 49-year-old British man was tested positive (case #31) and put into quarantine in Quảng Nam Province, previously on the same flight with patient number 17.

On 10 March, a 24-year-old Vietnamese woman who had just returned from England and previously had close contact with case No. 17 while in London, tested positive (case #32). She had flown back to Vietnam in a private jet with quarantined cabin – after becoming aware that case No. 17 was infected – to seek healthcare in her home country. Later that day, another British man was found infected with the virus (case #33), who was on the same flight with case No. 17. Before the end of the day, the 34th case was identified, a 51-year-old businesswoman who had visited the United States, with a brief transit in Korea and Qatar during the trip.

On 11 March, Vietnam confirmed their 35th case of COVID-19, a 29-year-old woman who works in an electronics supermarket in Da Nang, and had physical contact with two infected British tourists. Within the same day, 3 more case were discovered (#36-#38), all are related to patient number 34.

On 12 March morning, Vietnamese Ministry of Health reported the 39th case of the country. This case is a 29-year-old tour guide in Hanoi, who had contact with patient number 24 during a trip to Ninh Binh. Evening of the same day, five more cases were announced (#40-#44), all are related to patient number 34.

On 13 March three more cases (numbers 45 to 47) were announced, related to case No. 34, case No. 17, and the flight VN0054 from London.

On 14 March 6 cases were announced (numbers 48 to 53). Aside from cases related to flight VN0054 and patient 34, there are 3 unrelated cases: A Vietnamese came back from Paris, a Vietnamese overseas student who has been travelling across Europe, and a Czech national.

On 16 March, a new case was reported in Vietnam, known as the 61st patient. The patient, a Muslim from the Cham minority, had participated in the Tablighi Jamaat in Sri Petaling mosque, Malaysia, where he got infected before returning to Vietnam and attended the Jamiul Muslimin Mosque in Ho Chi Minh City before returning home in Ninh Thuận. Due to the wide range of people he contacted, it raised the fear of the patient being a super spread patient. Eventually, the Vietnamese authorities decided to isolate and quarantine the whole province, as well as shut the mosque. Subsequently, a new-found case connected with the man were also discovered the following days. On 22 March, another case also related to the Islamic activities is a fellow Muslim who returned from Malaysia also attended in the same Sri Petaling mosque, before went back to Vietnam and still did Islamic praying five times a day in Jamiul Anwar mosque, despite being asked to quarantine at home.

On 22 March, Vietnam recorded over fourteen new patients, surpassing over 100 patients for the first time. Many returned from various countries, including Britain, Malaysia, and France; which were at the time severely hit by COVID-19.

On 26 March, 12 more cases were confirmed.

==== April–June 2020 ====
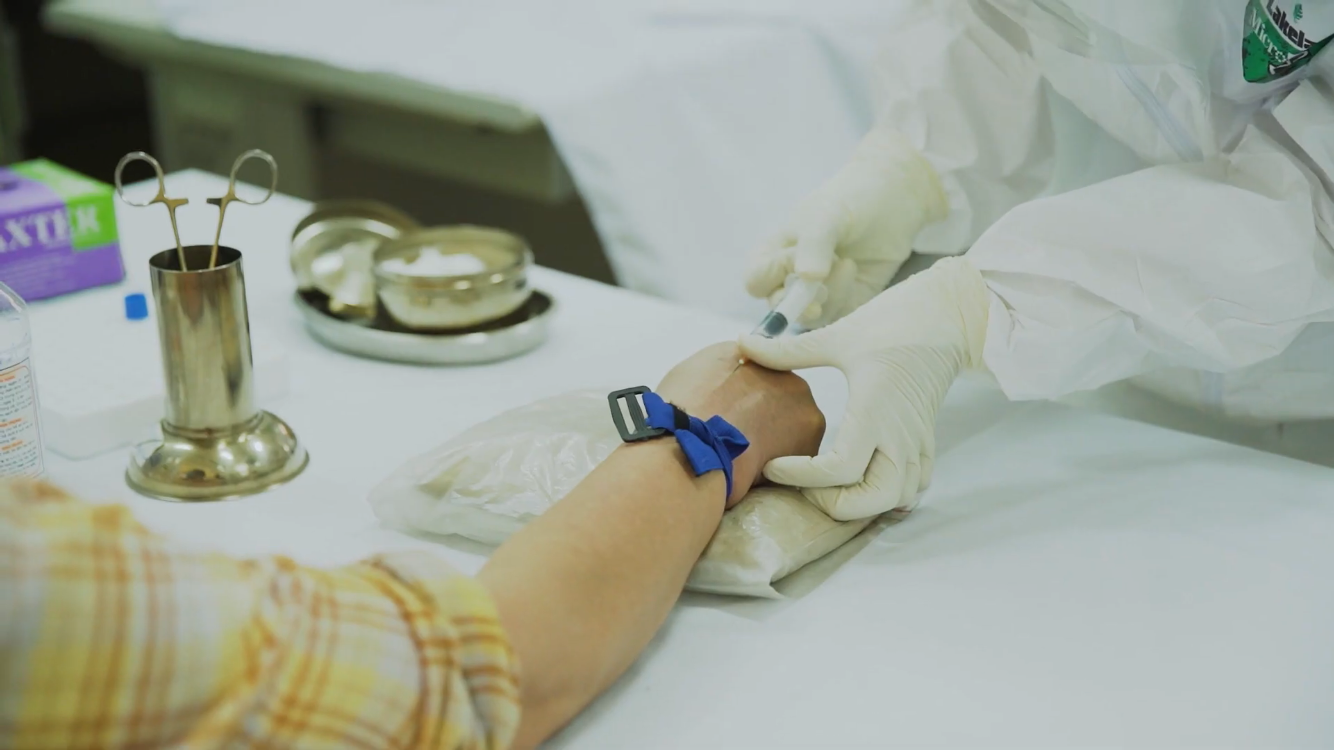
Doctor taking blood sample for COVID-19 rapid testing at Hoang Mai Market, Hanoi.

From 17 to 23 April, no new cases were confirmed. However, there were reports of cases who tested positive again after being discharged. On 22 April, People's Committee of Đồng Văn District decided to lockdown Dong Van town for six days after confirmed the first cases in the province on 16 April.

On 24 April, two more cases were confirmed: both were Vietnamese students who came back from Japan and quarantined on arrival.

A previously discharged patient in Hà Nam was pronounced dead on 4 May, later confirmed to have died from liver failure and not COVID-19. The patient had previously gone to the hospital on 20 March to treat last stage of liver disease, before testing positive for COVID-19 on 7 April. He received treatment for it and was subsequently discharged on 17 April after testing four times negative from coronavirus.

On 15 May, Vietnam confirmed 24 new cases, all of them from a repatriating flight from Russia and quarantined after arrival in Thai Binh and Quang Ninh, raising the total number of COVID-19 cases to 312.

On 29 May, after a long period without any confirmed cases of local transmission, Vietnam Airlines announced that it had completely restored its domestic flights after months under lockdown; international flights, however, remain suspended.

On 25 June, a flight from Japan to Vietnam took off from Narita International Airport; this was the first flight since the two countries agreed to ease travel restrictions which were imposed due to the COVID-19 pandemic.

=== Second wave ===
==== July 2020 ====
On 6 July, a group of doctors who had been overseeing the treatment of "Patient 91", a British pilot who was Vietnam's most critical COVID-19 case, announced that he "has made substantial progress and his health condition allows him to travel". The patient was discharged from Cho Ray Hospital in Ho Chi Minh City a few days later.

By the end of July, Vietnam had gone more than three months without new COVID-19 cases from local transmission. All recent cases were people who had been infected abroad and who had been placed in government quarantine facilities after arrival in Vietnam.

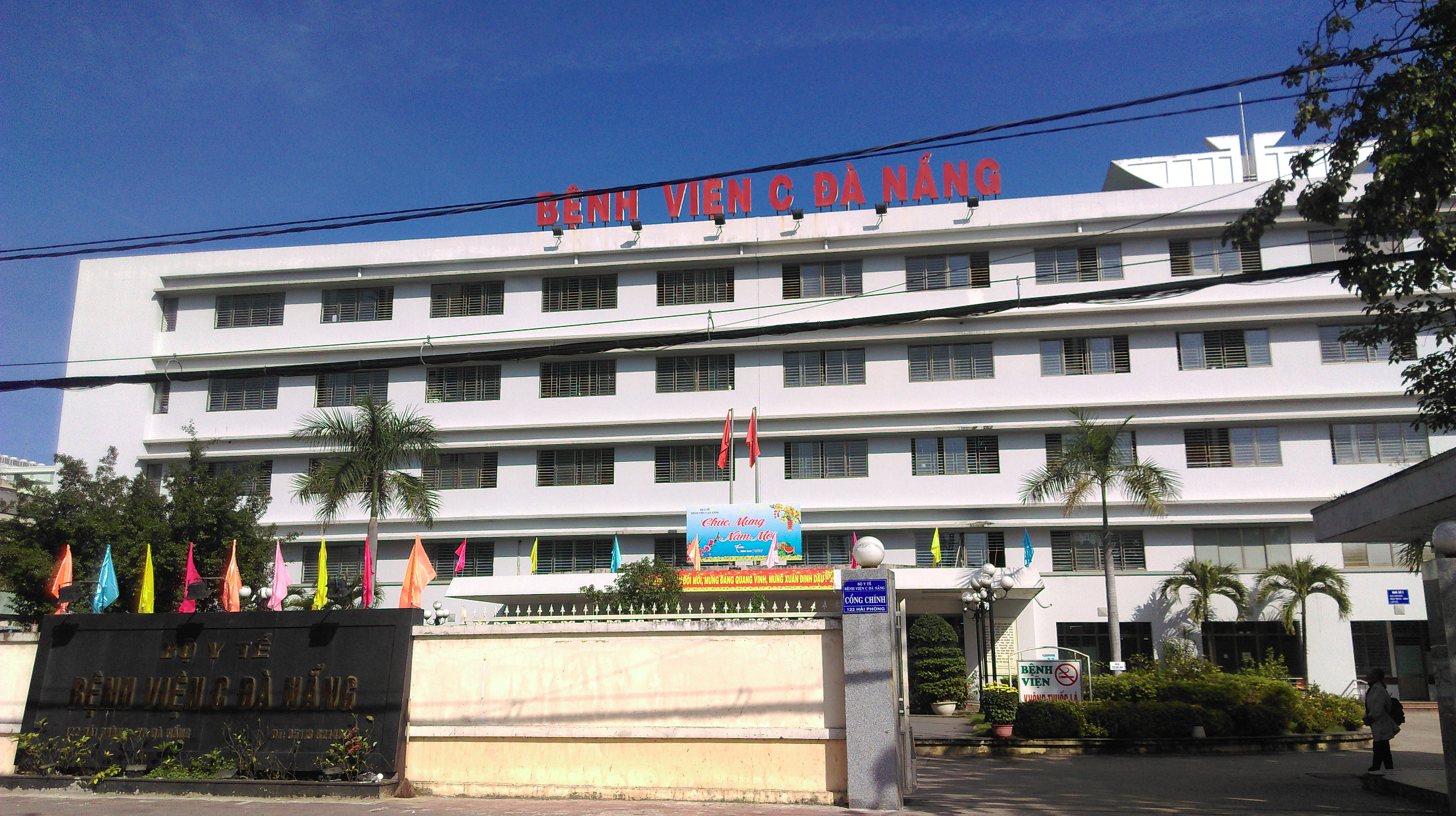
Da Nang C Hospital. After detecting the patient positive with COVID-19 visited there, the authorities decided to quarantine the hospital with everyone inside it for at least 14 days.

On 22 July, a 57-year-old man went to Da Nang C Hospital coughing and feeling tired. After diagnosing him with pneumonia, the doctors took samples for testing for COVID-19, and got a positive result. His samples were sent to the Pasteur Institute in Nha Trang and to the National Institute of Hygiene and Epidemiology in Hanoi for more tests and the results also came back positive.

The night of 23 July, the Da Nang Center for Disease Control and Prevention (Da Nang CDC) took samples from more than 100 people thought to have been in contact with the man during the previous days, including his family members, and all of them tested negative. More than 50 people who had been in contact with the suspected patient at the Da Nang C Hospital were quarantined immediately and the hospital was locked down the next day. In the afternoon of 24 July, the man suspected of being infected with COVID-19 was suffering from acute and severe pneumonia and had to be supported by ECMO. The Ministry of Health determined that the possibility it was a positive case was very high. The deputy director of the Da Nang Department of Health said the patient was being treated at the Da Nang Hospital Department of Tropical Medicine.

On the same day, the Vietnamese acting minister of health Nguyễn Thanh Long ordered the city authorities to suspend all international flights at Da Nang International Airport. The ministry rolled out extensive countermeasures and immediately sent a group of doctors from Cho Ray Hospital in Ho Chi Minh City to Da Nang to assist with the case. Deputy Prime Minister Vũ Đức Đam, head of the National Steering Committee for COVID-19 Prevention and Control, urged all competent forces to remain vigilant and stand ready to deal with new developments of the pandemic. On 25 July, the Ministry of Health confirmed the case in Da Nang, ending 99 continuous days of Vietnam not confirming any local transmission cases.

After the case was confirmed, Prime Minister Nguyễn Xuân Phúc ordered the Ministry of Public Security to investigate and deal with a crime ring that illegally trafficked foreigners into Da Nang and Quang Nam. The police arrested three people, including two Vietnamese nationals and one Chinese national for "organizing illegal entry into Vietnam" after they found that dozens of Chinese nationals were illegally crossing the border. Recent reports of a large number of foreigners, mainly Chinese, illegally entering the country, showing "lax immigration management".

On 26 July, Da Nang confirmed three more cases in community. Case #418, a 61-year-old man living in Hải Châu District, was in serious condition, and had to use a ventilator. Authorities are investigating whether this case related to the previously discovered patient in Da Nang one day earlier. Two remaining cases (Case #419 and #420) are a 17-year-old teenager and a 71-year-old woman, all of whom were related with Da Nang C Hospital.

Four days later, the country confirmed dozens of cases in five cities and provinces all related to Da Nang.

On 31 July, Vietnam confirmed 82 new cases, including 45 cases in Da Nang, 20 cases in Hanoi, 8 cases in Quang Nam Province, 6 cases in Ba Ria-Vung Tau Province, and 3 cases in Ho Chi Minh City. On the same day, the first two deaths due to COVID-19 occurred in Vietnam: patient 428 and 437, two elderly 70 and 61 years old man respectively, who appeared to have contracted the virus in Da Nang.

==== August 2020 ====
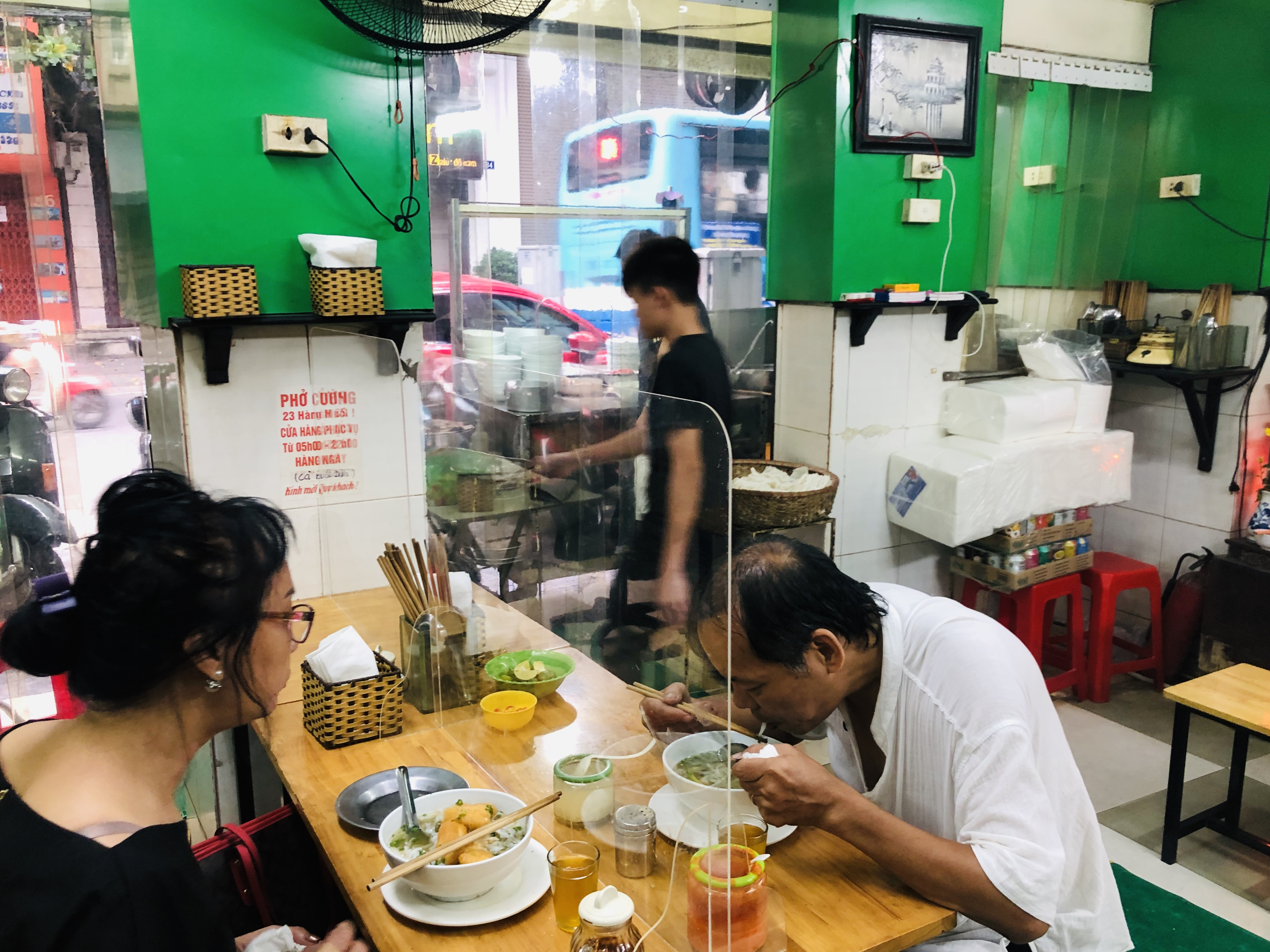
Bulkhead barrier in a restaurant in Hanoi. Beginning from 19 August 2020, bars and restaurants which do not follow epidemic prevention protocols will be fined and forced to close.

More than 200 health workers from all over Vietnam are sent to the central coastal provinces to support the epidemic prevention. The Cuban government also sent a team of health experts into the epicenter, Da Nang.

On 6 August, Vietnam confirmed its tenth death, the first to be diagnosed as having COVID-19 after death. The authorities began mass testing around the country for people coming from Da Nang in July.

On 7 August, an officer of the 377th Air Defence Division tested positive and the local health officials immediately quarantined 14 close contacts. This was the first case related to military personnel in the country.

On 14 August, the Vietnamese government decided to isolate Hải Dương city for 15 days after four residents tested positive, none of whom had travel history to Da Nang. On the same day, the Ministry of Health announced that Ho Chi Minh City had 1 new case of COVID-19, patient 912, a Chinese man who crossed the northern border illegally into Vietnam. Out of 152 cases of illegal entry discovered in Ho Chi Minh City since May, Chinese people account for 72%, Cambodians 11%, and the rest were Vietnamese and Korean, the Center for Disease Control in Ho Chi Minh City (HCDC) said. This raises concerns about an outbreak from people who entered illegally into the city area.

On 30 August, Vietnam recorded its first day without new cases since the beginning of the second outbreak.

==== September–November 2020 ====
From 1 September, Vietnam started charging people coming from other countries for quarantine and reduced the 14-day centralized quarantine policy to maximum seven days for foreign experts, investors, managers, and diplomats entering the country for less than two weeks. After this period of time, if a person tests negative for the coronavirus, they can remain in Vietnam. The Civil Aviation Administration of Vietnam (CAAV) have prepared detailed plans for resuming commercial flights to six Asian destinations such as Seoul, Guangzhou, Tokyo and Taipei from 15 September with around 5,000 foreign passengers scheduled to arrive in Vietnam per week. Passengers must provide COVID-19 negative certificate issued by the host country within three days before boarding.

After the central government considered that the COVID-19 outbreak has been brought under control, on 7 September, Da Nang has decided to ease its social distancing restrictions, and all passenger transportation and business enterprises resumed normal operations. On the same day, all 180 bars and discos in Ho Chi Minh City re-opened.

As of 28 October, Vietnam has not found any new cases of community transmission. However two cases who had just left the country were detected by the Japanese authorities. The first one was a 33-year-old Japanese businessman who had been working in Hai Phong since June. When he arrived at Kansai International Airport, he was tested by PCR and on 5 October the result came back positive. After being informed about the case, the Hai Phong Department of Health isolated 152 close contacts and quarantined the hotel he had stayed. Two days later, all 152 test results came back negative. The second case was a 48-year-old South Korean expert who was residing in Ho Chi Minh City and tested positive for COVID-19 after leaving the city for Japan on 25 October. City health officials quarantined 343 close contacts and tested them; all the tests were negative.

On 29 November, the Ministry of Health recorded a newly confirmed case of COVID-19 known as patient 1342, he was a 28-year-old male Vietnam Airlines flight attendant who returned to Vietnam from Japan on 14 November. Upon arrival in country, the flight crew members were quarantined in a quarantine facility of Vietnam Airlines in Ho Chi Minh City. After two negative tests, the flight attendant was allowed to be home-quarantined at his rented apartment in Tân Bình District. During the home-quarantine, the flight attendant has had direct contacts with three people including his mother and his two friends (one male and one female). On 28 November, sample was taken from the flight attendant for the third time and showed positive results for SARS-CoV-2. Investigation revealed that previously, during the period of 14–18 November, while in the centralized quarantine facility, patient 1342 had contact with a colleague known as patient 1325 from another flight from Romania.

On 30 November, the Ho Chi Minh City Center for Disease Control (HCDC) announced one case tested positive for COVID-19, a 63-year-old female in Hóc Môn District (mother of patient 1342), without confirming the case. After an investigation, 5 people who had had close contact with the patient were identified; none of them wore face masks. The authorities also conducted disinfection procedures at the places the patient lives and had visited. On the same day, the HCDC confirmed one more case, an English teacher (friend of patient 1342) living in District 6. On the afternoon of 30 November after receiving the information, Minister of Health Nguyễn Thanh Long convened an emergency meeting with the Ho Chi Minh Department of Health to implement full pandemic prevention measures across the city. At the meeting, it was announced that the newly discovered positive case was directly related to patient 1342 announced on 29 November. This was the first new case after the city went four months without confirmed cases from community transmission.

==== December 2020 ====
On 1 December, Ho Chi Minh City announced two more cases. One was a one-year-old boy in District 6. His parents had sent him to patient 1347's home to look after him a few days previously. On 30 November, after patient 1347 tested positive, the HCDC put him and the mother in quarantine at the City Children's Hospital. The father and other family members were quarantined at home. The second one was a 28-year-old female student of patient 1347 at an English language center. Nine people in close contact with this female student were quarantined. Eight primary, secondary, and high schools closed, 12 universities have been closed since 2 December until further notice, consequently approximately 8,200 pupils, 160,000 university students and 6,000 lecturers are off from schools and universities, all school exams, meetings, conferences, out-door activities have been cancelled or postponed, three residential areas with 148 households and 485 people are on temporary lockdown. In Hanoi, the authorities also requested suspension of unnecessary mass gathering events. After contact tracing for the latest four patients, the city has placed under supervision 861 close contacts (F1), 1,400 people exposed to F1 (F2) and 1,002 others. They have all tested negative for the virus, the HCDC announced on 7 December.

In the emergency meeting in response to the COVID-19 outbreak on 1 December in Hanoi, PM Nguyễn Xuân Phúc announced that international commercial flights would be halted and everyone entering the country would have to be quarantined in military barracks or local quarantine areas. Enterprise-managed quarantine was abolished after one person quarantined at a Vietnam Airlines facility spread COVID-19 to the community. From January 2021, foreigners will not be allowed to enter Vietnam to ensure safety for the major political event of the country, the 13th National Congress of the Communist Party.

On 9 December, following the instructions of the People's Committee of Ho Chi Minh City, the HCDC had conducted random COVID-19 testing at Mien Dong Coach Station to ensure that no infections are missed in the community. This is the largest bus station in Ho Chi Minh City in terms of the number of passengers transported each year and in terms of daily bus traffic.

On 26 December, a 32 years-old man known as patient 1440, live in Vinh Long Province has tested positive for the COVID-19 after illegally entering Vietnam. He was driven to a border gate in southern Vietnam two days ago then to Ho Chi Minh City, then got on a different bus to Vinh Long. Throughout his journey, he had made contact with several other people. On 28 December, four apartment blocks in District 5, Ho Chi Minh City were locked down after a man in the area tested positive. The 23-year-old man had stayed with patient 1440 in Myanmar before they crossed the Vietnamese border with other seven people. On 29 December, two more people in that group tested positive.

=== Third wave ===
==== January 2021 ====
On 2 January, Vietnam reported a detection of the UK variant of SARS-CoV-2 in a 45-year-old female, a resident of Tra Vinh province who returned from the United Kingdom on 22 December on flight VN50. All the 305 passengers from this flight were quarantined upon the arrival in Tra Vinh (147 people), Vinh Long (137 people), Can Tho (17 people) and Ho Chi Minh City (4 people). The patient is being treated at Tra Vinh Tuberculosis and Lung Disease Hospital with fever and sore throat. Full genome sequencing of the case revealed variant VOC 202012/01 that was reported from the UK, it was also discovered that this strain also had the D614G mutation, which is believed to spread rapidly in Da Nang 4–5 months ago. On 5 January, PM Phuc ordered to suspend flights from countries and territories infected with the new variant, the first two are South Africa and the United Kingdom.

On the same day, a 22-year-old man, known as patient 1498 left the quarantine facility before receiving positive result. Epidemiological investigation showed during the 14-day quarantine period, he had tested negative for the virus once. On 4 January, after completed isolation, his samples were taken for a second test, and without waiting for results, this person was released from the facility. Five family members picked him up by car and returned to Ha Long were subsequently quarantined and had their samples taken. The hotel where he and his family had stayed has been temporarily locked down while authorities also disinfected the nearby restaurant and car in which they traveled. Patient 1498 were put in quarantine at the 59th Infantry Regiment in Chuong My District from 21 December 2020 with 88 other people. This group of people was tested twice by Hanoi CDC. The first time, they tested negative for COVID-19. The second time, 84 negative samples returned on 3 January, 5 samples had no results. On January 4, Hanoi CDC returned the test results of the remaining 5 people, including patient 1498. However, the deputy director of Chuong My District Medical Center mistook the number of people with negative test results. So he signed an end of quarantine term with two negatives for all 89 people, instead of 84 people. This is the main reason why patient 1498 are allowed to end the quarantine period before the second test results are available.

In January 2021, Vietnamese government announced a stricter quarantine policy to "protect the country" during 2021 Lunar New Year. Everyone entering country must be isolated for at least 14-day at the government's quarantine facilities, only special diplomats identified as such by the Ministry of Foreign Affairs would be exempt. The Ministry of Defence ordered the military to bolster troop numbers along borders to prevent illegal entrants trying to enter the country through trails to avoid being quarantined, since a large number of Vietnamese working in neighboring countries are seeking to return home for Tết in many ways.

On 28 January, Vietnam Ministry of Health confirmed two community cases of COVID-19 in Hải Dương and Quảng Ninh. The first patient was a 34-year-old woman working for Vietnam Poyun Electronics in Hải Dương, she had come into close contact with another female worker who had been confirmed positive when arriving in Japan on 17 January. The second patient was a 31-year-old staff at the Van Don International Airport in Quảng Ninh, this airport has served many repatriation flights amid the pandemic. Both patients are treated at the National Hospital for Tropical Diseases in Hanoi. On the same day, the Japanese authorities announced the RT-PCR results of the 32-year-old girl imported from Vietnam on 17 January, according to the announcement, she had infected with the new coronavirus variant discovered in the UK. Vietnamese authorities are still unable to explain why she has this variant since she has never had contact with people infected with COVID-19. In the noon of 28 January, the country reported 84 new cases in Hai Dương and Quang Ninh, being the highest number of new cases in a day. These cases are all related to patients 1552 and 1553, who both came into close contact with a Hai Duong migrant worker diagnosed with the UK coronavirus variant by Japanese authorities. In response, all public transportation including flights cannot enter or leave northern Quang Ninh Province from 06:00, 28 January; while Hai Duong commenced province-wide social distancing measures six hours later.

The Health Ministry on 29 January ordered all medical facilities across the country to urgently testing for all healthcare workers amid the resurgence of COVID-19. Hospitals are also required to take samples of all patients in departments of emergency, emergency resuscitation, intensive care and random samples of at least 30% of patients in the remaining departments to early detect potential cases.

At a meeting on 31 January, Hanoi People's Committee announced the decision to close all bars, karaoke parlors, and discotheques, residents are required to avoid non-essential gatherings from 1 February. The city also tested people who traveled from Hai Duong Province's Chi Linh City from 1 January and Van Don International Airport from 5 January.

==== February 2021 ====
Third outbreak situation (by province)
13 cities and provinces	Situation	910 cases	Transmission stage (Note: WHO Transmission Assessment criteria: Stage 0: No transmission; Stage 1: Imported transmission; Stage 2: Localized community transmission; Stage 3: Large-scale community transmission)
Hải Dương	Mostly related to POYUN cluster. Source of infection for the first case who works at the company remains unknown. The majority of cases are in the province are came from the UK strains. However, one patient sample in Hai Duong city was infected with South African variant. The health sector is investigating why this variant appeared in the city.	726	2
Quảng Ninh	Under control. All cases linked with POYUN or Van Don International Airport.	61	2
Ho Chi Minh City	Basically under control. No cases reported for nearly two weeks. The city continued to conduct random testing in community.	36	2
Hanoi	Under a close monitoring. All three cluster related to Hải Dương and Quảng Ninh. However, the authorities found one deceased Japanese who never came into contact with any COVID patients, tested positive.	35	1
Gia Lai	Under control, no new case reported for a long period of time.	27	1
Bình Dương	Under control, no new case reported for a long period of time.	6	1
Bắc Ninh	Under control, no new case reported for a long period of time.	5	1
Hải Phòng	Under control, no new case reported for a long period of time.	4	1
Điện Biên	Under control, no new case reported for a long period of time.	3	1
Bắc Giang	Under control, no new case reported for a long period of time.	2	1
Hoà Bình	Under control, no new case reported for a long period of time.	2	1
Hưng Yên	Under control, no new case reported for a long period of time.	2	1
Hà Giang	Under control, no new case reported for a long period of time.	1	1

On 15 February, Hanoi CDC recorded one case was a deceased 53-year-old Japanese expert, his body was found inside Somerset West Point hotel room. The cause of death still unknown.

Initially, the government only quarantine the areas directly related to the infected people to limit the economic impact. But after half a month the outbreak still showed no signs of stopping, so on 15 February, entire province of Hai Duong was locked down for 15 days while Hanoi and Ho Chi Minh City stopped all entertainment activities across the city.

==== March 2021 ====
By 25 March 2021, Vietnam had 25 COVID-19 clusters related to the outbreaks, these are most notable five:

- Van Don International Airport cluster: appeared first with the first recorded case, he was a security officer known as "Patient 1553". From this case, Quang Ninh officials have tracked 4,395 contacts and took 1,252 samples, 13 are positive, all of the cases were from airport staffs. The source of the infection and when it started is unknown. Some experts assumed the source might be from people entering the airport. Right from the beginning of the pandemic, the airport became a specialized place for humanitarian flights from abroad. Therefore, this place has a very high chance of infection from immigrants. After detecting the case, Van Don airport stopped operating flights and conducted sterilization. Quang Ninh Province People's Committee also decided to lockdown Cai Rong for 21 days from 30 January after it registered infections linked to this cluster. The airport resumed commercial operations on 3 March.
- Dong Trieu town cluster: appeared a little later on 28 January. The leader of Quang Ninh province said, after the detection of a community infection in Dong Trieu town, they established a Quick Response Task Force, which mobilized 500 medical staff and students from medical schools to prevent the pandemic. The authorities traced 5,091 contacts and took 721 samples, 3 samples are positive. On 3 February, the town were locked down to contain the virus. By the end of 22 February, a total of 61 people in Quang Ninh were reported to have COVID-19, the authorities have been traced over 104,000 people had epidemiological factors with COVID-19 patients and tested more than 137,000 people.
- POYUN company cluster: The largest cluster. Of all 726 confirmed cases in the province, a majority linked here. By the morning of January 29, Hai Duong had collected a total of 1,936 samples at the company. The authorities of Chi Linh City moved more than 2,000 workers who are in quarantine at the company to six quarantine locations around the city. An onsite laboratory in Hai Duong has been established with initial capacity of testing of about 5,000 tests per day and can be increased as needed.
- Hai Duong city cluster: Most dangerous cluster. For just two days, the city recorded 26 cases including 11 cases that were not isolated. Patients have signs of onset and live in the community for a long time (about 3 weeks), epidemiology is complex and may still have many untraceable cases due to lack of information, which needs to be collected from patients even many of them are not cooperating. The majority of cases are in the province are came from the UK strains. However, one patient sample in the city was infected with South African variant. The health sector is investigating why this variant appeared.
- Tan Son Nhat International Airport cluster: Caused by A.23.1 variant, which first identified in Rwanda, Africa. On 6 February, HCDC detected two new positive cases are cargo handler at Tan Son Nhat airport and his brother, both of these cases were not related to an outbreak in Hai Duong. After received information, Binh Duong province's government quarantined an apartment where they live with more than 3,000 people in Vinh Phu ward, Thuan An city. Few days later, during tracing process, the authorities found that seven of his co-workers and 25 of their close contacts live in Ma Lang - the largest slum in the city and six other districts, were tested positive for coronavirus.

Since the third wave began, Vietnam recorded 910 cases in community in 13 cities and provinces. According to WHO, a total of more than 14 million people have been placed under quarantine since the beginning of the pandemic. On Lunar New Year's Eve 12 February, all provinces and cities stopped firing fireworks and New Year festivals to limit crowds (except for Hanoi still had one fireworks display spot at Thống Nhất Park, instead of 30 as planned).

On 2 March, both Hanoi and Ho Chi Minh City were allowed most non-essential services to reopen except bars, dance clubs, karaoke parlors, gyms and pool table. With the COVID-19 outbreaks gradually being brought under control, Hải Dương province lifted restrictions in few areas on 3 March, after 15 days of stringent province-wide lockdown measures. Expect for the four localities including: Hải Dương City, Kinh Môn town, Cẩm Giàng and Kim Thành District still have to follow social-distancing order until 17 March.

The Consular Department under the Ministry of Foreign Affairs confirmed there will be 13 repatriation flights scheduled from 5 to 14 March to bring back over 3,800 Vietnamese stuck abroad after nearly two months of suspension to prevent new coronavirus variants.

As Cambodia entered the third wave of infection, Vietnam in March recorded a rapid increase in the number of imported cases in the border provinces. Border forces have increased their number of troops and continuously patrolled to prevent illegal border entrants.

From 11 March 2020, Hanoi will conduct mass community testing to detect COVID-19 cases in the community early, particularly in high-risk areas like restaurants, coach stations, factories or areas where many foreigners reside. According to the city's health department, the tests will be conducted first in residential areas in Nam Tu Liem district and An Khanh Industrial Zone in Hoai Duc district on 11 March and 12 March. People in other districts will be tested from 15 to 19 March. Meanwhile, the city reopened relic sites and tourist attractions on 8 March; and pedestrian streets around Hoan Kiem Lake on 12 March.

On the evening of 25 March, a Chinese man living in Thuan An City, Binh Duong Province took the COVID test to go to Cambodia, tested positive for SARS-CoV-2. This man has passed the Moc Bai border gate and may contacted with some Cambodians. A few hours later, the Ministry of Health issued an emergency announcement after detected two people positive with COVID-19 flew from Phu Quoc International Airport to Hanoi. One person in close contact with these people also gave a positive result in Ho Chi Minh City. Amid the complex developments of the COVID-19 pandemic, border guards of the northern province of Lào Cai have worked with Chinese counterparts to strengthen patrols along the border. Vietnamese and Chinese border forces have set up nine joint teams to prevent cross-border crimes and illegal immigration.

==== April 2021 ====
In only two weeks, Cambodia had 4,832 new cases, mainly in the community. The epidemic has spread to 20/25 provinces and cities of this country. The Cambodian government has lockdown the capital Phnom Penh and many of its provinces from 15 April.

Kien Giang province has 12 districts and three cities that share a border with Cambodia, a total length of 56 km, a coastline of more than 200 km long with over 63,000 km2 of sea surface, thousands of fishing boats of the two countries operating every day. Kien Giang has two land border gates, five seaports and two airports. Authorities fear the cross-border transmission via illegal entrants will trigger a fourth wave in Vietnam. As a result, the Ministry of Health identified Kien Giang as a high-risk locality, especially the border area in Ha Tien town. The Minister instructed Cho Ray Hospital to send experts to directly support Ha Tien General Hospital to improve local treatment capacity, especially for severe cases that require ICU (intensive care unit) and ECMO, while Pasteur Institute of Ho Chi Minh City works with localities to support the establishment of testing laboratories in Ha Tien and the Provincial General Hospital to improve on-site testing capacity. The force of doctors involved in assisting Kien Giang includes 13 people, including specialists in resuscitation, artificial kidneys, infection control. The group also has doctor Tran Thanh Linh - deputy director of emergency resuscitation department at Cho Ray hospital, who has been sent to support in many COVID-19 hotspots such as Da Nang, Gia Lai.

On the Cambodia and Laos border, many provinces has implemented drastic measures to prevent and control epidemic such as: strengthening tight control at border gates, trails, open paths. The Border Guard Command has established 118 more posts, bringing the total number of border control posts to 1,798, which served by more than 11,300 soldiers. At sea there is also a patrol force consisting of nine ships and two boats of the Border Guard, Fisheries Surveillance, and Coast Guard. A few days later the reinforcement from the Command of Naval Region 5 of the Vietnam People's Navy has sent more ships to patrol key areas, using radar to detect any boats coming from Cambodia. The 4th Coast Guard Region Command, has also sent 32 boats to the region. Kien Giang province has developed a plan to establish a 300-500 beds field hospital in Ha Tien City, and establish a treatment area for severe COVID-19 patients at Ha Tien City Medical Center. Speed up the completion of the new Kien Giang General Hospital and using the old provincial general hospital as a field hospital if the epidemic becomes more severe. Vietnam also donated $500,000 to Cambodia along with 800 ventilators, 2 million medical masks and 300,000 N95 masks. Vietnam's PM told Hun Sen that Hanoi is always ready to assist Cambodia in preventing the pandemic. This is one of the biggest aid from Vietnam to another countries in prevention against COVID-19.

From 20 February to 22 April, about 1,300 people entered through Ha Tien border gate, including 31 cases of illegal entry. In 14,000 test samples since the beginning of the pandemic, 38 positive cases were found, of which 18 patients were being treated at Ha Tien Medical Center. The number of isolators concentrated in the province is 303 people.

During an inspection of the epidemic prevention in Can Tho city on 26 April, the Ministry of Health requested the establishment of a regional field hospitals located in Can Tho to prepare all scenarios and resources to isolate and treat people entering the region from countries where the number of people with COVID-19 has been increasing. According to the city Department of Health, there are currently 20 public hospitals and 24 non-public hospitals. "The city has prepared for an emergency situation, if the full capacity of these hospitals is used, Can Tho will be able to receive and treat about 1,200 cases of COVID-19", Nguyen Phuoc Ton - Deputy director of the Department of Health of Can Tho said.

At the COVID-19 Steering Committee meeting, Chairman of the Ho Chi Minh City People's Committee Nguyễn Thành Phong said the city would not organize fireworks on Reunification Day. According to a previous plan, Ho Chi Minh City would hold a fireworks display on 30 April at 5 places. This is the second time Ho Chi Minh City cancelled the fireworks to ensure safety from COVID-19. During the last 2021 Lunar New Year holiday, Ho Chi Minh City also planned to hold a fireworks display at 8 places but was forced to cancel it in the end because of a COVID-19 outbreak.

On 27 April, Vietnam confirmed one case in from community transmission. Patient #2857 is a hotel receptionist who was infected by Indian experts quarantined at the hotel in Yên Bái Province since 18 April. The patient was hospitalized at the National Hospital for Tropical Diseases. Results of genetic sequencing at the National Institute of Hygiene and Epidemiology in Hanoi showed that four cases of COVID-19 in the group of Indian experts were from the Delta variant.

On 29 April, the Ministry of Health confirmed 45 new cases, including five from local transmission (four people from the same family in Hà Nam Province and one in Ho Chi Minh City). All had close contact with a 28-year-old man from Hà Nam Province (Patient #2899) who tested positive after finishing 14 days of mandatory quarantine. He had returned to Vietnam from Japan via Đà Nẵng International Airport on 7 April. He had been quarantined for 14 days in Đà Nẵng and tested negative for coronavirus three times before completing quarantine. Two days later, the country confirmed another 5 cases in Hà Nam, 3 cases in Hanoi and 2 cases in Hưng Yên, all related to patient #2899. The local authorities decided to quarantine Đạo Lý Commune to prevent the spread.

=== Fourth wave ===
==== Severe outbreak: May–September 2021 ====
Five main sources of infection in fourth wave in Vietnam
Source	Overview	Transmission stage (Note: WHO Transmission Assessment criteria: Stage 0: No transmission; Stage 1: Imported transmission; Stage 2: Localized community transmission; Stage 3: Large-scale community transmission)
Ho Chi Minh City (cluster epidemiology)	The epicenter in the fourth wave, first case was detected in a Christian mission, then from mission members spread throughout the city and southern provinces of Vietnam. As of August 2021, there were more than 200,000 cases in the community just in Ho Chi Minh City and 100,000 cases in other southern and central provinces related to the city.	3
National Hospital of Tropical Diseases (cluster epidemiology)	Was the most dangerous and the reason for most of the cases in Vietnam's northern localities. Basically under controlled as of July 2021	2
Đà Nẵng (cluster epidemiology)	The clusters related from the city of Da Nang includes Hà Nam province, New Phuong Dong discotheque, AMIDA salon then spread to many provinces. As of 19 May, the city had isolated all of the positive patients and their close contacts. The authorities expected that when the test results of all close contacts are available, there may be some new cases here.	2
Yên Bái	The source of infection is from Indian and Chinese experts, and then spread to Vinh Phuc and some other provinces. The authorities already took all the samples, and had the results of about two thirds of cases. According to the reports of the Ministry of Health, Yên Bái and its related clusters are basically under controlled.	1
Hải Dương	Under a close monitoring. Related to the illegal entrants from Laos. Only confirmed 30 cases.	1

Number of community cases in four most affected localities and Bắc Giang (where the epidemic is under controlled) for comparison

In May 2021, many small outbreaks, most of which unrelated to each other, were discovered in many localities. The five largest of them were the one in the northern province of Bắc Ninh and Bắc Giang, the central region city of Đà Nẵng, the Christian mission in Ho Chi Minh City and at a major hospital in Hanoi. Another notable feature of this wave is that because the disease had spread to many provinces in Vietnam, there were outbreaks in the same locality at the same time but from few another sources of infection, making difficult to trace and cut the chain of infection. According to the WHO, to prepare for a worse situation, the country had built 30 more field hospitals with a scale of 1,500 ICU beds and 30,000 non-ICU beds.

===== Clusters related to NHTD =====
National Hospital of Tropical Disease (NHTD) cluster: At the meeting of the Steering Committee for COVID-19 prevention in Hanoi on the afternoon of 4 May, Director of Hanoi Department of Health Trần Thị Nhị Hà received a report from the NHTD about a positive case of SARS-CoV-2 who is a doctor working at this hospital. The next day, the director of the hospital ordered COVID testing for all employees, workers, patients and family members at its two facilities. The hospital took samples from more than 800 medical staff and patients. The number of COVID-19 cases connected with this outbreak was 238, including: 90 cases at the hospital and 148 people in community.

Bắc Ninh cluster: Directly related to NHTD cluster with 1,725 cases. On 5 May, right after receiving information from the National Hospital of Tropical Diseases that there were two COVID-19 positive cases, Bac Ninh province urgently searched for close contacts and issued a notice in the province to find people who have been to the NHTD.

During the rapid screening test, the Bắc Ninh Department of Health discovered one positive case of COVID-19 known as patient 3055 in Mão Điền commune (Thuận Thành district). This case was treated at the NHTD from 24 April. While patient 3055 was being treated, on 26 April, a group of 18 people from Mao Dien commune came to visit the patient at the hospital. Few days later, six people in this group tested positive for COVID-19. These people also attended a wedding on 30 April in Mão Điền commune and this wedding turned into a superspreading event (SSEV). As of June, there have been cases of COVID-19 in every areas in the province and spreading to other localities.

At the end of June, the outbreak in Bắc Ninh was brought under control, there are three main clusters include:

- Bắc Ninh city with 719 cases, mostly related to AAC company with additional cases detected among staff of a lockdown area in Khắc Niệm District.
- Thuận Thành District was the first cluster in the province with 591 cases, the outbreak in here have been contained.
- Quế Võ cluster recorded 127 cases, source of transmission was identified mainly from Quế Võ Industrial Park.

K Hospital (National Cancer Hospital) cluster: The source of infection is from the NHTD cluster. On the morning of 7 May, 10 people at K Hospital, Tân Triều Branch (Thanh Trì District, Hanoi) had positive results for SARS-CoV-2 including four patients and six patients relatives. The hospital imposed lockdown all of its medical staff, workers, patients and their relatives at three facilities. From the initial 10 cases, as of 24 May, nearly 60 more cases have been recorded in the hospital. Hanoi and other provinces also recorded infections related to this cluster. On 14 June, the hospital lifted quarantine after 37 days and resumed its medical activities.

Bắc Giang cluster: Bắc Giang was the second epicenter in the fourth wave with 5,600 confirmed cases, the outbreak in here forced the authorities to quarantine four districts in the province and Bắc Giang city. According to the results of gene sequencing published by the Institute of Hygiene and Epidemiology, the cluster recorded the appearance of the Indian variant B.1.617.2.

On 8 May, the province confirmed a case was a female worker at Sin Young Vietnam factory located in Vân Trung Industrial Park, Việt Yên district - the province's largest industrial park where hundreds of thousands of workers come to work every day. She was infected after contact with COVID patients from the K Hospital cluster. Through testing, 75 more positive cases were found, most of them were workers in the same factory with her. Notably, the newly discovered cluster at Hosiden Vietnam Company (Quang Châu Industrial Park) has recorded a total of 660 cases (11% of its total employees). During the three days from 22 to 25 May, the medical authorities has focused on large-scale testing in high-risk areas, so the number of COVID-19 cases increased very quickly. Most of the newly discovered cases are the people who previously identified as close contacts. "The rate of close contacts (who used to be negative) becoming positive is very high. Particularly at Shin Young, the first infected company in Vân Trung industrial park, the rate was 79%. At Hosiden Company, the rate was 55%.", the representative of Bắc Giang province's health department said. In addition, the province also recorded three more medical staff infected while on duty. Bắc Giang Province's Steering Committee for COVID-19 Prevention and Control assessed that the cause of this may from cases at Vân Trung Industrial Park.

Deputy Minister of Health Nguyễn Trường Sơn said just on 25 May, the number of COVID-19 cases recorded in Bắc Giang was 375, three times higher than the previous record of the province's number of cases. That was from the test result of nearly 2,500 samples taken in quarantine areas in the province. According to Bắc Giang's COVID-19 situation report, the number of patients will certainly increase, because there are more than 50,000 high-risk samples have not been tested. With this large number of samples, Vietnam's minister of health Nguyễn Thanh Long has directed the medical staff to switch from pooled testing using RT-PCR to rapid testing to stamp out the epidemic faster. At the end of May, Bắc Giang established its largest field hospital located at the province's public stadium. At the same time, the province has completed the construction of the ICU sites with 158 beds.

Quang Châu and Vân Trung industrial zones are located very close to each other, next to the arterial road is the Hanoi - Bắc Giang expressway and two frontage roads running parallel to the highway. Those routes has hundreds of buses going to Lạng Sơn and the southern provinces stop to pick up passengers every day. Around the industrial park, there are hundreds of motels, markets and entertainment facility. Tens of thousands of workers in motels such as My Điền 1, My Điền 2, and My Điền 3 in Nếnh town, Việt Yên district, have been quarantined due to some worker live there infected with COVID-19. For prevention of a large scale outbreak, Bắc Giang decided to quarantined every people in Việt Yên district, where there are two industrial zones located from 15 May. Another cause for the rapid spread of the disease in industrial zones, according to the leaders of Bắc Giang province, is the Provincial Management Board of Industrial Parks and the Department of Health was too slow when detect and isolate infected workers at the beginning, especially at the outbreak in Vân Trung industrial park.

After nearly two months in lockdown, the situation in Bắc Giang continued to improve gradually with no new clusters being reported. During the end of June, on average around 194 cases were reported per day and mostly among the Quang Châu and Vân Trung Industrial Park workers who are in lockdown areas or have been in quarantine. More than 25,000 close contacts identified and tested. Given the stabilizing situation in the province, the outbreak control special unit has been dissolved and supported medical workforces have gradually decreased since the second week of June.

===== Clusters related to Đà Nẵng =====
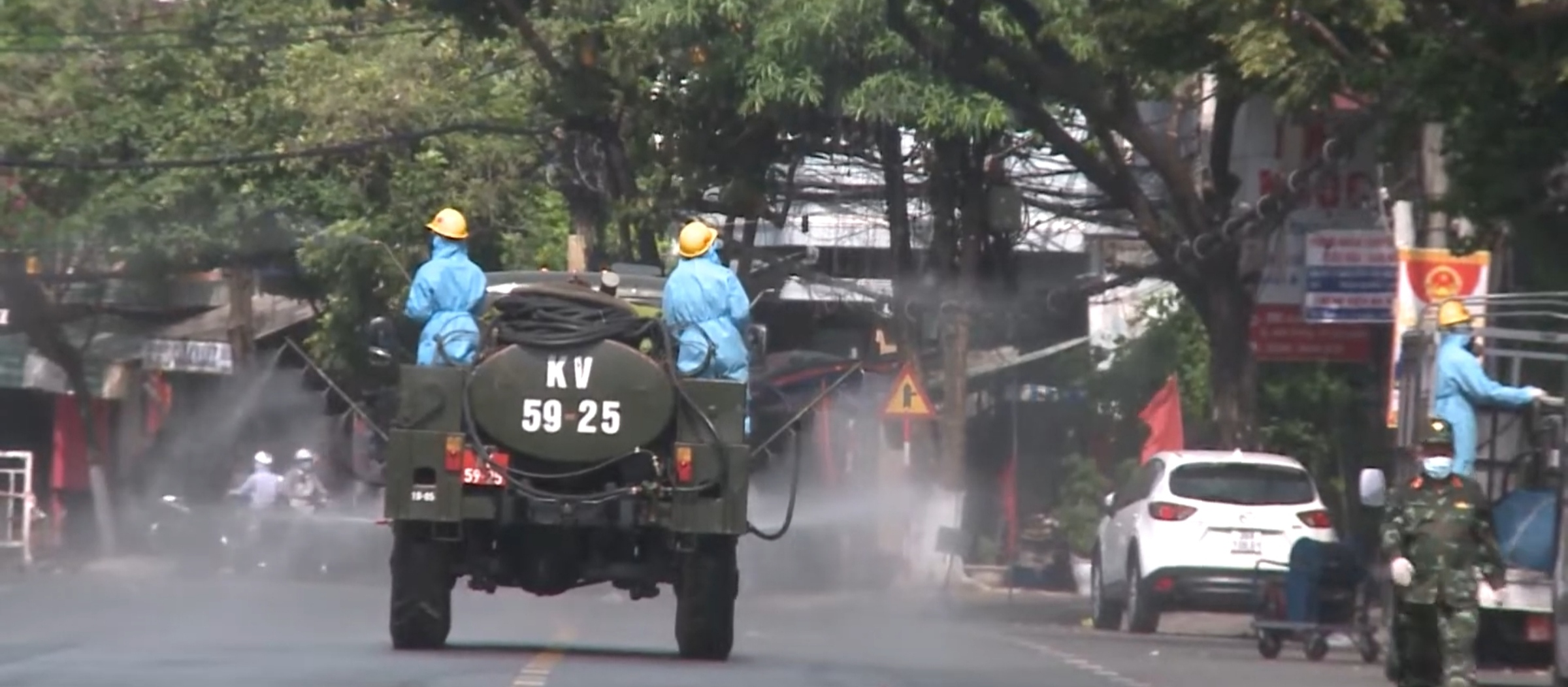
Chemical troops disinfecting a street in Đà Nẵng.

Hà Nam cluster: As of 3 August 2021, a total of 68 cases related to the Hà Nam outbreak have been recorded. Most of those cases related to patient #2899, who returned from Japan (also isolated at Đà Nẵng before) but did not self quarantine at home. On 3 August, the provincial government removed the last quarantine zone in Lý Nhân District.

Đà Nẵng cluster: As of 11 May, the city had 43 positive cases, and eight cases in six other localities, all related to New Phuong Dong discotheque, AMIDA salon and Phu An hotel. The first case was recorded on 3 May 2021 and the source of infection is unknown. Most of the cases from the cluster that were sequenced have been confirmed to have the B.1.1.7 variant.

In August, Đà Nẵng discovered two large clusters are Hòa Cường market and Thọ Quang fishing port. As of 21 August, the infection chain related to Thọ Quang fishing port and at the quarantine areas in Sơn Trà recorded 1,124 cases while Hòa Cường market chain is at "very high risk" with 699 patients. Of the 699 cases related to the market, 217 are traders, 37 are buyers and 445 close contacts. After nine days, the disease in here had spread to seven districts in Đà Nẵng. Epidemiological investigation shows that one F0 can infect eight other people in three days, leading to a rapid increase in the number of cases. Chairman of the People's Committee of Đà Nẵng Lê Trung Chinh signed a decision to extend the time of social distancing and asked people to self-isolate themselves until 26 August.

===== Clusters related to Ho Chi Minh City =====
On 26 May, a positive case linked to a Christian mission was discovered in Gò Vấp District. Five days after the initial three cases, the city recorded another 133 cases in 21 of the city's 22 districts. As a first step, the administration of Ho Chi Minh City raised the anti-epidemic level on 31 May by putting Gò Vấp District and Thạnh Lộc Ward in District 12 under lockdown and imposing social distancing for the other areas in the city. During first 15 days of lockdown, the city set up 38 checkpoints surrounding Gò Vấp, effectively controlling the infection chain linked to the mission, which had approximately 6 hundred cases. However, when screening at several hospitals showed more cases, numerous more clusters were identified in the area. On 14 June, the disease had spread to hospitals, industrial parks, and residential neighborhoods, with approximately a thousand cases reported; the city therefore had to maintain social distancing for another two weeks. However, the number of daily new COVID-19 cases in the city showed no sign of decreasing. In response to this, the city People's Committee implemented Directive 10 on 20 June. Ho Chi Minh City, which ranked third in the country at the time, had over 1,500 cases. Directive 10 mandates that non-essential business services, spontaneous marketplaces, and public passenger transportation must be halted and no more than three individuals may gather in public spaces with the minimum distance of 1.5 meters. On 9 July, when the number of community infections in Ho Chi Minh City reached more than ten thousand, the government decided to lock down the entire city for 15 days.

In addition to distancing and blockade measures, the city has increased testing in order to track down unidentified cases in the community. During the Christian mission outbreak, the health sector increased testing capacity to a hundred thousand per day. Over 3 hundred thousand workers in industrial parks and manufacturing areas were sampled. From 26 June to 5 July, as the epidemic spread, the city continued to increase its capacity to half a million samples per day in order to test 5 million people in its districts and in Thủ Đức city. The city also held the largest vaccination campaign. The city injected 836 thousand doses of vaccine transferred by the Ministry of Health in just five days (19–24 June). HCMC has set up 96 injection sites in all of its districts and over 300 mobile injection sites in industrial zones. According to the city's Department of Health, they had enough oxygen supply for 50,000 cases scenario.

In July 2021, Trần Đắc Phu, an advisor to the Vietnam Public Health Emergency Operations Center, said that "the outbreak [in Ho Chi Minh City] remains complicated". He did not make a prediction about the epidemic in Ho Chi Minh City because of "many variables" and "the situation depends a lot on the implementation of epidemic prevention measures". He said that the disease was spreading quickly to many provinces because Ho Chi Minh City is the primary economic centre of the country. In some localities, the epidemic was spread by long-distance drivers. Many patients are infected with the Delta variant so their close contacts quickly become positive. The number of new cases is up to hundreds per day, showing that the epidemic has been spreading widely into the community, making the outbreak in Ho Chi Minh City and the southern provinces difficult to predict. The Ho Chi Minh City People's Committee in a meeting on 14 July recorded the number of COVID-19 deaths in the city in the fourth wave to 130, four times the number announced by the Ministry of Health. Due to large number of patients, all close contacts of coronavirus cases are self-isolated at home to reduce the overload at local quarantine facilities. The health ministry has also allowed mild COVID-19 cases to have their treatment time shortened and be discharged early, which also helps lighten the load.

On 16 August, the Ministry of Health piloted a "home-based care" program for positive cases in the city. The program is implemented with 3 main activities, including: take samples for testing at home, providing medicine boxes and a number of health-promoting products, and at the same time supporting health counseling, provide food packages for infected people and their family members to stay at home, reducing the risk of spread. The Ministry of Health also provides detailed guidance documents for F0s, teaching them to self-care, monitor their health and contact medical facilities in case of severe symptoms. On 24 August, the Ho Chi Minh City Military High Command worked with the People's Committee and finished preparing 10 hectares of land with 5,000 graves and an additional 5 hectares for mass burial if the crematoriums in the city were overloaded. The High Command also requested the minister of defence to provide additional 4,000 body bags. At the meeting, military officials said that the death rate in the field hospital was 2.56%, 94.2% in the ICU center, and 3.42% with home treatment.

Christian mission cluster: The cluster at Revival Ekklesia Mission had more than 520 cases in Hồ Chí Minh City and six other provinces. In addition, six other large clusters with hundreds of cases in the city are linked to it. Among the cases are 40 members of the mission, who had gathered in a small alley in Gò Vấp District several times. The first cases, likely the source of the outbreak linked to the mission, showed symptoms on 13 May. This person had gone to Hanoi and returned to Ho Chi Minh City on 29 April. The HCDC had tested more than 151 thousand people linked to the outbreak. On 27 May, the National Steering Committee for COVID-19 Prevention and Control requested a suspension of foreign arrivals into the city and imposed social distancing from 31 May. After just six days, 20 out of 22 districts and Ho Chi Minh City's key industrial parks had COVID-19 cases. Due to their characteristics, industrial parks cannot shift to online work while ventilation conditions in many workplaces is limited. In addition, many workers share means of transport and live together in crowded hostels, which are the main factors allowing the disease to spread more easily. "Ho Chi Minh City has 1.6 million workers; if the disease is not well controlled, it will cause a health crisis," Minister Long emphasized.

Regarding the source of infection, 55% of patients are infected from religious activities, 25% at work, 15% from family, and 5% from their friends. Thus, except for the infection from the activities of the mission, the risk of infection in workplaces is quite high, especially in a closed environment like an office building.

Other major clusters in the city: On 2 July, the Ho Chi Minh City Department of Health confirmed the city had recorded many major infection chains, involving companies, shops, hospitals and markets. Major cases were recorded at the Nidec Sankyo factory (238 cases), Phạm Ngọc Thạch Hospital, which was treating TB and HIV patients (25 cases), the Hóc Môn wholesale market (58 cases), Bình Điền market (56 cases) and Chí Hòa Prison (81 cases). In Chí Hòa, the death of a prisoner from COVID-19 has sparked a prison riot.

In addition, the city also detected 48 COVID-19 patients through screening at 30 hospitals and clinics. These cases came from small clusters, such as the one at the Hóc Môn mechanical workshop, the Ehome apartment building, and the residential area in Thủ Đức, recently discovered in the community. According to the director of the Ho Chi Minh City Department of Health, the origin of these infections may be due to the disease that has been silently spreading in the community before, from people who have been in contact with infected person or they had travelled through endemic areas but not declared health status. Notably, when Ho Chi Minh City Hospital for Tropical Diseases tested RT-PCR for 887 employees on 13 June, it recorded 53 positive cases with COVID-19. These people had previously received two doses of the AstraZeneca COVID-19 vaccine. The hospital worked with the Oxford University Clinical Research Unit to monitor the clinical progress and SARS-CoV-2 viral load of these positive cases to assess the effectiveness of the vaccine. After studying 62 infected employees of the Ho Chi Minh City Hospital of Tropical Diseases, the expert team concluded that their SARS-CoV-2 viral load was 251 times higher than Wuhan strain, but much lower than unvaccinated patients. The study also found that a highly transmissible variant, along with a poorly ventilated atmosphere and the failure to wear a mask in the office made it easier for the virus to spread among these people.

On 2 September, District 7 and Củ Chi District declared that the epidemic in here was under control. These are the first two localities of Ho Chi Minh City successfully brought F0 out of the community, limited the number of new cases and have a high rate of COVID-19 vaccine coverage in the community.

Bình Dương cluster: Since the fourth wave of COVID-19 broke out, the total of cases in this local is over 16,000 (11% of total cases in Vietnam), mainly in hostels, companies and industrial parks. The number of cases began to increase rapidly after the couple selling milk tea in Thủ Dầu Một City tested positive in mid-June. Because 11 close contacts related to this couple were workers in factory in Tân Uyên town and Thuận An city, so health official expanded testing in industrial zones and detected an average of 10 to 20 people tested positive in there for ten consecutive days. After 24 June, from nearly 30 cases a day, the rate of infections skyrocketing. The days recorded high numbers of cases such as: 30 June (81 cases), 1 July (90 cases), 4 July (87 cases), 5 July (114 cases), 6 July (92 cased) and 7 July (140 cases). After 13 days of extensive testing for more than 1.2 million people, the results detected 12,284 people with COVID-19 (rate of positive tests is 1%). Throughout the pandemic, Bình Dương detected 46 clusters, mostly from the infection chain in Ho Chi Minh City with the Delta variant. Of which, 42 clusters have not been controlled, including: 20 in the province, 10 directly connected with the outbreak in Ho Chi Minh City and 12 with unknown sources of infection (detected through rapid testing in medical facilities). Binh Duong has a population of 2.5 million and is one of the largest industrial centers in the Southern Region with nearly 50,000 businesses and more than 1.2 million employees. Many hostels are located near to factories and businesses. Therefore, according to the Department of Health, pathogens came from dormitories to companies and factories, then from workers spread to other dormitories, forming large outbreaks. The Department of Health of Bình Dương province said that among the current outbreaks, the most dangerous clusters is the one in Tân Phước Khánh ward, Tân Uyên town and at the company in Bình Chuẩn ward, Thuận An City. The disease prevention in the locality is difficult because the province has many industrial parks, hostels with a large number of workers from all over the country come here every day.

Phú Yên cluster: Phú Yên is the central region province recorded the fastest infection rate, just from eight cases on the morning of 24 June, after 14 days the number of cases increased to 359, of which one person died. Nguyễn Thị Mộng Ngọc, Director of the province's Department of Health, said the province has identified three main sources of infection. The first source is from "patient 13690", 53 years old, the owner of a restaurant in Tuy Hòa City (infected from a driver came from Hồ Chí Minh City). The second is from "patient 16052" in Đông Hòa town and the third is from "patient 15541" who used to be treated in Hồ Chí Minh City. According to the director, the locality lacking human resources and medical equipment to meet the needs of tracing and taking samples for testing, and must seek support from other localities. The province's health sector has no experience in epidemic prevention while the number of cases in the community is in large numbers.

===== Clusters with unknown source of infection =====
Điện Biên cluster: On 14 May, Nậm Pồ district, Điện Biên province recorded the first COVID-19 case, was a female employee working in a boarding school for ethnic minorities. After one week, the cluster number of cases in here increased to 40. Most of the cases of COVID-19 are teachers and primary school students, resulting in their family members being infected as well. The source of infection of the first case has yet to be identified. By mid-June, this cluster was determined to be under control after 26 days without new cases in the community.

T&T company and Times City cluster: In the fourth wave, there a total of 171 community cases have been reported from 20/30 districts in Hanoi. At the beginning of the outbreak, most of the cases were linked with hospitals cluster and related to Đà Nẵng (47 cases), but in late May the authorities discovered a cluster with unknown source of infection at T&T company and Park 11 Times City apartment complex. This is a dangerous cluster because the patients have been infected for a long time, have moved to many places and came into contact with many people. On 23 May, the Hanoi Center for Disease Control announced a case positive for COVID-19 who was a student at Vinschool Primary School. Later, when testing this patient's family members including father, mother and younger brother, the results were also positive. Although the first case was detected in the Park 11 building, through preliminary assessment from public health units, it is possible that the outbreak originated from the T&T company, not from the family living in Park 11.

Thanh Xuân Trung cluster: This cluster started from the first two patients in alley 330 Nguyen Trai at the end of August. After seven days of extensive testing, the health sector recorded an additional 388 positive cases residing in two alleys 328, 330 and other nearby apartments.

This cluster was identified by the leaders of the Center for Disease Control (CDC) in Hanoi as having reached the 2nd or 3rd infection cycle. The two alleys are old residential areas with a high population density and an unsanitary environment, which has resulted in a large number of cases despite quarantine efforts. Thanh Xuan District has moved nearly 1,200 people to isolation facilities in Hoa Lac. On the evening of 1 September, they began to evacuate people from the area.

Sa Đéc General Hospital cluster: The total number of cases in the province is 305 and 3 deaths. According to Đồng Tháp Department of Health, the first patient is female, living in Tân Khánh Trung commune, Lấp Vò district. This person was hospitalized at Sa Đéc General Hospital from 10 June due to an abscess in the shoulder. On 23 June, the patient showed signs of fever and fatigue. The next day, she was sampled and tested positive for SARS-CoV-2. The source of this case has not been identified so far. Until 5 July, Đồng Tháp had recorded many clusters of COVID-19, of which there were 110 cases at Sa Đéc General Hospital, Garment Factory 6 has 14 cases, Agribank in Châu Thành district has 49 cases. Châu Thành is the province's hot spot with 103 cases, of which the highest concentration of cases is in An Hiệp and Tân Nhuận Đông communes.

==== Cases plateau: October 2021–present ====
After recording a decrease in the number of COVID-19 cases and deaths, many localities have adjusted to loosen social distancing. In Ho Chi Minh City, after 4 months of applying strict "social distancing" measures to curb the pandemic, the city eased restrictions from the evening of 30 September 2021. Most businesses like malls, food establishments for takeaways, financial and legal institutions, hospitality facilities, and offices may reopen. More than 143,000 workers have returned to Ho Chi Minh City, Đồng Nai to work. In Đồng Nai province, as of 15 October, about 82% of businesses have resumed operations. The outbreak in here and related restrictions on movement have impacted its manufacturing-led economy, forcing the closure of factories.

On 11 October, the Ministry of Health changed the criteria for assessing the level of epidemic, replacing the directives that were used before.

Epidemic level criteria
Community case/100,000 inhabitants Vaccination rate	0 - < 20	20 - < 50	50 - < 150	≥ 150
≥ 70% of total population (over 18 years old)	Level 1	Level 1	Level 2	Level 3
< 70% of total population (over 18 years old)	Level 1	Level 2	Level 3	Level 4

From mid-October through December 2021, Ho Chi Minh City began to close its field hospitals. The city would prioritize closing field hospitals set up at schools and dorms so that children may return to school. On 16 October, the administration of Ho Chi Minh City closed the No. 1 Field Hospital at the Vietnam National University dorms. On the same day, Đà Nẵng officially allowed the services industry to reopen, with restaurants and bars re-opening after nearly half a year of closure.

Phú Thọ cluster: Since 13 October, the northern province of Phú Thọ has recorded 292 cases in the community from two clusters in Lam Thao - Chu Hoa, Bach Hac - Phu Ninh. It's possible that the outbreak in Lam Thao started at the district health center. After tracing, infected cases were found scattered in all communes and towns. The province had set up 280 ICU beds and implemented a vaccination campaign for the entire Lam Thao district with 30,000 doses. At the time of the outbreak, the rate of adults receiving one dose of vaccine was over 85% , however, the rate of people receiving two doses was just about 0.5%.

According to the Ministry of Health, the majority of deaths are people with underlying diseases and the elderly, of which 85% have not been vaccinated. In January 2022, the country recorded more than 2 million cases and over 36,000 deaths, accounting for 1.7% of the total number of cases. Compared to the peak of the epidemic in August–September 2021 period, the number of severe cases decreased by two-thirds. The number of deaths from 300 to 350 per day went down to more than 200. By the end of December 2021, in numerous regions, including Ho Chi Minh City and An Giang, the majority of the deaths were the elderly with underlying conditions, of which 85% had not been vaccinated or had not received two doses of vaccine. People over 65 years old accounted for roughly 48% of fatalities; 50–56 years old accounted for 36%; 18–49 years old accounted for 15%; and those aged 0–17 years old accounted for 0.42%.

Medical personnel have concentrated on protecting COVID-19 patients with underlying disorders, prescribing antiretroviral medications to them even when they are showing no symptoms. As a result, the number of deaths fell to less than 20 cases each day, especially in Ho Chi Minh City.

Since the end of April 2021, Vietnam experienced "a fast-spreading outbreak" of over 700,000 cases. Clusters were found in Bac Giang province industrial parks and at least ten major hospitals throughout the country. According to the WHO, Vietnam has built over 30 field hospitals with 1,500 ICU beds and 30,000 non-ICU beds. When total cases reached several thousand per day, the government locked down Southern Vietnam and Hanoi. On 26 July 2021, for the first time in Vietnam's disease prevention history, Ho Chi Minh City imposed a daily 6:00 pm curfew; no one could leave the city, and only emergency services were permitted to operate. The National Assembly authorised the central government on 28 July to implement local emergency measures to curb the pandemic. On 20 August, Nguyễn Thành Phong was dismissed by the Politburo as chair of the People's Committee of Ho Chi Minh City. The government also moved 10,000 troops into the city to enforce the lockdown and deliver food. A main cause of the outbreak was a four-day holiday for Reunification Day and International Workers' Day, during which many vacation destinations were packed with travelers. DNA sequencing indicated that the SARS-CoV-2 Delta variant dominated this wave, particularly in central and southern Vietnam.

On 29 August 2021, Prime Minister Phạm Minh Chính stated that Vietnam might have to live with the virus and could not rely on indefinite closures and quarantines. This marked a major change in the country's approach to COVID-19, forcing Vietnam to accelerate its vaccination campaign to control the pandemic. The number of new cases began to fall to several thousand per day in mid-September, and restrictions were eased. Vietnam recorded its first case of the Omicron variant in December, leading to a significant new wave of infections going into the first months of 2022, with the highest 7-day average of 217,164 cases recorded on 13 March. However, due to the country's widespread vaccination coverage, deaths remained low in proportion to the number of confirmed cases.

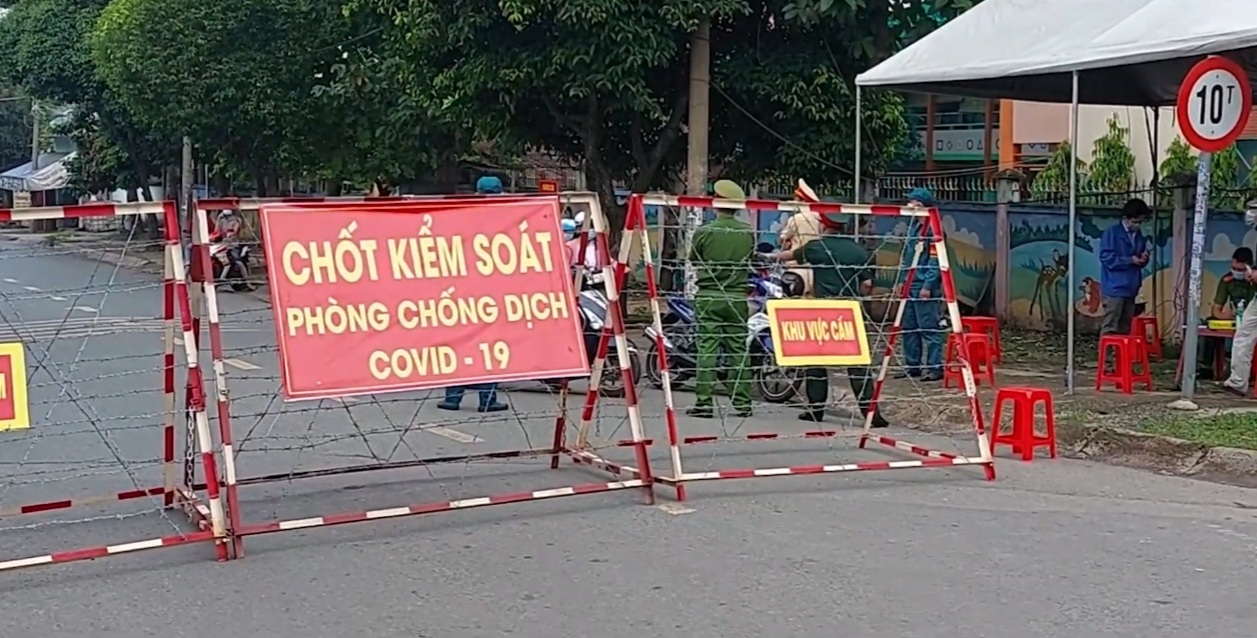
A road blockade during the 2021 outbreak in Ho Chi Minh City.

In March 2022, Prime Minister Phạm Minh Chính declared COVID-19 to be "endemic" and considered ending daily reporting of new cases. An article in Bloomberg noted that Vietnam has a high level of vaccination and has seen a dramatic drop in COVID-19 related deaths. However, in August, the Ministry of Health issued a recommendation to not declare COVID-19 endemic, and to instead shift the country's response from "prevention" to "stable management".

In June 2023, Prime Minister Phạm Minh Chính stated that COVID-19 no longer constituted a severe transmissible disease, leaving the jurisdiction of future COVID-19 prevention and classification to the Ministry of Health. The National Steering Committee for COVID-19 Prevention and Control was dissolved on 29 October 2023, after three years working to contain the pandemic. Two days later, the Vietnam Ministry of Health published their last COVID-19 daily report.
