= Da Nang Women's Hospital =

Hospital in Vietnam

Geography
- Location: 26C Chu Văn An, Bình Hiên, Hải Châu, Da Nang, Vietnam
- Coordinates: 16.057384°N 108.217800°E

Links
- Lists: Hospitals in Vietnam

Đà Nẵng Women's Hospital is the third largest hospital in the Vietnamese city of Đà Nẵng, behind Đà Nẵng Hospital, and Đà Nẵng C Hospital.
