= Bến Thành Market =

Market in Ho Chi Minh City, Vietnam

- Chợ Bến Thành, Chợ Mới
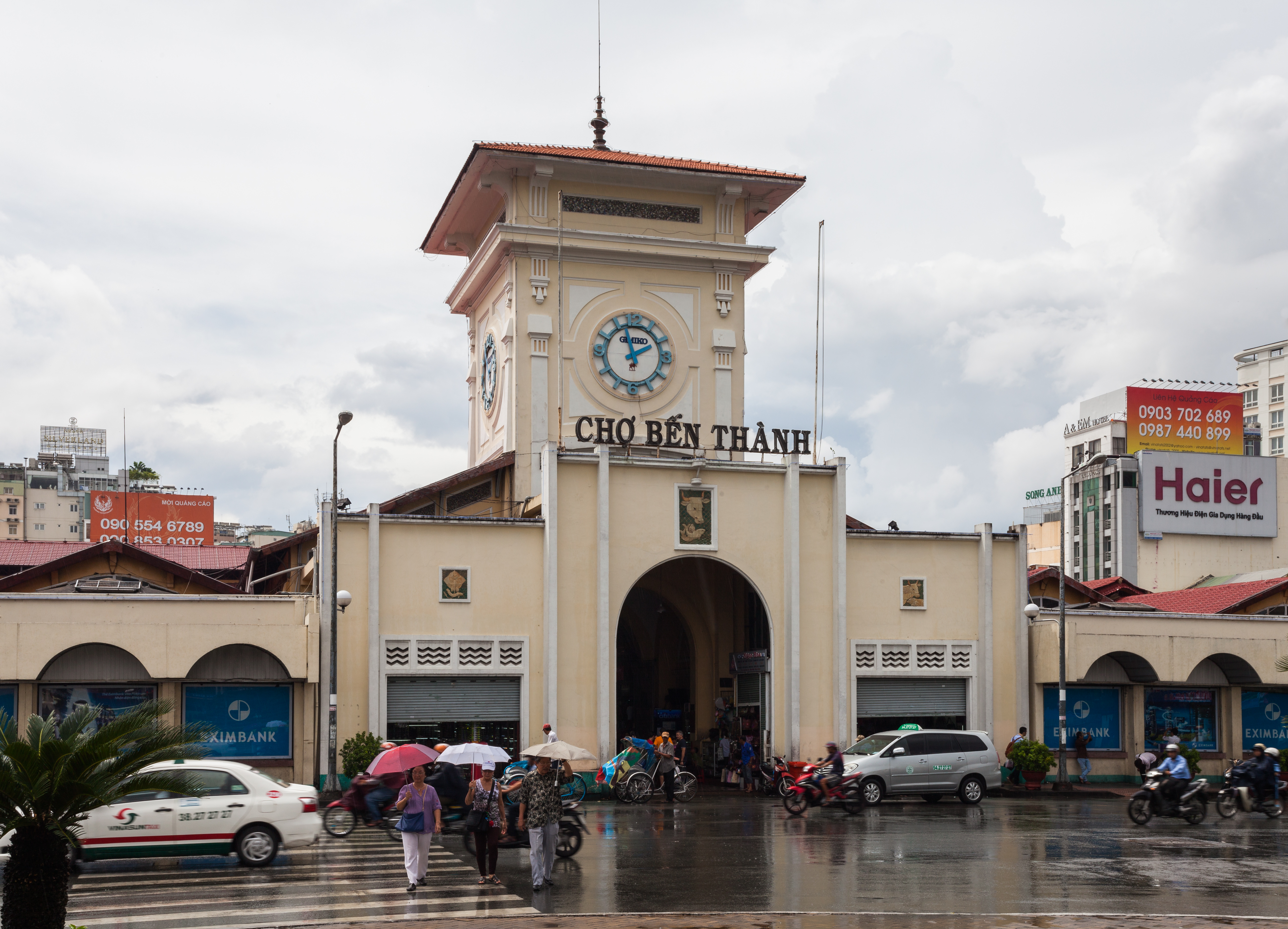
- Iconic clock tower of the Bến Thành Market
- Interactive map of the Bến Thành Market area
- Alternative names: New Market

General information
- Type: Market
- Location: Quách Thị Trang Square, Bến Thành, District 1, Ho Chi Minh City, Vietnam
- Coordinates: 10°46′21″N 106°41′53″E
- Current tenants: 6,000 (Approx)
- Construction started: 1912
- Completed: 1914; 112 years ago
- Renovated: 1952, 1985, 2022

Technical details
- Floor area: 13,056 m²

Design and construction
- Architect: French
- Main contractor: Brossard et Maupin

Renovating team
- Architect: Lê Văn Mậu (1952)
- Renovating firm: TA Landscape (2022)

Other information
- Public transit: L1 L2 L4 Ben Thanh station

Bến Thành Market (Vietnamese: Chợ Bến Thành) is located in the center of Ho Chi Minh City (Saigon), Vietnam in District 1. The market is one of the earliest surviving structures in the city and an important symbol of the city. Ben Thanh Market is a famous destination for many local and foreign tourists from all around the world. The market operates all year round and opens at around 6am every day until the official closing time at 6pm. After 6pm, the day market transitions into a night market which runs until 10pm.

Today, Ben Thanh Market welcomes more than 10,000 visitors per day to shop and visit. The market has nearly 1,500 booths with more than 6,000 small businesses selling wholesale and retail items from consumables to luxury goods.

== Location ==
Ben Thanh Market is situated in the center of Ho Chi Minh in Bến Thành Ward, District 1. The market is located on an intersection of four busy streets. The main entrance is the Southside on Lê Lợi Boulevard/Quách Thị Trang Square, the Northside on Lê Thánh Tôn, the Eastside on Phan Bội Châu and the Westside on Phan Châu Trinh.

The market was originally structured to be near the Saigon River, formerly called as Bến Nghé River, next to Citadel of Saigon (or Gia Định). As a former floating market, the surrounding canals offered the convenience for boats to pick up and drop off items for trade. After being relocated in 1912 near the Mỹ Tho railway station (currently the Saigon bus station), the market possesses one of the most optimal locations in District 1.

== Architecture ==
Ben Thanh market has a total area of 13,056 m². The 100-year-old building has a unique French Indochinese design that stands out among the modern and contemporary buildings around Saigon center. Throughout the years, the market underwent major renovations to both the exterior and interior, but the overall architecture remained with its iconic bell tower in the foreground.

Since the building was constructed by french Etablissements BROSSARD & MOPIN around the time of the French Colonial Era, the building holds strong French influence. Khuong Van Muoi, President of the city Architects’ Association, said the build adopted some of its unique features from French architects. He mentions the orientation of the building and banners along the roof that extends over the market to provide shade. These designs were integrated specifically for natural air-conditioning.

== History ==
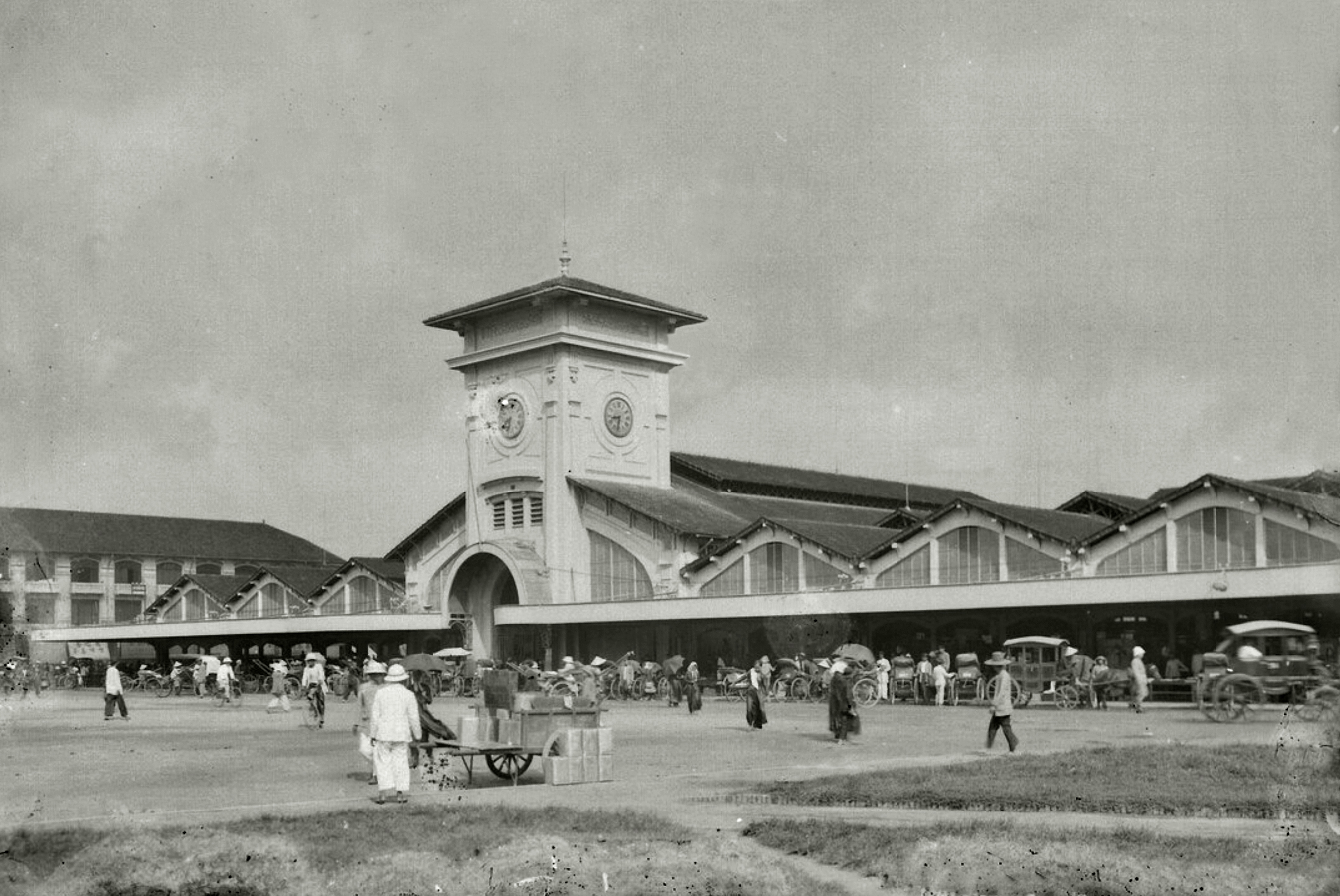
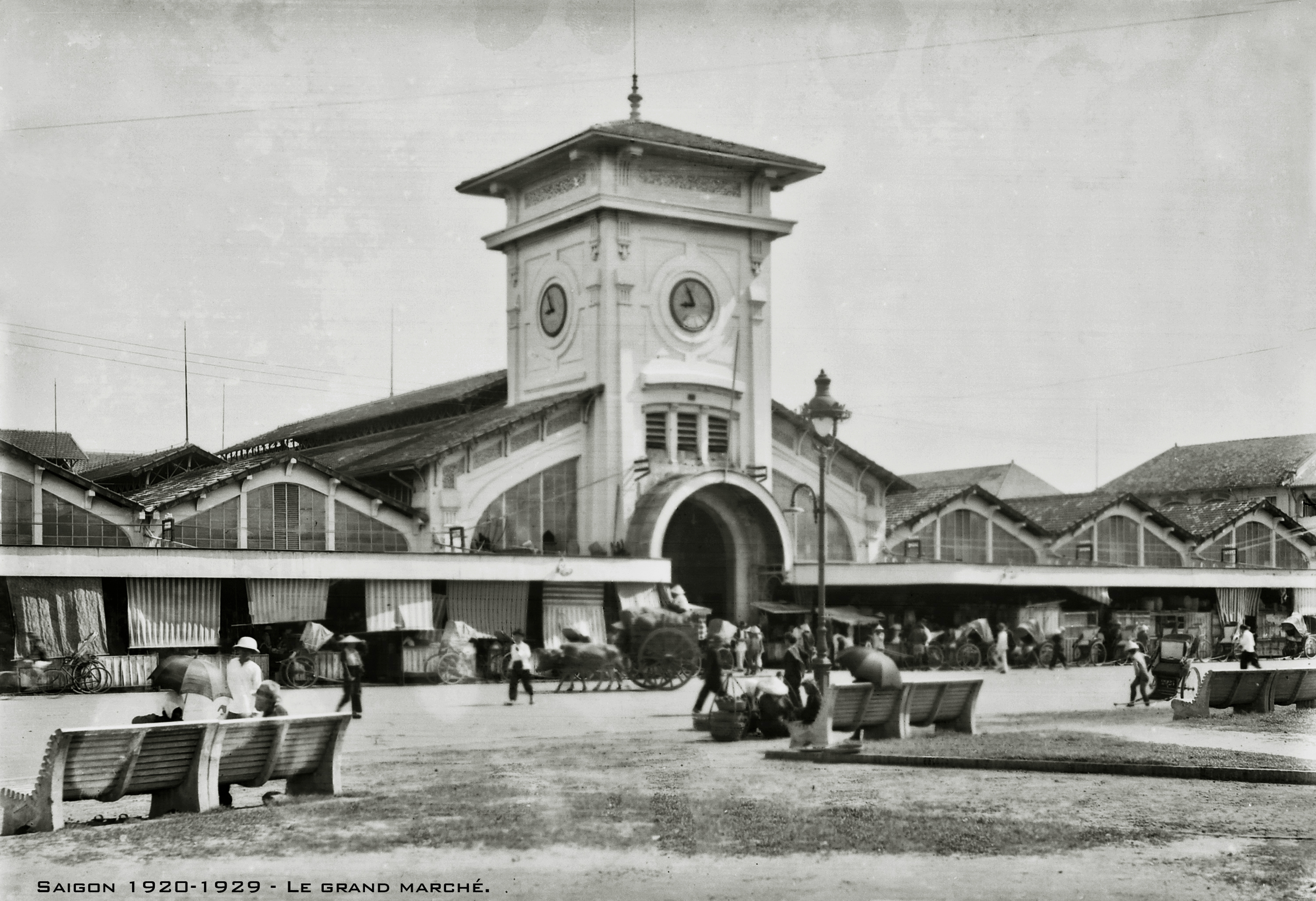
Views of the new Bến Thành Market in the 1920s

=== French colonial era ===
The market developed from informal markets created by early 17th-century street vendors gathering together near the Saigon River. The market was formally established by the French colonial powers after taking over the Gia Định citadel in 1859 (see Citadel of Saigon). This market was destroyed by fire in 1870 and rebuilt to become Saigon's largest market. In 1912 the market was moved to a new building and called the new Bến Thành Market to distinguish over its predecessor. The building was renovated in 1985.

The original market started out in the early 17th century as an informal wet market founded by local street vendors. When the neighboring Gia Dinh citadel was overthrown by French imperialists in 1859, the market was properly constructed and declared a formal establishment along French Colonial lines. The original structure included a wooden thatched roof which would later be destroyed by fire in 1870 was rebuilt to become called "Les Halles Centrales".

In 1912, the market was moved into the building people are familiar with today, using fireproof metal structure to become the largest and most central of the markets in the city. When all the vendors moved into the new market building the old building was not demolished but instead transitioned to a wholesale market known as the Old Market or Chợ Cũ, which is now on the Nguyễn Huệ Boulevard. As for the new market, the name changed to Bến Thành Market to be distinguished from its predecessor. The name Bến Thành derives from the words "harbor" (Bến) and "citadel" (Thành).

=== Modern ===
In 1985 the new market went under major renovations to keep up with the city's progress of a modern blend. Despite many restorations over time, the market remains one of the earliest and most iconic surviving structures of Saigon.

== Market activities ==
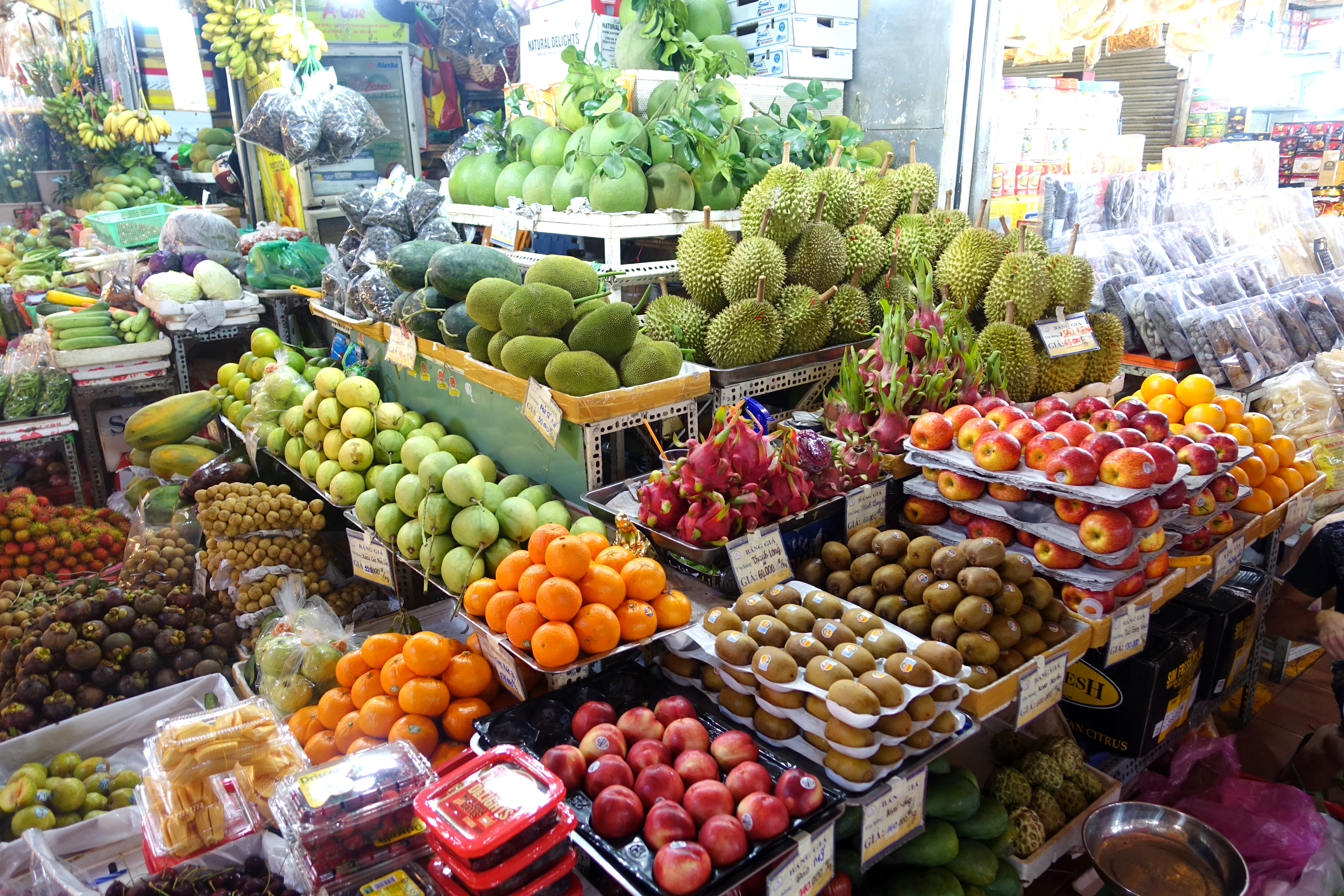
Fruit stand inside the market.

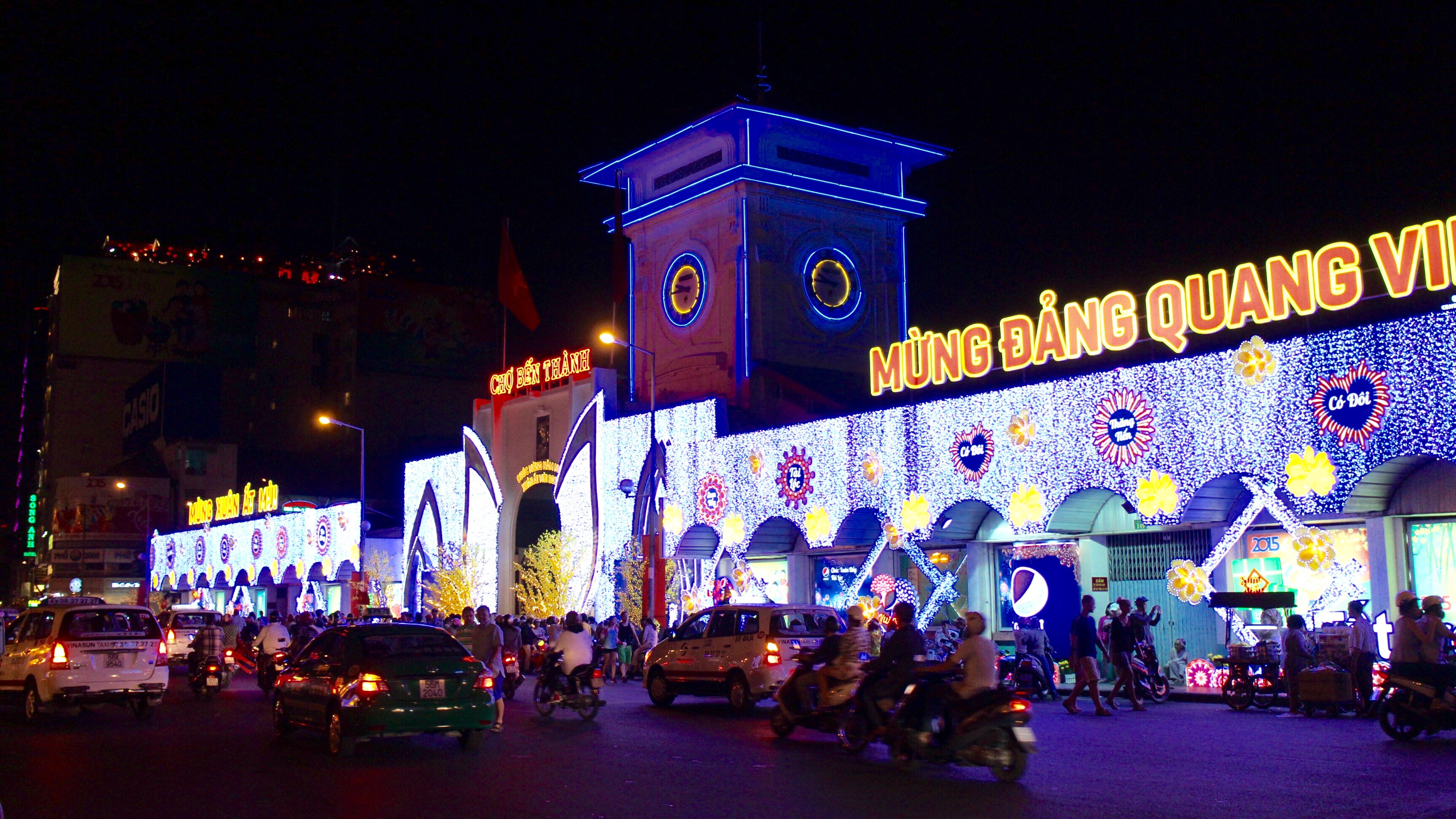
Bến Thành Market at night.

=== Day market ===
Four main market gateways also serve as a directory for its customers. Each gate has a designated area to sell specialty items. For example, the southern gate is divided among garments, textiles, and clothing along with shoes, jewelry, and cosmetic products. The Northern gate is where people can find a variety of fresh fruits, fish and poultry. This is also where the food vendors are set up to sell common Vietnamese dishes like pho, broken rice, bun bo hue, bun thit nuong, banh beo, grilled seafood and desserts. The Eastside also offers edible goods that are packaged such as dried seafood and poultry, roasted peanuts, candied fruit, coffee beans, tea, fish sauce, herbs, and spices. On the opposite side, the Western gate offers predominantly arts and ceramics.

=== Night market ===
At 6 pm UTC+07.00, vendors set up brightly lit stalls on two sides of the streets Phan Bội Châu and Phan Chu Trinh. The stalls offer similar items to the day market but with a greater emphasis on food. Some street stalls expand into sit down restaurants offering tables and seats. Many locals gather to the area after work and it's also suitable for tourist as they offer western-style menus in English.

== Transportation ==
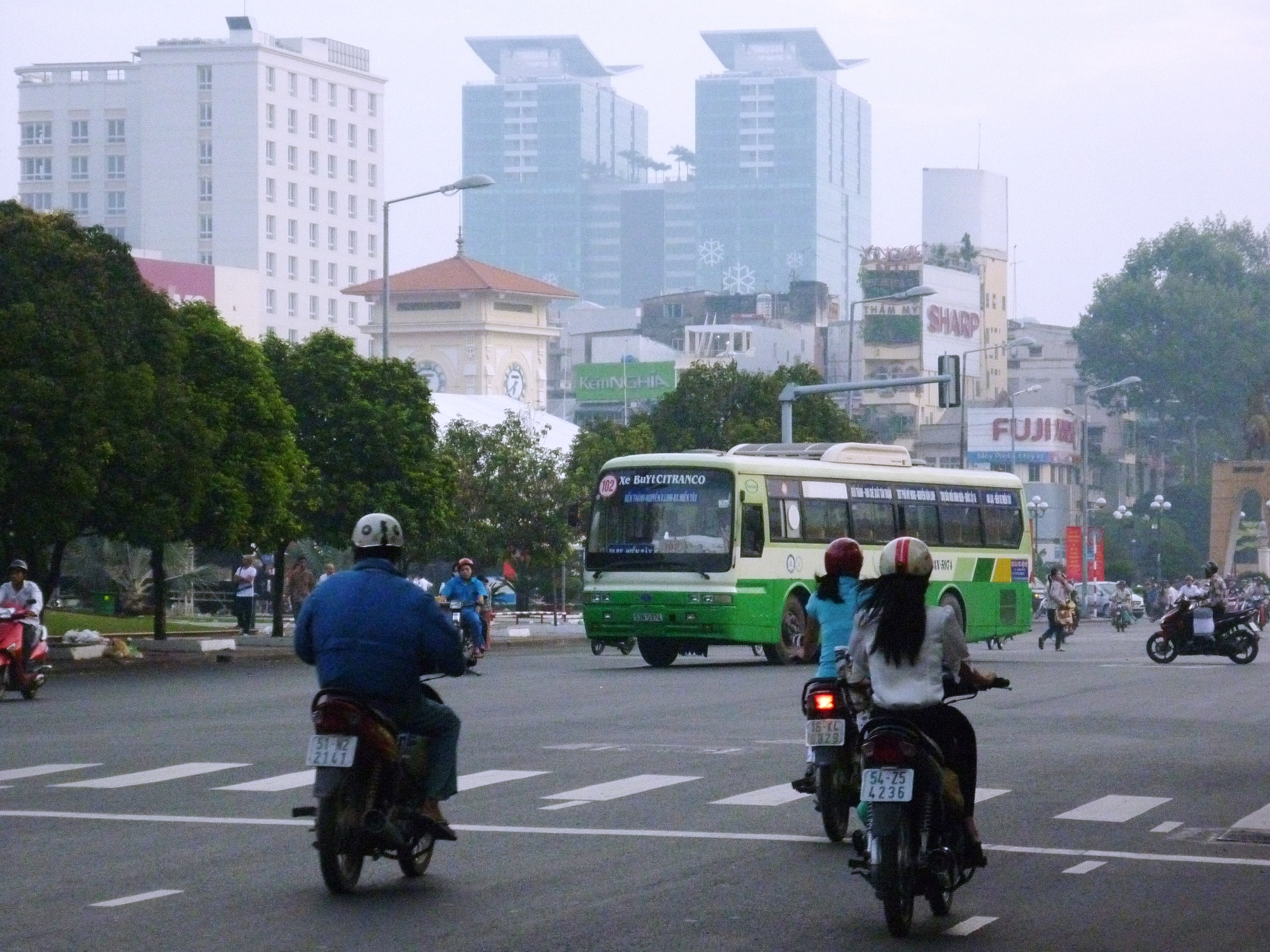
Bến Thành Market is located on a busy intersection where metro train, buses and motorbikes passing simultaneously.

Apart from being a major hub for the network of city buses, the market is adjacent to the Ben Thanh station of the Ho Chi Minh City Metro, with Line 1 opening on 22 December 2024. The station is a hub for other metro several lines, including Lines 2 and 4, which are planned and under construction. Line 1, the completed stretch, connects the market with Vietnam National University, Ho Chi Minh City, Suối Tiên Park and Eastern Bus Terminus in District 9 (now is Thủ Đức). Other lines are the western extension of Line 1, which is planned, is connect with Cholon and Bình Tân District; Line 2 with Bến Thành with Tân Bình and Tham Lương in District 12, Line 4 with District 12, Gò Vấp, Phú Nhuận and Phú Mỹ Hưng urban area, Nhà Bè district, and Line 12 connects the market with Cần Giờ area.

Tan Son Nhat International Airport is the closest airport in the Ho Chi Minh City metropolitan area, located within the city limits and only 7 kilometers from the northwest of the market. From the airport, the market can be easily accessed by taxis (Vinasun/Mai Linh), Grab, motorbike, bike, or bus. Directly across from Ben Thanh Market was the Saigon bus station; however, it was moved a bit to the east on Hàm Nghi Boulevard and the station now is the under constructed One Central Saigon. The other airport in the metropolitan area is Long Thanh International Airport that approximately 40 km away from the eastern of the market, it can be access by all means of transport above in about half an hour to an hour under favorable traffic conditions.

== In popular media ==
Bến Thành Market along with Quách Thị Trang Square Roundabout were appeared in the music video of "Stronger (What Doesn't Kill You)" by Kelly Clarkson as one of the flash mob videos alternate throughout the video. The video was taken by Youth to Change (YTC), a youth network of the non-profit organization ActionAid International Vietnam, at the September 23rd Park, towards Lê Lợi Boulevard, it was an idea of a member from the forum after Clarkson announced on her website that she wanted to incorporate a global flash mob into the accompanying music video to express more "the spirit of the song and the country".
