= New Eastern Bus Terminus =

Bus station in Ho Chi Minh City, Vietnam

New Eastern Bus Terminus Bến xe Miền Đông mới

General information
- Location: 501 Hoàng Hữu Nam Street, Long Bình, Ho Chi Minh City
- Coordinates: 10.8801372°N 106.8157117°E
- System: Buses
- Operator: Sai Gon Mechanical Engineering Corporation
- Connections: 1 Suoi Tien Terminal station
Location

New Eastern Bus Terminus (Vietnamese: Bến xe Miền Đông mới) is the largest bus station in Vietnam, located in Long Bình ward, Hồ Chí Minh City. The station opened in April 2020, and is aimed at reducing congestion at the Eastern Bus Station in Bình Thạnh District.

During the first three months, the old station would remain open and the new station was only used by long distance routes of over 1,100 km.

In March 2021, VnExpress reported that in one week, just 360 passengers used the station. On an average day, only 20 buses departed from the station. The 17 km distance from the old bus station near the city center, combined with lacking connections to the station, led passengers to avoid the new station. The adjacent metro station was opened in Decenmber 2024, in front of the gate of the terminus, connects it with the city centre and later will be extended to connect with the adjacent satellite cities in provinces like Bình Dương and Đồng Nai.
