= Eastern Bus Terminus =

Bus station in Ho Chi Minh City, Vietnam

Mien Dong Bus Station Nhà ga bến xe miền Đông
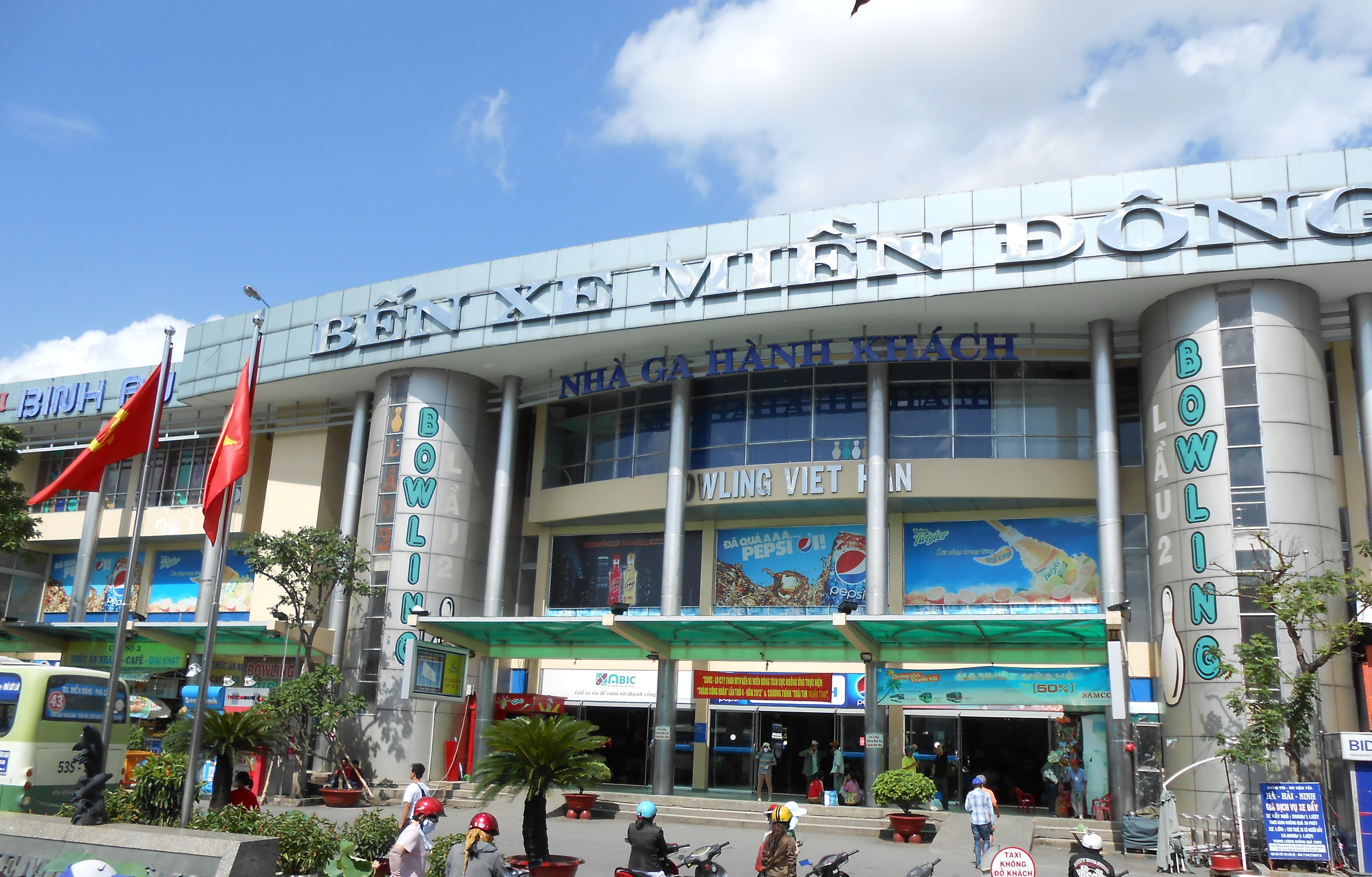

General information
- Location: 292, Đinh Bộ Lĩnh, Bình Thạnh, Ho Chi Minh City
- Coordinates: 10.81491°N 106.71129°E
- System: Buses; Ho Chi Minh City Metro
Location

Eastern Bus Terminus or Eastern Bus Station, (Vietnamese: Bến xe Miền Đông), is a bus station in Bình Thạnh, Ho Chi Minh City, Vietnam. This station is the terminus of buses to and from North and Central Vietnam, as well as the provinces in the east side of the city.

Nowadays, the terminus is planned to become a project for urban. All the bus routes are gradually moving to the New Eastern Bus Terminus in Thủ Đức, the terminus is 40-minute drive to the south-east from the old one, it is connected by Suoi Tien Terminal station for people from the urban core access to the terminus and backward.
