= Da Nang C Hospital =

Hospital in Vietnam

Geography
- Location: 122 Hai Phong Street, Da Nang, Vietnam
- Coordinates: 16.073409°N 108.216292°E

Links
- Website: bvcdn.org.vn
- Lists: Hospitals in Vietnam

Đà Nẵng C Hospital is the second-largest public hospital in the Vietnamese city of Đà Nẵng, after Đà Nẵng Hospital. It is located at 122 Hai Phong Street.
