= Da Nang Hospital =

Hospital in Vietnam

Geography
- Location: 124 Hải Phòng, Thạch Thang, Thành Phố, Da Nang, Vietnam
- Coordinates: 16.072717°N 108.215678°E

Links
- Website: dananghospital.org.vn
- Lists: Hospitals in Vietnam

Đà Nẵng Hospital (Vietnamese: Bệnh viện Đà Nẵng) is the largest hospital in the city of Đà Nẵng, Vietnam. It was established before 1945 as the Hôpital de Danang.
